= Óscar Herrera =

Óscar or Oscar Herrera may refer to:

- Oscar Herrera Ahuad (born 1971), Argentine politician
- Óscar Herrera Hernández (1959–2015), Chilean footballer
- Oscar Herrera Hosking (born 1943), Mexican politician, municipal president of Monterrey in 1983–1986
- Oscar Herrera, Jr. (born 1954), Filipino jurist
- Óscar Herrera Palacios (1907–1985), Chilean politician
