= Sarah Jane Fernandez =

Filipino jurist

The Honorable Sarah Jane T. Fernandez

Associate Justice of the Sandiganbayan
- Incumbent
- Assumed office May 5, 2015
- Appointed by: Benigno Aquino III
- Preceded by: Gregory Ong

Personal details
- Born: May 14, 1969 (age 57) Philippines
- Education: Ateneo School of Law; Asian Institute of Management (MBA)
- Occupation: Judge
- Profession: Lawyer

Sarah Jane T. Fernandez (born May 14, 1969) is a Filipino lawyer, academic, and jurist who currently serves as an Associate Justice of the Sandiganbayan, the Philippines’ anti-graft court. She was appointed to the post in May 5, 2015 by President Benigno Aquino III, succeeding Associate Justice Gregory Ong, who was dismissed from office by the Supreme Court in 2014.

== Career ==
Before her appointment to the Sandiganbayan, Fernandez spent more than two decades at the Office of the Solicitor General (OSG). She began her career as a Trial Attorney I and rose through the ranks, eventually being appointed as Assistant Solicitor General in 2006.

At the OSG, she handled high-profile cases involving the alleged ill-gotten wealth of former President Ferdinand Marcos and his cronies. Fernandez was also part of the Philippine legal team in the arbitration case filed against China before the Permanent Court of Arbitration concerning territorial disputes in the West Philippine Sea.

== Appointment to the Sandiganbayan ==
On May 9, 2015, Malacañang announced the appointment of Fernandez as Associate Justice of the Sandiganbayan to replace Justice Gregory Ong. She was assigned as the junior member of the court’s Third Division chaired by then Presiding Justice Amparo Cabotaje-Tang.

Her first assignment as justice was to sit as a substitute in the Fifth Division’s hearing on Jinggoy Estrada’s petition to post bail for plunder, as Justice Alexander Gesmundo was on leave.

The Third Division, where Fernandez was later formally assigned, also handled the plunder case against businesswoman Janet Lim-Napoles in connection with the multibillion-peso pork barrel scam.

== Education and academic career ==
Fernandez is a graduate of the Ateneo School of Law. She later obtained a Master’s Degree in Business Administration from the Asian Institute of Management.

In addition to her government service, Fernandez has taught Taxation Law at the University of Santo Tomas Faculty of Civil Law.
