= Mañalac =

Mañalac is a surname. Notable people with the surname include:

- Bamboo Mañalac (born 1976), Filipino musician, singer and songwriter
- Maryann Corpus-Mañalac (born 1966), Filipino associate justice of the Sandiganbayan
