= Kevin Narce Vivero =

Filipino lawyer

Kevin Narce B. Vivero

68th Associate Justice of the Sandiganbayan
- Incumbent
- Assumed office November 28, 2017
- Appointed by: Rodrigo Duterte
- Preceded by: Samuel Martires

Personal details
- Born: January 2, 1960 (age 65) Philippines
- Occupation: Judge

Kevin Narce B. Vivero (born January 2, 1960) is a Filipino lawyer and jurist who currently serves as the 68th Associate Justice of the Sandiganbayan. He was appointed by President Rodrigo Duterte on November 28, 2017, filling the vacancy left by Associate Justice Samuel Martires, who was appointed to the Supreme Court of the Philippines in March 2017.

== Career ==
Prior to his appointment to the Sandiganbayan, Vivero served as presiding judge of the Antipolo City Regional Trial Court. He was among several judicial officials promoted by Duterte in 2017, which included judges, prosecutors, and executive officials.
