= Efren de la Cruz =

Efren de la Cruz may refer to:

- Efren de la Cruz (footballer)
- Efren de la Cruz (jurist)
