= Edilberto Sandoval =

Filipino jurist

Honorable Edilberto Sandoval
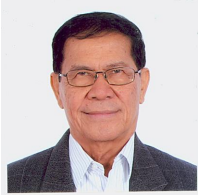

Special Prosecutor, Office of the Ombudsman
- Acting
- In office 28 June 2017 – 27 June 2024
- Preceded by: Wendell Barreras-Sulit
- Succeeded by: Mariflor Punzalan-Castillo

Presiding Justice of the Sandiganbayan
- In office 17 September 2010 – 4 October 2011
- Appointed by: Gloria Macapagal-Arroyo
- Preceded by: Norberto Geraldez
- Succeeded by: Francisco Villaruz Jr.

Associate Justice of the Sandiganbayan
- In office 11 March 1996 – 17 September 2010
- Appointed by: Fidel V. Ramos
- Preceded by: Regino C. Hermosisima Jr.
- Succeeded by: Oscar Herrera Jr.

Personal details
- Born: Edilberto Gloria Sandoval; June 20, 1941 (age 85)
- Spouse: Pelagia C. Sandoval
- Children: Shy Marie C. Sandoval; Rex Reynaldo C. Sandoval; Maria Teresita Sandoval
- Education: Far Eastern University (A.A., LL.B.); postgraduate training, Harvard University
- Occupation: Judge, Special Prosecutor, Professor

Edilberto Gloria Sandoval (born June 20, 1941) is a Filipino jurist, academic and public prosecutor. He is a retired presiding justice and former Chairman of the Second Division of the Sandiganbayan. After retiring from the bench, Sandoval returned to government service as Special Prosecutor of the Office of the Ombudsman in 2017 until his retirement on June 27, 2024

== Early life and education ==
Sandoval obtained an Associate in Arts degree (with High Honors) and a Bachelor of Laws (Cum Laude, Valedictorian) from Far Eastern University. He undertook special postgraduate training at Harvard University in Boston, United States, in June 2006.

== Judicial career ==
Sandoval began his career in the judiciary in 1983 when he was appointed by President Ferdinand Marcos as Judge of the Regional Trial Court (RTC) of Oriental Mindoro (Branch 42). He was later appointed by President Corazon Aquino as Judge of the RTC of Manila (Branch 9). He subsequently became an Associate Justice of the Sandiganbayan after appointment by President Fidel V. Ramos.

During his ten-year tenure as an RTC judge in Manila, Sandoval was named Most Outstanding Regional Trial Court Judge of Manila for three consecutive years (1991–1994). He was appointed Associate Justice of the Sandiganbayan on 11 March 1996. Sandoval later served as Presiding Justice of the Sandiganbayan, a position to which he was appointed by President Benigno Aquino III in September 2010. He was at one point nominated by the Judicial and Bar Council for the position of Chief Justice of the Supreme Court of the Philippines, being notable as the only nominee who was not then serving on the Supreme Court bench.

== Academic career ==
Sandoval is a well-known professor and bar reviewer in criminal law. He has taught at several Philippine universities, including the University of Santo Tomas, Ateneo de Manila, Far Eastern University, University of the East, Arellano University, Jose Rizal University, Philippine Christian University, and De La Salle University. Since 2000 he has been a member of the Corps of Professors and Head of the Criminal Law Department of the Philippine Judicial Academy. The Supreme Court appointed him as a Bar Examiner three times: Criminal Law (1993), Legal and Judicial Ethics (1998), and again in Criminal Law (2009).

== Special Prosecutor and later career ==
After retiring from the Sandiganbayan, Sandoval returned to public service when President Rodrigo Roa Duterte appointed him Special Prosecutor of the Office of the Ombudsman on 28 June 2017. The Special Prosecutor leads the Office of the Special Prosecutor, the prosecutorial arm of the Office of the Ombudsman, and is tasked with prosecuting cases pending before the Sandiganbayan involving high government officials.

While serving as Special Prosecutor, Sandoval was involved in high-profile matters, including moves to contest bail grants in several corruption-related cases and opposing witness protection for principal figures in the alleged pork-barrel scandal.

In May 2018 Sandoval publicly confirmed that he had applied for the post of Ombudsman, which was due to become vacant upon the retirement of Ombudsman Conchita Carpio Morales.

== Publications ==
- Pointers in Criminal Law and Revised Penal Code (Book II) — author.

== Personal life ==
Sandoval is married to Pelagia C. Sandoval, a retired public school principal. They have three children.

== See also ==
- Sandiganbayan
- Ombudsman of the Philippines

== Sources ==
This article incorporates text from a free content work. Licensed under public domain as a work of the Philippine government. Text taken from Edilberto G. Sandoval biography, Government of the Philippines. Office of the Ombudsman.
