= Lord Villanueva =

Filipino associate justice of the Sandiganbayan

Honorable Lord Apalisok Villanueva
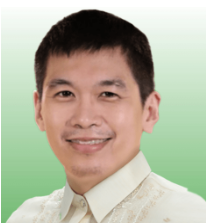

76th Associate Justice of the Sandiganbayan
- Incumbent
- Assumed office January 30, 2025
- Appointed by: Bongbong Marcos
- Preceded by: Rafael Lagos

Undersecretary for Operations, Department of the Interior and Local Government

Assistant City Administrator for General Affairs, Quezon City

Personal details
- Born: Lord Apalisok Villanueva; June 9, 1975 (age 51)
- Education: University of the Philippines College of Law
- Occupation: Lawyer, Jurist
- Profession: Attorney

Lord Apalisok Villanueva (born June 9, 1975) is a Filipino lawyer, government official, and jurist who currently serves as the 76th Associate Justice of the Sandiganbayan. He was appointed to the court on January 30, 2025, replacing Justice Rafael Lagos.

== Career ==
=== Private practice ===
Before entering government service, Villanueva spent 16 years in private law practice. He served as Special Counsel in Flaminiano Arroyo & Dueñas, where he handled shareholder litigation and due diligence for infrastructure and mining projects. He was also Senior Counsel at Villamor Law Firm, representing multinational corporations in infrastructure development. Earlier, he was an associate lawyer at Quisumbing Torres / Baker & McKenzie, where he advised investors and acted as corporate secretary for several multinational companies.

=== Government service ===
Villanueva was appointed Assistant City Administrator for General Affairs of Quezon City, where he advised the Mayor on city management, governance, executive policies, and coordination with the City Council.

In 2022, he was appointed Undersecretary for Operations at the Department of the Interior and Local Government (DILG). In this role, he assisted the Secretary in overseeing administrative and financial policies, systems, and procedures of the Department.

On January 30, 2025, he was appointed Associate Justice of the Sandiganbayan, succeeding Justice Rafael Lagos.

== Education ==
Villanueva earned his Bachelor of Laws degree from the University of the Philippines College of Law, where he was awarded the Dean's Medal for Academic Excellence and became a member of the Order of the Purple Feather Honor Society.

In 2001, he was part of the UP Law team in the Philip C. Jessup International Law Moot Court Competition, which won the national championship and reached the quarterfinals in Washington, D.C.

He was admitted to the Philippine Bar in 2003.

Legal offices
Preceded by Rafael Lagos	Associate Justice of the Supreme Court of the Sandiganbayan; 2025–present	Succeeded by Incumbent
