= Samuel Martires =

Ombudsman of the Philippines (born 1949)

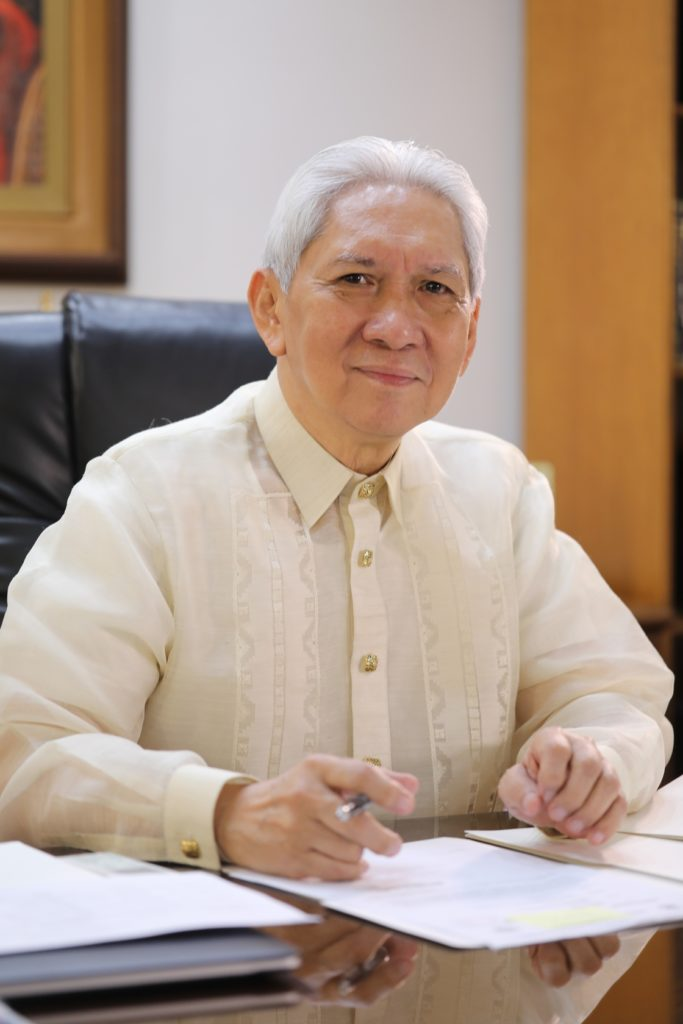

6th Ombudsman of the Philippines
- In office August 6, 2018 – July 27, 2025
- President: Rodrigo Duterte; Bongbong Marcos
- Preceded by: Conchita Carpio-Morales
- Succeeded by: Jesus Crispin Remulla

175th Associate Justice of the Supreme Court of the Philippines
- In office March 6, 2017 – July 31, 2018
- Appointed by: Rodrigo Duterte
- Preceded by: Jose Perez
- Succeeded by: Ramon Paul Hernando

Associate Justice of the Sandiganbayan
- In office October 15, 2005 – March 6, 2017
- Appointed by: Gloria Macapagal Arroyo
- Preceded by: Raoul Victorino
- Succeeded by: Kevin Nrce Vivero

Personal details
- Born: January 2, 1949 (age 77) Palapag, Samar, Philippines
- Spouse: Cecilia S. Martires
- Education: Manuel L. Quezon University (AB); San Beda College (LLB)

Samuel Reyes Martires (Tagalog: [sɐmˈwɛl ˈrɛjɛs ˌmaːɾtɪˈrɛs]; born January 2, 1949) is a Filipino lawyer who previously served as the Ombudsman of the Philippines from 2018 until 2025. He was appointed to the post by then-President Rodrigo Duterte. He was an Associate Justice of the Supreme Court from 2017 to 2018.

Martires has repeatedly called for less transparency in government throughout his tenure as Ombudsman, directly taking steps to conceal information on government officials' wealth from the public and calling for the imprisonment of people who make "commentaries" on officials' wealth, earning him criticism as a protector of corrupt politicians.

== Early life ==
Samuel Reyes Martires was born on January 2, 1949, in Palapag, Samar (now in Northern Samar). His father died when he was five years old. When he was in high school, he wanted to become a priest; he sought permission from his mother to become a missionary but was denied. Some of his relatives were Catholic priests: two of his father's cousins were Benedictines while Cardinal Julio Rosales, the Archbishop of Cebu, was a relative of his grandfather. According to Martires, he continued to dream of priesthood until he met his would-be wife Cecilia.

Martires attended Manuel L. Quezon University in Quezon City and graduated with a Bachelor of Arts in 1971. He then earned his Bachelor of Laws from San Beda College in 1975 and passed the bar exam the following year, becoming the first lawyer in his family.

== Judicial career ==
After qualifying as a lawyer, he worked as a legal officer for the Department of Public Works, Transportation and Communication until 1979. He then became an assistant department manager at the Ministry of Human Settlements until 1984. Martires was also involved in some small business ventures. After the 1986 People Power Revolution, he received an offer to become a judge, which he declined, citing the low salary and their ill reputation of being corrupt. His mother, however, wanted him to join the judiciary. Beginning in 1987, he went into private practice as a litigator handling mostly civil cases.

Martires enrolled in the Master of Laws program of the University of Santo Tomas but only earned 27 units.

=== Regional Trial Court ===
In June 1998, a month after his mother's death, he submitted his application to become a trial court judge. In July 2000, he became the presiding judge of the Regional Trial Court, Branch 32 of Agoo, La Union.

In 2002, Judge Caroline Pangan of the Rosario, La Union Municipal Trial Court filed an administrative complaint to the Supreme Court against Martires and fellow Agoo RTC judge Clifton U. Ganay. She accused the two judges of "gross ignorance of the law, incompetence, abuse of authority and dereliction of duty". Martires allegedly refused to issue a warrant of arrest for a murder suspect despite the presence of evidence and the urgings of the prosecution. The complaint was dismissed for lack of merit.

=== Supreme Court of the Philippines ===
President Rodrigo Duterte appointed him as associate justice of the Supreme Court of the Philippines on March 2, 2017. Prior to his appointment, he had served as associate justice of the Sandiganbayan from 2005 to 2017.

On May 11, 2018, Martires was one of the eight justices who voted in favor of the quo warranto petition filed by Solicitor General Jose Calida against then-Chief Justice Maria Lourdes Sereno.

In his Supreme Court decision acquitting two men of rape in 2018 (concurred by Associate Justices Presbitero Velasco Jr., Lucas Bersamin, Marvic Leonen, and Alexander Gesmundo), Martires rejected the application of the decades-long María Clara doctrine in trial courts' decision of rape cases, saying that it "borders on the fallacy of non-sequitur" and that doing so would put the accused "at an unfair disadvantage" and bring forth a "travesty of justice". Martires argued that the doctrine has become obsolete, as women over the years have become less reluctant to disclose sexual abuse committed against them.

=== Ombudsman of the Philippines ===
On July 26, 2018, he was appointed as the 6th Ombudsman by President Rodrigo Duterte, replacing then-outgoing Ombudsman Conchita Carpio-Morales. The Supreme Court then approved his early retirement. He was then sworn into office on August 6. In June 2019, he fired Overall Deputy Ombudsman Melchor Carandang, who was investigating President Rodrigo Duterte's alleged bank accounts in 2017.

In July 2019, media outlets reported that Martires' Statement of Assets, Liabilities and Net Worth (SALN) reflected an increase of ₱15 million within the first five months of his tenure as ombudsman. In the same month, Martires granted Senator Joel Villanueva's motion for reconsideration under a previous Ombudsman 2016 decision by his predecessor Conchita Carpio Morales which ordered Villanueva be removed from office over Villanueva's alleged misuse of ₱10 million of his Priority Development Assistance Fund allocation in 2008 and perpetually disqualified the lawmaker from office. This decision only became known to the wider public in October 2025.

In September 2020, Martires issued a memorandum circular regarding the releasing of copies of the SALN of public officials. The said guidelines were criticized for adding more restrictions on who can acquire copies of the documents. Under the new guidelines, the people who can request copies of SALNs are the public officials who filed them or their representatives, a court as part of a case, and the Ombudsman's field investigators. The public, especially the media, were now required to present a notarized letter from the public official whose SALN they intend to see. The memorandum cited "The Code of Conduct for Public Officials" (Republic Act No. 6713), however, the aforementioned law allows journalists to obtain copies of officials' SALNs and report on them. The new ruling made it more difficult to investigate public officials' possible stolen wealth, such as Philippine senators implicated in the Panama Papers and Pandora Papers scandals.

He announced that his office will stop conducting lifestyle checks on public officials, reasoning that having a luxurious lifestyle does not prove that an official is corrupt. He also criticized lifestyle checks as "illogical" and "purely" based on estimates. He also claimed that the SALNs and lifestyle checks are used by the media and political rivals to "extort" government officials.

In 2021, Martires proposed a bill to imprison or fine anyone reporting on a government official's statement of wealth. Congress Representative Carlos Zarate, lawyers, and journalists criticized the proposal, saying that it violates the Constitution and limits the freedom of the press and the public's right to hold public officials accountable for acts of corruption.

Martires has suggested that the Office of the Ombudsman should be abolished, citing that the lack of witnesses and their refusal to testify or file affidavits make investigations more difficult and thus render the office unnecessary. His predecessor Conchita Carpio-Morales criticized his proposal, arguing that it will "open floodgates to the commission of more corrupt activities." Also, under Martires Office of the Ombudsman's rate of conviction in its court cases declined from 61.2 percent in 2020 to 26.5 percent in 2022.

Martires's performance in pursuing corruption cases during Duterte's presidency was frequently alleged to have been dismal. He officially retired in the position on July 27, 2025.

During the 2026 House of Representatives justice committee impeachment hearing against Vice President Sara Duterte, self-confessed "bagman" Ramil Madriaga said that he personally collected ₱175 million from the head of Pharmally and delivered part of it to the Office of the Ombudsman, then headed by Martires.

Legal offices
Preceded by Raoul Victorino	Associate Justice of the Sandiganbayan; 2005–2017	Succeeded by Kevin Narce Vivero
Preceded by Jose P. Perez	Associate Justice of the Supreme Court of the Philippines; 2017–2018	Succeeded by Ramon Paul Hernando
Government offices
Preceded by Conchita Carpio-Morales	Ombudsman of the Philippines; 2018–2025	Succeeded by Jesus Crispin C. Remulla
