= Maria Theresa Mendoza-Arcega =

Filipino lawyer and judge

The Honorable Maria Theresa V. Mendoza-Arcega
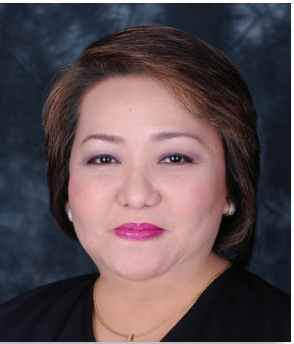

61st Associate Justice of the Sandiganbayan
- Incumbent
- Assumed office January 20, 2016
- Appointed by: Benigno Aquino III
- Preceded by: Seat Created

Personal details
- Born: December 18, 1965 (age 60) Philippines
- Spouse(s): Danilo G. Arcega, Jr.
- Children: Gaston Diego, Luis Alfonso, Ana Sophia
- Education: San Beda College of Law
- Occupation: Judge
- Profession: CPA and Lawyer

Maria Theresa V. Mendoza-Arcega (born December 18, 1965) is a Filipino lawyer, judge, and Certified Public Accountant who currently serves as the 61st Associate Justice of the Sandiganbayan. She was appointed to the post by President Benigno Aquino III on January 20, 2016.

== Career ==
Mendoza-Arcega began her legal career in 1990 as a Court Researcher at the Supreme Court. In 1991, she transferred to the Regional Trial Court (RTC) of Bulacan as a Branch Clerk of Court. After six years, she was appointed as the Municipal Trial Court Judge of Bustos, Bulacan.

She later became the Presiding Judge of Branch 17 of the RTC in Malolos, Bulacan, a designated Family Court, and also served as the Executive Judge of the RTC of Malolos. During this time, she became a member of the Supreme Court’s Committee on Family Courts and Juvenile Concerns.

=== Sandiganbayan ===
In January 2016, Mendoza-Arcega was appointed as the 61st Associate Justice of the Sandiganbayan. At the anti-graft court, she chairs the Committee on Gender Responsiveness. She also serves as a member of the Supreme Court’s Committee on Gender Responsiveness in the Judiciary.

== Academic career ==
Mendoza-Arcega is a Professor of Law at her alma mater, San Beda University, Manila, where she teaches Legal Ethics and other law subjects. She has also taught in other law schools.

She served as a Bar Examiner in Legal Ethics and Practical Exercises during the 2015 and 2019 Philippine Bar Examinations.

== Awards and recognition ==
Mendoza-Arcega has received several awards, including:

- Award for Judicial Excellence (2002)
- IBP-Bulacan’s Gawad Bunying Abogadong Bulakenyo
- Ulirang Ina Award (2015)
- Distinguished Woman of Service Award, San Beda Colleger
