= Maria Theresa Dolores Gomez-Estoesta =

Filipino judge

The Honorable Ma. Theresa Dolores Gomez-Estoesta
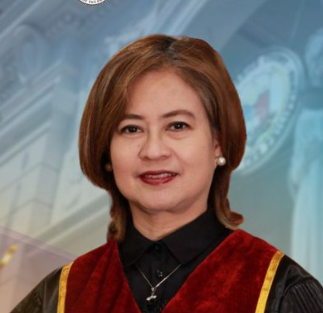

16th Court Administrator of the Supreme Court of the Philippines
- Incumbent
- Assumed office September 1, 2025
- Preceded by: Raul Villanueva

56th Associate Justice of the Sandiganbayan
- In office June 20, 2014 – September 1, 2025
- Appointed by: Benigno Aquino III
- Preceded by: Amparo Cabotaje-Tang

Personal details
- Born: March 17, 1967
- Education: De La Salle University (AB Political Science); Ateneo de Manila University (LLB)
- Awards: Chief Justice Cayetano Arellano Award (2012); Outstanding Judge for First-Level Courts (2005)

Ma. Theresa Dolores Gomez-Estoesta (born March 17, 1967) is a Filipino lawyer who currently serves as Court Administrator of the Office of the Court Administrator since September 1, 2025. She previously served as an Associate Justice of the Sandiganbayan from 2014 until her appointment on September 1, 2025. She was appointed by President Benigno Aquino III on June 20, 2014, succeeding Amparo Cabotaje-Tang, who had been named Presiding Justice of the anti-graft court.

== Education ==
Estoesta earned her bachelor's degree in political science from De La Salle University graduated cum laude. She then received her Bachelor of Laws from Ateneo de Manila University in 1991

== Judicial career ==
Before her appointment to the Sandiganbayan, Estoesta served as Presiding Judge of the Manila Regional Trial Court from 2006. She earlier presided over the Manila Metropolitan Trial Court and worked at the Office of the Solicitor General from 1991 to 2002.

In 2005, Estoesta was recognized as the most outstanding judge for first-level courts in the Supreme Court’s Search for Judicial Excellence, and in 2012, she received the Chief Justice Cayetano Arellano Award for being the most outstanding judge for second-level courts.

=== Judicial and Bar Council controversy ===
Her appointment came after a dispute between the Judicial and Bar Council (JBC) and Malacañang over the shortlist of nominees for the vacant Sandiganbayan post. The Palace had asked the JBC to review the affiliations of some nominees, including one linked to Senator Juan Ponce Enrile, who was facing plunder and graft charges before the court. The JBC refused, citing constitutional limits on its authority.

Other nominees on the shortlist were Makati RTC Judge Maryann Corpus-Manalac, Quezon City RTC Judge Bernelito Fernandez, Antipolo RTC Judge Ronaldo Martin, Makati RTC Judge Andres Soriano, DOJ Chief State Counsel Ricardo Paras III, DOJ Undersecretary Leah Armamento, and Assistant Solicitor General Marissa Macaraig Guillen.

=== Dissenting opinion in the Revilla Plunder Case ===
In December 2018, Ma. Theresa Dolores Gomez-Estoesta, sitting as a special member of the Sandiganbayan First Division, issued a dissenting opinion in the plunder trial of former senator Ramon “Bong” Revilla Jr. The court, voting 3–2, acquitted Revilla while convicting his co-accused, Richard Cambe and Janet Lim-Napoles.

Estoesta, along with division chair Efren de la Cruz, disagreed with the majority ruling, asserting that excessive weight had been given to Revilla's defense of forgery and to the recantation of key whistle-blowers. She argued that these recantations were improperly prioritized over other evidence presented by the prosecution that, in her view, linked Revilla to the misuse of his Priority Development Assistance Fund.

She further noted that the special five-member division formed under the Sandiganbayan's internal rules due to the lack of unanimity had overlooked the broader evidentiary context, thereby undermining the case against Revilla.

== Awards and recognition ==
In March 2024, Justice Ma. Teresa Dolores Gomez-Estoesta, who chairs the Seventh Division of the Sandiganbayan, was honored with the Gawad Felisa Jocson Award from Jocson College in Angeles City for her exemplary contributions to the judiciary and government service.
