= Edgardo Caldona =

Filipino associate justice of the Sandiganbayan

Edgardo M. Caldona
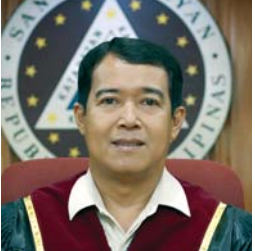

66th Associate Justice of the Sandiganbayan
- Incumbent
- Assumed office March 10, 2017
- Preceded by: Jose Hernandez

Personal details
- Born: February 12, 1970 (age 56) Philippines
- Education: Ateneo de Manila University
- Occupation: Judge

Edgardo M. Caldona (born February 12, 1970) is a Filipino lawyer and jurist who currently serves as the 66th Associate Justice of the Sandiganbayan. He was appointed to the position on March 10, 2017, by President Rodrigo Duterte, replacing Associate Justice Jose Hernandez who retired on November 16, 2016.

== Early life and education ==
Justice Ed obtained his bachelor's degree in Political Science from the Ateneo de Manila University in 1991. He was admitted to the Juris Doctor program of the Ateneo Law School, where he graduated on the dean’s list in 1995. After passing the Philippine Bar Examinations in 1996, he pursued graduate studies and earned his Master of Laws (LL.M.) degree from the University of Santo Tomas.

== Career ==
He previously worked as legal staff for the late Chief Justice Renato Corona and served as court attorney at the Supreme Court of the Philippines. He also worked at the Sandiganbayan under Justice Sabino de Leon.

Before his appointment to the anti-graft court, Caldona served as presiding judge of Makati Regional Trial Court Branch 65, where he handled several drug-related cases. He had earlier served as a judge in Pangasinan.
