= Fritz Bryn Anthony Delos Santos =

Filipino jurist

Fritz Bryn Anthony delos Santos

76th Associate Justice of the Sandiganbayan
- Incumbent
- Assumed office September 23, 2025
- Appointed by: Bongbong Marcos
- Preceded by: Geraldine Faith Econg

Personal details
- Born: Fritz Bryn Anthony Makasiar delos Santos; May 13, 1985 (age 41)
- Education: University of San Carlos (JD) Cornell University (LL.M.)
- Profession: Jurist, Lawyer

Fritz Bryn Anthony Makasiar delos Santos (born May 13, 1985) is a Filipino jurist who serves as an Associate Justice of the Sandiganbayan. He was appointed in 2025 by President Bongbong Marcos. On July 31, 2026, Delos Santos voted to grant the bail petition of former senator Bong Revilla during his flood control malversation case, with Delos Santos penning the controversial decision approving Revilla's bail at ₱1 million.

== Early life and education ==
Delos Santos earned his Juris Doctor degree from the University of San Carlos in Cebu City. He later pursued advanced legal studies at Cornell University, where he obtained a Master of Laws (LL.M.) degree. He was admitted to the Philippine Bar in 2012.

== Legal career ==
Career progression
| Year | Position | Office |
|---|---|---|
| 2013 | Court Attorney IV | Supreme Court of the Philippines |
| 2014 | Associate Solicitor | Office of the Solicitor General |
| 2015 | Court Attorney V | Court of Appeals |
| 2017 | Court Attorney VI | Supreme Court of the Philippines |
| 2025 | Associate Justice | Sandiganbayan |

Delos Santos built his career across multiple judicial and legal institutions in the Philippines, serving in both appellate and advisory capacities before his appointment to the Sandiganbayan.

== Judicial career ==
In 2025, Delos Santos was appointed Associate Justice of the Sandiganbayan by President Bongbong Marcos. He is expected to serve until the mandatory retirement age of 70, in 2055.

On July 31, 2026, Delos Santos was one of two Sandiganbayan justices in the 3rd Division who voted to grant the bail petition of former senator Bong Revilla during his malversation case involving an anomalous flood control project in Pandi, Bulacan, with Delos Santos penning the court's decision approving Revilla's bail at ₱1 million on the basis that the prosecution's evidence is "not enough to establish that the evidence of guilt against accused Revilla is strong." The decision has been criticized for the perceived unequal granting of bail amongst the seven respondents in the malversation case, with Revilla, a politician, being the sole person granted bail. Delos Santos himself voted against the granting of bail to the six other co-accused of Revilla. Ombudsman Jesus Crispin Remulla later voiced his suspicion that someone "worked" to have the decision be in Revilla's favor, but affirmed that Revilla's case is "only a battle. We have to win the war [against corruption] as a country."

== Personal life ==
Delos Santos is an avid guitarist and musician, reportedly owning a collection of musical instruments and performing with a band alongside his legal career. He was named “Anthony” in honor of St. Anthony de Padua.

== Recognition ==
In 2026, the University of San Carlos honored him during a testimonial dinner recognizing his appointment to the Sandiganbayan and his contributions to the judiciary.
