= Zaldy Trespeses =

Filipino judge

Hon. Zaldy Trespeses
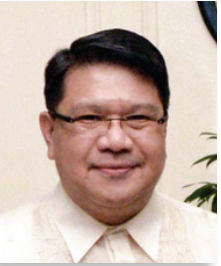

63rd Associate Justice of the Sandiganbayan
- Incumbent
- Assumed office January 20, 2016
- Appointed by: Benigno Aquino III
- Preceded by: Seat Created

Personal details
- Born: December 30, 1972 (age 53) Arevalo, Iloilo City
- Education: University of San Agustin (B.A. Political Science, cum laude); Ateneo de Manila School of Law (LL.B., Second Honors, 1997); St. John’s University – Rome (M.A. in Global Development and Social Justice, 2008)
- Profession: Lawyer, Judge

Zaldy V. Trespeses (December 30, 1972) is a Filipino lawyer and jurist who is currently serving as the 63rd Associate Justice of the Sandiganbayan. He was appointed to the court by President Benigno Aquino III on January 20, 2016.

== Early life and education ==
Zaldy Trespeses was born in Arevalo, Iloilo City.

Trespeses completed his secondary education with the University of San Agustin, where he demonstrated excellence in both academic and non-academic pursuits. He earned his Bachelor of Arts degree in Political Science, graduating cum laude from the University of San Agustin College of Liberal Arts in 1993. During his college years, he served as Editor-in-Chief of the LA Journal, the official student publication of the college.

He pursued legal studies at the Ateneo de Manila School of Law, where he graduated with Second Honors in 1997. That same year, he was admitted to the Integrated Bar of the Philippines. His undergraduate law thesis was titled Preterition of the adopted child: is the claim of preterition conferred by law or by blood?

In 2008, Trespeses obtained a master's degree in Global Development and Social Justice from St. John’s University in Rome, Italy.

== Legal and judicial career ==
Trespeses began his legal career as an associate counsel in a medium-sized law firm, specializing in intellectual property and corporate law. From 2008 to 2010, he became a partner at Laogan & Trespeses Law Offices.

He joined the judiciary in 2010 as Court Attorney VI (law clerk) at the Supreme Court of the Philippines, where he also served as Judiciary Staff Head and later as Chief Justice Staff Head under then-Associate Justice and later Chief Justice Maria Lourdes Sereno. He also acted as her chief protocol officer.

On January 20, 2016, Trespeses was appointed by President Benigno Aquino III as Associate Justice of the Sandiganbayan.

Trespeses has actively participated in conferences and training programs both locally and abroad. In 2017, he was a speaker at the “Judicial Colloquium on the Sharing of Good Practices Regarding International Human Rights” at the ASEAN Intergovernmental Commission on Human Rights in Kuala Lumpur, Malaysia. He also attended an anti-corruption conference organized by the International Center for Parliamentary Studies in London, United Kingdom.
