= Georgina Hidalgo =

Georgina Dumpit-Hidalgo
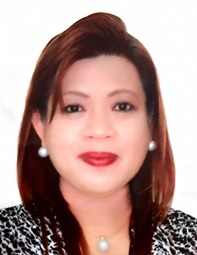

70th Associate Justice of the Sandiganbayan
- Incumbent
- Assumed office January 18, 2018
- Appointed by: Rodrigo Duterte
- Preceded by: Rodolfo Ponferrada

Personal details
- Born: April 14, 1964 (age 62) Philippines
- Education: University of Santo Tomas
- Occupation: Jurist
- Profession: Lawyer, Judge, Justice

Georgina Dumpit-Hidalgo (born April 14, 1964) is a Filipino lawyer and jurist currently serving as the 70th Associate Justice of the Sandiganbayan, the Philippines’ special anti-graft court. She is the first woman elected President of the Philippine Judges Association.

== Early life and education ==
Hidalgo was born on April 14, 1964, in the Philippines. She obtained her Bachelor of Laws degree from the University of Santo Tomas Faculty of Civil Law in 1989 and passed the Bar Examinations the same year, becoming a lawyer at the age of 25.

== Career ==
After passing the bar, Hidalgo joined the Judiciary as Branch Clerk of Court and later became Clerk of Court of the Regional Trial Court of Agoo, La Union. In 1997, she was appointed Assistant Provincial Prosecutor for La Union, becoming the youngest prosecutor in the province.

In 2005, she was appointed Presiding Judge of RTC Branch 68 and Executive Judge of the Regional Trial Court of Lingayen, Pangasinan, making her the youngest RTC Judge in Region I. In 2011, she transferred to the National Capital Region as Presiding Judge of RTC Branch 122, Caloocan City, and concurrently served as Acting Presiding Judge of RTC Branch 144, Makati City.

Hidalgo is also a law professor and bar reviewer at the University of Santo Tomas Faculty of Civil Law, Powerhouse Review Center, and Villasis Review Center. She is a member of the Corps of Professors of the Philippine Judicial Academy and Vice Chairperson of its Criminal Law Department. She participated in international programs, including the Raoul Wallenberg Institute in Bangkok, Thailand, and visited US courts to study speedy and continuous trial techniques.

== Sandiganbayan ==
In June 2018, she was appointed Associate Justice of the Sandiganbayan by President Rodrigo Duterte, replacing retired Justice Rodolfo Ponferrada.

== Awards and recognition ==
Hidalgo has received numerous awards for her work as a lawyer, judge, and justice from organizations including the UST-Law Alumni Foundation, Philippine Judges Association, Philippine Women Judges Association, Integrated Bar of the Philippines, and Rotary Club District 3790. She was named the Most Outstanding RTC Judge of Caloocan City.

== Sources ==
This article incorporates text from a free content work. Licensed under public domain as a work of the Philippine government. Text taken from Knowledge Sharing on the Modernization of Criminal Law, Government of the Philippines. Philippine Judicial Academy.
