= Gener Gito =

Filipino associate justice of the Sandiganbayan

Honorable Gener Gito

75th Associate Justice of the Sandiganbayan
- Incumbent
- Assumed office October 10, 2024
- Appointed by: Bongbong Marcos
- Preceded by: Efren de la Cruz

RTC, Br. 206, Muntinlupa City
- In office December 2, 2019 – October 10, 2024

Personal details
- Born: Gener Malaluan Gito; July 17, 1971 (age 55)
- Spouse: Emily Laderas San Gaspar
- Education: University of Batangas (BA, Political Science); San Sebastian College–Recoletos (JD); Pamantasan ng Lungsod ng Maynila (LL.M.); University of Santo Tomas (Doctor of Civil Law, summa cum laude)
- Occupation: Judge, professor
- Awards: Chief Justice Cayetano Arellano Award for Judicial Excellence (2019)

Gener Malaluan Gito (born July 17, 1971) is a Filipino lawyer, educator, and politician who currently serves as an Associate Justice of the Sandiganbayan. He was appointed to the position by President Bongbong Marcos on October 10, 2024. Prior to his appointment, Gito was the Presiding Judge of the Regional Trial Court (RTC) of Muntinlupa City, Branch 206.

== Early life and education ==
Gener M. Gito is a native of Victoria, Oriental Mindoro.

He earned his Bachelor of Arts degree in Political Science from the University of Batangas and his Juris Doctor from San Sebastian College–Recoletos. After a decade in active litigation, he pursued further studies, completing his Master of Laws at the Pamantasan ng Lungsod ng Maynila with a thesis titled Chipping Off Executive Privilege: A Legislative Dilemma, graded "Excellent" by a panel headed by Justice Vicente V. Mendoza. He later obtained his Doctor of Civil Law degree from the University of Santo Tomas, graduating summa cum laude in 2016.

== Political career ==
In 2004, he was elected town councilor of Victoria, Oriental Mindoro.

== Judicial career ==
He first served as executive assistant and court attorney of the Court of Appeals from 1995 to 1998, and was also chief of the Senate's legal and legislative service from 2008 to 2014.

Gito served as Presiding Judge of the RTC, Branch 92, Balanga City, Bataan, and as Vice Executive Judge. Noted for significantly reducing his court's case backlog, he was designated Acting Presiding Judge of RTC Malolos, Branch 84, and Pairing Judge of Branch 83. He later served as Acting Presiding Judge of RTC Muntinlupa, Branch 256, before his appointment in 2020 to RTC Muntinlupa, Branch 206 on December 2, 2019

In November 2023, Gito granted bail to former Senator Leila de Lima in her last drug case and, in June 2024, acquitted her after granting a demurrer to evidence.

On October 10, 2024, President Marcos appointed him Associate Justice of the Sandiganbayan.

== Academic career ==
Alongside his judicial duties, Gito has taught Constitutional Law and Remedial Law at various Philippine law schools, including University of Santo Tomas, University of the East, Polytechnic University of the Philippines, San Sebastian College, University of Asia and the Pacific, Bulacan State University, Tarlac State University, University of Perpetual Help, and Lyceum of the Philippines University. He is also a Bar reviewer, MCLE lecturer, and member of the Philippine Judicial Academy.

== Personal life ==
His wife is the Associate Justice of the Court of Appeals, Hon. Emily San Gaspar-Gito.

== Awards and recognition ==
In 2019, Gito received the Chief Justice Cayetano Arellano Award for Judicial Excellence from the Society for Judicial Excellence, recognizing him as the most outstanding RTC judge in the Philippines.

He was also named the country's Most Outstanding RTC Judge.

Legal offices
Preceded by Efren de la Cruz	' Associate Justice of the Supreme Court of the Sandiganbayan; Oct 8, 2024–present	Succeeded by incumbent
