= Francisco Villaruz Jr. =

Sandiganbayan Presiding Justice

Francisco H. Villaruz Jr.

Presiding Justice of the Sandiganbayan
- In office October 5, 2011 – June 8, 2013
- Appointed by: Benigno Aquino III
- Preceded by: Edilberto G. Sandoval
- Succeeded by: Amparo M. Cabotaje-Tang

Associate Justice of the Sandiganbayan
- In office October 2, 2001 – October 5, 2011
- Appointed by: Gloria Macapagal Arroyo
- Preceded by: Rodolfo Ilarde
- Succeeded by: Amparo Cabotaje-Tang

Personal details
- Born: June 8, 1943 (age 82)
- Spouse: Teresita M. Villaruz

Francisco Hernandez Villaruz Jr. (born June 8, 1943) is a Filipino justice. He was appointed on October 5, 2011, by President Benigno Aquino III as Presiding Justice of the Sandiganbayan replacing Justice Edilberto Sandoval who retired last June 20, 2011. Justice Villaruz has been an associate justice of the Sandiganbayan since 2001. He took his oath before Supreme Court Chief Justice Renato C. Corona on October 12, 2011.

His most notable case was the plunder trial of former President Joseph Estrada, being a member of the Sandiganbayan Special Division that convicted Estrada of plunder.

== Profile ==
Villaruz's parents are Francisco Villaruz of Nueva Ecija and Consuelo Hernandez-Villaruz of Malabon. He is married to lawyer Teresita M. Villaruz. They have one child: Lawyer Carlos M. Villaruz.

Villaruz finished his elementary (1955) and high school education (1959) at the Ateneo de Manila University. He obtained his B.S. in Political Science degree from the Ateneo de Manila University in 1963 and his Bachelor of Laws degree from the University of the Philippines College of Law, where he graduated third in his class in 1967. He passed the Philippine Bar Examination of August 1967 with bar rating of 84.6%.

Villaruz worked in the private sector for almost four decades before being appointed associate justice of the Sandiganbayan in 2001. He is known for his professionalism and diligence, proof of which are the six decisions and 100 resolutions that he renders every month, and his 99 percent affirmance rating. A respected expert in his field, Villaruz was also Bar Examiner in Criminal Law in 2004 and an MCLE lecturer.

The Judicial and Bar Council (JBC) nominated Villaruz to the Supreme Court to fill the vacancy created by Angelina Sandoval-Gutierrez's retirement in 2008.

== Joseph Estrada plunder trial ==
Teresita de Castro, Justice Diosdado Peralta, and Villaruz formed the Sandiganbayan special division that tried Joseph Estrada for plunder. Former President Joseph Estrada was accused of stealing P4 billion (US$81 million; €62 million) and falsely declaring his assets. Co-accused were Senator Jinggoy Estrada and lawyer Eduardo Serapio.

In September 2007, de Castro, Peralta, and Villaruz were assigned extra bodyguards, allegedly after receiving threatening messages from an anonymous person.

=== The decision ===
On September 12, 2007, Presiding Justice de Castro, Peralta, and Villaruz convicted Joseph Estrada of plunder and sentenced him to reclusion perpetua with the accessory penalties of perpetual disqualification from public office and forfeiture of ill-gotten wealth and acquitted his son Senator Jinggoy Estrada and Serapio of plunder charges. Joseph Estrada was acquitted of perjury. The fallo of the 262-page decision declared the forfeiture in favor of the government: P542.701 million (bank accounts including interest), P189 million (Jose Velarde accounts including interest) and the Boracay mansion in New Manila, Quezon City.

=== Aftermath ===
In the aftermath of the verdict, on September 14, 2007, chief presidential legal counsel Sergio Antonio Apostol said that de Castro, Peralta, and Villaruz should decline the JBC nomination to the Supreme Court to ease pressure on President Gloria Macapagal Arroyo. Senate of the Philippines Majority Leader Francis Pangilinan, ex-officio member to the JBC, said that the three Sandiganbayan justices "should have the delicadeza not to accept a promotion to the highest tribunal to dispel any suspicion that they pronounced Mr. Estrada guilty expecting a reward from Palace ... We do not want to see a cloud of suspicion over the appointees to the Supreme Court. They should always be above suspicion."

On October 16, 2007, the JBC announced the final nominees to the Supreme Court associate justice post. These were de Castro, Appellate Justices Edgardo Cruz and Martin Villarama, Associate Justices Villaruz and Edilberto Sandoval, and Labor Secretary Arturo D. Brion.

On November 5, 2007, Senator Jinggoy Estrada, in a privileged speech, vowed to block the appointment to the Supreme Court of de Castro and Villaruz for convicting his father Joseph Estrada, as their appointment might "seem like a reward in exchange for the guilty verdict against the deposed President".

== Training courses ==
- Program of Instruction for Lawyers (June 2005 : Harvard Law School)
- First PHILJA Pre Judicature Program (July 2000:PHILJA)
- World Intellectual Property Conference (1994 : World Intellectual Property Organization)
- Management Development Program (1984 : Asian Institute of Management)

== See also ==
- Political history of the Philippines

Legal offices
Preceded by Ediberto Sandoval	Presiding Justice of the Sandiganbayan; 2011–2013	Succeeded by Gregory S. Ong (acting)
Preceded by Ricardo Ilarde	Associate Justice of the Sandiganbayan; 2001–2011	Succeeded by Amparo Cabotaje-Tang
