= Bernelito Fernandez =

Filipino associate justice of the Sandiganbayan (2016–2025)

Associate Justice Bernelito R. Fernandez
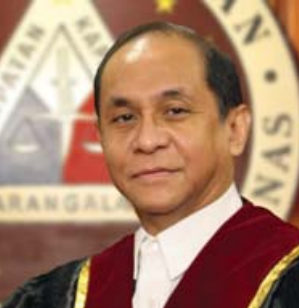

64th Associate Justice of the Sandiganbayan
- In office October 28, 2016 – June 9, 2025
- Preceded by: Teresita Diaz-Baldos
- Succeeded by: Hans Chester Nocom

Personal details
- Born: June 9, 1955 (age 71) Manila, Philippines
- Education: University of Santo Tomas (AB Political Science); San Beda College of Law (LLB)
- Occupation: Judge, Lawyer, Educator

Bernelito R. Fernandez (born June 9, 1955) is a Filipino lawyer, educator, and retired jurist who served as the 64th Associate Justice of the Sandiganbayan. He was appointed to the post on October 28, 2016, by President Rodrigo Duterte, replacing Justice Teresita Diaz-Baldos.

== Early life and education ==
Fernandez was born and raised in Manila, he was the son of Former Sandiganbayan Associate Justice Bernardo Fernandez. He earned his Bachelor of Arts in Political Science from the University of Santo Tomas in 1976. He graduated cum laude and class valedictorian from the San Beda College of Law in 1980, and passed the Philippine Bar Examination in 1981.

== Career ==
Fernandez began his government service as private secretary to his father, Associate Justice Bernardo P. Fernandez, first at the Sandiganbayan and later at the Tanodbayan.

He worked as private counsel for various corporations before joining the Department of Justice in 1988 as a state prosecutor. He was promoted to senior state prosecutor in 1993.

In September 1998, he was appointed presiding judge of the Regional Trial Court (RTC) Branch 68 in Binangonan, Rizal, and also served as executive judge from 2001 to 2004. He was later designated presiding judge of RTC Branch 97 in Quezon City in December 2004, where he also became executive judge in September 2016.

On October 28, 2016, he was appointed as Associate Justice of the Sandiganbayan.

== Academic work ==
Fernandez has served as a law professor and bar lecturer at San Beda University. In 2024, he was a Bar Examiner in Criminal Law for the Philippine Bar Examinations.

== Personal life ==
He is the son of former Tanodbayan Bernardo P. Fernandez, who prosecuted high-profile cases including those related to the assassination of Senator Benigno Aquino Jr. in 1983.
