= Geraldine Econg =

Filipino jurist, lawyer and Presiding Justice of the Sandiganbayan

Geraldine Faith Econg
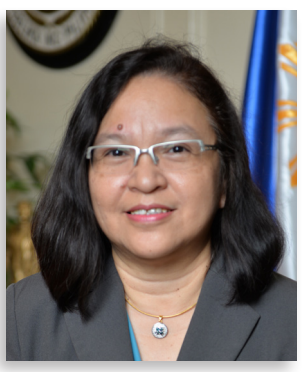

11th Presiding Justice of the Sandiganbayan
- Incumbent
- Assumed office January 7, 2025
- Appointed by: Bongbong Marcos
- Preceded by: Amparo Cabotaje-Tang

60th Associate Justice of the Sandiganbayan
- In office January 20, 2016 – January 7, 2025
- Appointed by: Benigno Aquino III
- Preceded by: Post established
- Succeeded by: Fritz Bryn Anthony Delos Santos

Personal details
- Born: Geraldine Faith Abracia Econg; August 6, 1967 (age 59) Philippines
- Education: University of San Carlos, B.A., J.D.
- Occupation: Judge
- Profession: Lawyer

Geraldine Faith Abracia Econg (born August 6, 1967) is a Filipino magistrate who serves as the Presiding Justice of the Sandiganbayan, the anti-graft court of the Philippines. She was appointed to the position by President Bongbong Marcos on January 7, 2025, succeeding Amparo Cabotaje-Tang.

Prior to her appointment as Presiding Justice, she served as an Associate Justice of the Sandiganbayan from 2016 to 2025.

== Early career and education ==
Econg, a cum laude law graduate from the University of San Carlos, began her judicial career as presiding judge in the municipal trial court of Minglanilla, Cebu, from 2002 to 2004. She then served as presiding judge of the Regional Trial Court, Branch 9 in Cebu City from 2004 to 2010.

In 2010, she was appointed Judicial Reform Program Administrator of the Supreme Court's Program Management Office, where she oversaw the implementation of the Action Program for Judicial Reform until 2015. She then headed the Philippine Mediation Center Office of the Philippine Judicial Academy from 2015 and 2016.

In January 2016, she was appointed associate justice of the Sandiganbayan, where she initially served in the First Division before becoming chair of the Second Division.

== Judicial appointments ==
In 2013, Econg was shortlisted by the Judicial and Bar Council (JBC) for a seat in the Court of Appeals in Cebu, and in 2014, she was also shortlisted for Deputy Ombudsman for the Visayas. In 2021, she was also nominated as one of the nine candidates for the position of Associate Justice of the Supreme Court.

On January 20, 2016, President Benigno Aquino III appointed her Associate Justice of the Sandiganbayan, where she chaired the Second Division before her promotion to Presiding Justice in 2025.

On January 7, 2025, Econg was appointed Presiding Justice of the Sandiganbayan by President Bongbong Marcos, succeeding Amparo Cabotaje-Tang. Although her term as Presiding Justice was set to continue until her mandatory retirement in 2037, she later applied for the position of Ombudsman in July 2025. The position was ultimately awarded to Justice Secretary Jesus Crispin Remulla in October of that year.

=== Notable cases ===
Econg has participated in several high-profile cases, including:

- Voting to acquit Senator Bong Revilla of plunder charges in connection with the pork barrel scam in 2018.
- Joining the special division that dismissed the plunder case against former senator Juan Ponce Enrile in 2024.
- Authoring the decision dismissing the last six coconut levy cases involving former president Ferdinand Marcos, former first lady Imelda Marcos, Enrile, and others.

As a trial court judge, she also presided over the parricide case against former lawmaker Ruben Ecleo Jr. and disputes involving the Mactan Cebu International Airport.

== Controversies ==
In 2007, Econg underwent drug testing after an anonymous accusation, which yielded no adverse findings. She also faced an administrative case related to an alleged marriage scam in Cebu, which was dismissed for lack of evidence.
