= Gregory S. Ong =

Filipino jurist

Associate Justice of the Sandiganbayan
- In office October 5, 1998 – September 23, 2014
- Appointed by: Joseph Estrada
- Preceded by: Jose Balajádia
- Succeeded by: Sarah Jane Fernandez

Personal details
- Born: May 25, 1953 (age 73) San Juan City, Metro Manila
- Spouse: Nancy L. Ong

Gregory Santos Ong (born May 25, 1953) is a Filipino jurist and a former Justice of the Sandiganbayan. He was initially appointed as an Associate Justice of the Supreme Court of the Philippines by President Gloria Macapagal Arroyo on May 16, 2007, but his appointment was subsequently withdrawn after questions arose whether he met the constitutional requirement of natural-born citizenship. On September 23, 2014, he was found guilty of gross misconduct, dishonesty and impropriety and was subsequently dismissed from his position as Justice of the Sandiganbayan by the Supreme Court of the Philippines as a result of an investigation linking him to pork barrel scam mastermind Janet Lim-Napoles.

== Family ==
Justice Ong is married to Nancy L. Ong with three children: Neil Gregory, Gregory and Nicole. Ong traces his ancestral lines to one Maria Santos of Malolos, Bulacan, born on November 25, 1881, who was allegedly a Filipino citizen who married Chan Kin, a Chinese citizen; that these two had a son, Juan Santos; that in 1906 Chan Kin died in China, as a result of which Maria Santos reverted to her Filipino citizenship; that at that time Juan Santos was a minor; that Juan Santos thereby also became a Filipino citizen; that Ong's mother, Dy Guiok Santos, is the daughter of the spouses Juan Santos and Sy Siok Hian, a Chinese citizen, who were married in 1927; that, therefore, Ong's mother was a Filipino citizen at birth; that Dy Guiok Santos later married a Chinese citizen, Eugenio Ong Han Seng, thereby becoming a Chinese citizen; that when Ong was eleven years old his father, Eugenio Ong Han Seng, was naturalized, and as a result he, his brothers and sisters, and his mother were included in the naturalization.

== Early life and career ==
Ong finished elementary and high school education at the Philippine Chinese Chen Kuang (1966) and at the Jose Rizal College (with honors, 1970), respectively. Ong earned his AB Political Science degree at Far Eastern University (1975), and his Bachelor of Laws at San Beda College of Law (1979), where he became Grand Judex of Lex Talionis Fraternitas.

Ong passed the 1979 Philippine Bar Examination with a bar rating of 76.45%.

He studied Master of Laws at the Manuel L. Quezon University (1992). Before his aborted Supreme Court appointment, Ong was the Chairman of the 4th Division of the anti-graft court Sandiganbayan.

== Supreme Court appointment controversy ==
Since the creation of the Philippine Supreme Court in 1901, no presidential appointment of a Supreme Court Associate had ever been nullified by the High Tribunal. But on July 3, 2007, the Adolfo Azcuna judgment made history. The Court granted the petition of two foundations that sought to block Ong's appointment over the citizenship issue. Azcuna wrote that Ong would be unable to join them on the bench "until he had proven in court that he was a natural-born Filipino citizen and corrected the records of his birth and citizenship". The court declared its decision to be final and effective immediately.

The court voted 13–0 in favor of petitioners Kilosbayan and Bantay Katarungan foundations (Senate President Jovito Salonga and Emilio Capulong). The suit was to enjoin President Gloria Macapagal Arroyo's appointment of Ong (54—Ms Arroyo's 12th appointee to the tribunal) to replace retired Justice Romeo Callejo, Sr. Ong told reporters that: “I am truly saddened by the decision of the high court, but I respect it. “I am a Filipino. I lived and will live my life as a Filipino, and I raised my children as law-abiding Filipinos.”

Meanwhile, one of the top contenders for the vacancy is Sandiganbayan Presiding Justice Teresita De Castro, who heads the anti-graft court's special division on the Erap plunder case. Estrada's conviction is perceived to boost her bid to become the fifteenth member of the high court. Reporters noted that “De Castro is hoping that she will be the one appointed because she has the highest number of votes; “Therefore, to get appointed to the Supreme Court, she will probably convict Erap." The Sandiganbayan, has 90 days or until mid-September 2007 to decide the case of former President Joseph Ejercito Estrada, but the decision could be issued much sooner than that. The Supreme Court's July 3 decision to reject the appointment of Gregory Ong as an associate justice of the Supreme Court sets the stage for the conviction of Estrada. Another indicator that a decision could come sooner than later is the July 4 full-page paid advertisement—“Erap: Guilty or not guilty. Kailangan bang may gulo?" in at least five broadsheet daily newspapers urging the people to respect the Sandiganbayan's decision in the plunder trial.

On July 26, 2007, retired Supreme Court Justice Vicente Mendoza, a noted constitutionalist, said that there was no vacancy at the moment since the President had already appointed Ong. Mendoza said there was no declaration that Ong was not a natural-born Filipino and he was given a chance to file a correction of entry via adversarial proceedings in the regional trial court.

On August 1, 2007, President Arroyo appointed CA Justice Ruben T. Reyes to replace Ong. Ong voluntarily withdrew his nomination, because of the controversy.

=== Questions on citizenship ===
On September 28, 2007, Gregory Ong filed a seven-page comment (to the administrative complaint of Special Prosecutor Dennis Villa-Ignacio) with the Supreme Court of the Philippines. Ong alleged that he "should remain at his post even as the Court has ordered him to prove his citizenship status before the Pasig Regional Trial Court". Ong also contradicted the motive: “Villa-Ignacio does not enjoy appearing in Ong’s division.”

On December 11, 2007, the Supreme Court of the Philippines en banc in a 2-page resolution, ordered Ong to file his comment within 10 days why he should not be removed from the Sandiganbayan. Meanwhile, Ong is now an automatic candidate for the position of Sandiganbayan presiding justice after Justice Teresita de Castro. Further, a powerful religious organization is lobbying for Ong's ouster from the judiciary.

== Trial court victory ==
On November 21, 2007, Gregory Ong was declared natural-born Filipino citizen. In a Judgment, Leoncio Janolo Jr., Branch 264, Pasig regional trial court granted Ong's petition to be recognized as a natural-born Filipino citizen, qualifying him to be an associate justice of the Supreme Court. The Civil Registrar of San Juan, Metro Manila was directed to annotate in the Certificate of Birth of Ong the decision. Ong acquired Philippine citizenship when he was still a minor on the basis of the naturalization of his father, Eugenio Ong Han Seng. The judgment dismissed objections to Ong's appointment to the Supreme Court of the Philippines and tenure at the Sandiganbayan, further holding that the petitioner and oppositor were not the real adversarial litigants in their citizenship issue, ruling the 2 foundations are “merely would-be oppositors and not actual or bona fide oppositors,” and they are “not real parties in interest who actually stand to be injured or prejudiced by a judgment or decree” granting Ong's petition.

On November 20, 2007, the Supreme Court of the Philippines received the judgment of Regional Trial Court, Br. 264, Pasig (in Sp. Proc. No. 11767, entitled "In re: amendment / correction / supplementation or annotation of entry in the certificate of live birth of Gregory S. Ong vs. the Local Civil Register of San Juan; Kilosbayan and Bantay Katarungan, oppositors"), which ruled that Ong is a natural born Filipino citizen.

On December 4, 2007, the oppositions Kilosbayan and Bantay Katarungan headed by Jovito Salonga stated that Judge Janolo denied their motion for reconsideration, and they appealed to the High Court to reverse the lower court's decision on account of “grave error.” The High Tribunal has yet to resolve 2 separate pleadings filed before it regarding Ong's citizenship: a) the letter-query of Special Prosecutor Dennis Villa-Ignacio on Ong's status as Sandiganbayan justice, and b) the Quo Warranto petition filed by Iglesia ni Cristo lawyer Ferdinand Topacio, who asked the Court to stop Ong from exercising his role as Sandiganbayan justice because of his questionable citizenship.

== Corruption allegations, dismissal from Sandiganbayan, and later clemency ==
On September 23, 2014, the Supreme Court of the Philippines issued a ruling dismissing Gregory Ong from the Sandiganbayan. Following the testimony of pork barrel scam whistleblower Benhur Luy to the Philippine Senate tagging Ong as the main contact into the Sandiganbayan of pork barrel scam mastermind Janet Lim-Napoles, Chief Justice Maria Lourdes Sereno ordered for an investigation that subsequently found credence in Luy's accusations.

With the Court voting 8-5 (with two abstentions), the ruling found Ong "guilty of gross misconduct, dishonesty and impropriety under the new code of judicial conduct for the Philippine judiciary." Along with his dismissal from office, Ong's retirement benefits were also forfeited. He is also perpetually barred from re-employment in any instrumentality of the Government. Ong voted for the acquittal of Napoles in a malversation case filed in 2010.

In 2021, Ong was granted a partial clemency from the Supreme Court, citing in part Ong's declining health. His pension was repaid in full as well as his renewed qualification for employment in any government related agency or institution.

== See also ==
- Philippine nationality law

Preceded by Jose Balajádia	Associate Justice of the Sandiganbayan; 1996–2014	Succeeded by Sarah Jane Fernndez
Preceded by Francisco Villaruz Jr.	Acting Presiding Justice of the Sandiganbayan; 2013	Succeeded by Amparo Cabotaje-Tang
