= Karl Miranda =

Filipino lawyer, academic, and jurist (born 1957)

The Honorable Karl Miranda
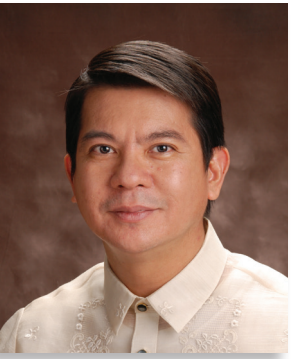

62nd Associate Justice of the Sandiganbayan
- Incumbent
- Assumed office January 20, 2016
- Appointed by: Benigno Aquino III

Personal details
- Born: October 9, 1957 (age 69) Philippines
- Children: 3
- Education: Ateneo de Manila University (BS Business Management); University of the Philippines College of Law (LLB); John F. Kennedy School of Government, Harvard University (MPA)
- Occupation: Judge
- Profession: Lawyer

Karl Belandres Miranda (born October 9, 1957) is a Filipino lawyer, academic, and jurist who currently serves as the 62nd Associate Justice of the Sandiganbayan, the Philippines’ special anti-graft court. He was appointed to the position by President Benigno Aquino III on January 20, 2016.

== Education ==
Miranda earned his Bachelor of Science in Business Management from the Ateneo de Manila University. He later obtained his Bachelor of Laws degree from the University of the Philippines College of Law, and pursued a Master in Public Administration at the John F. Kennedy School of Government, Harvard University.

== Career ==
=== Office of the Solicitor General ===
Miranda joined the Office of the Solicitor General (OSG) in 1986. Rising through the ranks, he was appointed Assistant Solicitor General in 1999, heading the Sedfrey A. Ordoñez Division.

During his tenure at the OSG, he participated in numerous significant cases for the Philippine government, including:

- The appeal of Sarah Balabagan before the United Arab Emirates appellate court.
- The Flor Contemplacion case, where he was involved in last-minute efforts to halt her execution in Singapore, and in the subsequent government investigation that led to the passage of the landmark Migrant Worker's Act.
- The Gulf War claims of the Republic of the Philippines against Iraq before the United Nations Compensation Commission in Geneva, Switzerland.

His advocacy for better compensation and benefits for government lawyers contributed to the passage of R.A. 9417, the OSG Reform Law, as well as similar legislation that improved the salaries and benefits of employees in other agencies under the Department of Justice.

=== Appointment to the Sandiganbayan ===
Miranda was appointed as the 62nd Associate Justice of the Sandiganbayan on January 20, 2016. He is the Chairperson of the court's Third Division.

He also co-chairs the Judiciary-Wide Committee on Data Reconciliation and represents the Judiciary at the Justice Sector Coordinating Council, composed of the Supreme Court, Department of Justice, and the Department of the Interior and Local Government. He is a member of the Judiciary's Technical Working Group (TWG) on Sectoral Planning and Budgeting, the Supreme Court Subcommittee on the revision of the Rules on Civil Procedure, and the Criminal Law Department of the Philippine Judicial Academy.

On July 31, 2026, Miranda was the dissenting vote among three justices in the 3rd Division's ruling that granted the bail petition of former senator Bong Revilla at ₱1 million in his malversation case involving an anomalous flood control project in Pandi, Bulacan. The decision was based on the argument that the prosecution's evidence is "not enough to establish that the evidence of guilt against accused Revilla is strong." The court's ruling was criticized for the perceived unequal granting of bail amongst the seven respondents in the malversation case, with Revilla, a politician, being the sole person granted bail. In Miranda's dissenting opinion, he called the court's decision "difficult to justify", and stated that with the alleged scheme's design, "the diversion of public funds is committed through manipulation of the project identification, funding, and procurement processes. [...] In this [scheme] within the DPWH, commissions or 'commitments' received by the project proponent from contractors ultimately come from the budget allocated for the projects, necessitating the diversion of public funds. [...] Revilla's acts, as project proponent, therefore formed an indispensable part of the common criminal design..."

== Advocacy and community involvement ==
Outside the bench, Miranda has been active in teaching and community service. In 2011, together with other OSG lawyers, he pioneered the establishment of E-Dalaw, a computerized prison visitation system in various Philippine jails. He also co-founded the Bilibid Puzakals, the Bureau of Corrections’ first soccer team composed of inmates, with his son Atty. Lorenzo Gabriel Miranda.

He has taught at the prison college inside the New Bilibid Prison in Muntinlupa, where inmates study to earn degrees while serving sentences. He also teaches an anti-corrpution elective at the University of the Philippines Diliman - College of Law along with Atty. Angelo Karl Doceo.

He was awarded as the 2026 UPAA Distinguished Alumni Award in Good Governance (Judicial Reforms) by the University of the Philippines Alumni Association back in August 2026.
