= Maryann Corpus-Mañalac =

Filipino associate justice of the Sandiganbayan

Associate Justice Maryann Corpus-Mañalac
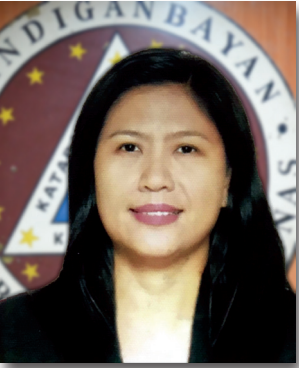

69th Associate Justice of the Sandiganbayan
- Incumbent
- Assumed office December 8, 2017
- Preceded by: Maria Cristina Cornejo

Personal details
- Born: Maryann E. Corpus; July 27, 1966 (age 60)
- Education: University of Santo Tomas (AB Political Science); San Beda College of Law (LLB); University of Santo Tomas (MA Public Administration, magna cum laude); University of the Philippines Diliman (Doctor of Public Administration, ongoing)
- Profession: Lawyer, Judge, Professor

Maryann Corpus-Mañalac (born July 27, 1966) is a Filipino lawyer, academic, and jurist who currently serves as the 69th Associate Justice of the Sandiganbayan. She was appointed on December 8, 2017, by President Rodrigo Duterte, becoming his fifth appointee to the anti-graft court.

== Education ==
Corpus-Mañalac earned her bachelor's degree in political science from the University of Santo Tomas and her Bachelor of Laws from San Beda College of Law in 1991, ranking fifth in her graduating class of 96. She later pursued graduate studies in public administration at UST, graduating magna cum laude in 1998. In 2015, she was admitted to the Doctor of Public Administration program of the University of the Philippines Diliman National College of Public Administration and Governance (NCPAG).

== Career ==
=== Early career ===
Corpus-Mañalac began her government service at the Office of the Ombudsman, serving as a Graft Investigation Officer and later as Resident Ombudsman from 1994 to 2003.

=== Judiciary ===
She joined the judiciary in 1992 as Branch Clerk of Court of the Malolos, Bulacan Regional Trial Court (RTC) Branch 8. From 2004 to 2007, she was Presiding Judge of RTC Sta. Cruz, Laguna Branch 28 and Acting Presiding Judge of RTC Branch 27. In 2007, she was appointed Presiding Judge of Makati City RTC Branch 141, concurrently serving in other trial courts in Malolos and Taguig in later years.

In August 2017, as Makati RTC Branch 141 judge, she ordered the ejectment of Sunvar Realty Development Corporation and tenants from the government-owned Mile Long Property in Makati, which had been leased by the Rufino and Prieto families, owners of the Philippine Daily Inquirer.

=== Sandiganbayan ===
On December 8, 2017, President Duterte appointed Corpus-Mañalac as Associate Justice of the Sandiganbayan. She sits in the court's Fifth Division and is expected to serve until her mandatory retirement in 2036.

== Academic work ==
Corpus-Mañalac taught law at New Era University (2009–2013) and lectured for various government agencies on accountability, graft prevention, and ethics in public service.

== Awards ==
- Chief Justice Cayetano Arellano Award for Outstanding RTC Judges, 2013, Society for Judicial Excellence
- Recognition from Integrated Bar of the Philippines – Bulacan Chapter, Makati Judges Association, and the Philippine Women Judges Association
