= Lorifel Lacap-Pahimna =

Filipino associate justice of the Sandiganbayan

Honorable Lorifel Pahimna
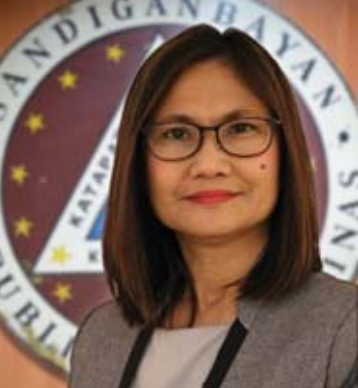

65th Associate Justice of the Sandiganbayan
- Incumbent
- Assumed office March 1, 2017
- Preceded by: Napoleon Inoturan

Personal details
- Born: February 10, 1961 (age 65)
- Profession: Judge, Lawyer

Lorifel Lacap-Pahimna (born February 10, 1961) is a Filipino lawyer and jurist who currently serves as the 65th Associate Justice of the Sandiganbayan. She was appointed to the court by President Rodrigo Duterte on March 1, 2017, replacing Associate Justice Napoleon Inoturan.

== Early life and education ==
Pahimna was born to Filomena Lacap Pahimna and Lorenzo de Guzman Pahimna. She completed her elementary education at Ramon Magsaysay Elementary School and secondary education at Victorino Mapa High School. She earned her Bachelor in Business Management, major in Marketing, cum laude, from the Polytechnic University of the Philippines. In 1986, she obtained her Bachelor of Laws degree from the San Beda College of Law.

== Career ==
Pahimna passed the Philippine Bar Examination in 1987 and later served as judge of the Regional Trial Courts (RTC) of Pasig City and Taguig City. She became executive judge of the Taguig RTC before her appointment to the Sandiganbayan.

In June 2002, then Quezon City Regional Trial Court Judge Lorifel Pahimna granted the annulment of the marriage between actors Carmina Villarroel and Rustom Padilla, which had been solemnized in 1994.

In 2007, she sentenced 14 members of the Abu Sayyaf Group to life imprisonment for their involvement in the 2001 Dos Palmas kidnapping in Palawan.

During the 2016 presidential campaign, Pahimna issued a 72-hour temporary restraining order prohibiting ABS-CBN from airing a political advertisement critical of then-presidential candidate Rodrigo Duterte. She ruled that the ad, which showed children reacting to Duterte's controversial statements, constituted "black propaganda" and was harmful to the welfare of minors.

== Awards and recognitions ==
Pahimna has received numerous awards throughout her judicial career. In 2008, she was conferred the Chief Justice Jose Abad Santos Award for Outstanding Regional Trial Court Judge by the Supreme Court and the Society for Judicial Excellence. Other honors include:

- Gawad Bunying Abogadong Bulakenyo, Integrated Bar of the Philippines – Bulacan Chapter (2014)
- Certificate of Recognition for competence, integrity and independence, Philippine Women Judges Association (2014)
- Certificate of Recognition, Philippine Association of Court Employees – National Capital Judicial Region (2013)
- Outstanding Jubilarian, San Beda Alumni Association (2011)
- Plaque of Recognition for Excellence in Chosen Field, Lambda Rho Sigma Sorority (2010)
- Plaque of Recognition for Dedication to the Service and Exemplary Performance, Philippine Judges Association (2008)
- Special Award for the Outstanding Judge, Volunteers Against Crime and Corruption (2007)
- Blue Falcon Award for Distinguished Achievement in the Field of Judiciary, V. Mapa High School (2004)
- Exemplary Judicial Service Award as Presiding Judge of Metropolitan Trial Court, Branch 73, Pateros, Municipality of Pateros (2001)
- Certificate of Recognition for Outstanding Service, Devotion to Duty, Dedication and Loyalty as Branch Clerk of Court, Regional Trial Court of Pasig Employees Association
