= Oscar Herrera, Jr. =

Oscar Herrera Jr.

54th Associate Justice of the Sandiganbayan
- In office April 26, 2011 – May 23, 2024
- Appointed by: Benigno Aquino III
- Preceded by: Edilberto Sandoval
- Succeeded by: Gener Gito

Personal details
- Born: Oscar Herrera Jr. May 23, 1954 (age 72)
- Spouse: Julieta Herrera
- Children: 2
- Education: University of Santo Tomas (AB Political Science, 1975); University of Santo Tomas Faculty of Civil Law (LL.B., 1979)
- Occupation: Lawyer, Judge, Professor

Oscar Calalang Herrera Jr. (born May 23, 1954) is a Filipino lawyer, jurist, and professor who served as the 54th Associate Justice of the Sandiganbayan from 2011 until his retirement in 2024. He is also known for his work in legal education and service to alumni organizations of the University of Santo Tomas (UST).

== Early life and education ==
Herrera is the second child of retired Court of Appeals Associate Justice Oscar M. Herrera Sr. and Rosario Calalang-Herrera. He earned his bachelor's degree in Political Science from the UST Faculty of Arts and Letters in 1975. He later pursued law at the UST Faculty of Civil Law while working at the Department of Trade as a commercial researcher. He passed the bar examinations in 1979.

== Career ==
Herrera began his judicial career in 1994 when he was appointed Presiding Judge of the Bulacan Regional Trial Court under President Fidel V. Ramos. He also served as acting presiding judge and assisting judge at the Quezon City Regional Trial Court (1995–1996), and later as Vice Executive Judge of Bulacan RTC (1999–2001).

In recognition of his judicial service, Herrera received the Chief Justice Ramon Avanceña Award for Judicial Excellence in 2003 and the Dangal ng Bayan Award the following year.

On April 26, 2011, President Benigno Aquino III appointed him as Associate Justice of the Sandiganbayan, the Philippines' anti-graft court. He served until his retirement on May 23, 2024.

== Academic career ==
Herrera has been active in legal education, teaching at San Beda College, Pamantasan ng Lungsod ng Maynila, Far Eastern University, and the UST Faculty of Civil Law, where he taught Civil Law, Remedial Law, Trial Practice Court and Law, and Values Education.

He also served as vice president and later president of the UST Law Alumni Association, revitalizing the organization during
