= Ronald Moreno =

Filipino judge

The Honourable Ronald Moreno

Associate Justice of the Sandiganbayan
- Incumbent
- Assumed office June 8, 2018
- Appointed by: Rodrigo Duterte
- Preceded by: Alexander Gesmundo

Personal details
- Born: January 23, 1970 (age 56)
- Education: University of Santo Tomas Faculty of Civil Law (JD)

Ronald Bautista Moreno is a Filipino judge who is currently serving as Associate Justice of the Sandiganbayan. He succeeded Justice Alexander Gesmundo who was appointed Associate Justice of the Supreme Court of the Philippines. On July 31, 2026, Moreno voted to grant the bail petition of former senator Bong Revilla during his flood control malversation case, resulting in the court's controversial decision to approve Revilla's bail at ₱1 million.

== Early life and education ==
Moreno graduated from the University of Santo Tomas, where he received his law degree. He passed the Philippine Bar Examination in 1995.

== Judicial career ==
Moreno served as presiding judge at the Makati Regional Trial Court, Branch 147 from his 2012 appointment by President Benigno Aquino III until mid-2018.

On June 8, 2018, Moreno was appointed by President Rodrigo Duterte as Associate Justice of the Sandiganbayan for its Third Division.

In January 2020, Moreno concurred in the decision by the Sandiganbayan's Third Division to convict Al Vitangcol III, the former general manager of Metro Rail Transit 3 (MRT 3), for graft and violation of procurement law due to giving advantage to PH Trams, of which his uncle-in-law Arturo Soriano served as incorporator, in winning a 2012 maintenance contract from the Department of Transportation and Communications (DOTC) by remaining silent on his connection to Soriano.

In June 2021, Moreno was among the four out of five Sandiganbayan justices in the Third Division who voted to acquit former Makati mayor Elenita Binay in her graft case involving her alleged granting of a ₱45 million contract to Apollo Medical Equipment and Supplies in supplying hospital beds and sterilizers to Ospital ng Makati in 2000 and 2001 without public bidding; two of her co-accused, administrative officer Jaime delos Reyes and supply officer Conrado Paminutan, were otherwise convicted. By 2024, all of Binay charges were cleared by the Sandiganbayan two decades after their initial filing.

In August 2025, Moreno penned the 202-page Sandiganbayan decision to acquit former vice president Jejomar Binay, his son and former Makati mayor Junjun, and 22 other co-accused in five counts of graft involving an allegedly overpriced car park building constructed for ₱2.3 billion as part of Makati City Hall. In the decision, Moreno cited the prosecution's failure in proving their guilt beyond a reasonable doubt: "that the statements contained in the assailed documents were absolutely false. Consequently, the allegation of conspiracy must also fail."

On July 31, 2026, Moreno was one of two Sandiganbayan justices in the Third Division who voted to grant the bail petition of former senator Bong Revilla during his malversation case involving an anomalous flood control project in Pandi, Bulacan, resulting in the court's decision to approve Revilla's bail at ₱1 million on the basis that the prosecution's evidence is "not enough to establish that the evidence of guilt against accused Revilla is strong." The decision has been criticized for the perceived unequal granting of bail amongst the seven respondents in the malversation case, with Revilla, a politician, being the sole person granted bail by the Sandiganbayan. Due to this, the Ombudsman filed a motion on August 24, 2026 to have Moreno voluntarily inhibit himself from the case citing Moreno's aggressive line of questioning, alleged insults toward prosecution witnesses, and public remarks as evidence of partiality and prejudgment. While the Ombudsman did not say that Moreno did it in bad faith, they questioned his ability to try the case with complete impartiality.

Legal offices
Preceded by Alexander Gesmundo	Associate Justice of the Sandiganbayan; 2018–present	Incumbent
