= Reynaldo Cruz =

Filipino jurist (1955–2020)

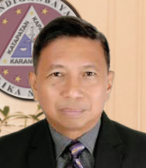

59th Associate Justice of the Sandiganbayan
- In office January 20, 2016 – February 21, 2020
- Appointed by: Benigno Aquino III
- Preceded by: Seat Created
- Succeeded by: Arthur Malabaguio

Personal details
- Born: July 8, 1955
- Died: February 21, 2020 (aged 64) Manila, Philippines
- Occupation: Judge, Lawyer

Reynaldo P. Cruz (July 8, 1955 – 21 February 2020) was a Filipino jurist who served as the 59th Associate Justice of the Sandiganbayan from 2016 until his death in 2020. He was a senior member of the court's Fourth Division and participated in high-profile cases involving graft and corruption of government officials.

== Early life and career ==
Reynaldo Cruz was born on 8 July 1955 in Manila, Philippines, to parents who were both career public servants. He majored in Journalism at the University of the Philippines and obtained his Bachelor of Laws degree in 1991 from the same university, while working as chief of the Public Information Office of the National Economic and Development Authority (NEDA).

In November 1991, Cruz joined the law firm Bautista, Picazo, Buyco Tan and Fider and engaged in litigation practice for 19 years with various law firms. He returned to government service in 2010 and served as Undersecretary and head of the Strategic Initiatives Management Office (SIMO) at the Office of the President (Philippines) until his appointment to the Sandiganbayan on 20 January 2016.

Cruz previously served as an undersecretary at the Office of the Executive Secretary (Philippines) during the administration of President Benigno Aquino III. He was appointed to the Sandiganbayan on 20 January 2016.

== Notable decisions ==
Cruz concurred in several important rulings, including:

- Convicting former Laguna governor Emilio Ramon “ER” Ejercito of graft.
- Pressing law enforcers to arrest the co-accused of former President Joseph Estrada in the P4.1 billion plunder case.
- Voting for the preventive suspension of Deputy Speaker Prospero Pichay Jr. over graft allegations.
- Concurred in the 3-2 decision granting bail to former senator Jinggoy Estrada in the pork barrel scam cases.
- Dismissal of graft and usurpation cases against former President Aquino, PNP chief Alan Purisima, and PNP-SAF director Getulio Napeñas Jr. over the Mamasapano incident.

== Death ==
Cruz died of pneumonia on 21 February 2020 at the age of 64.

== Sources ==
This article incorporates text from a free content work. Licensed under public domain as a work of the Philippine government. Text taken from Philja Bulletin, Government of the Philippines. Research, Publications and Linkages Office of the Philippine Judicial Academy.
