= Michael Frederick Musñgi =

Filipino lawyer and Associate Justice of the Sandiganbayan

The Honorable Michael Frederick Musngi
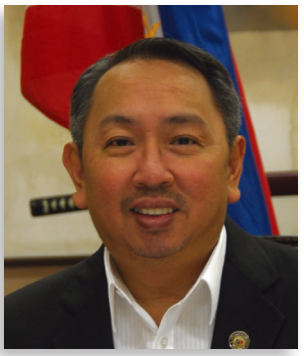

58th Sandiganbayan Associate Justice
- Incumbent
- Assumed office January 20, 2016
- Preceded by: Seat Created

Personal details
- Born: April 14, 1965 (age 60) Manila, Philippines
- Spouse: Ma. Carmen S. Musngi
- Children: 2
- Nickname: Mike

Michael Frederick de Leon Musñgi (born April 14, 1965) (commonly known as Mike Musñgi), is a Filipino lawyer, Associate Justice of the Sandiganbayan, and veteran public servant with over two decades of experience in both the Executive and Judicial branches of government. Since his appointment as Associate Justice in 2016, he has served with distinction, becoming Chairperson of the Court’s Fourth Division in 2022.

== Early life and education ==
Musngi was born in Manila and completed his primary and secondary education at the Colegio de San Juan de Letran. He earned his AB in Social Sciences from the Ateneo de Manila University in 1986, and later obtained his Juris Doctor degree from the Lyceum of the Philippines – College of Law in 1991. He passed the Philippine Bar in 1992 (Roll No. 47688) and is a member of the IBP Bulacan Chapter.

Musngi earned his Bachelor of Arts in Social Sciences from the Ateneo de Manila University in 1986 and his Juris Doctor from the Lyceum of the Philippines University in 1991. He attended Ateneo Law School from 1986 to 1991 and completed his primary and secondary education at the Colegio de San Juan de Letran.

== Earlier career ==
Earlier in his career, he practiced law at Moncupa & Partners (2003–2009), served as Chief of Staff at the Department of Agrarian Reform (2002–2003), Attorney IV and Acting Head of the Legal Division at the Fertilizer and Pesticide Authority, and Department Manager at the Ecology Center of the Subic Bay Metropolitan Authority (SBMA) from 1999 to 2001.

== Executive branch service ==
From 2010 to 2016, he was Undersecretary at the Office of the President, concurrently serving as Chief of Staff to the Executive Secretary, Head of the Office of Special Concerns, and Head of Procuring Entity. During this period, he represented the Executive Secretary in several national bodies, including:

- Concurrently headed the Office of Special Concerns.
- Served as Chief of Staff to the Office of the Executive Secretary.
- Represented the Executive Secretary in national security and anti-crime councils such as the Anti-Terrorism Council, the Presidential Anti-Organized Crime Commission (PAOCC), and the Inter-Agency Council Against Trafficking (IACAT).
- Oversaw agencies including the Philippine Charity Sweepstakes Office (PCSO), NHA, Philippine National Railways (PNR), Maritime Industry Authority (MARINA), and the Urban Triangle Development Commission (TRIDEV).
- Philippine Center on Transnational Crime (PCTC)
- National Coast Watch Council

He was also an ad hoc member of the Judicial and Bar Council during the selection of the Chief Justice to replace Renato Corona.

He was designated as Oversight Officer of the Philippine Charity Sweepstakes Office (PCSO) and served as ad hoc Member of the Judicial and Bar Council during the selection process for the new Chief Justice following the impeachment of Chief Justice Renato Corona.

Musngi also served as Ex-Officio Member of the Board of Directors of several government agencies, including:

- National Housing Authority (NHA)
- Philippine National Railways (PNR)
- Maritime Industry Authority (MARINA)
- Urban Triangle Development Commission (TRIDEV)
- Presidential Agrarian Reform Council (PARC)
- Career Executive Service Board (CESB)

== Judicial career ==
Musngi was appointed Associate Justice of the Sandiganbayan in 2016. He became Chairperson of the Fourth Division in August 2022. Under his leadership, the division achieved a 148% case clearance rate in 2024, rendering over 700 dispositions.

His landmark decisions include:

- Convictions of local chief executives charged with malversation and falsification.
- The high-profile Euro General case on undeclared foreign currency=
- Cases involving PCGG-sequestered properties in civil forfeiture suits.

Under his leadership, the division achieved a 148% clearance rate in 2024, rendering over 700 case dispositions, largely due to the dismissal of around 600 archived cases, significantly contributing to judicial decongestion.

As of 2025, six of his ponencias have reached the Supreme Court, with three affirmed and three reversed.

=== Marcos Wealth Case Dismissal ===
In November 2019, Associate Justice Michael Frederick L. Musngi authored the Sandiganbayan Second Division’s resolution affirming the dismissal of a ₱1.052-billion civil forfeiture case against the Marcos family. The court ruled that the Presidential Commission on Good Government (PCGG) failed to present sufficient and authentic evidence to support its claims, including reliance on photocopied documents that violated the Best Evidence Rule.

Musngi’s resolution upheld the dismissal, emphasizing the lack of new arguments and proof linking the Marcoses to the alleged ill-gotten wealth.

=== Controversy ===
Musngi, a member of the Ateneo Law School's Aquila Legis fraternity, was previously cleared in the controversial 1991 homicide case involving Ateneo law student Jose Leonardo “Lenny” Villa, as detailed in a Supreme Court ruling. On the night of the incident, Musngi was reported to have briefed fraternity neophytes, including Villa, on initiation rites.

== Academic and professional engagement ==
Musngi has taught Criminal Procedure at the University of Santo Tomas Faculty of Civil Law (2019–2020) and the Manuel L. Quezon University School of Law (2018–2019). He served as a Bar Examiner in Remedial Law I in 2022.

He has completed judicial training programs, including:

- Judicial Executive Leadership – Harvard Law School / National Judicial College (2024)
- Mindfulness for Judges – National Judicial College, USA (2022)
- Advanced Bench Skills: Procedural Fairness – National Judicial College, USA (2018)
- Procurement in Transition – Government Procurement Policy Board – TSO (2025)
- 14th ASEAN Law Association General Assembly and Law Conference – Kuala Lumpur, Malaysia (2023)
- 7th ICAC Symposium – Hong Kong (2019)
- National Decongestion Summit – Justice Sector Coordinating Council (2023)

== Recognitions ==
Musngi is:

- Chairperson, Sandiganbayan Committee on Acquisition, Procurement, Maintenance, and Disposal of Facilities and Supplies
- Vice-Chairperson, Technical Working Group on Communication and Partnerships, JSCC
- Co-Chairperson, Sandiganbayan Committee on Gender-Responsiveness
- Member, Supreme Court Committee on Gender-Responsiveness

He was recognized in 2018 as one of Colegio de San Juan de Letran's Quadricentennial "Grandes Figuras", honoring 400 distinguished alumni for their professional excellence and public service.
