= Bayani Jacinto =

Filipino lawyer, jurist, and associate justice of the Sandiganbayan

The Honorable Bayani Jacinto
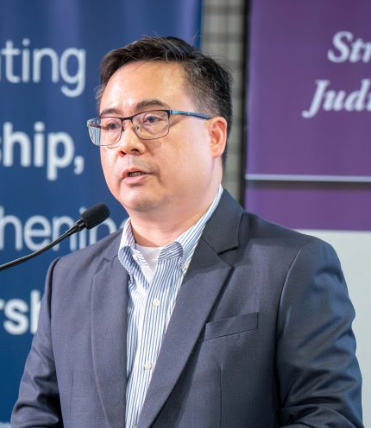

67th Associate Justice of the Sandiganbayan
- Incumbent
- Assumed office May 29, 2017
- Preceded by: Roland Jurado

Personal details
- Born: April 30, 1969 (age 57) Dapitan City, Zamboanga del Norte, Philippines
- Spouse: Erika Regina Verzola
- Relations: Godardo A. Jacinto (father) – former Acting Presiding Justice, Court of Appeals; Evangeline Hamoy Jacinto (mother); Eubulo G. Verzola (father-in-law) – former Acting Presiding Justice, Court of Appeals; Atty. Cleofe Verzola (mother-in-law)
- Children: 2
- Education: Ateneo de Manila University (B.A. Political Science, J.D.)
- Occupation: Judge, Lawyer

Bayani Hamoy Jacinto (born April 30, 1969) is a Filipino lawyer and jurist who currently serves as the 67th Associate Justice of the Sandiganbayan. He was appointed to the anti-graft court on May 29, 2017, by President Rodrigo Duterte.

== Early life and education ==
Jacinto was born in Dapitan City, Zamboanga del Norte, to former Court of Appeals Acting Presiding Justice Godardo A. Jacinto and Dr. Evangeline Hamoy Jacinto.

He obtained his Bachelor of Arts degree in political science in 1990 and his Juris Doctor degree in 1994, both from the Ateneo de Manila University. He passed the 1994 Bar Examinations with a rating of 85.05 percent.

== Legal career ==
After law school, Jacinto worked at the Court of Appeals until 1997, when he left to engage in private practice. In 2001, he became the Managing Partner of the Jacinto Magtanong Wui Jacinto Esguerra and Uy Law Offices.

== Government service ==
In December 2010, Jacinto joined government service as Director for the Legal Department of the Presidential Commission on Good Government. In August 2012, he transferred to the Office of the Ombudsman, where he served as Director of the Prosecution Bureau and later as Acting Assistant Ombudsman for Luzon.

On May 29, 2017, Jacinto was appointed Associate Justice of the Sandiganbayan.

== Personal life ==
Jacinto is married to Erika Regina Verzola, daughter of the late Eubulo G. Verzola, also a former Acting Presiding Justice of the Court of Appeals, and the late Atty. Cleofe Verzola. They have two daughters.

== Sources ==
This article incorporates text from a free content work. Licensed under public domain as a work of the Philippine government. Text taken from PHILJA In Pursuit of Judicial Excellence, 16, Government of the Republic of the Philippines, Philippine Judicial Academy.
