= Sandiganbayan =

Special appellate collegial court in the Philippines

- Seal of the Sandiganbayan

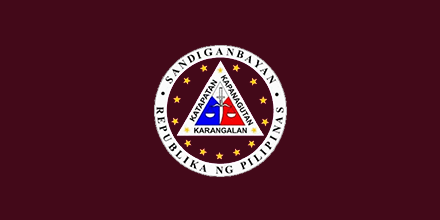
- Flag of the Sandiganbayan
- Jurisdiction: Philippines
- Location: Centennial Building, Commonwealth Avenue, National Government Center, Diliman, Quezon City
- Composition method: Presidential appointment from the shortlist submitted by the Judicial and Bar Council
- Authorized by: Constitution of the Philippines
- Appeals to: Supreme Court of the Philippines
- Appeals from: Regional Trial Court
- Number of positions: 21
- Annual budget: ₱1.37 billion (2020)
- Website: sb.judiciary.gov.ph

Presiding Justice
- Currently: Hon. Geraldine Faith Econg
- Since: January 7, 2025
- Lead position ends: August 6, 2037

Facade in 2023

The Sandiganbayan (lit. 'Support of the nation') is a special appellate collegial court in the Philippines that has jurisdiction over criminal and civil cases involving graft and corrupt practices and other offenses committed by public officers and employees with a salary grade 27 and up, including those in government-owned and controlled corporations. The special court was established by Presidential Decree No. 1486. It was subsequently modified by Presidential Decree No. 1606 and by Republic Acts 7975, 8249 and 10660. It is equal in rank to the Court of Appeals, and consists of fourteen Associate Justices and one Presiding Justice. The Office of the Ombudsman owns exclusive authority to bring cases to the Sandiganbayan.

The Sandiganbayan is housed in the Centennial Building, Commonwealth Avenue, National Government Center, Diliman, Quezon City.

== History ==
Sandiganbayan

The Sandiganbayan was established under the administration of President Ferdinand E. Marcos on June 11, 1978, by Presidential Decree No. 1486 in the 1973 Constitution. The court was equal in rank to the Regional Trial Courts (then known as the Courts of First Instance). On December 10, 1978, Presidential Decree No. 1606 elevated the ranking of the Sandiganbayan to match that of the Court of Appeals, the second-highest judicial court in the Philippines. The Sandiganbayan began operations on February 12, 1979.

Amendments were introduced in Republic Acts No. 7975 and No. 8249, after the EDSA Revolution in 1986, which limited the jurisdiction of the Sandiganbayan to "cases involving public officials occupying positions classified as salary grade 27 and higher."

The Sandiganbayan currently sits in seven divisions of three justices each, as per R.A. No. 10660, amending P.D. No. 1606.

=== Martial law ===
When the Sandiganbayan began operations in 1979, it was composed of only one division (with Hon. Manuel R. Pamaran as Presiding Justice and two Associate Justices) and a 15-membered skeleton crew. In 1981, a second division was launched. A third division was formed on August 4, 1982.

==== Aquino investigation ====
In the wake of the assassination of Benigno Aquino, Jr. in August 1983, Ferdinand Marcos submitted the case for an immediate trial to the Sandiganbayan. Marcos' critics, who included business leaders and church leaders, claimed that the Sandiganbayan had no experience in trying a murder and demanded an appointment of an imperial prosecutor and independent judicial body instead.

In 1984, the 26 people accused in the assassination of Aquino were acquitted by the Sandiganbayan in a 90-page verdict. The verdict disregarded all findings of the Agrava Commission, which was appointed to investigate the assassination.

On June 13, 1985, the Sandiganbayan, with the aid of the commission, threw out the case against General Fabian Ver, the chief of the Armed Forces of the Philippines, together with seven other military men. The Sandiganbayan voted for the exclusion of their testimonies in that they were self-incriminatory and inadmissible as evidence. The Supreme Court upheld this decision by a vote of 10–3 in August. Ver was soon reinstated as chief of staff by Marcos on December 2.

=== Post-martial law ===
==== 1987 Constitution ====
On February 2, 1987, a new constitution was ratified under President Corazon Aquino. The 1987 Constitution dictated the separation of powers and a system of checks and balances between the executive, legislature, and judiciary branches.

The 1987 Constitution expanded the jurisdiction of the Sandiganbayan to include ill-gotten wealth cases investigated by the Presidential Commission on Good Government (PCGG). In April 1994, Imelda Marcos and three former officials of the Ministry of Human Settlements (MHS) were indicted for the misappropriation of PHP97.9 million in MHS funds in 1985. At the same time, however, the Sandiganbayan dismissed charges against Imelda Marcos in connection with the sale of $125.9 million in Central Bank Treasury notes in the 1980s.

Under the 1987 Philippine Constitution and the Ombudsman Act of 1989, the Office of the Ombudsman independently monitors all three branches of the government for political corruption.

=== Laws on graft and corruption in the Philippines ===
Laws on graft and corruption have been in effect as early as the 1950s, before the creation of the Sandiganbayan. Graft and corruption laws govern both public officers and natural persons. The collection of these laws is overseen by the Office of the Ombudsman.

==== Republic Act Nos. 3019 and 1379 ====
The Anti-Graft and Corrupt Practices Act is a law that stipulates that the Philippine Government shall repress certain acts of both public officers and the natural persons that may constitute graft or corruption. Acts that are subject under these laws include graft, divulging otherwise private information, negligence in warranted requests, undue injury by a public officer to any party – private or government – in the form of unwarranted benefits or disadvantages.

In the case of unexplained accrual of wealth, R.A. No. 1379 states that a petition may be filed against any public officer who has acquired property unlawfully, be it through graft or any form of corruption. This petition should come from the Solicitor General of the Republic of the Philippines as per complaint by a taxpayer.

==== Republic Act No. 7080 ====
Any public officer who amasses a certain amount of ill-gotten wealth (at least fifty-million pesos) through means of criminal acts – be it by himself or in connivance with other, shall be subject to reclusion perpetua, a form of imprisonment for life. Any accomplice shall be sentenced with the same.

==== Republic Act. No. 9184 ====
Under the Government Procurement Reform Act, public officers who commits any of the following who colludes with private individuals performs the following illegal acts in RA 9184 will suffer an imprisonment of not less than six years and one day, but not more than fifteen years.

=== Sandiganbayan Building II ===
In October 2024, CJ Alexander Gesmundo led the groundbreaking for the 13-storey Sandiganbayan Building II. The green building will rise on a 2,588-square meter property adjacent to the Sandiganbayan Centennial Building. Designed by the University of the Philippines College of Engineering, the Building Research Services with the National Engineering Center is responsible for the preparation of the Detailed Architectural and Engineering Design.

== Jurisdiction ==
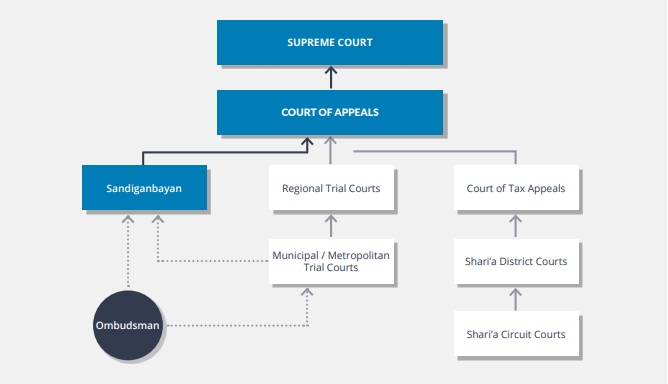
Position of the Sandiganbayan in the Philippine judicial system as presented by the Department of Budget and Management.

To determine whether the Sandiganbayan has jurisdiction, lawyers look into two criteria, namely: the nature of the offense and the salary grade of the public official.

The Sandiganbayan shall have original exclusive jurisdiction over:

- Violation of Anti-graft and Corrupt Practices Law (RA 3019)
- Forfeitures of Illegally Acquired Wealth (RA 1379)
- Crimes committed by public officers namely
  - Direct, Indirect and Qualified Bribery
  - Corruption of public officials
- Other offenses or felonies whether simple or complexed with other crimes committed in relation to their office by public officials.
- Civil and Criminal Cases filed pursuant to and in connection with Executive Orders 1, 2, 14 & 14-A issued in 1986
- Petitions for issuance of Writ of mandamus, prohibition, certiorari, habeas corpus, injunction and other ancillary writs and processes in aid of its appellate jurisdiction; Provided, jurisdiction is not exclusive of the Supreme Court.
- Petitions for Quo Warranto arising or that may arise in cases filed or that may be filed under EO 1, 2, 14 & 14- A

Provided that the accused belongs to a salary grade of 27 or higher, the Sandiganbayan has jurisdiction over:

- Violation of Code of Conduct and Ethical Standards (RA 6713)
- Violation of the Plunder Law (RA 7080)
- Violation of The Heinous Crime Law (RA 7659)
- Violation of The Anti-Money Laundering Law when committed by a public officer (RA 9160)
- Presidential Decree 46 referred to as the gift-giving decree which makes it punishable for any official or employee to receive directly or indirectly and for the private person to give or offer to give any gift, present or other valuable thing on any occasion including Christmas, when such gift, present or valuable thing is given by reason of his official position, regardless of whether or not the same is for past favors or the giver hopes or expects to receive a favor or better treatment in the future from the public official or employee concerned in the discharge of his official functions.
  - Included within the prohibition is the throwing of parties or entertainment in honor of the official or employee or his immediate relatives.
- Presidential Decree 749 which grants immunity from prosecution to any person who voluntarily gives information about any violation of Art.210, 211 or 212 of the RPC, RA 3019, Sec.345 of the NIRC, Sec. 3604 of the Customs and Tariff Code and other provisions of the said Codes penalizing abuse or dishonesty on the part of the public officials concerned and other laws, rules and regulations penalizing graft, corruption and other forms of official abuse and who willingly testifies against the public official or employee subject to certain conditions.

Private individuals can also be sued in cases before the Sandiganbayan if they are alleged to be in conspiracy with the public officer.

The Sandiganbayan is vested with appellate jurisdiction over final judgments, resolutions or orders of the Regional Trial Court whether in the exercise of their original or appellate jurisdiction over crimes and civil cases falling within the original exclusive jurisdiction of the Sandiganbayan but which were committed by public officers below Salary Grade 27.

== Composition ==
The Sandiganbayan has a total of fifteen departments (two head offices, twelve divisions, and one Legal Research and Technical Staff) and a total of 385 authorized positions. 335 of 385 of these positions are filled.

=== Electoral procedure ===
According to the Presidential Decree No. 1606, Section 1, the Presiding Justice and all Associate Justices shall be appointed by the president, as amended by Republic Act 8249.

Appointment of the Court Officials and other employees, however, is not dependent on the president. According to Rule II, Section 7 of the Revised Internal Rules of the Sandiganbayan, "The Supreme Court shall appoint the Clerk of Court, the Division Clerks of Court and all other personnel of the Sandiganbayan upon recommendation of the Sandiganbayan en banc chosen from a list of qualified applicants prepared in accordance with the Civil Service Law, rules and regulations."

==== Qualifications ====
Presidential Decree No. 1606 further states that "No person shall be appointed Presiding Justice or Associate Justice of the Sandiganbayan; unless he is natural-born citizen of the Philippines, at least 40 years of age and for at least ten years has been a judge of a court of record or been engaged in the practice of law in the Philippines or has held office requiring admission to the bar as a pre-requisite for a like period.

=== Justices ===
==== Division and roles ====
The Sandiganbayan originally had three divisions that assisted the Office of the Presiding Justice, according to the Article XIII of the 1973 Constitution. The number of divisions was raised to five divisions in 1995. In 2015, through the Republic Act 10660, under the Aquino Administration, the number of divisions was expanded to seven divisions. Currently, the Sandiganbayan has Office of the Presiding Justice, Office of the Clerk of Court, Legal Research and Technical Staff, seven divisions (Office of the Deputy Clerk of Court), and five other divisions namely Judicial Records Division, Administrative Division, Budget and Finance Division, Management Information System Division, Security and Sheriff Services Division. The functions and roles of these offices and divisions are:

- Office of the Presiding Justice – Enjoy precedence over the other members of the Sandiganbayan in all official functions; implements the policies, executes the resolutions and enforces the orders of the Court en banc; performs the functions specifically vested upon him by law, rules and regulations or those implied therefrom; performs all other functions and duties inherent in his position.
- Office of the Clerk of Court – The Clerk of Court is the administrative officer of the Sandiganbayan. He shall discharge his functions under the control and supervision of the Sandiganbayan en banc through the Presiding Justice. As administrative officer, he shall take direct charge of the administrative operations of the Sandiganbayan and exercise general supervision over its subordinate officials and employees except those belonging to the staff of the Presiding Justice and the Associate Justices. He shall assist the Presiding Justice in the formulation of programs and policies for consideration and action of the Sandiganbayan en banc. The Clerk of Court shall act as its secretariat and prepare its agenda, minutes of meetings and resolutions.
- Legal Research and Technical Staff – Provides legal and technical assistance to the Court by conducting legal research and studies; takes charge of all legal and related matters.
- Office of the Deputy Clerk of Court (seven divisions) – Assists the Clerk of Court in providing technical and administrative support and assistance to their particular Division of the Court; takes charge of the pre and post adjudicative matters relative to cases assigned to the First Division.
- Judicial Records Division – Takes charge of docketing of cases; plans, implements and evaluates programs for the systematic management of judicial records; and performs other related functions. Prepares entries of judgment; issues copies of decisions, resolutions and orders; maintains a systematic filing and records keeping; and handles the Court's information system, monitoring requests for statistical data.
- Administrative Division – Attends to the manpower development and service needs of the Court; and performs all functions relative to administrative and personnel matters. Attends to the procurement and maintenance of the properties, supplies and equipment of the Court, including the Court's physical plant Takes charge of the collection and disbursement of the Court.
- Budget and Finance Division – Prepares and executes the budget of the Court; initiates plans and formula for more effective utilization of funds allotted to the Court; fiscalizes the agency's financial interest including disclosure of deficiencies in control needing corrections. Keeps accounting records for the Court; prepares reports required by the Department of Budget and Management, Commission on Audit and other government agencies.
- Management Information System Division – Provides technical services related to the planning, development, implementation and maintenance of information systems; takes care of all information and communications technology requirements of the Court.
- Security and Sheriff Services Division – In charge of the formulation of plans, implements and evaluates program for the systematic management of security of the Sandiganbayan premises, property and personnel and performs other related functions; takes charge of the formulation of systems for the effective services of Court processes and enforcement of Writs issued by the various Divisions of the Court; serves as liaison office with the various law enforcement agencies and the media regarding all court orders and processes issued by the various divisions of the Court, and other court related matters; takes custody of all accused processing their bail for their temporary liberty and/or to turn-over accused who voluntarily surrenders to the authorized detention centers; oversee that all judicial and extrajudicial proceedings are accomplished; takes charge of the formulation of effective management and implementation of all kinds of court orders or processes and writs coming from the various divisions of the Court.

== Cases ==
=== Procedures ===
The Sandiganbayan holds regular sessions in its principal office in Metro Manila. Sessions may be held outside of Metro Manila when authorized by the Presiding Justice. Cases are heard either en banc or more commonly, by divisions.

Cases are distributed among the divisions through a raffle system. The assignment of a case to a division is permanent, regardless of changes in constitution. Justices may inhibit (i.e., recuse) themselves from a case if they served as Ponente, the Member to whom the Court, after its deliberation on the merits of a case, assigns the writing of its decision or resolution in the case. in the appealed decision of the lower court, or if they or their family members are personally related with the case, or for any other compelling reason. In case of inhibition (recusal) or disqualification, the case will remain with the same division, but the recused justice will be replaced.

Cases may reach the Sandiganbayan either through an appeal from a Regional Trial Court or by original petition filed with the Sandiganbayan. After a case is raffled to a Division, the accused party must be arraigned within thirty days. A pre-trial conference is then held to reach an agreement and issue a pre-trial order. The case is then taken to trial. Following the Speedy Trial Act of 1998, no trial may exceed six months from its starting date. However, the act also allows for certain delays that are excluded from the computed time of trial, including delays caused by other related proceedings involving the accused, absence of the accused or essential witness, and mental or physical incompetence of the accused to stand trial.

=== Adjudication ===
Cases are deemed submitted for decision after the last brief, pleading, or memorandum is filed, or after the deadline for doing so has passed. All adjudicatory action is exercised through the divisions of the Sandiganbayan. The rendition of judgment or final order is based on the unanimous vote of the three Justices in the deciding division. When the Sandiganbayan sits en banc to resolve motions and other incidents, at least eight justices must vote in order to adopt a resolution.

In a joint trial involving multiple cases, a joint or separate judgment may be rendered by the division. In cases involving multiple accused, the division may also render judgment for one or more of the accused by a unanimous vote.

If a unanimous vote cannot be reached in any case, a special division of five will be formed to decide the case by majority vote. Promulgation is done by reading the judgment aloud with the accused present along with any Justice from the deciding division. Decisions are published in the Official Gazette or the official website of the Sandiganbayan.

==== Appeals ====
In general, a party sentenced to any penalty lower than death, life imprisonment, or reclusion perpetua may appeal by filing a motion for reconsideration or a motion for new trial within fifteen days of promulgation of judgment. If a new trial is granted, the previous judgment will be overruled and the new judgment rendered. New trials must also not exceed six months in duration, albeit allowing for certain delays as specified in the Speedy Trial Act. For civil cases, the accused party may file for a petition for a writ of certiorari with the Supreme Court. If the party files an appeal to the Supreme Court, any motion of reconsideration filed to the Sandiganbayan will be deemed abandoned.

If the accused party wishes to appeal from a sentence of life imprisonment or reclusion perpetua, a notice of appeal is filed with the Sandiganbayan and presented to the adverse party. In cases where the Sandiganbayan sentences the accused to death penalty, an automatic appeal follows where the Supreme Court will conduct a review of judgment before the final decision is rendered.

=== Notable cases ===
==== Jinggoy Estrada vs. Sandiganbayan ====
In June 2014, plunder charges against former Philippine senator Jinggoy Estrada and several other members of Congress allegedly involved in the pork barrel scam run by Janet Lim-Napoles were filed by the Ombudsman before the Sandiganbayan. Estrada was accused of plundering ₱183 million from the Priority Development Assistance Fund.

===== Withdrawal of justices =====
In December 2014, all three justices of the Sandiganbayan Fifth Division (Associate Justices Roland Jurado, Alexander Gesmundo and Ma. Theresa Gómez-Estoesta) assigned to the case against Estrada recused themselves from the case for "personal reasons". This marked the first time in the court's history that an entire division withdrew from hearing a case. Though the justices refused to elaborate on their reasons for recusal, the withdrawal was said to have been due to "pressure" from the public to deny Estrada's petition for bail.

==== Imelda Marcos vs. Sandiganbayan ====
In 1991, ten counts of graft were filed against former first lady Imelda Marcos before the Sandiganbayan. Marcos was accused of creating private Swiss foundations during her time as governor of Metro Manila, between 1978 and 1984. She was also accused of violating the Anti-Graft and Corrupt Practices Act by holding financial interests in multiple private enterprises. The government has since uncovered Marcos Swiss deposits amounting to $658 million.

Another corruption case against Marcos involving "unlawfully acquired" art collections amounting to $24 million has been brought to the Sandiganbayan by appeals from the Presidential Commission on Good Government and the Office of the Solicitor General. The case is being handled by the Special First Division of the Sandiganbayan.

===== Delays in court proceedings =====
The case against Imelda Marcos has been ongoing for over 26 years due to multiple causes of delay in court proceedings. In 2017, Marcos was absent from what was scheduled to be her last day of trial for the graft case. In the same year, the trial was reset by the Fifth Division due to the failure of the defense to present their last evidence in the case.

== Membership ==
=== Incumbent justices ===
The Sandiganbayan consists of a Presiding justice and twenty associate justices. Among the current members of the Court, Sarah Jane Fernandez is the longest-serving justice, with a tenure of 4,203 days (11 years, 185 days) as of November 6, 2026; the most recent justices to enter the court are Ronald O. Chua, whose tenures began on August 3, 2026.
Number of Incumbent Justices ▲ by 1 (appointment of Ronald O. Chia as Associate Justice on Aug 3, 2026)

Office	Justice (Date of Birth)	Date Appointed	Appointed by	Date of Retirement (70 years old)	Previous Position or Office (most recent prior to appointment)	Replacing
Presiding Justice	Geraldine Faith Abracia Econg; August 6, 1967 (age 59)	Jan 7, 2025	Marcos, Jr.	Aug 6, 2037	Associate Justice of the Sandiganbayan	Cabotaje-Tang
Senior Associate Justice	Sarah Jane Fernandez; May 14, 1969 (age 57)	May 5, 2015	Aquino III	May 14, 2039	Assistant Solicitor General, Office of the Solicitor General (OSG)	Ong
Associate Justice	Michael Frederick Musñgi; April 14, 1965 (age 61)	Jan 20, 2016	Aquino III	Apr 14, 2035	Presiding Judge, Regional Trial Court (RTC), Branch 17, Malolos, Bulacan (2005-2015)	New Seat
Associate Justice	Maria Theresa V. Mendoza-Arcega; December 18, 1965 (age 60)	Jan 20, 2016	Aquino III	Dec 18, 2035	Presiding Judge, Regional Trial Court (RTC), Branch 17, Malolos, Bulacan (2006-2016)	New Seat
Associate Justice	Karl B. Miranda; October 9, 1957 (age 69)	Jan 20, 2016	Aquino III	Oct 9, 2027	Assistant Solicitor General, Office of the Solicitor General (OSG) (2006-2016)	New Seat
Associate Justice	Zaldy V. Trespreses; December 30, 1972 (age 53)	Jan 20, 2016	Aquino III	Dec 30, 2042	Judicial Staff Head & Protocol Officer, Office of the Chief Justice (2010-2016)	New Seat
Associate Justice	Lorifel Lacap-Pahimna; February 10, 1961 (age 65)	Mar 1, 2017	Duterte	Feb 10, 2031	Executive Judge, Regional Trial Court (RTC), Taguig City (2011-2017)	Inoturan
Associate Justice	Edgardo M. Caldona; February 12, 1970 (age 56)	Mar 10, 2017	Duterte	Feb 12, 2040	Senior Court Attorney, Supreme Court of the Philippines (2010-2017)	Hernandez
Associate Justice	Bayani H. Jacinto; April 30, 1969 (age 57)	May 29, 2017	Duterte	Apr 30, 2039	Director IV, Prosecution, Investigation and Subpoena Bureau – Office of the Ombudsman (2007–2017)	Jurado
Associate Justice	Maryann E. Corpus-Mañalac; July 27, 1966 (age 60)	Dec 8, 2017	Duterte	Jul 27, 2036	Presiding Judge, Regional Trial Court (RTC) of Makati City, Branch 141 (2013–2017)	Cornejo
Associate Justice	Kevin Narce B. Vivero; January 2, 1960 (age 66)	Nov 28, 2017	Duterte	Jan 2, 2030	Presiding Judge, Regional Trial Court (RTC) of Antipolo City, Branch 71 (2005–2017)	Martires
Associate Justice	Georgina Dumpit-Hidalgo; April 14, 1964 (age 62)	Jan 18, 2018	Duterte	Apr 14, 2034	Presiding Judge, Regional Trial Court (RTC) of Caloocan City, Branch 122 (2011–2018)	Ponferrada
Associate Justice	Ronald Bautista Moreno; January 23, 1970 (age 56)	Jun 8, 2018	Duterte	Jan 23, 2040	Presiding Judge, Regional Trial Court (RTC) of Makati City, Branch 147 (2012–2018)	Gesmundo
Associate Justice	Arthur Oliveros Malabaguio; January 10, 1965 (age 61)	Mar 4, 2022	Duterte	Jan 10, 2035	Assistant Government Corporate Counsel, Office of the Government Corporate Counsel (2015–2022)	Cruz
Associate Justice	Juliet Marquez Manalo-San Gaspar; July 2, 1971 (age 55)	Sep 26, 2023	Marcos Jr.	Jul 2, 2041	Presiding Judge, Regional Trial Court (RTC) of Quezon City, Branch 216 (2014–2023)	Quiroz
Associate Justice	J. Ermin Ernest Louie Ramirez Miguel; January 22, 1971 (age 55)	Oct 8, 2024	Marcos Jr.	Jan 22, 2041	Presiding Judge, Regional Trial Court (RTC) of Mandaluyong City, Branch 214 (2015–2024)	Herrera Jr.
Associate Justice	Gener Malalian Gito; July 17, 1971 (age 55)	Oct 8, 2024	Marcos Jr.	Jul 17, 2041	Presiding Judge, Regional Trial Court (RTC) of Manila, Branch 14 (2020–2024)	de la Cruz
Associate Justice	Lord Apalisoc Villanueva; June 9, 1975 (age 51)	Jan 30, 2025	Marcos Jr.	Jun 9, 2045	Undersecretary for Operations, Department of the Interior and Local Government (2022–2025)	Lagos
Associate Justice	Hans Chester Nocom; March 18, 1983 (age 43)	Sep 23, 2025	Marcos Jr.	Mar 18, 2053	Senior Assistant City Prosecutor, Office of the City Prosecutor of Manila (2021–2025)	B. Fernandez
Associate Justice	Fritz Bryn Anthony Delos Santos; May 13, 1985 (age 41)	Sep 23, 2025	Marcos Jr.	May 13, 2055	Court Attorney VI, Supreme Court (2017–2025)	Econg
Associate Justice	Ronald O. Chua; January 19, 1984 (age 42)	Aug 3, 2026	Marcos Jr.	Jan 19, 2054	Deputy Secretary for External Affairs and Relations, Commission on Appointments (2013–2026)	Gomez-Estoesta

=== Divisions ===
Post	First Division	Second Division	Third Division	Fourth Division
Chairperson	M. Mendoza-Arcega	G. Econg; Presiding Justice	K. Miranda	M. Musñgi
Members	B. Jacinto; J. Manalo-San Gaspar	E. Caldona; R. Chua	R. Moreno; F. Delos Santos	A. Malabaguio; J. Miguel
Post	Fifth Division	Sixth Division	Seventh Division	
Chairperson	Z. Trespreses	S. Fernandez (Senior Associate Justice)	L. Pahimna	
Members	M. Corpus-Mañalac; G. Gito	K. Vivero; L. Villanueva	G. Hidalgo; H. Nocom	

=== Membership Timeline (Econg Court) ===
Note: The vertical Blue line denotes "now" (November 6, 2026).

Bar key:
Aquino III appointee Duterte appointee Marcos Jr. appointee

== Demographics ==
=== By appointing President ===
President	Total (Percentage)	Justices
Aquino III	6 (28.57%)	G. Econg Presiding Justice; S. Fernandez Senior Associate Justice; M. Mendoza-Arcega; K. Miranda; M. Musñgi; Z. Trespeses
Duterte	8 (38.1%)	E. Caldona; M. Corpus-Mañalac; G. Hidalgo; B. Jacinto; L. Lacap-Pahimna; A. Malabaguio; R. Moreno; K. Vivero
Bongbong Marcos	6 (33.33%)	J. Manalo-San Gaspar; J. Miguel; G. Gito; L. Villanueva; H. Nocom; F. Delos Santos; R. Chua
Vacant		0 (0%)

=== By gender ===
Gender	Total (Percentage)	Justices
Male	15 (66.67%)	C. Caldona; R. Chua; F. Delos Santos; G. Gito; B. Jacinto; A. Malabaguio; J. Miguel; K. Miranda; R. Moreno; M. Musñgi; H. Nocom; Z. Trespeses; L. Villanueva; K. Viviero
Female	7 (33.33%)	M. Corpus-Mañalac; G. Econg Presiding Justice; S. Fernandez Senior Associate Justice; G. Hidalgo; L. Lacap-Pahimna; J. Manalo-San Gaspar; M. Mendoza-Arcega
Vacant		0 (0%)

=== By Tenure ===
Retirement year	Total (Percentage)	Justices
2027	1 (4.76%)	K. Miranda
2030	1 (4.76%)	K. Vivero
2031	1 (4.76%)	L. Pahimna
2034	1 (4.76%)	G. Hidalgo
2035	3 (14.29%)	A. Malabaguio; M. Musñgi; M. Mendoza-Arcega
2036	1 (4.76%)	M. Corpus-Mañalac
2037	1 (9.52%)	G. Econg (Presiding Justice)
2039	2 (9.52%)	B. Jacinto; S. Fernandez Senior Associate Justice
2040	2 (9.52%)	R. Moreno; E. Caldona
2041	3 (14.29%)	J. Miguel; J. Manalo-San Gaspar; G. Gito
2041	1 (4.76%)	Z. Trespreses
2045	1 (4.76%)	L. Villanueva
2053	1 (4.76%)	H. Nocom
2054	1 (4.76%)	R. Chua
2055	1 (4.76%)	F. Delos Santos
Vacant		0 (0%)

== List of presiding justices ==
No.	Portrait	Name (birth–death)	Tenure start	Tenure end	Tenure length	Appointed by
1		Manuel Pamaran (1926–2020)	December 1, 1978	March 31, 1986	7 years, 120 days	Ferdinand Marcos
2		Francis Garchitorena (1938–2005)	April 18, 1986	January 16, 2002	15 years, 273 days	Corazon Aquino
3		Minita Chico-Nazario (1939–2022)	February 26, 2003	February 10, 2004 (Note: Appointed as Associate Justice of the Supreme Court of the Philippines.)	349 days	Gloria Macapagal Arroyo
4		Teresita de Castro (born 1948)	December 15, 2004	December 3, 2007	2 years, 353 days	Gloria Macapagal Arroyo
5		Diosdado Peralta (born 1952)	March 28, 2008	January 13, 2009	291 days	Gloria Macapagal Arroyo
6		Maria Cristina Cortez-Estrada	July 2, 2009	November 30, 2009	151 days	Gloria Macapagal Arroyo
7		Norberto Geraldez (1949–2010)	February 28, 2010	April 4, 2010 (Note: Died in office.)	35 days	Gloria Macapagal Arroyo
8		Edilberto Sandoval (born 1941)	September 17, 2010	October 4, 2011	1 year, 17 days	Benigno Aquino III
9		Francisco Villaruz Jr. (born 1943)	October 5, 2011	June 8, 2013	1 year, 246 days	Benigno Aquino III
10		Amparo Cabotaje-Tang (born 1954)	October 7, 2013	November 8, 2024	11 years, 32 days	Benigno Aquino III
11		Geraldine Econg (born 1967)	January 7, 2025	Incumbent	1 year, 303 days	Bongbong Marcos

The following served as acting presiding justice in their capacity as senior associate justice.

- Romeo Escareal (March 31 – April 18, 1986)
- Minita Chico-Nazario (January 16, 2002 – February 26, 2003)
- Edilberto Sandoval (February 10 – December 15, 2004, December 3, 2007 – March 28, 2008, November 30, 2009 – February 28, 2010, and April 4 – September 17, 2010)
- Gregory S. Ong (October 4–5, 2011, and June 8 – October 7, 2013)
- Rafael Lagos (November 8 – December 22, 2024)
- Maria Theresa Dolores Gomez-Estoesta (December 22, 2024 – January 7, 2025)

== List of associate justices ==
No.	Name	Succeeded	Tenure start	Tenure end	Tenure length	Appointed by
1	Bernando Fernandez	—	December 10, 1978	June 11, 1981	2 years, 183 days	Ferdinand Marcos
2	Romeo Escareal	—	December 10, 1978	March 5, 1996	17 years, 86 days	Ferdinand Marcos
3	Buenaventura Guerrero	—	December 8, 1980	May 16, 1986	5 years, 159 days	Ferdinand Marcos
4	Conrado Molina	—	December 8, 1980	July 18, 1992	11 years, 223 days	Ferdinand Marcos
5	Moises Kallos	—	December 8, 1980	December 15, 1983	3 years, 7 days	Ferdinand Marcos
6	Ramon Jabson	B. P. Fernandez	November 20, 1981	May 18, 1988	6 years, 180 days	Ferdinand Marcos
7	Francisco Consolacion	—	August 4, 1982	March 10, 1984	1 year, 250 days	Ferdinand Marcos
8	Fidel Purisima	—	August 4, 1982	March 10, 1984	1 year, 250 days	Ferdinand Marcos
9	Romulo Quimbo	—	August 4, 1982	May 16, 1986	3 years, 285 days	Ferdinand Marcos
10	Augusto Amores	Kallos	October 7, 1984	July 5, 1995	10 years, 271 days	Ferdinand Marcos
11	Amante Alconcel	Purisima	October 7, 1984	May 16, 1986	1 year, 221 days	Ferdinand Marcos
12	Bienvenido Vera Cruz	Consolacion	October 7, 1984	May 16, 1986	1 year, 221 days	Ferdinand Marcos
13	Regino C. Hermosisima Jr.	—	May 16, 1986	July 18, 1995	9 years, 63 days	Corazon Aquino
14	Luciano Joson	—	May 21, 1986	January 3, 1990	3 years, 227 days	Corazon Aquino
15	Cipriano del Rosario	—	May 22, 1986	March 15, 2001	14 years, 297 days	Corazon Aquino
16	Jose Balajadia	—	May 30, 1986	February 14, 1998	11 years, 260 days	Corazon Aquino
17	Nathanael Grospe	Jabson	December 2, 1988	January 16, 1993	4 years, 45 days	Corazon Aquino
18	Sabino de Leon Jr.	Joson	March 13, 1990	October 11, 1999	9 years, 212 days	Corazon Aquino
19	Narciso Atienza	Molina	September 14, 1992	December 17, 1993	1 year, 94 days	Fidel V. Ramos
20	Minita Chico-Nazario	Gorospe	May 10, 1993	February 28, 2003 (Note: Appointed as Presiding Justice of the Sandiganbayan.)	9 years, 294 days	Fidel V. Ramos
21	Roberto Lagman	Atienza	November 28, 1994	February 14, 1998	3 years, 78 days	Fidel V. Ramos
22	Harriet Demetriou	Amores	August 28, 1995	February 14, 1998	2 years, 170 days	Fidel V. Ramos
23	Edilberto Sandoval	Hermosisima	March 11, 1996	September 17, 2010	14 years, 190 days	Fidel V. Ramos
24	Leonardo Cruz	Escareal	March 11, 1996	October 5, 1998	2 years, 208 days	Fidel V. Ramos
25	Teresita de Castro	—	September 8, 1997	December 15, 2004	7 years, 98 days	Fidel V. Ramos
26	Anacleto Badoy Jr.	—	September 8, 1997	October 19, 2002	5 years, 41 days	Fidel V. Ramos
27	German Lee Jr.	—	September 8, 1997	September 18, 1998	1 year, 10 days	Fidel V. Ramos
28	Godofredo Legaspi	—	September 8, 1997	November 8, 2007	10 years, 61 days	Fidel V. Ramos
29	Narciso Nario	—	September 8, 1997	October 29, 2002	5 years, 51 days	Fidel V. Ramos
30	Catalino Castañeda Jr.	—	September 8, 1997	September 20, 2002	5 years, 12 days	Fidel V. Ramos
31	Gregory S. Ong	Cruz	October 5, 1998	September 23, 2014 (Note: Gregory S. Ong was dismissed by the Supreme Court on September 23, 2014.)	15 years, 353 days	Joseph Estrada
32	Alfredo Gustillo	Ballajadia	October 5, 1998	September 4, 1999	334 days	Joseph Estrada
33	Ricardo Ilarde	Lagman	October 7, 1998	November 27, 2001	3 years, 51 days	Joseph Estrada
34	Rodolfo Palattao	Demetriou	October 9, 1998	December 14, 2003	5 years, 66 days	Joseph Estrada
35	Maria Cristina Cortez-Estrada	Lee	October 19, 1998	July 2, 2009	10 years, 256 days	Joseph Estrada
36	Raoul Victorino	Gustillo	January 31, 2000	February 15, 2005	5 years, 15 days	Joseph Estrada
37	Nicodemo Ferrer	De Leon	January 31, 2000	August 3, 2002	2 years, 184 days	Joseph Estrada
38	Francisco Villaruz Jr.	Ilarde	October 2, 2001	October 5, 2011	10 years, 3 days	Gloria Macapagal Arroyo
39	Diosdado Peralta	Del Rosario	June 14, 2002	March 28, 2008	5 years, 288 days	Gloria Macapagal Arroyo
40	Norberto Geraldez	Nario	January 21, 2003	February 28, 2010	7 years, 38 days	Gloria Macapagal Arroyo
41	Roland Jurado	Castañeda	October 3, 2003	February 1, 2017	13 years, 121 days	Gloria Macapagal Arroyo
42	Efren de la Cruz	Ferrer	October 10, 2003	June 18, 2024	20 years, 252 days	Gloria Macapagal Arroyo
43	Teresita Diaz-Baldos	Badoy	October 17, 2003	July 22, 2016	12 years, 279 days	Gloria Macapagal Arroyo
44	Jose Hernandez	Palattao	March 9, 2004	November 22, 2016	12 years, 258 days	Gloria Macapagal Arroyo
45	Rodolfo Ponferrada	Chico-Nazario	August 23, 2004	September 13, 2017	13 years, 21 days	Gloria Macapagal Arroyo
46	Alexander Gesmundo	De Castro	October 15, 2005	August 14, 2017	11 years, 303 days	Gloria Macapagal Arroyo
47	Samuel Martires	Victorino	October 15, 2005	March 2, 2017	11 years, 138 days	Gloria Macapagal Arroyo
48	Napoleon Inoturan	Legaspi	April 4, 2008	August 1, 2016	8 years, 119 days	Gloria Macapagal Arroyo
49	Alex Quiroz	Peralta	December 5, 2008	July 28, 2022	13 years, 235 days	Gloria Macapagal Arroyo
50	Maria Cristina Cornejo	Cortez-Estrada	May 1, 2010	March 1, 2017	6 years, 304 days	Gloria Macapagal Arroyo
51	Rafael Lagos	Geraldez	December 9, 2010	December 22, 2024	14 years, 13 days	Benigno Aquino III
52	Oscar Herrera Jr.	Sandoval	April 26, 2011	May 23, 2024	13 years, 27 days	Benigno Aquino III
53	Amparo Cabotaje-Tang	Villaruz	June 11, 2012	October 1, 2013	1 year, 112 days	Benigno Aquino III
54	Maria Theresa Dolores Gomez-Estoesta	Cabotaje-Tang	June 20, 2014	September 1, 2025 (Note: Appointed as Court Administrator of the Supreme Court of the Philippines.)	11 years, 73 days	Benigno Aquino III
55	Sarah Jane Fernandez	Ong	May 5, 2015	Incumbent	11 years, 185 days	Benigno Aquino III
56	Michael Frederick Musñgi	—	January 20, 2016	Incumbent	10 years, 290 days	Benigno Aquino III
57	Reynaldo Cruz	—	January 20, 2016	February 21, 2020	4 years, 32 days	Benigno Aquino III
58	Geraldine Econg	—	January 20, 2016	January 7, 2025	8 years, 353 days	Benigno Aquino III
59	Maria Theresa Mendoza-Arcega	—	January 20, 2016	Incumbent	10 years, 290 days	Benigno Aquino III
60	Karl Miranda	—	January 20, 2016	Incumbent	10 years, 290 days	Benigno Aquino III
61	Zaldy Trespeses	—	January 20, 2016	Incumbent	10 years, 290 days	Benigno Aquino III
62	Bernelito Fernandez	Diaz-Baldos	October 28, 2016	June 9, 2025	8 years, 224 days	Rodrigo Duterte
63	Lorifel Lacap-Pahimna	Inoturan	March 1, 2017	Incumbent	9 years, 250 days	Rodrigo Duterte
64	Edgardo Caldona	Hernandez	March 10, 2017	Incumbent	9 years, 241 days	Rodrigo Duterte
65	Bayani Jacinto	Jurado	May 29, 2017	Incumbent	9 years, 161 days	Rodrigo Duterte
66	Kevin Narce Vivero	Martires	November 28, 2017	Incumbent	8 years, 343 days	Rodrigo Duterte
67	Maryann Corpus-Mañalac	Cornejo	December 8, 2017	Incumbent	8 years, 333 days	Rodrigo Duterte
68	Georgina Hidalgo	Ponferrada	January 18, 2018	Incumbent	8 years, 292 days	Rodrigo Duterte
69	Ronald Moreno	Gesmundo	June 8, 2018	Incumbent	8 years, 151 days	Rodrigo Duterte
70	Arthur Malabaguio	Cruz	March 4, 2022	Incumbent	4 years, 247 days	Rodrigo Duterte
71	Juliet Manalo-San Gaspar	Quiroz	September 27, 2023	Incumbent	3 years, 40 days	Bongbong Marcos
72	J. Ermin Ernest Louie Miguel	De la Cruz	October 8, 2024	Incumbent	2 years, 29 days	Bongbong Marcos
73	Gener Gito	Herrera	October 8, 2024	Incumbent	2 years, 29 days	Bongbong Marcos
74	Lord Villanueva	Lagos	January 30, 2025	Incumbent	1 year, 280 days	Bongbong Marcos
75	Hans Christian Nocom	B. R. Fernandez	September 23, 2025	Incumbent	1 year, 44 days	Bongbong Marcos
76	Fritz Bryn Anthony Delos Santos	Econg	September 23, 2025	Incumbent	1 year, 44 days	Bongbong Marcos
77	Ronald Chua	Gomez-Estoesta	Aug 3, 2026	Incumbent	95 days	Bongbong Marcos

== Timeline of Justices by Presiding Justice (1978-present) ==
=== Members of the Pamaran Court (1978-1986) ===
Bar key:
Marcos appointee

==== Members of the Garcitorena Court (1986-2002) ====
Bar key:
Marcos appointee C. Aquino appointee Ramos appointee Estrada appointee Macapagal-Arroyo appointee
note: † - died in office

=== Members of the Chico-Nazario Court (2003–2004) ===
Bar key:
Ramos appointee Estrada appointee Macapagal-Arroyo appointee

=== Members of the de Castro Court (2005-2007) ===
Bar Key:
Ramos appointee Estrada appointee Macapagal-Arroyo appointee

=== Members of the Peralta Court (2008–2009) ===
Bar Key:
Ramos appointee Estrada appointee Macapagal-Arroyo appointee

=== Members of the Cortez-Estrada Court (2009) ===
Bar Key:
Ramos appointee Estrada appointee Macapagal-Arroyo appointee

=== Members of the Geraldez Court (2010) ===
Bar Key:
Ramos appointee Estrada appointee Macapagal-Arroyo appointee

=== Members of the Sandoval Court (2010-2011) ===
Bar Key:
Estrada appointee Macapagal-Arroyo appointee Aquino III appointee

=== During the Presiding Justiceship of Francisco Villaruz Jr. (2011-2013) ===
Bar Key:
Estrada appointee Macapagal-Arroyo appointee Aquino IIII Appointee

=== During the Presiding Justiceship of Amparo M. Cabotaje-Tang (2013-2024) ===
Bar Key:
Estrada appointee Macapagal-Arroyo appointee Aquino III appointee Duterte appointee Marcos Jr. appointee

== The rule of seniority ==
The Associate Justices of the Court are usually ordered according to the date of their appointment. There are no official ramifications as to this ranking, although the order determines the seating arrangement on the bench and is duly considered in all matters of protocol. Within the discretion of the Court, the ranking may also factor into the composition of the divisions of the Court.

The incumbent Justice with the earliest date of appointment is deemed the Senior Associate Justice. The Senior Associate Justice has no constitutional or statutory duties, but usually acts as Acting Presiding Justice during the absence of the Presiding Justice. The Senior Associate Justice is not usually designated as the chairperson of the second division of the Court.

The following became Senior Associate Justices in their tenure in the Sandiganbayan:

No.	Name	Tenure start as Associate Justice	Tenure as Senior Associate Justice	
No.	Name	Tenure start as Associate Justice	Tenure start	Tenure end
1	Bernando Fernandez	December 10, 1978	December 10, 1978	June 11, 1981
2	Romeo Escareal	December 10, 1978	June 11, 1981	March 5, 1996
3	Cipriano del Rosario	May 22, 1986	March 5, 1996	March 15, 2001
4	Minita Chico-Nazario	May 10, 1993	March 15, 2001	February 28, 2003
5	Edilberto Sandoval	March 11, 1996	February 28, 2003	September 17, 2010
6	Gregory S. Ong	October 5, 1998	September 17, 2010	September 23, 2014
7	Roland Jurado	October 3, 2003	September 23, 2014	February 1, 2017
8	Efren de la Cruz	October 10, 2003	February 1, 2017	June 18, 2024
9	Rafael Lagos	December 9, 2010	June 18, 2024	December 22, 2024
10	Maria Theresa Dolores Gomez-Estoesta	June 20, 2014	December 22, 2024	September 1, 2025 (Note: Appointed as Court Administrator of the Supreme Court of the Philippines.)
11	Sarah Jane Fernandez	May 11, 2015	September 1, 2025	Incumbent

== See also ==
- 2011 Armed Forces of the Philippines corruption scandal
- Chief Justice of the Philippines
- Constitution of the Philippines
- Court of Appeals of the Philippines
- Court of Tax Appeals of the Philippines
- Political history of the Philippines
