= Óscar Herrera (footballer) =

Chilean footballer (1959–2015)

Personal information
- Full name: Oscar Enrique Herrera Hernández
- Date of birth: 3 January 1959
- Place of birth: Talcahuano, Chile
- Date of death: 5 October 2015 (aged 56)
- Height: 1.70 m (5 ft 7 in)
- Position: Midfielder

Senior career*
Years	Team	Apps	(Gls)
1980–1988	CD Los Náuticos		
1989	Fernández Vial		

International career
1981–1988	Chile	23	(1)
- * Club domestic league appearances and goals

Oscar Enrique Herrera Hernández (3 January 1959 – 5 October 2015) was a Chilean footballer who played as a midfielder. He made 23 appearances for the Chile national team from 1981 to 1988. He was also part of Chile's squad for the 1983 Copa América tournament.
