= Amparo Cabotaje-Tang =

Filipino jurist, lawyer and Presiding Justice of the Sandiganbayan

The Honorable Amparo Cabotaje-Tang

10th Presiding Justice of the Sandiganbayan
- In office October 7, 2013 – November 8, 2024
- Nominated by: Judicial and Bar Council
- Appointed by: Benigno Aquino III
- Preceded by: Francisco H. Villaruz, Jr. (Presiding Justice); Gregory Ong (acting)
- Succeeded by: Maria Theresa Dolores Gomez-Estoesta (acting); Geraldine Faith Abracia Econg (Presiding Justice)

55th Associate Justice of the Sandiganbayan
- In office June 11, 2012 – October 7, 2012
- Appointed by: Benigno Aquino III
- Preceded by: Francisco Villaruz, Jr.
- Succeeded by: Maria Theresa Dolores Gomez-Estoesta

Personal details
- Born: Amparo Magabung Cabotage; November 8, 1954 (age 71) Cagayan, Philippines
- Education: Manuel L. Quezon University (BA); San Beda College (LLB)

Amparo Cabotaje-Tang (née Magabung; born November 8, 1954) is a Filipino jurist who previously served as the Presiding Justice of the Sandiganbayan, the Philippines' anti-graft court. She was appointed Presiding Justice from October 1, 2013, until her retirement on November 8, 2024.

== Early life and education ==
Cabotaje-Tang was born in Cagayan, Philippines. She earned a degree in Political Science from Manuel L. Quezon University and a law degree from San Beda University. She passed the Philippine Bar Examination in 1980 with a rating of 84.95%.

== Judicial career ==
Cabotaje-Tang began her legal career as a legal assistant at the Supreme Court of the Philippines (1980–1982) and as a trial attorney and later Assistant Solicitor General at the Office of the Solicitor General (1982–2012).

In 2012, she was appointed Associate Justice of the Sandiganbayan. The following year, she was promoted to Presiding Justice. She chairs the Third Division of the Sandiganbayan.

In 2018, Tang was among the 10 shortlisted to replace retiring Associate Justice Noel Tijam. It was her third time to apply for Supreme Court post.

Cabotaje-Tang is a professor of law at San Beda University College of Law and the University of Santo Tomas Faculty of Civil Law, where she teaches Criminal Law and Criminal Law Review.

=== Controversies ===
In December 2018, during her public panel interview before the Judicial and Bar Council (JBC) for the position of Associate Justice of the Supreme Court, Cabotaje-Tang was confronted with a letter-complaint from individuals claiming to be concerned employees of the Sandiganbayan.

The complaint alleged that she engaged in "favoritism" by authorizing a retirement party for a clerk of court and accused her of managing the court similarly to former Chief Justice Maria Lourdes Sereno, who had faced criticism for making unilateral decisions. Cabotaje-Tang denied the accusations, stating that the decision was made collectively by a committee she chaired and in accordance with court rules on retirement ceremonies. She also questioned the authenticity of the letter, noting that the Sandiganbayan Employees' Association had disowned it.

The Supreme Court later dismissed the complaint on July 17, 2018, citing that it was unverified, lacked supporting documents, and that the identity of the purported complainant was in doubt.

=== Retirement ===
On November 7, 2024, Sandiganbayan Presiding Justice Amparo M. Cabotaje-Tang was honored in a Special Sandiganbayan En Banc Session at the Manila Hotel, marking her retirement from the judiciary. Supreme Court Chief Justice Alexander G. Gesmundo paid tribute to Cabotaje-Tang as "a shining example of what it means to serve with integrity, perseverance, and an unwavering commitment to excellence."

== Contributions and recognition ==
She received the Outstanding Alumna Award from San Beda College of Law in 2014 and the Outstanding Woman in Service Award in 2015. She was named one of the Natatanging Cagayano in 2017 and received the Ulirang Ina Award for Law and Judiciary in 2018.

Cabotaje-Tang has served as a bar examiner for Political Law in 2015 and has participated in various international legal forums, including those organized by the United Nations and the Australian Government.
