= Maria Cristina Cornejo =

Filipino lawyer

Associate Justice Maria Cristina Cornejo
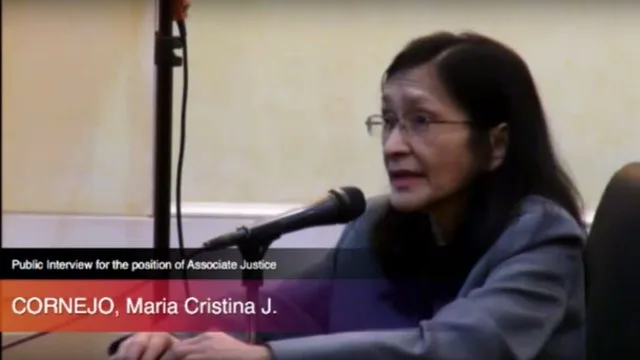

Associate Justice of the Sandiganbayan
- In office May 1, 2010 – March 14, 2017
- Preceded by: Maria Cristina Cortez-Estrada
- Succeeded by: Maryann Corpuz-Manalac

Personal details
- Born: December 13, 1950
- Died: September 3, 2017 (aged 66) San Juan, Metro Manila, Philippines
- Education: University of Santo Tomas (AB, LL.B.)
- Profession: Lawyer, judge, professor

Maria Cristina Cornejo (December 13, 1950 – September 3, 2017) was a Filipino lawyer, professor, and Associate Justice of the Sandiganbayan. She served in the anti-graft court from 2010 until her early retirement in 2017 due to illness.

== Early life and education ==
Cornejo obtained her bachelor's degree in political science in 1971 and her Bachelor of Laws in 1975 from the University of Santo Tomas (UST). She later joined the faculty of the UST Faculty of Civil Law as an associate professor, teaching remedial and criminal law.

== Career ==
Before her appointment to the Sandiganbayan, Cornejo served as the executive judge of the Makati City Regional Trial Court. She also worked as a bar reviewer in remedial and criminal law and was a lecturer for the Mandatory Continuing Legal Education program.

Cornejo was appointed Associate Justice of the Sandiganbayan on May 1, 2010. She was part of the division that acquitted Janet Lim-Napoles of malversation on October 28, 2010, in relation to a contract for Kevlar helmets for the Philippine Marines.

== Awards ==
In 2001, Cornejo received the Supreme Court National Centennial Award for Judicial Excellence. She was later awarded the Lingkod Bayan Award by the Civil Service Commission in 2002.

== Illness and retirement ==
Cornejo was diagnosed with multiple illnesses, including acute cerebrovascular disease, systemic lupus erythematosus, pancytopenia, colon cancer, and acute kidney injury. She went on prolonged sick leave in June 2016. On March 14, 2017, the Supreme Court approved her early retirement with full benefits, even though she was four years short of the mandatory retirement age of 70.

== Death ==
Cornejo died on September 3, 2017, at the Cardinal Santos Medical Center in San Juan, Metro Manila due to multiple organ failure. She was 66 years old. Necrological services were held by the Sandiganbayan, and the Philippine flag was flown at half-staff in her honor.
