= Efren de la Cruz (jurist) =

Filipino jurist

Associate Justice of the Sandiganbayan
- In office October 10, 2003 – June 18, 2024
- Appointed by: Gloria Macapagal Arroyo
- Preceded by: Nicodemo Ferrer
- Succeeded by: J. Ermin Ernest Louie Ramirez

Personal details
- Born: Efren de la Cruz; June 18, 1954 (age 71)
- Occupation: Jurist
- Profession: Lawyer, Judge

Efren de la Cruz (born June 18, 1954) is a retired Filipino jurist who served as an Associate Justice of the Sandiganbayan from 2003 until his mandatory retirement on June 18, 2024. He is known for his long tenure of more than 20 years at the anti-graft court, his strong stance on judicial ethics, and his dissenting opinion in the acquittal of former senator Ramon Revilla Jr. in a plunder case.

== Judicial career ==
De la Cruz was appointed to the Sandiganbayan in 2003 by then President Gloria Macapagal Arroyo. He became known as one of the court’s most hardworking magistrates, consistently maintaining one of the highest case disposition rates.

During his tenure, he became widely respected among his peers, who referred to him as “Mr. Ethics” for his commitment to integrity and his efforts to safeguard the judiciary from undue influence.

=== Major cases ===
In 2013, De la Cruz chaired the Sandiganbayan First Division that denied bail to Arroyo in the plunder case involving the Philippine Charity Sweepstakes Office fund scam. In 2014, he again voted to deny bail in a special division ruling (3–2). However, the Supreme Court of the Philippines acquitted Arroyo in 2016, leading the Sandiganbayan to dismiss the cases against her co-accused.

In December 2018, De la Cruz dissented from the majority decision acquitting Senator Ramon “Bong” Revilla Jr. of plunder charges. In his 141-page dissent, he found Revilla guilty of conspiring with Richard Cambe and Janet Napoles to divert ₱185.4 million in government funds. His view was joined by Justice Ma. Theresa Dolores Gomez-Estoesta, while Justices Geraldine Faith Econg, Edgardo Caldona, and Georgina Hidalgo voted to acquit.

== Retirement ==
De la Cruz reached the mandatory retirement age on June 18, 2024. He was honored in a special en banc session of the Supreme Court of the Philippines led by Chief Justice Alexander Gesmundo. At the time of his retirement, he was the longest-serving Sandiganbayan justice, with nearly 21 years of service.

== See also ==
- Sandiganbayan
- Supreme Court of the Philippines
