= Norberto Geraldez =

Filipino jurist (1949–2010)

Presiding Justice of the Sandiganbayan
- In office 28 February 2010 – 4 April 2010
- Appointed by: Gloria Macapagal-Arroyo
- Preceded by: Maria Cristina Cortez-Estrada
- Succeeded by: Edilberto G. Villaruz Jr. (acting)

42nd Associate Justice of the Sandiganbayan
- In office 21 January 2003 – 28 February 2010
- Appointed by: Gloria Macapagal-Arroyo
- Preceded by: Nario, Sr.
- Succeeded by: Chico-Nazario

Personal details
- Born: Norberto Yatco Getaldez; December 1, 1949
- Died: April 4, 2010 (aged 60) Manila, Philippines
- Spouse: Regina Padilla Geraldez
- Children: Norberto Jr., Agustin, Patricia, Nicanor
- Education: San Beda College (LL.B.)
- Occupation: Judge, Lawyer, Special Prosecutor

Norberto Yatco Geraldez (December 1, 1949 – April 4, 2010) was a Filipino jurist who served as Presiding Justice of the Sandiganbayan, the Philippines' anti-graft court, for a brief period in 2010. Prior to his appointment as Presiding Justice, he served as the 42nd Associate Justice of the Sandiganbayan from 2003 to 2010.

== Early life and education ==
Geraldez obtained his Bachelor of Laws degree from San Beda College in 1977. He was the son of retired Court of Appeals Justice Ambrosio Geraldez and lawyer Herminia Yatco.

== Legal and judicial career ==
He was appointed Associate Justice of the Sandiganbayan on 21 January 2003 by President Gloria Macapagal-Arroyo. On 28 February 2010, he became Presiding Justice of the Sandiganbayan, succeeding Maria Cristina Cortez-Estrada.

== Death ==
Geraldez died at age 60 due to pancreatic cancer. His remains were cremated and brought to the Heritage Memorial in Fort Bonifacio

== See also ==
- Sandiganbayan
- Office of the Ombudsman (Philippines)
