= Alexander Gesmundo =

Former Chief Justice of the Supreme Court of the Philippines

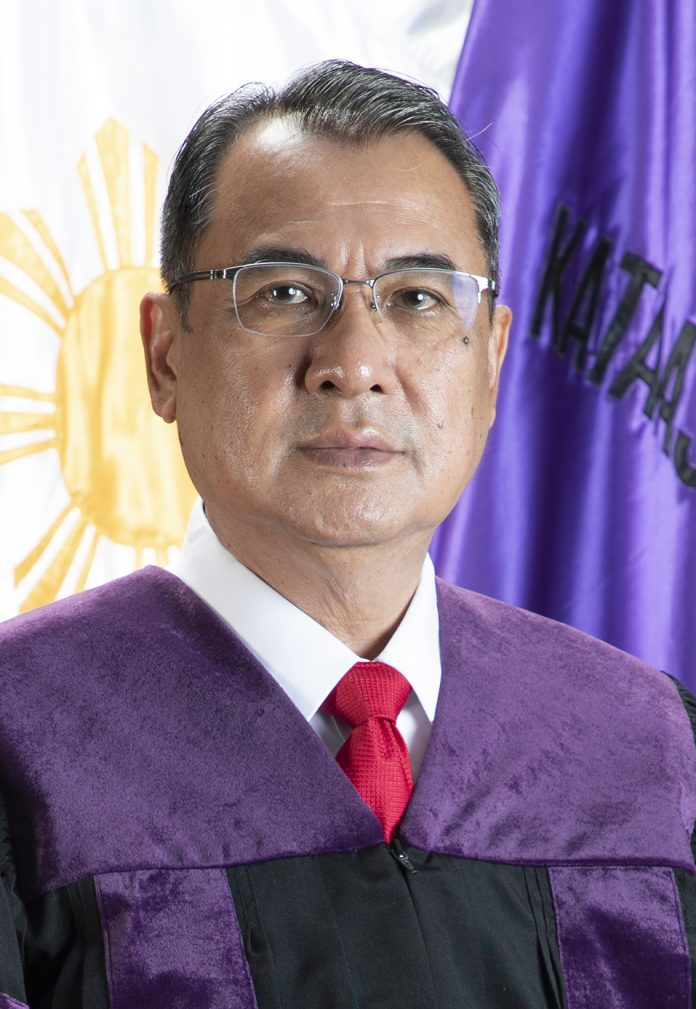
- Official portrait, 2026

27th Chief Justice of the Philippines
- In office April 5, 2021 – November 6, 2026
- Appointed by: Rodrigo Duterte
- Preceded by: Diosdado Peralta
- Succeeded by: Rodil Zalameda

Associate Justice of the Supreme Court of the Philippines
- In office August 14, 2017 – April 5, 2021
- Appointed by: Rodrigo Duterte
- Preceded by: Jose C. Mendoza
- Succeeded by: Japar Dimaampao

Associate Justice of the Sandiganbayan
- In office October 15, 2005 – August 14, 2017
- Appointed by: Gloria Macapagal Arroyo
- Preceded by: Teresita de Castro
- Succeeded by: Ronald Moreno

Personal details
- Born: Alexander Gahon Gesmundo; November 6, 1956 (age 70) San Pablo, Laguna, Philippines
- Education: Lyceum of the Philippines University (BS.Ec); Ateneo de Manila University (LL.B)
- Affiliation: Fraternal Order of Utopia
- Religion: Philippine Independent Church

Alexander Gahon Gesmundo (born November 6, 1956) is a Filipino jurist who served as the 27th chief justice of the Philippines from 2021 to 2026. He previously served as an associate justice of the Supreme Court from 2017 to 2021 and as an associate justice of the Sandiganbayan from 2005 to 2017. He was appointed chief justice by President Rodrigo Duterte on April 5, 2021, succeeding Diosdado Peralta, and served until his mandatory retirement on November 6, 2026. He was succeeded by Rodil Zalameda.

== Education ==
Alexander Gesmundo studied Bachelor of Science in economics at the Lyceum of the Philippines University while he obtained his law degree from the Ateneo de Manila University in 1984 and passed the Philippine bar examinations in April 1985.

== Career ==
He started working as a trial attorney at the Office of the Solicitor General (OSG) in 1985 and was awarded Most Outstanding Solicitor three years later. In August 2002, he was promoted to assistant solicitor general. He continued to serve in the OSG until October 2005.

He was on seconded appointment as commissioner of the Presidential Commission on Good Government from 1998 to 2001.

After 20 years with the OSG, he was then appointed as an associate justice of the Sandiganbayan on October 15, 2005, later as chairperson of its seventh division and co-chairperson of the Committee on Rules.

On August 14, 2017, Gesmundo became the 178th Supreme Court magistrate, assuming the post vacated by Justice Jose C. Mendoza who reached mandatory retirement age. President Rodrigo Duterte appointed Gesmundo as chief justice to succeed Diosdado Peralta, who retired early on March 27, 2021. Gesmundo is the fourth chief justice appointed by Duterte and the third Atenean to assume the post of the high tribunal.

Legal offices
Preceded by Teresita de Castro	Associate Justice of the Sandiganbayan; 2003–2017	Succeeded by Ronald Moreno
Preceded by Jose C. Mendoza	Associate Justice of the Supreme Court; 2017–2021	Succeeded by Japar Dimaampao
Preceded by Diosdado Peralta	Chief Justice of the Supreme Court; 2021–2026	Succeeded by Rodil Zalameda
