= Robert Victor Marcon =

Filipino jurist and Associate Justice of the Court of Appeals

The Honorable Robert Victor Marcon

Associate Justice of the Court of Appeals
- Incumbent
- Assumed office September 23, 2025
- Appointed by: Bongbong Marcos
- Preceded by: Fernanda Lampas-Peralta

Judge of Branch 3, Regional Trial Court, Makati City
- In office March 16, 2018 – September 23, 2025
- Preceded by: Court Created
- Succeeded by: Vacant

Judge of Branch 54, Regional Trial Court, Lucena City
- In office September 13, 2013 – March 16, 2018
- Succeeded by: Eileen Dantes Lim

Personal details
- Born: July 28, 1967 (age 59)
- Education: Arellano University School of Law (LL.B.); Pamantasan ng Lungsod ng Maynila (LL.M.)
- Occupation: Jurist
- Profession: Lawyer

Robert Victor Marcon (born July 28, 1967) is a Filipino lawyer, legal educator, and jurist serving as an Associate Justice of the Court of Appeals since 2025.

== Education ==
Marcon earned his law degree from the San Beda Universityin 1997. He later obtained a Master of Laws degree from Pamantasan ng Lungsod ng Maynila (PLM), where he was awarded Best in Thesis.

He was admitted to the Philippine Bar in 1998.

== Legal career ==
Before joining the judiciary, Marcon engaged in the private practice of law for approximately fifteen years. He also served in government as Attorney III and Special Assistant to the Commissioner of the Bureau of Customs.

== Judicial career ==
In 2013, Marcon was appointed Presiding Judge of Branch 54 of the Regional Trial Court in Lucena City, Quezon, the province's lone family court. He served in the position until 2018.

He was later appointed Judge of Branch 3, Family Court, Regional Trial Court of Makati City, serving from 2018 until his elevation to the appellate court.

== Court of Appeals ==
On September 23, 2025, President Bongbong Marcos appointed Marcon as Associate Justice of the Court of Appeals. He succeeded Associate Justice Fernanda Lampas Peralta, who had earlier been designated as Presiding Justice of the appellate court.

Chief Justice Alexander Gesmundo administered Marcon’s oath of office during ceremonies held at the Supreme Court of the Philippines on November 5, 2025.
