= Loida Posadas-Kahulugan =

Filipino lawyer and retired associate justice of the Court of Appeals of the Philippines

Associate Justice Loida Sales Posadas-Kahulugan
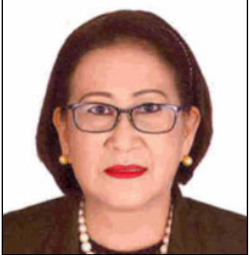

Associate Justice of the Court of Appeals of the Philippines
- In office June 11, 2018 – January 19, 2023
- Preceded by: Socorro Inting
- Succeeded by: Hon. Lorna Francisca Chua-Cheng

Personal details
- Born: Loida Sales Posadas Kalamansig, Sultan Kudarat, Philippines
- Education: Notre Dame University; National College of Business and Arts; Ateneo de Davao College of Law
- Occupation: Judge, Lawyer, CPA

Loida Sales Posadas-Kahulugan is a Filiipino lawyer and a retired Associate Justice of the Court of Appeals of the Philippines. She was appointed to the appellate court on June 11, 2018, and served until January 19, 2023.

== Early life and education ==
Posadas-Kahulugan was born in Kalamansig, Sultan Kudarat to Cornelio Batilo Posadas of Iloilo and Alejandra Dumlao Sales of Ilocos Sur. She finished valedictorian in both elementary and high school in Sultan Kudarat. She earned her Bachelor of Science in Business Administration at Notre Dame University and the National College of Business and Arts, becoming a Certified Public Accountant in 1975.

In 1985, while working full time and raising three children, she pursued law at the Ateneo de Davao College of Law, graduating in 1989. She passed the Bar in 1990 and was admitted in 1991.

== Career ==
Before joining the judiciary, Posadas-Kahulugan worked for 16 years in the private sector as accountant, auditor, and finance officer, and briefly in the Presidential Commission on Good Government (PCGG).

She joined the Office of the Ombudsman for Mindanao in 1989, serving as Administrative Officer, Graft Investigation Officer, and later as Prosecution Officer until 2004.

On March 1, 2004, she was appointed Presiding Judge of the Regional Trial Court Branch 21 in Bansalan, Davao del Sur, where she served until her appointment to the Court of Appeals in 2018.

== Professional affiliations ==
She has been a member of various organizations, including the Philippine Institute of Certified Public Accountants (PICPA), Integrated Bar of the Philippines (IBP), Sigma Tau Mu Sorority, Philippine Judges Association, Philippine Women Judges Association, Davao Lady Lawyers Association, and Toastmasters International.

== Personal life ==
She is the eldest of ten children and the mother of three: Abigail, a nurse based in the United Kingdom; Joecyrnax Jr., a nurse in Davao City; and Auda Bea, a practicing lawyer.
