= Eduardo Peralta, Jr. =

Filipino lawyer, jurist and author (born 1962)

Eduardo B. Peralta Jr.
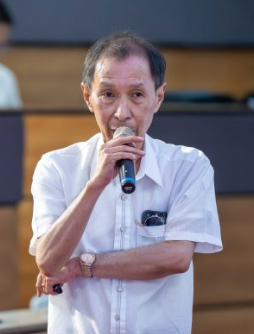

Associate Justice of the Court of Appeals of the Philippines
- Incumbent
- Assumed office February 16, 2010
- Preceded by: Martin Villarama, Jr.

Personal details
- Born: Eduardo Basa Peralta, Jr. September 29, 1962 (age 64) Philippines
- Education: San Beda College of Law
- Occupation: Judge, law professor, author

Eduardo Basa Peralta Jr. (born September 29, 1962) is a Filipino lawyer and jurist currently serving as an Associate Justice of the Court of Appeals of the Philippines since February 16, 2010.

== Judicial career ==
Peralta began his legal career as a staff member for then-Associate Justice Jose Armando R. Melo of the Court of Appeals and later in the Supreme Court. He was appointed as a judge of the Metropolitan Trial Court of Manila at the age of 32 and subsequently served as the First and Second Vice-Executive Judge. He later became the Presiding Judge of Branch 17 and Executive Judge of the Regional Trial Court of Manila.

In 2010, he was appointed to the Court of Appeals.

== Academic career ==
Peralta has taught law at San Beda College and other universities in the Philippines. He was the first graduate of the San Beda Graduate School of Law Masteral program in 2005, earning cum laude honors for his dissertation on the law of evidence.

== Personal life ==
Eduardo Peralta Jr. was born on September 29, 1962.

== See also ==
- Court of Appeals of the Philippines
- San Beda College of Law
