= Court of Appeals of the Philippines =

Appellate court in the Philippines

Court of Appeals
- Hukuman ng Pag-aapela
- Seal of the Court of Appeals

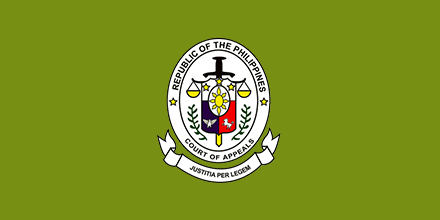
- Flag of the Court of Appeals of the Philippines
- Established: February 1, 1936
- Jurisdiction: Philippines
- Location: Manila, Cebu City, and Cagayan de Oro
- Composition method: Presidential appointment from the short-list submitted by the Judicial and Bar Council
- Authorized by: Commonwealth Act No. 3, Batas Pambansa Blg. 129, Republic Act No. 7902, Republic Act No. 8246, Republic Act No. 9160, Republic Act No. 9372
- Appeals to: Supreme Court of the Philippines
- Appeals from: Regional trial courts
- Number of positions: 69
- Annual budget: ₱3.09 billion (2020)
- Website: ca.judiciary.gov.ph

Presiding Justice
- Currently: Fernanda Lampas-Peralta
- Since: November 18, 2024

The Court of Appeals (Filipino: Hukuman ng Pag-aapela or Hukuman ng Apelasyon; previously Hukuman ng Paghahabol) is an appellate collegiate court in the Philippines. It consists of one presiding justice and 68 associate justices. Pursuant to the Constitution, the Court of Appeals reviews decisions and orders of the regional trial courts, as well as awards, judgments, final orders, and resolutions issued or authorized by administrative agencies exercising quasi-judicial functions.

Its appellate jurisdiction also extends to decisions and resolutions of the National Amnesty Commission and the Office of the Ombudsman. Under Republic Act No. 9282, which elevated the Court of Tax Appeals to the same level as the Court of Appeals, decisions of the Court of Tax Appeals sitting en banc are reviewable by the Supreme Court rather than the Court of Appeals, contrary to the procedure provided under Section 1, Rule 43 of the Rules of Court. Decisions and resolutions of the National Labor Relations Commission (NLRC) are reviewable by the Court of Appeals through a petition for certiorari, rather than through direct recourse to the Supreme Court.

The Court of Appeals building is located on Maria Orosa Street in Ermita, Manila, on a site that formerly formed part of the University of the Philippines Manila campus.

== History ==
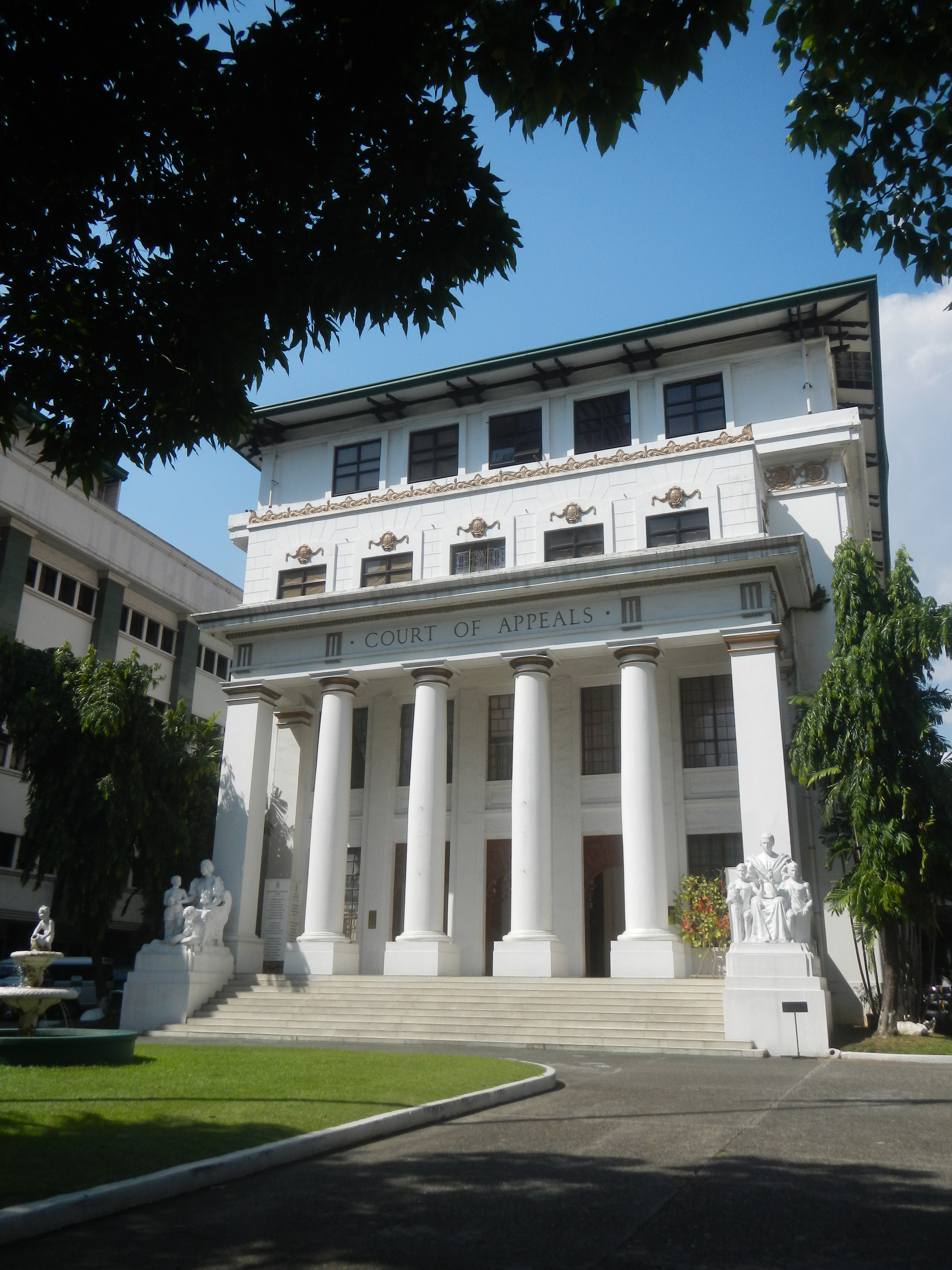
Court of Appeals building in Ermita, Manila

Organized on February 1, 1936, the Court of Appeals was initially composed of Justice Pedro Concepcion, as the first presiding judge, and ten appellate judges appointed by the president of the Philippines with the consent of the Commission on Appointments of the National Assembly. It had exclusive appellate jurisdiction of all cases not falling under the original and exclusive appellate jurisdiction of the seven-man Supreme Court. Its decisions in those cases were final, except when the Supreme Court upon petition for certiorari on questions of law required that the case be certified to it for review. It also had original jurisdiction to issue writs of mandamus, prohibition, injunction, certiorari, habeas corpus and all other auxiliary writs in aid of its appellate jurisdiction. The court then sat either en banc or in two divisions, one of six and another of five judges. The appellate judges had the same qualifications as those provided by the Constitution for Supreme Court justices.

In March 1938, the appellate judges were named justices and their number increased from eleven to fifteen, with three divisions of five under Commonwealth Act No. 259. On December 24, 1941, the membership of the court was further increased to nineteen justices under Executive Order No. 395.

The court functioned during the Japanese occupation from 1941 to 1944. However, in March 1945, due to abnormal conditions at the time, the court was abolished by President Sergio Osmeña through Executive Order No. 37. The end of World War II restored the democratic processes in the country. On October 4, 1946, Republic Act No. 52 was passed, recreating the Court of Appeals, with a presiding justice and fourteen associate justices. The court was composed of five divisions of three justices each.

On August 23, 1956, the membership of the court was expanded to eighteen justices per Republic Act No. 1605. The number was hiked to twenty-four justices as decreed by Republic Act No. 5204 approved on June 15, 1968. Ten years later, the unabated swelling of the court's dockets called for a much bigger court of forty-five justices under Presidential Decree No. 1482 of June 10, 1978. Then came the judiciary reorganization on January 17, 1983, through Executive Order No. 864 of President Ferdinand Marcos. The court was renamed the Intermediate Appellate Court, and its membership was enlarged to fifty-one justices. However, only thirty-seven justices were appointed to this court.

On July 28, 1986, President Corazon Aquino issued Executive Order No. 33, which restored the original name of the appellate court to the Court of Appeals and its presiding justice and fifty associate justices.

On February 23, 1995, Republic Act No. 7902 was passed, which expanded the jurisdiction of the court effective March 18, 1995. On December 30, 1996, Republic Act No. 8246 created six more divisions in the court, thereby increasing its membership from fifty-one to sixty-nine justices. These additional divisions—three for the Visayas and three for Mindanao—paved the way for the appellate court's regionalization. In the Visayas, the court sits in Cebu City, while Cagayan de Oro is home to the court for Mindanao.

On August 18, 2007, the then-president of the Cebu City Chapter of the Integrated Bar of the Philippines, Briccio Joseph Boholst, opposed the abolition of the court in Cebu City, as he claimed that it would cause inconvenience for both litigants and lawyers. Supreme Court Associate Justice Ruben Reyes was tasked to investigate and submit his recommendations to the High Tribunal regarding the alleged massive graft and corruption of justices, especially in the issuance of temporary restraining orders.

On February 1, 2018, the court celebrated its 82nd anniversary.

== Incumbent justices ==
The Court of Appeals consists of a presiding justice and sixty-eight associate justices. Among the current members of the court, Fernanda Lampas-Peralta is the longest-serving associate justice, with a tenure of 8,311 days (22 years, 275 days) as of November 11, 2026; the most recent justice to enter the court are Marietta S. Brawner-Cualing, Mary Josephine P. Lazaro, Ferdinand C. Baylon and Emilio Rodolfo Y. Legaspi III on August 29, 2024.

Post	Name of Incumbent Birthdate	Date of appointment	Appointed by	Date of Retirement (70 years old)	Succeeding
Presiding Justice	Fernanda Lampas-Peralta; June 26, 1960 (age 66)	November 18, 2024	Marcos Jr.	June 26, 2030	Punzalan-Castillo
Associate Justice	Ramon Bato Jr. (Senior Associate Justice); August 27, 1958 (age 68)	March 15, 2004	Macapagal-Arroyo	August 27, 2028	Regino
Associate Justice	Ramon Cruz; August 25, 1957 (age 69)	October 30, 2009	Macapagal-Arroyo	August 25, 2027	Bersamin
Associate Justice	Myra Garcia-Fernandez; June 24, 1963 (age 63)	February 16, 2010	Macapagal-Arroyo	June 24, 2033	del Castillo
Associate Justice	Eduardo Peralta Jr. September 29, 1962 (age 64)	February 16, 2010	Macapagal-Arroyo	September 29, 2032	Villarama Jr.
Associate Justice	Nina Antonio-Valenzuela; December 13, 1963 (age 62)	February 24, 2010	Macapagal-Arroyo	December 13, 2033	Dimaranan-Vidal
Associate Justice	Zenaida Galapate-Laguilles; December 16, 1962 (age 63)	March 15, 2011	Aquino III	December 16, 2032	Romilla-Lontok
Associate Justice	Pedro Corales; April 29, 1957 (age 69)	November 11, 2011	Aquino III	April 29, 2027	Aliño-Hormachuelos
Associate Justice	Marilyn Lagura-Yap; May 29, 1957 (age 69)	February 3, 2012	Aquino III	May 29, 2027	B. Reyes
Associate Justice	Maria Elisa Sempio-Diy; April 25, 1966 (age 60)	February 16, 2012	Aquino III	April 25, 2036	Perlas-Bernabe
Associate Justice	Pablito Perez; January 15, 1957 (age 69)	March 13, 2014	Aquino III	January 15, 2027	Alberto-Gacutan
Associate Justice	Germano Francisco Legaspi; January 29, 1969 (age 57)	January 8, 2015	Aquino III	January 29, 2039	Tolentino
Associate Justice	Ronaldo Roberto Martin; October 8, 1964 (age 62)	May 5, 2015	Aquino III	October 8, 2034	Veloso III
Associate Justice	Geraldine Fiel-Macaraig; March 25, 1963 (age 63)	November 6, 2015	Aquino III	March 25, 2033	de Guia-Salvador
Associate Justice	Gabriel Robeniol; June 7, 1961 (age 65)	November 6, 2015	Aquino III	June 7, 2031	Dicdican
Associate Justice	Ruben Reynaldo Roxas; March 30, 1962 (age 64)	November 6. 2015	Aquino III	March 30, 2032	M. Elbinas
Associate Justice	Louis Acosta; June 21, 1961 (age 65)	March 2, 2017	Duterte	June 21, 2031	Reyes-Carpio
Associate Justice	Tita Marilyn Payoyo-Villordon; September 16, 1959 (age 67)	June 28, 2017	Duterte	September 16, 2029	F. Acosta
Associate Justice	Walter S. Ong; October 13, 1968 (age 58)	November 28, 2017	Duterte	October 13, 2038	Tijam
Associate Justice	Emily Aliño-Geluz; October 5, 1971 (age 55)	April 30, 2018	Duterte	October 5, 2041	Real-Dimagiba
Associate Justice	Florencio Mamauag Jr. February 14, 1960 (age 66)	October 10, 2018	Duterte	February 14, 2030	S. Inting
Associate Justice	Lily Biton; October 14, 1961 (age 65)	July 8, 2019	Duterte	October 14, 2031	J. Reyes Jr.
Associate Justice	Carlito Calpatura; January 2, 1963 (age 63)	July 8, 2019	Duterte	January 2, 2033	M. de Leon
Associate Justice	Angelene Mary Quimpo-Sale; January 26, 1963 (age 63)	July 8, 2019	Duterte	January 26, 2033	Francisco
Associate Justice	Raymond Reynold Lauigan; September 27, 1968 (age 58)	March 2, 2020	Duterte	September 27, 2038	Borja
Associate Justice	Lorenza Bordios; August 23, 1965 (age 61)	March 2, 2020	Duterte	August 23, 2035	Carandang
Associate Justice	Richard Mordeno; November 29, 1966 (age 59)	March 2, 2020	Duterte	November 29, 2036	Lazaro-Javier
Associate Justice	Bonifacio Pascua; November 18, 1970 (age 55)	March 2, 2020	Duterte	November 18, 2040	Hernando
Associate Justice	Anisah Amanodin-Umpa; July 10, 1961 (age 65)	April 13, 2020	Duterte	July 10, 2031	Contreras
Associate Justice	Bautista Corpin Jr. September 7, 1965 (age 61)	April 13, 2020	Duterte	September 7, 2035	Salandnan-Manahan
Associate Justice	Roberto Quiroz; August 12, 1974 (age 52)	April 13, 2020	Duterte	August 12, 2034	H. Inting
Associate Justice	Nancy Rivas-Palmones; September 11, 1968 (age 58)	April 15, 2020	Duterte	September 11, 2038	Villon
Associate Justice	Alfonso Ruiz II; March 10, 1971 (age 55)	May 20, 2021	Duterte	March 10, 2041	M. Lopez
Associate Justice	Jennifer Joy Ong; October 12, 1978 (age 48)	May 20, 2021	Duterte	October 12, 2048	Quijano-Padila
Associate Justice	Michael Ong; December 18, 1975 (age 50)	May 20, 2021	Duterte	December 18, 2045	Gaerlan
Associate Justice	Maximo De Leon; November 10, 1965 (age 61)	May 24, 2021	Duterte	November 10, 2035	Lantion
Associate Justice	Ana Marie Mas; January 30, 1973 (age 53)	May 24, 2021	Duterte	January 30, 2040	Delos Santos
Associate Justice	Mercedita Dadole-Ygnacio; August 15, 1968 (age 58)	March 7, 2022	Duterte	August 15, 2038	Baltazar-Padilla
Associate Justice	Jaime Fortunato Caringal; October 10, 1977 (age 49)	March 7, 2022	Duterte	October 10, 2047	Rosario
Associate Justice	Eduardo Ramos Jr. October 23, 1979 (age 47)	March 7, 2022	Duterte	October 23, 2049	Librea-Leagogo
Associate Justice	Jill Rose Jaugan-Lo; March 9, 1972 (age 54)	March 7, 2022	Duterte	March 9, 2042	J. Lopez
Associate Justice	Rex Bernardo Pascual; October 6, 1966 (age 60)	March 7, 2022	Duterte	October 6, 2036	Ybañez
Associate Justice	Emily San Gaspar-Gito; January 19, 1973 (age 53)	March 7, 2022	Duterte	January 19, 2043	Diamante
Associate Justice	Jose Lorenzo Dela Rosa; January 22, 1973 (age 53)	March 7, 2022	Duterte	January 22, 2043	Lloren
Associate Justice	Mary Charlene Hernandez-Azura; February 19, 1963 (age 63)	March 8, 2022	Duterte	February 19, 2033	Salazar-Fernando
Associate Justice	Ronald Tolentino; July 13, 1966 (age 60)	March 8, 2022	Duterte	July 13, 2036	Cruz
Associate Justice	Rogelio Largo; May 16, 1973 (age 53)	March 8, 2022	Duterte	May 16, 2043	Bueser
Associate Justice	Eleutherio Bathan; April 27, 1971 (age 55)	May 19, 2022	Duterte	April 27, 2041	Dimaampao
Associate Justice	John Lee; February 24, 1980 (age 46)	May 19, 2022	Duterte	February 24, 2050	Montejo-Gonzaga
Associate Justice	Selma Palacio-Alaras; March 8, 1963 (age 63)	October 11, 2022	Marcos Jr.	March 8, 2033	Ingles
Associate Justice	Wilhelmina Jorge-Wagan; May 18, 1970 (age 56)	October 11, 2022	Marcos Jr.	May 18, 2040	Camello
Associate Justice	Raymond Joseph Javier; June 24, 1974 (age 52)	September 26, 2023	Marcos Jr.	October 23, 2046	Singh
Associate Justice	Maria Consejo Gengos-Ignalaga; February 19, 1978 (age 48)	September 26, 2023	Marcos Jr.	February 19, 2048	Barrios
Associate Justice	Lorna Francisca Chua-Cheng; October 24, 1962 (age 64)	September 26, 2023	Marcos Jr.	October 24, 2045	Posadas-Kahulugan
Associate Justice	Ferdinand C. Baylon; September 11, 1970 (age 56)	August 29, 2024	Marcos Jr.	September 11, 2040	Punzalan-Castillo
Associate Justice	Marietta S. Brawner-Cualing; May 28, 1973 (age 53)	August 29, 2024	Marcos Jr.	May 28, 2043	Badelles
Associate Justice	Mary Josephine D. P. Lazaro; April 24, 1968 (age 58)	August 29, 2024	Marcos Jr.	April 24, 2038	Garcia
Associate Justice	Emilio Rodolfo Y. Legaspi III; April 10, 1968 (age 58)	August 29, 2024	Marcos Jr.	April 10, 2038	Ampuan
Associate Justice	Joeffre Acebido; July 23, 1961 (age 65)	April 14, 2025	Marcos Jr.	July 23, 2031	Paredes
Associate Justice	Edilwasif Baddiri; December 13, 1975 (age 50)	April 14, 2025	Marcos Jr.	December 13, 2045	Sorongon
Associate Justice	Robert Victor Marcon; July 28, 1967 (age 59)	September 23, 2025	Marcos Jr.	July 28, 2037	Lampas-Peralta
Associate Justice	Snooky Maria Ana Bareno-Sagayo; December 29, 1967 (age 58)	September 23, 2025	Marcos Jr.	December 29, 2037	Jacinto Fajardo, Jr.
Associate Justice	Randolph A. Pascasio; December 29, 1967 (age 58)	August 4, 2026	Marcos Jr.	December 29, 2037	Azcarraga-Jacob
Associate Justice	Pia Cristina B. Bersamin-Embuscado	October 5, 2026	Marcos Jr.		Arellano-Morales
Associate Justice	Allan Batarra Gepty	October 5, 2026	Marcos Jr.		Gonzales-Sison
Associate Justice	Leilani Marie Dacanay-Grimares	October 5, 2026	Marcos Jr.		Bruselas Jr.
Associate Justice	Vacant		Marcos Jr.		Santos
Associate Justice	Vacant		Marcos Jr.		Atal-Paño
Associate Justice	Vacant		Marcos Jr.		Maxino

=== Divisions ===
In View of the recent retirement of Associate Justice Marlene B. Gonzales-Sison and the optional retirement of Associate Justice Rafael Antonio M. Santos effective on February 28, 2026, taking into consideration of the order of seniority under Rule 1 of the 2009 Internal Rules of the Court of Appeals, and the statement of Preference to transfer to Manila by Associate Justice Rogelio G. Largo from the Visayas Station, the new composition of the Divisions of the Court in conjunction with Office Order No. 85-26-FLP, effective on March 2, 2026, shall be as follows:

Division	Chairperson	Members
1st	F. Lampas-Peralta	T. Payoyo-Villordon; E. San Gaspar-Gito
2nd	R. Bato Jr.	W. Ong; J. L. Delta Rosa
3rd	R. Cruz	E. Aliño-Geluz; M. Hernandez-Azura
4th	M. Garcia-Fernandez	F. Mamauag, Jr.; R. Largo
5th	E. Peralta, Jr.	C. Calpatura; E. Bathan
6th	N. Antonio-Valenzuela	A. Quimpo-Sale; S. Palacio-Alaras
7th	Z. Galapate-Laguilles	R. Lauigan; W. Jorge-Wagan
8th	P. Corales	R. Bordios; R. Javier
9th	M. Sempio-Diy	B. Pascua; M. Gengos-Ignalaga
10th	P. Perez	R. Quiroz; L. Chua-Cheng
11th	G. Legaspi	A. Ruiz; E. Legaspi
12th	R. Martin	J. Ong; M. J. Lazaro
13th	G. Fiel-Macaraig	M. Ong; F. Baylon
14th	G. Robeniol	M. De Leon; M. Brawner-Cualing
15th	P. Atal-Paño	E. Ramos, Jr.; E. Baddiri
16th	R. Roxas	J. Caringal; F. Baylon (acting)
17th	L. Acosta	R. B. Pascual; M. Brawner-Cualing (acting)
Visayas Station
18th	P. Abella Maxino; Executive Justice	N. Palmones; R. V. Marcon
19th	M. Lagura-Yap	M. Dadole-Ygnacio; R. A. Pascasio
20th	B. Corpin Jr.	R. Tolentino; R. V. Marcon (acting)
Mindanao Station
21st	L. Biton; Executive Justice	A. Mas; J. Acebido
22nd	R. Mordeno	J. Jaugan-Lo; S. Bareno-Sagayo
23rd	A. Amanodin-Umpa	J. Lee; S. Bareno-Sagayo (acting)

== Demographics ==
=== By appointing president ===
President	Number (Percentage)	Justices	Number Changes
Duterte	35 (50.72%)	L. Acosta; E. Aliño-Geluz; A. Amanodin-Umpa; E. Arellano-Morales; E. Bathan; L. Biton; L. Bordios; C. Calpatura; J. Caringal; B. Corpin Jr.; M. Dadole-Ygnacio; J. Dela Rosa; M. De Leon; J. Fajardo Jr.; M. Hernandez-Azura; J. Jaugan-Lo; R. Largo; R. Lauigan; J. Lee; F. Mamauag Jr.; A. Mas; R. Moderno; J. Ong; M. Ong; W. Ong; B. Pascua; R. Pascual; T. Payoyo-Villordon; A. Quimpo-Sale; R. Quiroz; E. Ramos Jr.; N. Rivas-Palmones; A. Ruiz II; E. San Gaspar-Gito; R. Tolentino	Steady
Aquino III	14 (20.29%)	P. Abella-Maximo; P. Atal-Paño; M. Azcarraga-Jacob; P. Corales; G. Fiel-Macaraig; Z. Galapate-Laguelles; M. Lagura-Yap; G. Legaspi; R. Martin; P. Perez; G. Robeniol; R. Roxas; R. Santos; M. Sempio Diy	▼ by 1
Macapagal-Arroyo	11 (14.49%)	N. Antonio-Valenzuela; R. Bato, Jr.; A. Bruselas, Jr.; R. Cruz; M. Garcia-Fernandez; M. Gonzales-Sison; F. Lampas-Peralta Senior Associate Justice; E. Peralta, Jr.; M. Punzalan-Castillo Presiding Justice; E. Sorongon	Steady
Marcos Jr.	5 (7.25%)	W. Jorge-Wagan; S. Palacio-Alaras; R. Javier; M. Gengos-Ipalanga; L. Chua-Cheng	Steady
Vacant		5 (5.8%)	▲ by 1

=== By Gender ===
Gender	Total (Percentage)	Justices	
Male	34 (49.28%)	L. Acosta; E. Bathan; R. Bato, Jr.; A. Bruselas, Jr.; C. Calpatura; J. Caringal; P. Corales; B. Corpin Jr.; R. Cruz; J. Dela Rosa; M. De Leon; J. Fajardo Jr.; R. Guevarra; R. Largo; R. Lauigan; J. Lee; G. Legaspi; F. Mamauag, Jr.; R. Martin; R. Mordeno; M. Ong; W. Ong; B. Pascua; R. Pascual; E. Peralta, Jr.; P. Perez<; R. Quroz; E. Ramos Jr.; R. Robeniol; R. Roxas; A. Ruiz II; R. Santos; E. Sorongon; R. Tolentino	Steady
Female	29 (44.9%)	P. Abella-Maxino; M. Antonio-Valenzuela; E. Aliño-Geluz; A. Amanodin-Umpa; E. Arellano-Morales; P. Atal-Paño; M. Azcarraga-Jacob; L. Biton; L. Bordios; L. Chua-Cheng; M. Dadole-Ygnacio; G. Fiel-Macaraig; Z. Galapate-Laguelles; M. Garcia-Fernandez; M. Gengos-Ipalanga; M. Gonzales-Sison; M. Hernandez-Azura; J. Jaugan-Lo; W. Jorge-Wagan; M. Lagura-Yap; F. Lampas-Peralta Senior Associate Justice; A. Train-Mas; J. Chua-Ong; S. Palacio-Alaras; T. Payoyo-Villordon; A. Quimpo-Sale; N. Rivas-Palmones; E. San Gaspar-Gito; M. Sempio-Diy	▼ by 1
Vacant		1 (4.35%)	▲ by 2

=== By tenure ===
Year	Total Retiring	Justices
2026	3	A. Buselas Jr. P. Atal-Paño p. Abell-Maximo
2027	4	P. Perez; P. Corales; M. Lagura-yap; R. Cruz
2028	1	R. Bato, Jr.
2029	1	T. Payoyo-Villordon
2030	2	F. Manauag Jr. F. Lampas-Peralta
2031	4	G. Robeniol; L. Acosta; A. Amanodin-Umpa; L. Biton
2032	3	R. Roxas; E. Peralta; Z. Galapate-Laguiles
2033	5	C. Capaltura; A. Quimpo-Sale; G. Econg; M. Garcia-Fernandez; N. Antonio-Valenzuela; R. Martin
2034	1	R. Quiroz
2035	3	L. Bordios Jr. B. Corpin Jr. M de Leon
2036	5	R. Pascual; M. Sempio-Diy; R. Tolentino; R. Moderno
2038	3	N. Rivas-Palmones; R. Lauigan; W. Ong
2039	2	R. Legazpi
2040	3	A. Mas; M. Dadole-Ygnacio; B. Pascua
2041	3	A. Ruiz II; E. Bathan; E. Aliño-Geluz
2042	1	J. Jaugan-Lo
2043	3	E. San Gaspar-Gito; J. dela Rosa; R. Largo; S. Palacio-Alaras
2044	1	M. Hernandez-Azura
2045	3	M. Ong; L. Chua-Cheng; W. Jorge-Wagan
2046	1	R. Javier
2047	1	J. Caringal
2048	2	J. Chua-Ong; M. Consejo-Ipalanga
2049	1	E. Ramos
2050	1	J. Lee

== List of presiding justices ==
No.	Portrait	Name (birth–death)	Tenure start	Tenure end	Tenure length	Appointed by
1		Pedro Concepcion (1893–1969)	February 1, 1936	October 27, 1936	269 days	Manuel L. Quezon
2		Antonio Horrilleno (1878–1964)	January 16, 1937	June 6, 1940	3 years, 142 days	Manuel L. Quezon
3		Ricardo Paras (1891–1984)	June 24, 1940	December 28, 1941	1 year, 187 days	Manuel L. Quezon
4		Jose Generoso (1881–1959)	February 5, 1942	January 23, 1944	1 year, 352 days	Jorge B. Vargas
5		Marcelino Montemayor (1890–1971)	November 19, 1946	August 6, 1948	1 year, 261 days	Manuel Roxas
6		Luis Torres (1880–1959)	August 21, 1948	August 20, 1949	364 days	Elpidio Quirino
7		Fernando Jugo (1891–1956)	August 20, 1949	October 6, 1950	1 year, 47 days	Elpidio Quirino
8		Alejo Labrador (1894–1967)	October 6, 1950	April 22, 1952	1 year, 199 days	Elpidio Quirino
9		Pompeyo Diaz (1904–1987)	November 10, 1952	February 13, 1954	1 year, 95 days	Elpidio Quirino
10		J. B. L. Reyes (1902–1994)	February 14, 1954	June 30, 1954	136 days	Ramon Magsaysay
11		Pastor Endencia (1890–1981)	June 30, 1954	December 20, 1955	1 year, 173 days	Ramon Magsaysay
12		Alfonso Felix (1888–1968)	December 28, 1955	July 20, 1956	205 days	Ramon Magsaysay
13		Jose Gutierrez David (1891–1977)	August 1, 1956	August 15, 1959	3 years, 14 days	Ramon Magsaysay
14		Jose Maria Paredes (1895–1977)	August 15, 1959	July 27, 1960	347 days	Carlos P. Garcia
15		Dionisio de Leon (1892–1963)	August 19, 1960	April 28, 1961	252 days	Carlos P. Garcia
16		Querube Makalintal (1910–2002)	April 29, 1961	May 23, 1962	1 year, 24 days	Carlos P. Garcia
17		Jose P. Bengzon (1898–1990)	May 24, 1962	September 12, 1964	2 years, 111 days	Diosdado Macapagal
18		Conrado Sanchez (1900–1983)	September 12, 1964	January 23, 1966	1 year, 133 days	Diosdado Macapagal
19		Eugenio Angeles (1898–1977)	July 1, 1966	June 30, 1967	364 days	Ferdinand Marcos
20		Franciscso Capistrano (1899–1980)	July 5, 1967	September 16, 1968	1 year, 73 days	Ferdinand Marcos
21		Julio Villamor (1902–1988)	September 16, 1968	January 17, 1970	1 year, 123 days	Ferdinand Marcos
22		Salvador Esguerra (1906–1979)	January 17, 1970	July 1, 1972	2 years, 166 days	Ferdinand Marcos
23		Juan Enriquez	July 1, 1972	May 6, 1973	309 days	Ferdinand Marcos
24		Antonio Lucero	May 6, 1973	April 28, 1976	2 years, 358 days	Ferdinand Marcos
25		Magno Gatmaitan	April 28, 1976	January 1, 1978	1 year, 248 days	Ferdinand Marcos
26		Andres Reyes Sr.	January 1, 1978	September 3, 1979	1 year, 245 days	Ferdinand Marcos
27		Lourdes San Diego	September 4, 1979	April 21, 1980	230 days	Ferdinand Marcos
28		Buenaventura de la Fuente (1922–2000)	January 18, 1983	February 21, 1984	1 year, 34 days	Ferdinand Marcos
29		Emilio Gancayco (1921–2009)	August 1, 1986	January 12, 1987	164 days	Corazon Aquino
30		Carolina Griño-Aquino (1923–2012)	January 31, 1987	April 19, 1988	1 year, 79 days	Corazon Aquino
31		Rodolfo Nocon (1928–2000)	October 17, 1988	December 2, 1991	3 years, 46 days	Corazon Aquino
32		Jose Melo (1932–2020)	December 2, 1991	August 12, 1992	254 days	Corazon Aquino
33		Lorna Lombos-de la Fuente	December 1, 1992	February 26, 1993	87 days	Fidel V. Ramos
34		Serafin Camilon	May 21, 1993	August 16, 1993	87 days	Fidel V. Ramos
35		Vicente Mendoza (born 1933)	January 10, 1994	June 10, 1994	151 days	Fidel V. Ramos
36		Nathanael de Pano Jr.	June 11, 1994	August 3, 1997	3 years, 53 days	Fidel V. Ramos
37		Fidel Purisima (1930–2013)	August 4, 1997	January 26, 1998	175 days	Fidel V. Ramos
38		Arturo Buena (1932–2020)	January 26, 1998	January 5, 1999	344 days	Fidel V. Ramos
39		Jesus Elbinias (1930–2012)	February 5, 1999	October 15, 1999	252 days	Joseph Estrada
40		Jainal Rasul	October 16, 1999	December 6, 1999	51 days	Joseph Estrada
41		Salome Montoya	December 7, 1999	March 14, 2001	1 year, 97 days	Joseph Estrada
42		Alicia Austria-Martinez (born 1940)	July 1, 2001	April 9, 2002	282 days	Gloria Macapagal Arroyo
43		Cancio Garcia (1937–2013)	April 9, 2002	October 6, 2004	2 years, 180 days	Gloria Macapagal Arroyo
44		Eubulo Verzola	October 6, 2004	January 27, 2005	113 days	Gloria Macapagal Arroyo
45		Romeo A. Brawner (1935–2008)	January 28, 2005	September 16, 2005	231 days	Gloria Macapagal Arroyo
46		Ruben Reyes (1939–2021)	December 23, 2005	August 1, 2007	1 year, 221 days	Gloria Macapagal Arroyo
47		Conrado Vasquez Jr. (born 1940)	December 1, 2007	January 6, 2010	2 years, 36 days	Gloria Macapagal Arroyo
48		Andres Reyes Jr. (born 1950)	February 22, 2010	July 12, 2017	7 years, 140 days	Gloria Macapagal Arroyo
49		Romeo Barza (born 1949)	December 8, 2017	August 2, 2019	1 year, 237 days	Rodrigo Duterte
50		Remedios Salazar-Fernando (born 1953)	November 25, 2020	September 2, 2023	2 years, 281 days	Rodrigo Duterte
51		Mariflor Punzalan-Castillo (born 1954)	November 16, 2023	September 21, 2024	310 days	Bongbong Marcos
52		Fernanda Lampas-Peralta (born 1960)	November 18, 2024	Incumbent	1 year, 358 days	Bongbong Marcos

== Former justices ==
Name	Position	Date of appointment	Date of retirement	Predecessor	Reason for termination
Pedro Concepcion	Presiding judge	February 01, 1936	October 27, 1936	New Seat	Appointed Supreme Court justice
Antonio S. Horilleno	Appellate judge	February 05, 1936	January 16, 1937	New Seat	Promoted Presiding judge
Antonio S. Horilleno	Presiding judge	January 16, 1937	June 06, 1940	Pedro Concepcion	Appointed Supreme Court justice
César Bengzon	Appellate judge	February 05, 1936	January 23, 1942	New Seat	Abolished by the Japanese Military Administration
César Bengzon	Associate Justice	February 24, 1942	January 23, 1944	New Seat	Reorganized the Court of Appeals into District Court of Appeals
César Bengzon	Presiding Justice	January 23, 1944	March 10, 1945	New Seat	Interrupted due to Battle of Manila
Domingo F. Imperial	Appellate judge	February 05, 1936	January 23, 1942	New Seat	Abolished by the Japanese Military Administration
Domingo F. Imperial	Associate Justice	February 24, 1942	January 23, 1944	New Seat	Reorganized the Court of Appeals into District Court of Appeals
Francisco Afan Delgado	Appellate judge	February 05, 1936	November 01, 1936	New Seat	Resigned to continue practicing law
Jose M. Hontiveros	Appellate judge	February 05, 1936	January 23, 1942	New Seat	Abolished by the Japanese Military Administration
Jose M. Hontiveros	Associate justice	February 24, 1942	January 23, 1944	New Seat	Reorganized the Court of Appeals into District Court of Appeals
Manuel V. Moran	Appellate judge	February 05, 1936	December 08, 1938	New Seat	Appointed Supreme Court justice
Ricardo Paras	Appellate judge	February 05, 1936	June 24, 1940	New Seat	Promoted Presiding justice
Ricardo Paras	Presiding justice	June 24, 1940	December 28, 1941	Antonio S. Horilleno	Appointed Supreme Court justice
Teofilo Sison	Appellate judge	February 05, 1936	November 01, 1938	New Seat	Appointed DND Secretary
Mariano A. Albert	Appellate judge	February 05, 1936	January 23, 1942	New Seat	Abolished by the Japanese Military Administration
Mariano A. Albert	Associate justice	February 24, 1942	January 23, 1944	New Seat	Reorganized the Court of Appeals into District Court of Appeals
Sabino B. Padilla	Appellate judge	December 29, 1936	January 23, 1944	New Seat	Abolished by the Japanese Military Administration
Sabino B. Padilla	Associate justice	February 24, 1942	January 23, 1944	New Seat	Reorganized the Court of Appeals into District Court of Appeals
Sabino B. Padilla	Associate justice	January 23, 1944	March 10, 1945	New Seat	Interrupted due to Battle of Manila
Jose Lopez-Vito	Appellate judge	December 29, 1936	May 13, 1941	Francisco A. Delgado	Appointed COMELEC Commissioner
Jose Lopez-Vito	Associate justice	February 24, 1942	January 23, 1944	New Seat	Reorganized the Court of Appeals into District Court of Appeals
Manuel C. Briones	Appellate judge	January 16, 1937	January 23, 1942	Antonio S. Horilleno	Abolished by the Japanese Military Administration
Manuel C. Briones	Associate justice	February 24, 1942	January 23, 1944	New Seat	Reorganized the Court of Appeals into District Court of Appeals
Hermogenes S. Reyes	Associate justice	June 24, 1938	January 23, 1942	New Seat	Abolished by the Japanese Military Administration
Hermogenes S. Reyes	Associate justice	February 24, 1942	January 23, 1944	New Seat	Reorganized the Court of Appeals into District Court of Appeals
Marceliano R. Montemayor	Associate justice	June 24, 1938	January 23, 1942	New Seat	Abolished by the Japanese Military Administration
Marceliano R. Montemayor	Associate justice	February 24, 1942	January 23, 1944	New Seat	Reorganized the Court of Appeals into District Court of Appeals
Marceliano R. Montemayor	Presiding justice	January 23, 1944	March 10, 1945	New Seat	Interrupted due to Battle of Manila
Marceliano R. Montemayor	Presiding justice	November 19, 1946	August 06, 1948	New Seat	Appointed Supreme Court justice
Pedro T. Tuazon	Associate justice	June 24, 1938	January 23, 1942	New Seat	Abolished by the Japanese Military Administration
Pedro T. Tuazon	Associate justice	February 24, 1942	January 23, 1944	New Seat	Reorganized the Court of Appeals into District Court of Appeals
Pedro T. Tuazon	Associate justice	January 23, 1944	March 10, 1945	New Seat	Interrupted due to Battle of Manila
Francisco A. Enage	Associate justice	November 16, 1938	January 23, 1942	New Seat	Abolished by the Japanese Military Administration
Francisco A. Enage	Associate justice	February 24, 1942	January 23, 1944	New Seat	Reorganized the Court of Appeals into District Court of Appeals
Alexander A. Reyes	Associate justice	December 17, 1938	January 23, 1942	Manuel V. Moran	Abolished by the Japanese Military Administration
Alexander A. Reyes	Associate justice	February 24, 1942	January 23, 1944	New Seat	Reorganized the Court of Appeals into District Court of Appeals
Alexander A. Reyes	Associate justice	November 19, 1946	August 06, 1948	New Seat	Appointed Supreme Court justice
Jose P. Melencio	Associate justice	July 29, 1940	January 23, 1942	Ricardo M. Paras	Abolished by the Japanese Military Administration
Jose P. Melencio	Associate justice	February 24, 1942	January 23, 1944	New Seat	Reorganized the Court of Appeals into District Court of Appeals
Jose P. Melencio	Associate justice	January 23, 1944	March 10, 1945	New Seat	Interrupted due to Battle of Manila
Luis P. Torres	Associate justice	July 29, 1940	January 23, 1942	Teofilo Sison	Abolished by the Japanese Military Administration
Luis P. Torres	Associate justice	February 24, 1942	January 23, 1944	New Seat	Reorganized the Court of Appeals into District Court of Appeals
Luis P. Torres	Associate justice	January 23, 1944	March 10, 1945	New Seat	Interrupted due to Battle of Manila
Luis P. Torres	Associate justice	November 19, 1946	August 21, 1948	New Seat	Reinstated; Promoted Presiding justice
Luis P. Torres	Presiding justice	August 21, 1948	August 20, 1949	Appointed Supreme Court justice	
Jose Generoso	Associate justice	June 17, 1941	January 23, 1944	Jose Lopez-Vito	Abolished by the Japanese Military Administration
Jose Generoso	Presiding justice	February 24, 1942	January 23, 1944	New Seat	Reorganized the Court of Appeals into District Court of Appeals
Jose Generoso	Presiding justice	January 23, 1944	March 10, 1945	New Seat	Interrupted due to Battle of Manila
Serafin P. Hilado	Associate justice	February 24, 1942	January 23, 1944	New Seat	Reorganized the Court of Appeals into District Court of Appeals
Francisco Zulueta	Associate justice	February 24, 1942	January 23, 1944	New Seat	Reorganized the Court of Appeals into District Court of Appeals
Francisco Lavides	Associate justice	October 13, 1943	December 16, 1943	New Seat	Appointed as Counsellor in the Embassy of the Philippines in Tokyo
Dionisio F. de Leon	Associate justice	January 23, 1944	September 14, 1944	New Seat	Appointed as Commissioner for Administrative District 2
Dionisio F. de Leon	Associate justice	August 21, 1948	October 07, 1960	Luis P. Torres	Promoted Presiding justice
Dionisio F. de Leon	Presiding justice	October 07, 1960	April 10, 1961	Jose Ma. Paredes	Appointed Supreme Court justice
Proceso E. Sebastian	Associate justice	January 23, 1944	September 14, 1944	New Seat	Appointed as Commissioner for Administrative District 1
Arturo Buena	Associate justice	August 1, 1986	January 27, 1998		
Arturo Buena	Presiding justice	January 27, 1998	January 5, 1999		Appointed Supreme Court justice
Jorge Imperial	Associate justice	January 13, 1987	January 5, 1999		
Jorge Imperial	Presiding justice	January 5, 1999	February 4, 1999		
Eduardo Bengzon	Associate justice	January 13, 1987	December 15, 1992		
Conrado Limcaoco	Associate justice	January 13, 1987	September 12, 1990		
Bonifacio Cacdac Jr.	Associate justice	January 13, 1987	December 11, 1991		
Alfredo Benipayo	Associate justice	February 4, 1987	October 30, 1996		
Cecilio Pe	Associate justice	February 4, 1987	February 4, 1990		
Jesus Elbinias	Associate justice	February 4, 1987	February 5, 1999		
Jesus Elbinias	Presiding justice	February 5, 1999	October 15, 1999		
Nicolas Lapeña Jr.	Associate justice	February 4, 1987	March 1, 1993		
Justo Torres Jr.	Associate justice	February 4, 1987	March 11, 1996	Appointed Supreme Court justice	
Minerva Gonzaga-Reyes	Associate justice	March 25, 1987	January 5, 1999	Appointed Supreme Court justice	
Fernando Santiago	Associate justice	April 21, 1988	January 27, 1993		
Asaali Isnani	Associate justice	April 21, 1988	March 5, 1995		
Regina Ordoñez Benitez	Associate justice	April 21, 1988	September 7, 1993		
Luis Victor	Associate justice	April 21, 1988	August 25, 1993		
Abelardo Dayrit	Associate justice	October 5, 1988	February 12,1991		
Alicia Sempio-Diy	Associate justice	October 5, 1988	June 1, 1993		
Cesar Francisco	Associate justice	October 5, 1988	October 6, 1995		
Eduardo Abaya	Associate justice	October 5, 1988	May 22, 1989		
Filemon Mendoza	Associate justice	October 30, 1989	March 8, 1992		
Artemon Luna	Associate justice	October 30, 1989	October 8, 1999		
Jaina Rasul	Associate justice	October 30, 1989	October 16, 1999		
Jaina Rasul	Presiding justice	October 16, 1999	December 6, 1999		
Socorro Liwag	Associate justice	October 30, 1989	June 26, 1990		
Serafin Guingona	Associate justice	October 30, 1989	August 23, 1995		
Salome Montoya	Associate justice	January 25, 1990	December 7, 1999		
Salome Montoya	Presiding justice	December 7, 1999	March 14, 2001		
Fortunato Vailoces	Associate justice	May 26, 1990	December 16, 1993		
Consuelo Ynares-Santiago	Associate justice	November 26, 1990	April 6, 1999	Appointed Supreme Court justice	
Cancio Garcia	Associate justice	November 26, 1990	April 11, 2003		
Cancio Garcia	Acting Presiding justice	March 15, 2001	June 30, 2001		
Cancio Garcia	Presiding justice	April 11, 2002	October 6, 2004	Appointed Supreme Court justice	
Quirino Abad Santos Jr.	Associate justice	November 26, 1990	August 20, 2003		
Fermin Martin Jr.	Associate justice	November 26, 1990	August 31, 2003		
Eduardo Montenegro	Associate justice	October 9, 1991	August 21, 1998		
Angelina Sandoval-Gutierrez	Associate justice	October 9, 1991	December 22, 2000	Appointed Supreme Court justice	
Alicia Austria-Martinez	Associate justice	March 3, 1992	July 27, 2001	Appointed Supreme Court justice	
Alicia Austria-Martinez	Presiding justice	July 1, 2001	April 9, 2002	Appointed Supreme Court justice	
Ricardo Galvez	Associate justice	March 3, 1992	July 3, 1998		
Pacita Cañizares-Nye	Associate justice	March 3, 1992	February 27, 1997		
Lourdes Tayao-Jaguros	Associate justice	March 30, 1993	November 13, 1997		
Bernardo Pardo	Associate justice	March 30, 1993	February 17, 1995	Appointed Comelec Chairman	
Corona Ibay-Somera	Associate justice	March 30, 1993	May 14, 2000		
Buenaventura Guerrero	Associate justice	March 30, 1993	September 10, 2003		
Alfredo Lagamon	Associate justice	March 30, 1993	June 1, 1994		
Ramon Mabutas Jr.	Associate justice	March 30, 1993	September 30, 2003		
Eubulo Verzola	Associate justice	March 30, 1993	October 6, 2004		
Eubulo Verzola	Presiding justice	October 6, 2004	January 27, 2005		
Ramon Barcelona	Associate justice	March 22, 1994	January 12, 2002		
Hector Hofileña	Associate justice	March 22, 1994	December 30, 1999		
Godardo Jacinto	Associate justice	March 22, 1994	August 2, 2007		
Godardo Jacinto	Presiding justice	September 16, 2005	December 23, 2005		
Eugenio Labitoria	Associate justice	March 22, 1994	December 13, 2005		
Delilah Vidallon-Magtolis	Associate justice	March 22, 1994	November 29, 2006		
Conchita Carpio-Morales	Associate justice	March 22, 1994	August 26, 2002	Appointed Supreme Court justice	
Ruben Reyes	Associate justice	March 22, 1994	December 23, 2005	Appointed Supreme Court justice	
Ruben Reyes	Presiding justice	December 23, 2005	August 2, 2007	Appointed Supreme Court justice	
Conrado M. Vasquez Jr.	Associate justice	March 22, 1994	August 2, 2007		
Conrado M. Vasquez Jr.	Presiding justice	August 2, 2007	January 6, 2010		
Bernardo Salas	Associate justice	March 22, 1994	October 20, 2003		
Romeo Callejo Sr.	Associate justice	November 9, 1994	August 26, 2002	Appointed Supreme Court justice	
Bennie Adefuin de la Cruz	Associate justice	November 9, 1994	May 14, 2004		
Romeo A. Brawner Sr.	Associate justice	August 28, 1995	January 28, 2005		
Romeo A. Brawner Sr.	Presiding justice	January 28, 2005	September 16, 2005		
Portia Aliño-Hormachuelos	Associate justice	August 28, 1995	July 23, 2011		
Portia Aliño-Hormachuelos	Presiding justice	January 7, 2010	February 21, 2010		
Oswaldo Agcaoili	Associate justice	August 28, 1995	November 10, 2003		
Salvador Valdez Jr.	Associate justice	August 28, 1995	April 30, 2006		
Hilarion Aquino	Associate justice	November 3, 1995	October 21, 2002		
Maximiano Asuncion	Associate justice	April 5, 1996	October 3, 1997		
Artemio Tuquero	Associate justice	April 15, 1996	February 26, 2000		
Demetrio Demetria	Associate justice	October 8, 1996	November 30, 2003		
Omar Amin	Associate justice	October 8, 1996	December 3, 1999		
Roberto Barrios	Associate justice	September 10, 1997	May 1, 2006	Early Retirement	
Marina Buzon	Associate justice	September 10, 1997	March 19, 2008		
Rodrigo Cosico	Associate justice	September 10, 1997	July 4, 2008		
Bernardo Abesamis	Associate justice	April 22, 1998	August 29, 2003		
Eloy Bello Jr.	Associate justice	April 22, 1998	November 2, 2004		
Teodoro Regino	Associate justice	April 22, 1998	November 20, 2003		
Candido Rivera	Associate justice	April 22, 1998	April 11, 2005		
Mariano Umali	Associate justice	April 22, 1998	December 10, 2003		
Presbitero Velasco, Jr.	Associate justice	April 22, 1998	August 8, 2003		
Martin Villarama Jr.	Associate justice	April 22, 1998	November 6, 2009	Appointed Supreme Court justice	
Renato Dacudao	Associate justice	April 22, 1998	June 19, 2007		
Andres Reyes Jr.	Associate justice	May 21, 1999	February 22, 2010	Appointed Supreme Court justice	
Andres Reyes Jr.	Presiding justice	February 22, 2010	July 12, 2017	Appointed Supreme Court justice	
Remedios Salazar-Fernando	Associate justice	May 21, 1999	November 25, 2020		
Remedios Salazar-Fernando	Acting Presiding justice	July 12, 2017	December 8, 2017		
Remedios Salazar-Fernando	Presiding justice	August 3, 2019	September 2, 2023		
Wenceslao Agnir Jr.	Associate justice	May 21, 1999	December 20, 2002		
Elvi John Asuncion	Associate justice	May 21, 1999	February 17, 2006		
Mercedes Gozo-Dadole	Associate justice	May 21, 1999	December 20, 2005		
Jose Sabio Jr.	Associate justice	May 21, 1999	May 25, 2009		
Eriberto Rosario Jr.	Associate justice	May 21, 1999	September 20, 2003		
Edgardo Cruz	Associate justice	May 21, 1999	May 12, 2009		
Bienvenido Reyes	Associate justice	August 22, 2000	August 20, 2011	Appointed Supreme Court justice	
Alicia Santos	Associate justice	August 22, 2000	March 14, 2003		
Eliezer Delos Santos	Associate justice	August 22, 2000	August 31, 2005		
Perlita Tria-Tirona	Associate justice	August 22, 2000	October 15, 2005		
Josefina Guevara-Salonga	Associate justice	August 22, 2000	February 14, 2012		
Rebecca De Guia-Salvador	Associate justice	August 22, 2000	January 31, 2015	Early Retirement	
Juan Enriquez Jr.	Associate justice	August 22, 2000	June 20, 2012		
Mariano del Castillo	Associate justice	August 27, 2001	July 29, 2009	Appointed Supreme Court justice	
Amelita Tolentino	Associate justice	August 27, 2001	July 4, 2014		
Mario Guariña III	Associate justice	August 27, 2001	November 11, 2011		
Sergio Pestaño	Associate justice	August 27, 2001	October 15, 2005		
Danilo Pine	Associate justice	April 15, 2002	December 27, 2005		
Regalado Maambong	Associate justice	April 15, 2002	January 2, 2009		
Edgardo F. Sundiam	Associate justice	April 15, 2002	February 28, 2007		
Lucas Bersamin	Associate justice	April 15, 2002	April 3, 2009	Appointed Supreme Court justice	
Rosmari Carandang	Associate justice	March 10, 2003	November 26, 2018	Appointed Supreme Court justice	
Hakim Abdulwahid	Associate justice	March 10, 2003	June 12, 2015		
Noel G. Tijam	Associate justice	March 10, 2003	March 8, 2017	Appointed Supreme Court justice	
Arsenio Magpale	Associate justice	March 10, 2003	July 3, 2007		
Jose C. Mendoza	Associate justice	July 4, 2003	January 4, 2010	Appointed Supreme Court justice	
Rosalinda Asuncion-Vicente	Associate justice	July 16, 2003	November 23, 2013		
Arturo D. Brion	Associate justice	July 16, 2003	March 17, 2008	Appointed DOLE Secretary	
Jose Reyes Jr.	Associate justice	July 18, 2003	August 10, 2018	Appointed Supreme Court justice	
Fernanda Lampas-Peralta	Associate justice	February 9, 2004	November 18, 2024	Appointed Presiding Justice	
Aurora Santiago-Lagman	Associate justice	February 9, 2004	January 16, 2008		
Vicente Roxas	Associate justice	February 9, 2004	June 12, 2008		
Magdangal De Leon	Associate justice	February 9, 2004	August 19, 2018		
Vicente Veloso	Associate justice	February 9, 2004	January 7, 2015		
Mariflor Punzalan-Castillo	Associate justice	March 15, 2004	November 16, 2023	Appointed Presiding Justice	
Mariflor Punzalan-Castillo	Presiding justice	November 16, 2023	September 21, 2024		
Isaias Dicdican	Associate justice	March 15, 2004	July 4, 2015		
Santiago Ranada Jr.	Associate justice	March 15, 2004	November 20, 2006		
Arcangelita Romilla-Lontok	Associate justice	March 15, 2004	March 18, 2010		
Lucenito Tagle	Associate justice	March 15, 2004	June 26, 2008		
Japar Dimaampao	Associate justice	March 15, 2004	July 2, 2021	Appointed Supreme Court justice	
Celia Librea-Leagogo	Associate justice	March 15, 2004	December 15, 2020		
Monina Arevalo Zenarosa	Associate justice	March 15, 2004	August 22, 2009		
Pampio Abarintos	Associate justice	March 15, 2004	December 14, 2013		
Estela Perlas-Bernabe	Associate justice	March 15, 2004	September 16, 2011	Appointed Supreme Court justice	
Teresita Dy-Liacco Flores	Associate justice	March 15, 2004	March 31, 2011		
Arturo Tayag	Associate justice	March 15, 2004	March 2, 2010		
Sesinando Villon	Associate justice	March 15, 2004	July 16, 2019		
Vicente Yap	Associate justice	March 15, 2004	August 22, 2006		
Romulo Borja	Associate justice	March 15, 2004	September 11, 2018		
Edgardo Camello	Associate justice	March 15, 2004	May 19, 2022		
Rodrigo Lim Jr.	Associate justice	March 15, 2004	October 25, 2011		
Enrico Lanzanas	Associate justice	January 24, 2005	April 19, 2008		
Myrna Dimaranan- Vidal	Associate justice	January 24, 2005	December 20, 2009		
Normandie Pizarro	Associate justice	January 24, 2005	February 7, 2018	Early Retirement	
Apolinario Bruselas Jr.	Associate Justice	August 1, 2005	May 6, 2026		
Ramon Garcia	Associate justice	August 31, 2005	May 10, 2024		
Ricardo Rosario	Associate justice	September 12, 2005	October 8, 2020	Appointed Supreme Court justice	
Sixto Marella Jr.	Associate justice	May 4, 2006	February 1, 2010		
Antonio Villamor	Associate justice	May 4, 2006	July 4, 2012		
Agustin Dizon	Associate justice	May 4, 2006	June 24, 2008		
Marlene Gonzales-Sison	Associate Justice	May 8, 2006	February 28, 2026		
Romeo Barza	Associate justice	May 8, 2006	December 8, 2017		
Romeo Barza	Presiding justice	December 8, 2017	August 2, 2019		
Priscilla Baltazar-Padilla	Associate justice	May 31, 2006	July 16, 2020	Appointed Supreme Court justice	
Mario Lopez	Associate justice	May 31, 2006	December 3, 2019	Appointed Supreme Court justice	
Stephen Cruz	Associate justice	December 14, 2006	August 3, 2020		
Jane Aurora Lantion	Associate justice	December 14, 2006	January 28, 2020		
Francisco Acosta	Associate justice	December 14, 2006	April 2, 2017		
Michael Elbinias	Associate justice	December 14, 2006	November 26, 2014	Died November 26, 2014	
Elihu Ybañez	Associate justice	May 15, 2007	November 2, 2021		
Franchito Diamante	Associate justice	August 8, 2007	May 5, 2021	Died May 5, 2021	
Amy Lazaro-Javier	Associate justice	August 29, 2007	March 6, 2019	Appointed Supreme Court justice	
Florito Macalino	Associate justice	January 4, 2008	December 7, 2017	Died December 7, 2017	
Edgardo Lloren	Associate justice	January 4, 2008	August 8, 2021		
Ruben Ayson	Associate justice	May 5, 2008	March 2, 2011		
Edgardo Delos Santos	Associate justice	May 5, 2008	December 3, 2019	Appointed Supreme Court justice	
Rodil Zalameda	Associate justice	September 5, 2008	August 5, 2019	Appointed Supreme Court justice	
Leoncia Real-Dimagiba	Associate justice	June 15, 2009	December 1, 2017		
Samuel Gaerlan	Associate justice	June 15, 2009	January 8, 2020	Appointed Supreme Court justice	
Danton Bueser	Associate justice	June 15, 2009	March 4, 2021		
Manuel Barrios	Associate justice	June 15, 2009	November 29, 2022		
Agnes Reyes-Carpio	Associate justice	October 30, 2009	December 1, 2016		
Socorro Inting	Associate justice	October 30, 2009	April 17, 2018	Appointed Commission on Elections commissioner	
Angelita Alberto-Gacutan	Associate justice	October 30, 2009	December 3, 2013	Early Retirement	
Edwin Sorongon	Associate Justice	October 30, 2009	October 29, 2024		
Ramon Paul Hernando	Associate justice	February 16, 2010	October 10, 2018	Appointed Supreme Court justice	
Gabriel Ingles	Associate justice	February 23, 2011	February 27, 2022		
Victoria Isabel Paredes	Associate justice	March 1, 2011	July 1, 2024		
Pamela Ann Abella-Maxino	Associate justice	March 1, 2011	October 31, 2026		
Abraham Borreta	Associate justice	March 1, 2011	August 23, 2012	Died August 23, 2012	
Carmelita Salandanan-Manahan	Associate justice	March 15, 2011	March 22, 2019		
Melchor Quirino Sadang	Associate justice	March 15, 2011	January 6, 2017	Early retirement	
Ma. Luisa Padilla	Associate justice	May 17, 2012	January 18, 2020		
Jhosep Lopez	Associate justice	May 17, 2012	January 26, 2021	Appointed Supreme Court justice	
Renato Francisco	Associate justice	May 17, 2012	August 20, 2018		
Marie Christine Azcarraga-Jacob	Associate Justice	September 14, 2012	January 15, 2026		
Oscar Badelles	Associate justice	September 14, 2012	April 20, 2024	Retired	
Henri Jean Paul Inting	Associate justice	September 14, 2012	May 27, 2019	Appointed Supreme Court justice	
Edward Contreras	Associate justice	February 26, 2013	July 9, 2019		
Maria Filomena Singh	Associate justice	March 13, 2014	May 18, 2022	Appointed Supreme Court justice	
Rafael Antonio Santos	Associate justice	March 13, 2014	February 28, 2026	Early Retirement	
Perpetua Atal-Paño	Associate justice	November 6, 2015	September 30, 2026		
Loida Posadas-Kahulugan	Associate justice	June 11, 2018	January 19, 2023		
Evalyn Arellano-Morales	Associate Justice	June 19, 2018	February 2, 2026		
Dorothy P. Montejo Gonzaga	Associate justice	August 22, 2018	November 3, 2021	Early Retirement	
Alfredo Ampuan	Associate justice	July 8, 2019	June 3, 2024		
Jacinto Fajardo, Jr.	Associate justice	May 24, 2021	March 8, 2025		

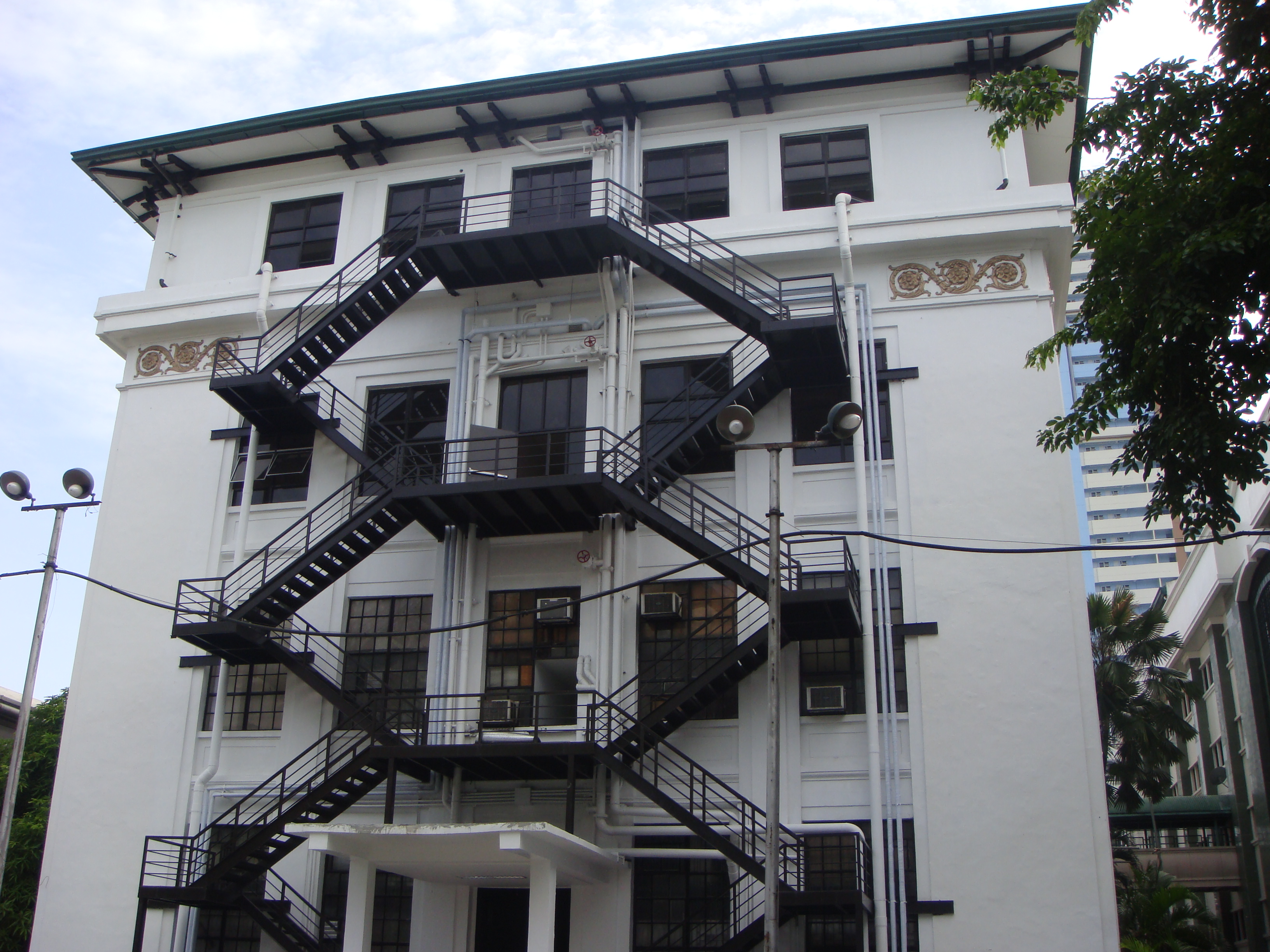
Back view of the Court

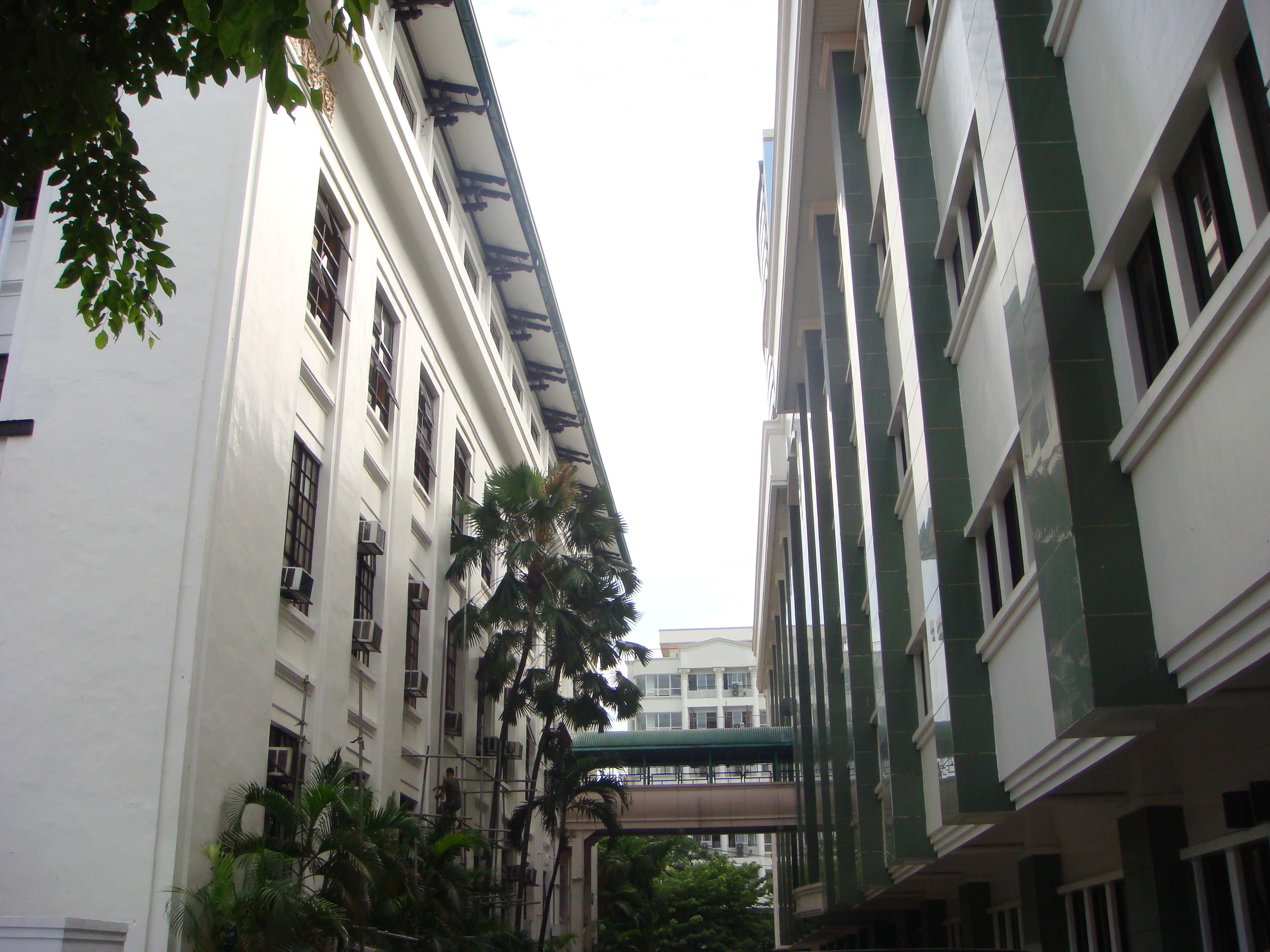
Old and new building

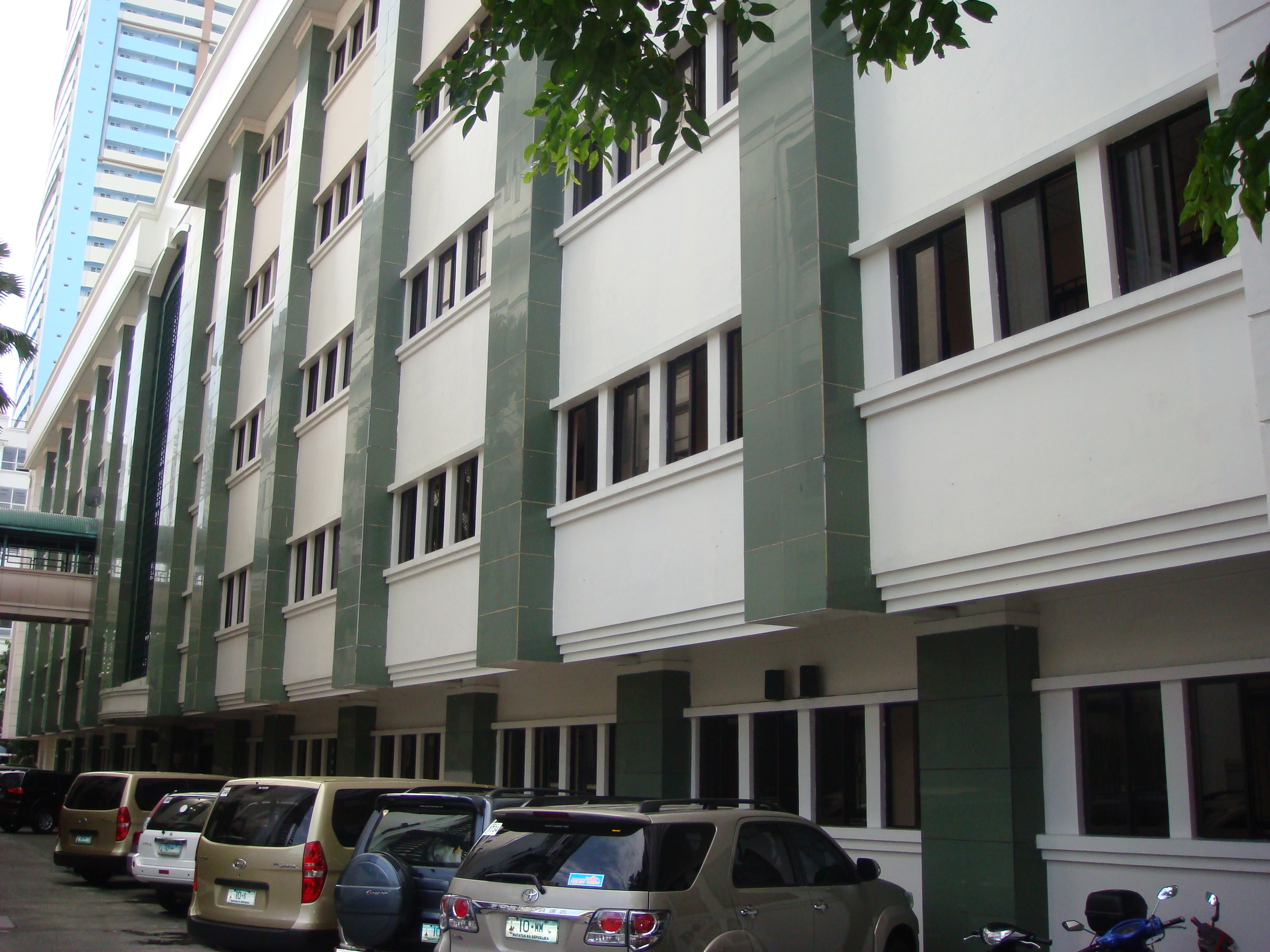
New (Annex) building

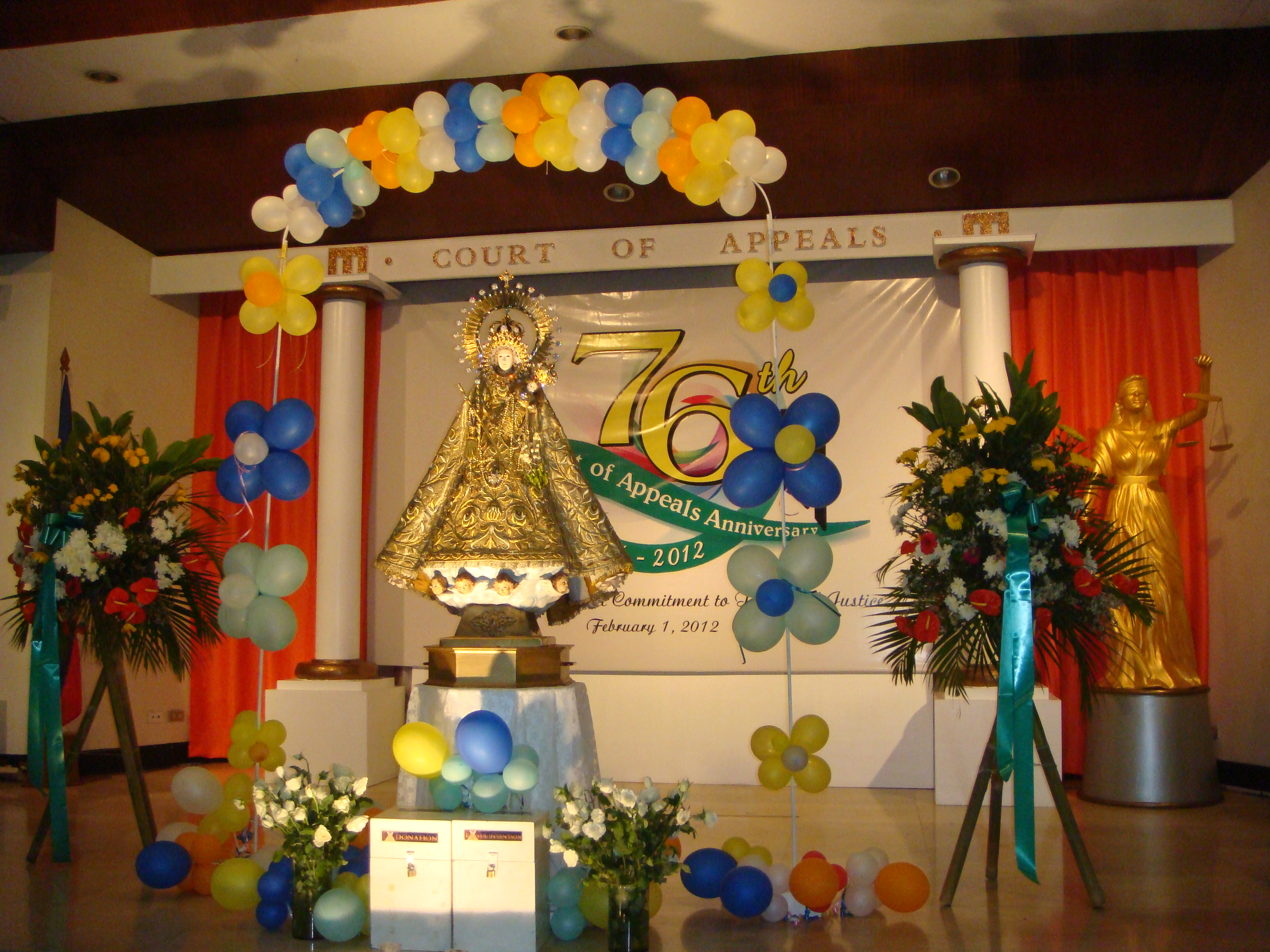
Our Lady of the Most Holy Rosary of La Naval de Manila at the 76th Anniversary of the Court of Appeals of the Philippines

== See also ==
- Chief Justice of the Supreme Court of the Philippines
- Court of Tax Appeals of the Philippines
- Sandiganbayan
- Philippines
- Political history of the Philippines
- Constitution of the Philippines
