= Anisah Amanodin-Umpa =

Filipino judge (born 1970)

The Honourable Anisah Amanodin-Umpa

Associate Justice of the Court of Appeals of the Philippines
- Incumbent
- Assumed office April 13, 2020
- Appointed by: Rodrigo Duterte
- Preceded by: Edward Contreras

Personal details
- Born: Anisah Bagul Amanodin; July 10, 1961 (age 65)
- Education: Mindanao State University

Anisah Bagul Amanodin-Umpa (born July 10, 1961) is a Filipino lawyer and jurist who is currently serving as an associate justice of the Court of Appeals of the Philippines. She succeeded Justice Henri Jean Paul Inting who was promoted to the Supreme Court on May 27, 2019.

== Early life and education ==
Amanodin-Umpa hails from Balindong, Lanao del Sur. She graduated cum laude from the Mindanao State University – Main Campus in Marawi City with a Bachelor of Science in Business Administration, major in Accountancy, and a Bachelor of Laws degree.

She passed the Certified Public Accountant licensure examinations in 1985 and the Philippine Bar examinations in 1990.

== Legal and academic career ==
Before entering the judiciary, Amanodin-Umpa worked as a professor of law at the Mindanao State University College of Law.

== Judicial career ==
Amanodin-Umpa began her judicial service as Clerk of Court V at the Municipal Trial Court of Iligan (2001–2009). She was then appointed as judge of the Regional Trial Court, where she served from 2009 to 2020.

She was later appointed Associate Justice of the Court of Appeals by President Rodrigo Duterte, becoming the first Moro woman to serve in the appellate court’s history.

Legal offices
Preceded by Edard Contreras	Court of Appeals Associate Justice; 2020–incumbent	Incumbent
