= Gabriel Robeniol =

Filipino judge (born 1961)

The Honourable Gabriel T. Robeniol
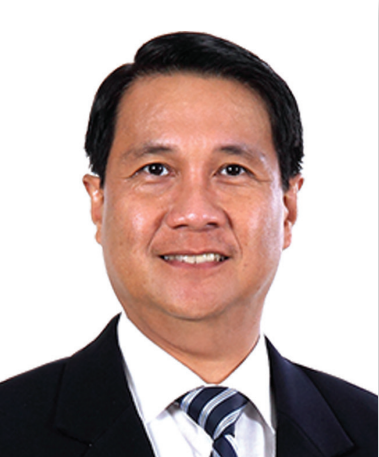

Associate Justice of the Court of Appeals of the Philippines
- Incumbent
- Assumed office November 6, 2015
- Appointed by: Benigno Aquino III
- Preceded by: Isiss Dicdican

Personal details
- Born: June 7, 1961 (age 65)
- Spouse: Anna Maria Rosario D. Robeniol
- Children: Abi Robeniol Chino Robeniol Yanni Robeniol
- Education: University of Santo Tomas

Gabriel T. Robeniol (born June 7, 1961) is an Associate Justice of the Court of Appeals of the Philippines. He was appointed to the Court of Appeals on November 6, 2015, by Benigno Aquino III.

== Early life and education ==
He was born on June 7, 1961.Robeniol earned a Bachelor of Arts degree in Economics from the University of Santo Tomas in 1982. He graduated magna cum laude from the UST Faculty of Civil Law in 1986 and passed the Philippine Bar Examination the same year.

== Early career ==
Robeniol began his legal career as an Associate Solicitor at the Office of the Solicitor General from 1987 to 1991. He later joined the law firm Feria Tantoco Robeniol Law Offices, advancing from Associate (1987) to Partner (1996) and eventually becoming a Name Partner in 2008. During his 27-year private practice, he handled civil, criminal, labor, maritime, insurance, tax, and corporate cases before courts and administrative bodies such as the Supreme Court of the Philippines, Court of Appeals of the Philippines, Sandiganbayan, Court of Tax Appeals of the Philippines, Regional Trial Court, and other tribunals and government agencies.

== Academic contributions ==
Robeniol has served as a Bar Reviewer and professor at the UST Faculty of Civil Law. He teaches Alternative dispute resolution and Intellectual property law. Since 1988, he has also instructed courses in Property law, Labor law, Administrative law, Public corporations, International law, Constitutional law, Political law, and Torts and damages. He is a lecturer for the Mandatory Continuing Legal Education program on Alternative Dispute Resolution.

== Sources ==
This article incorporates text from a free content work. Licensed under public domain as a work of the Philippine government. Text taken from PHILJA In Pursuit of Judicial Excellence, 18, Government of the Republic of the Philippines, Philippine Judicial Academy.
