= Apolinario Bruselas Jr. =

Filipino lawyer, jurist, and associate justice of the Court of Appeals

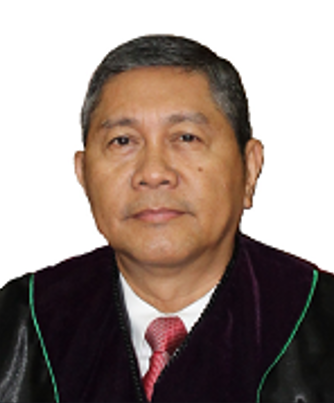

Associate Justice of the Court of Appeals of the Philippines
- In office August 1, 2005 – May 6, 2026
- Appointed by: Gloria Macapagal Arroyo
- Preceded by: Romeo Brawner Sr.

Personal details
- Born: May 6, 1956 (age 70)
- Spouse: Marie Angela P.M. Bruselas
- Children: 3
- Education: University of the Philippines (BA Economics, Bachelor of Laws)
- Profession: Lawyer, Judge, Jurist

Apolinario Dado Bruselas Jr. is a Filipino lawyer, jurist, and retired Associate Justice of the Court of Appeals of the Philippines. He was appointed to the appellate court by President Gloria Macapagal Arroyo on August 1, 2005.

Bruselas has been advocating since 2015 using the Filipino language in court, as opposed to English language, which has been used as the lingua franca for many years, because most criminal defendants in the Philippines only use a variety of Tagalog.

In 2019, Bruselas was on the short list for nomination to one of two vacancies for the Supreme Court of the Philippines, but President Duterte chose two other candidates. In 2023, Bruselas was also one of seven finalists for the Chief Judge of the Court of Appeals, but also was not chosen by Duterte. A defendant filed a complaint against Bruselas that the judge was late in providing relief to him, during the time when Brucelas was up for a promotion, which also occurred during the COVID-19 pandemic in the Philippines.
