= Walter S. Ong =

Filipino lawyer and jurist (born 1968)

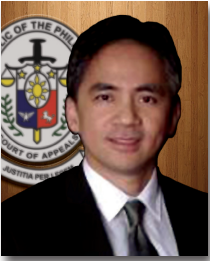

Associate Justice of the Court of Appeals of the Philippines
- Incumbent
- Assumed office November 28, 2017
- Preceded by: Noel Tijam

Personal details
- Education: De La Salle University (BSC in Accountancy); Ateneo de Manila University (JD); University of Pennsylvania (LLM)
- Profession: Lawyer, Judgea

Walter Santos Ong is a Filipino lawyer, accountant and jurist who has served as an Associate Justice of the Court of Appeals of the Philippines since 2017. He was appointed by President Rodrigo Duterte on November 28, 2017, succeeding Justice Noel G. Tijam who was elevated to the Supreme Court.

== Education ==
Ong earned his Bachelor of Science in Commerce, major in Accountancy, from De La Salle University, where he consistently made the Dean’s List. He placed 7th in the 1989 Certified Public Accountant Board Examinations with a rating of 90 percent.

He obtained his Juris Doctor degree from the Ateneo Law School, graduating with Second Honors and receiving the Silver Medal. After passing the 1993 Philippine Bar Examinations, he pursued further studies abroad and earned a Master of Laws degree from the University of Pennsylvania. He also passed the New York State Bar Examinations in 1997.

He is the younger brother of the dismissed Sandiganbayan associate justice, Gregory S. Ong.

== Legal career ==
Ong began his legal career with one of the major law firms in the Philippines, where he worked for five years before establishing his own practice. Prior to joining the judiciary, he was the Managing Partner of Ong Meneses Gonzalez & Gupit Law Offices, handling cases in litigation and arbitration, with focus areas in commercial and corporate law, civil law, criminal law, intellectual property, labor and employment relations, real estate transactions, and taxation.

== Judicial career ==
On November 28, 2017, President Rodrigo Duterte appointed Ong as Associate Justice of the Court of Appeals of the Philippines, filling the vacancy left by Justice Noel Tijam’s promotion to the Supreme Court.

== Sources ==
This article incorporates text from a free content work. Licensed under public domain as a work of the Philippine government. Text taken from PHILJA In Pursuit of Judicial Excellence, 16, Government of the Republic of the Philippines, Philippine Judicial Academy.
