= Carlito Calpatura =

Filipino jurist, lawyer

Carlito B. Calpatura
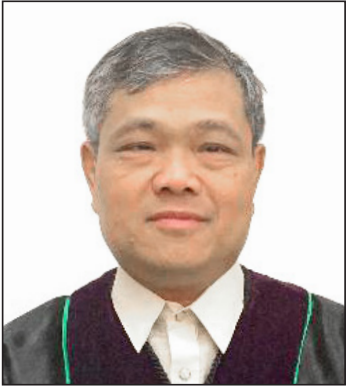

Associate Justice of the Court of Appeals of the Philippines
- Incumbent
- Assumed office July 8, 2019
- Preceded by: M. de Leon

Personal details
- Born: January 2, 1963 (age 63) Diffun, Quirino, Philippines
- Spouse: Atty. Margie G. Fernandez
- Children: Ariadna Mira, Jairus Carlo, Francis Dio, and Carla Margareth
- Education: Manuel L. Quezon University (AB, LLB)
- Profession: Lawyer, judge, academic

Carlito B. Calpatura (born January 2, 1963) is a Filipino lawyer, academic, and jurist who currently serves as an Associate Justice of the Court of Appeals of the Philippines. He was appointed to the appellate court on July 8, 2019, by President Rodrigo Duterte.

== Early life and education ==
Calpatura was born in Diffun, Quirino, on January 2, 1963. He completed his elementary education at San Antonio Elementary School and his secondary studies at Isabela State University in Echague, Isabela. He later earned a Bachelor of Arts in Political Science (1982) and a Bachelor of Laws (1987) from the Manuel L. Quezon University. He passed the Philippine Bar in 1988.

While in law school, he served as president of the MLQU Central Student Government and was involved with the MLQU Law Quarterly, the university's law journal. He was also a founding member of the Association of Law Journal Editors of the Philippines.

== Career ==
=== Legal practice and prosecution ===
After admission to the bar, Calpatura practiced litigation with the Gonzales Law Office and worked with Jesuit groups to provide legal aid to farmers and workers. In 1996, he joined the Department of Justice as a prosecutor, first in Dagupan City and later in Makati City. He rose to Prosecutor III (Second Assistant City Prosecutor) by 2005.

=== Judiciary ===
In March 2006, Calpatura was appointed judge of the Metropolitan Trial Court of Makati. He was later promoted to presiding judge of the Makati Regional Trial Court Branch 145 in September 2011, a position he held until his elevation to the Court of Appeals in July 2019.

During his tenure at the Makati RTC, he was elected president of the Makati Judges Association (2011–2013) and designated as second vice executive judge (2014–2016).

=== Academe and legal education ===
Calpatura has been active in teaching and training. Since 2010, he has served as a lecturer in Judicial Dispute Resolution at the Philippine Judicial Academy. He has also taught remedial law at the University of the Philippines College of Law and MLQU School of Law, and has been a Bar reviewer and MCLE lecturer in several institutions. He also contributed to the revision of the Rules of Civil Procedure as part of a Supreme Court subcommittee.

== Personal life ==
Calpatura is married to Atty. Margie G. Fernandez, Director at the Office of the Deputy Ombudsman for Luzon. They have four children: Ariadna Mira, Jairus Carlo, Francis Dio, and Carla Margareth.

== Sources ==
This article incorporates text from a free content work. Licensed under public domain as a work of the Philippine government. Text taken from In Pursuit of Judicial Excellence PHILJA, 13, Government of the Philippines. Philippine Judicial Academy.
