= Jesus Elbinias =

Jesus M. Elbinias

Presiding Justice of the Court of Appeals of the Philippines
- In office February 5, 1999 – October 15, 1999
- Appointed by: Joseph Estrada
- Preceded by: Arturo Buena
- Succeeded by: Jainal Rasul

Personal details
- Born: 1930
- Died: January 22, 2012 (aged 81–82)

Jesus M. Elbinias, was a Presiding Justice of the Philippine Court of Appeals and first Chancellor of the Department of Justice Academy. He is also remembered as the one who wrote and composed the Supreme Court Hymn, Judiciary Hymn, Ombudsman Hymn and the Court of Appeals Hymn. Justice Elbinias took his pre-law Associate of Arts degree and Bachelor of Laws degree from Silliman University.

== Biography ==
=== Early life ===
Justice Elbinias was born in Dulawan (now Datu Piang), Cotabato. He went to high school in Cotabato City and took his college and law degrees from Silliman University. While studying at Silliman, Justice Elbinias excelled in poetry, and in oratory, garnering awards such as Best Orator, Best Speaker and Best Debater in inter-collegiate contests.

=== Professional life ===
Elbinias entered the judiciary on January 30, 1976, as judge of the Court of First Instance in Palawan. He would later on be transferred to the Court of First Instance of Bulacan, and still later, reappointed as Regional Trial Judge in Makati. On January 31, 1987, the former President Corazon Aquino appointed him as Associate Justice of the Court of Appeals.

He served as Chairman of the Supreme Court E-Commerce Committee, and of the Technical Panel for Legal Education under the Commission on Higher Education (CHED). He was also appointed as member of the Board of Pardons and Parole, and as first chancellor of the Department of Justice Academy.

He was a member of the IBP Journal editorial board, a member of the governing board of the Institute of Judicial Administration, a member of the SCRA board of editorial consultants, Ateneo professor in Trial Technique and Criminal and Civil Procedures, remedial law lecturer at the University of the Philippines Law Center, awardee of the Professorial Chair in Law at Far Eastern University, professorial lecturer at the Philippine Judicial Academy, adviser of the Philippine Association of Law Professors, president of the Philippine Judicature Society, publisher of The Judicature News, and editor of the Trial Lawyers Magazine. He also served as bar examiner in three bar examinations and wrote the famous trial technique book called The Trial Complex: Multidisciplinary Approach to Courtroom Advocacy.

== See also ==
- Court of Appeals of the Philippines
- Silliman University College of Law
