= Perpetua Atal-Paño =

Filipino lawyer and associate justice of the Court of Appeals of the Philippines

Honorable Perpetua Susana Atal-Paño
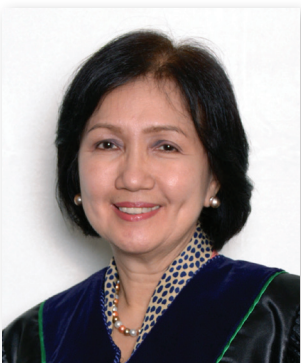

Associate Justice of the Court of Appeals of the Philippines
- Incumbent
- Assumed office November 6, 2015
- Preceded by: Hakim Abdulwahid

Personal details
- Born: Perpetua Susana Talay Atal; September 30, 1956 (age 70)
- Education: San Beda College of Law
- Profession: Lawyer, professor, judge

Perpetua Susana Atal-Paño (née Talay; born September 30, 1956) is a Filipino lawyer, legal educator, and jurist currently serving as an Associate Justice of the Court of Appeals of the Philippines. She was appointed to the appellate court on November 6, 2015, by President Benigno Aquino III.

== Early life and education ==
Atal-Paño is the eldest of seven children of lawyer Pablo Atal and Artemia Talay-Atal. She studied law at the San Beda College of Law, where she obtained her Bachelor of Laws degree. She also completed her undergraduate studies at St. Paul University Tuguegarao, which later recognized her as an Outstanding Paulinian Achiever (Centennial Awardee).

== Career ==
Atal-Paño began her government service as a Confidential Assistant at the Court of Appeals, later becoming a Supervising Staff member in the same court. She subsequently worked as a Court Attorney at the Supreme Court of the Philippines before joining the Department of Justice as State Counsel and later as State Prosecutor.

In 2000, she was appointed as Judge of the Metropolitan Trial Court of Makati, where she gained recognition for efficiently resolving a high volume of cases, earning the Commitment to Justice Award from the Rotary Club of Manila in 2005. She was later promoted to the Regional Trial Court of Makati, where she served for a decade and became Executive Judge.

On November 6, 2015, she was appointed as Associate Justice of the Court of Appeals of the Philippines.

== Academic career ==
Apart from her judicial service, Atal-Paño has taught at the San Beda College of Law and the University of Perpetual Help College of Law in Las Piñas. She has lectured on Criminal Procedure, Legal and Judicial Ethics, Agrarian Reform Law and Social Legislation, and Environmental Law and Natural Resources.

== Awards and recognition ==
- Commitment to Justice Award (2005), Rotary Club of Manila
- Outstanding Paulinian Achiever (Centennial Awardee), St. Paul University of Tuguegarao

== Sources ==
This article incorporates text from a free content work. Licensed under public domain as a work of the Philippine government. Text taken from PHILJA In Pursuit of Judicial Excellence, 18, Government of the Republic of the Philippines, Philippine Judicial Academy.
