= Tita Marilyn Payoyo-Villordon =

Filipino lawyer and jurist

Associate Justice Tita Marilyn B. Payoyo-Villordon
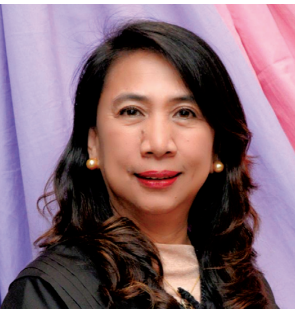

Associate Justice of the Court of Appeals of the Philippines
- Incumbent
- Assumed office June 28, 2017
- Preceded by: Francisco Acosta

Personal details
- Born: September 16, 1959 (age 67) Baguio City, Philippines
- Spouse: Rafael R. Villordon
- Children: 3
- Education: Baguio Colleges Foundation (now University of the Cordilleras)
- Profession: Lawyer, Judge

Tita Marilyn Bautista Payoyo-Villordon (born September 16, 1959) is a Filipino lawyer and jurist who has served as an Associate Justice of the Court of Appeals of the Philippines since 2017. She was appointed to the appellate court by President Rodrigo Duterte on June 28, 2017.

== Early life and education ==
Payoyo-Villordon was born in Baguio to Judge Tito A. Payoyo and Hilaria Bautista-Payoyo. She is the eldest among their children.

She earned her law degree from the Baguio Colleges Foundation (now University of the Cordilleras). Before entering law, she also taught at the Union Christian College, the Philippine Military Academy, and the Baguio Colleges Foundation.

== Career ==
Payoyo-Villordon first worked in the public sector as a Department Prosecutor at the Department of Agriculture in 1987, later joining the National Power Corporation (NAPOCOR) where she became Division Manager of the Board of Inquiry and Discipline. She also served as a Legislative Staff Officer at the House of Representatives.

In May 2001, she joined the judiciary as Presiding Judge of the Municipal Trial Court in Cities (MTCC) of Olongapo City. She later served as Acting Presiding Judge of the Metropolitan Trial Courts in Mandaluyong (Branch 59) and Pasay (Branch 45). In 2004, she was promoted as Presiding Judge of the Regional Trial Court (RTC) Branch 224 of Quezon City, where she served for 13 years until her appointment to the Court of Appeals.

She is also active in judicial associations, serving as Treasurer of the Philippine Women Judges Association (PWJA) and President of the Quezon City RTC Judges Association at the time of her CA appointment.

== International involvement ==
Payoyo-Villordon represented the Philippine judiciary in several international conferences, including events of the International Association of Women Judges (IAWJ) held in Washington D.C., Seoul, Auckland, Sydney, and Arusha. She also participated in regional conferences of the ASEAN Law Association and the OECD Competition Workshop for Judges in Busan, Korea.

== Recognition ==
She was recognized twice as an Outstanding Judge by the Volunteers Against Crime and Corruption (2007 and 2014), and received commendations from the Philippine Drug Enforcement Agency for her efficient case disposition.

== Personal life ==
She is married to Quezon City Prosecutor Rafael R. Villordon. They have three children: Labor Arbiter Loverhette Jeffrey, Atty. Barwin Scott, and Atty. Kathleen Stacey.

== Sources ==
This article incorporates text from a free content work. Licensed under public domain as a work of the Philippine government. Text taken from PHILJA In Pursuit of Judicial Excellence, 14, Government of the Republic of the Philippines, Philippine Judicial Academy.
