= Snooky Maria Ana Bareno-Sagayo =

Filipino jurist and Associate Justice of the Court of Appeals

The Honorable Snooky Maria Ana Bareno-Sagayo
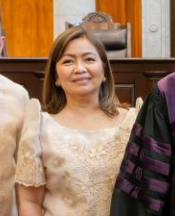

Associate Justice of the Court of Appeals
- Incumbent
- Assumed office September 23, 2025
- Appointed by: Bongbong Marcos
- Preceded by: Jacinto G. Fajardo, Jr.

Presiding Judge of the RTC Branch 283, Valenzuela City
- In office March 8, 2016 – September 23, 2025
- Preceded by: Court Created
- Succeeded by: Vacant

Judge of the Municipal Trial Court of Pandi Bulacan
- In office December 2, 2010 – March 8, 2016
- Appointed by: Benigno Aquino III
- Preceded by: Hon. Aznar D. Lindayag
- Succeeded by: Hon. Bienvenido Almonte, Jr.

Personal details
- Born: December 29, 1967 (age 58)
- Education: San Beda University (LL.B.)
- Occupation: Jurist
- Profession: Lawyer

Snooky Maria Ana Bareno-Sagayo (born December 29, 1967) is a Filipino lawyer and jurist serving as an Associate Justice of the Court of Appeals since 2025.

== Education ==
Sagayo earned her law degree from San Beda University in 1992. She was admitted to the Philippine Bar in 1994.

== Career ==
From 1994 to 2010, Sagayo worked in various offices within the Philippine Judiciary, including the Court of Appeals, the Presidential Electoral Tribunal, and the Supreme Court of the Philippines.

In 2010, she was appointed Presiding Judge of the Municipal Trial Court in Pandi, Bulacan, serving until 2016. She was later appointed Judge of Branch 283 of the Regional Trial Court in Valenzuela City, where she served from 2016 until her elevation to the appellate court.

On September 23, 2025, President Bongbong Marcos appointed Sagayo as Associate Justice of the Court of Appeals, succeeding Associate Justice Jacinto G. Fajardo Jr., who retired earlier that year.
