= Jacinto Fajardo Jr. =

Filipino jurist and Associate Justice of the Court of Appeals (born 1955)

The Honorable Jacinto Gavino Fajardo Jr.
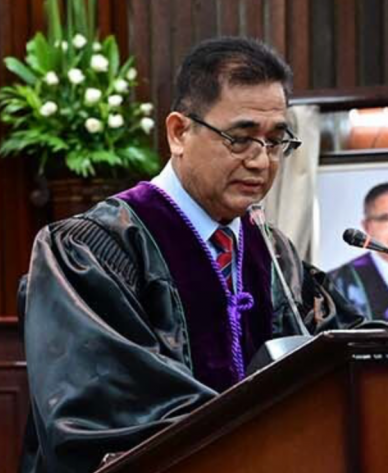

Associate Justice of the Court of Appeals
- In office January 28, 2022 – March 7, 2025
- Appointed by: Rodrigo Duterte
- Preceded by: Rodil Zalameda
- Succeeded by: Snooky Ana Maria Bareno-Sagayo

Presiding Judge of the Regional Trial Court of Talisay City, Cebu, Branch 66
- In office September 6, 2013 – January 28, 2022
- Appointed by: Benigno Aquino III
- Preceded by: Seat Created
- Succeeded by: Joy Angelica Santos-Doctor

Personal details
- Born: March 7, 1955 (age 71) Gubat, Sorsogon, Philippines
- Education: San Beda University (LLB)
- Occupation: Jurist
- Profession: Lawyer

Jacinto Gavino Fajardo Jr. (born March 7, 1955) is a Filipino lawyer and jurist who served as an associate justice of the Court of Appeals of the Philippines from January 28, 2022 until his retirement on March 6, 2025. Prior to his appointment to the appellate court, he served as presiding judge of the Regional Trial Court of Talisay City, Cebu.

== Early life and education ==
Fajardo is a native of Gubat, Sorsogon, Philippines. He earned his law degree from San Beda University and passed the Philippine Bar Examination in 1985.

== Judicial career ==
Before joining the appellate court, Fajardo served in the Judiciary of the Philippines in various capacities. He became presiding judge of the Regional Trial Court in Talisay City, Cebu, serving from 2016 to 2022.

In 2022, he was appointed Associate Justice of the Court of Appeals, filling the vacancy created by the elevation of Associate Justice Rodil Zalameda to the Supreme Court of the Philippines.

Fajardo served as a senior member of the Court of Appeals' 19th Division until reaching the mandatory retirement age of 70 in 2025.

== Retirement ==
On March 6, 2025, the Court of Appeals held a special en banc session in honor of Fajardo's retirement and 70th birthday. During the ceremony, Alexander Gesmundo, chief justice of the Philippines, praised Fajardo's dedication, integrity, and service to the judiciary.

The ceremony included the presentation of judicial tokens and the unveiling of Fajardo's official portrait. Retired chief justice Diosdado Peralta also attended the event.
