= Ruben Reynaldo Roxas =

Filipino lawyer and associate justice of the Court of Appeals of the Philippines

Associate Justice Ruben Reynaldo G. Roxas
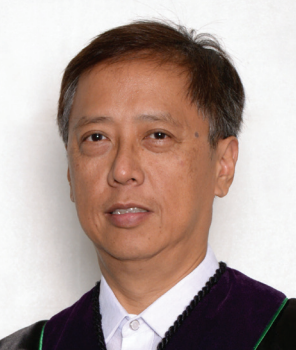

Associate Justice of the Court of Appeals of the Philippines
- Incumbent
- Assumed office November 6, 2015
- Preceded by: Michael Elbinas

Personal details
- Born: March 30, 1962 (age 64) Philippines
- Education: Saint Louis University (Philippines) San Beda College of Law
- Profession: Lawyer, professor, judge

Ruben Reynaldo G. Roxas (born March 30, 1962) is a Filipino lawyer, professor, and jurist who currently serves as an Associate Justice of the Court of Appeals of the Philippines. He was appointed to the appellate court on November 6, 2015, by President Benigno Aquino III.

== Early life and education ==
Roxas studied political science at Saint Louis University, Baguio, graduating in 1982. He then earned his Bachelor of Laws degree from the San Beda College of Law in 1986, the same year he passed the Philippine Bar Examinations.

== Career ==
Roxas began his judicial career in 1987 as a Legal Research Attorney for the Pasig Regional Trial Court. Later that year, he transferred to the Office of the Solicitor General as Associate Solicitor, serving until 1991.

He moved to the private sector, working as Legal Counsel and Assistant Corporate Secretary for Coca-Cola Bottlers Philippines, Inc. from 1991 to 2002. After a brief period in private law practice, he joined the judiciary once again in 2003 when he was appointed Presiding Judge of the Metropolitan Trial Court of Manila, Branch 28.

In 2006, he was promoted to Presiding Judge of the Regional Trial Court (RTC) of Manila, Branch 12, and also served as Acting Presiding Judge of RTC Manila, Branch 52. He was later designated Second Vice Executive Judge of RTC Manila in 2014.

On November 6, 2015, President Aquino appointed him as Associate Justice of the Court of Appeals of the Philippines.

== Awards and recognition ==
- Outstanding RTC Judge of Manila (2013)
- Special Citation for Government Service, San Beda College of Law Alumni Association (2014)

== Academic career ==
Roxas has facilitated Judicial Dispute Resolution (JDR) seminars for the Philippine Judicial Academy and served as Director for Manila of the Philippine Judges Association for two consecutive terms.

== Personal life ==
Roxas is married to Atty. Silvina Q. Mamaril-Roxas. They have three daughters: Rosanne Veronica, Rissa Vida, and Rachel Vivien.

== Sources ==
This article incorporates text from a free content work. Licensed under public domain as a work of the Philippine government. Text taken from PHILJA In Pursuit of Judicial Excellence, 18, Government of the Republic of the Philippines, Philippine Judicial Academy.
