= Angelene Mary Quimpo-Sale =

Associate Justice Angelene Mary Quimpo-Sale
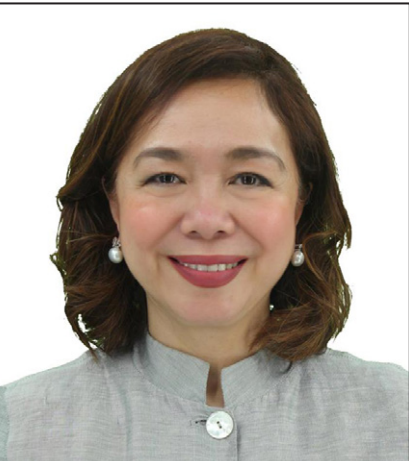

Associate Justice of the Court of Appeals of the Philippines
- Incumbent
- Assumed office July 8, 2019
- Preceded by: Renato Francisco

Personal details
- Born: January 26, 1963 (age 63)
- Education: University of the Philippines (AB Psychology, 1983; LL.B., 1989)
- Occupation: Lawyer, judge

Angelene Mary Willkom Quimpo-Sale (born January 26, 1963) is a Filipino jurist currently serving as an Associate Justice of the Court of Appeals of the Philippines. She was appointed to the appellate court on July 8, 2019, by President Rodrigo Duterte.

== Early life and education ==
Quimpo-Sale studied psychology at the University of the Philippines Diliman, earning her bachelor's degree in 1983. She later obtained her Bachelor of Laws from the UP College of Law in 1989 and was admitted to the Philippine Bar in 1990.

== Judicial career ==
She began her legal career as a law clerk to several appellate and Supreme Court justices, including Vicente V. Mendoza, Consuelo Ynares-Santiago, Camilo Quiason, and future Chief Justice Reynato Puno.

In October 2002, Quimpo-Sale was appointed Presiding Judge of Quezon City Metropolitan Trial Court (MeTC) Branch 32. In August 2007, she was designated Presiding Judge of Quezon City Regional Trial Court (RTC) Branch 106, where she oversaw pilot projects such as the Automated Hearing System and the Continuous Trial System for criminal cases.

In 2014, the Supreme Court named her to the Committee on Family Courts and Juvenile Concerns to help implement the Family Courts Act of 1997.

Quimpo-Sale was appointed Associate Justice of the Court of Appeals on July 8, 2019.

== Advocacy and achievements ==
As a trial court judge, she received the Judicial Excellence Award twice: Most Outstanding Judge for First Level Courts in 2006, and the Chief Justice Cayetano Arellano Award for Most Outstanding Judge for Second Level Courts in 2014. She also twice received the Most Outstanding Family Court Judge Award from the Rotary Club of Metro Sta. Mesa, Quezon City.

She has represented the Philippines in the International Hague Network of Judges since 2018 and has participated in numerous international conferences concerning family law, children's rights, and gender justice.

In 2015, the Quezon City Council passed a resolution commending her advocacy for women and children's welfare.

== Sources ==
This article incorporates text from a free content work. Licensed under public domain as a work of the Philippine government. Text taken from Knowledge Sharing on the Modernization of Criminal Law, Government of the Philippines. Philippine Judicial Academy.
