= Lily Biton =

The Honorable Lily Villareal Biton
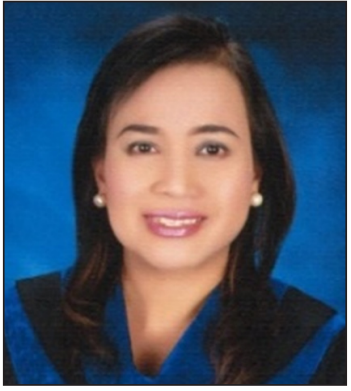

Associate Justice of the Court of Appeals of the Philippines
- Incumbent
- Assumed office July 8, 2019
- Preceded by: Jose Reyes Jr.

Personal details
- Born: October 14, 1961 (age 64) Philippines
- Education: Central Philippine University (B.Sc., LL.B.) University of Santo Tomas (LL.M. units)
- Profession: Judge, lawyer, military officer

Lily Villareal Biton (born October 14, 1961) is a Filipino lawyer, academic, and jurist who currently serves as an Associate Justice of the Court of Appeals of the Philippines. She was appointed to the appellate court on July 8, 2019, by President Rodrigo Duterte, filling the vacancy left by Associate Justice Jose Reyes Jr., who had been elevated to the Supreme Court.

== Early life and education ==
Biton studied at Central Philippine University in Iloilo City, where she obtained a Bachelor of Science in Biology in 1982 and a Bachelor of Laws in 1986. She later earned 33 academic units toward a Master of Laws degree at the University of Santo Tomas. She also completed the Course on Court Management Development in Sydney and Adelaide, Australia, under a program sponsored by the Supreme Court of the Philippines and the Philippines–Australia Human Resource Development Facility.

== Career ==
Biton began her legal career in 1987 as a Senior Attorney at the Sandiganbayan. She subsequently served as Court Attorney and Executive Clerk of Court III of the same tribunal.

In 2009, she was appointed as Presiding Judge of the Regional Trial Court, Branch 77, San Mateo–Rodriguez, Rizal, and later became the Executive Judge of the same court. While serving in the judiciary, she also taught at the College of Law of the Philippine Christian University and the University of Perpetual Help System DALTA.

On July 8, 2019, President Duterte appointed Biton as Associate Justice of the Court of Appeals. She formally took her oath on July 10, 2019, before Associate Justice Diosdado Peralta at the Supreme Court in Manila.

== Other roles ==
Apart from her judicial career, Biton has been active in civic, religious, and military service. She is a commissioned officer with the rank of Lieutenant Colonel in the Armed Forces of the Philippines Reserve Command (AFPRESCOM). A long-time Sunday school teacher and Christian volunteer, she served for over a decade at the Correctional Institution for Women in Mandaluyong City.

Biton has also been a broadcaster on AFP Radio DWDD 1134 AM, focusing on legal issues, and a songwriter who authored the lyrics of the Sandiganbayan Hymn. She was a former member of the Board of Trustees of the Central Philippine University Alumni Association, Inc. and keynote speaker at the university’s 89th Commencement Exercises in 2016.

== Awards and recognition ==
Biton has received numerous awards, including:

- Chief Justice Award for Outstanding Service in the Judiciary
- Distinguished Centralian Award in Government Service/Judiciary
- Most Outstanding Alumna Award, CPU College of Arts and Science
- Military Civic Action Medal
- Military Commendation Medal
- *Parangal sa Kapanalig ng Sandatahang Lakas ng Pilipinas*
- Award of Reservist Katapatan Lapu-Lapu Badge

== Sources ==
This article incorporates text from a free content work. Licensed under public domain as a work of the Philippine government. Text taken from In Pursuit of Judicial Excellence PHILJA, 14, Government of the Philippines. Philippine Judicial Academy.
