= Florencio Mamauag Jr. =

Associate Justice Florencio M. Mamauag Jr.
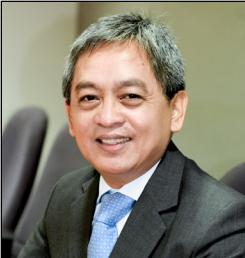

Associate Justice of the Court of Appeals of the Philippines
- Incumbent
- Assumed office August 22, 2018
- Preceded by: Florito Macalino

Personal details
- Born: Cabagan, Isabela, Philippines
- Education: San Beda College (now San Beda University); Arellano University
- Profession: Lawyer, Certified Public Accountant, Professor

Florencio Mallanao Mamauag Jr. is a Filipino lawyer, academic, and jurist who currently serves as an Associate Justice of the Court of Appeals of the Philippines.

== Early life and education ==
Mamauag was born in Cabagan, Isabela, to Atty. Florencio B. Mamauag Sr. and Rosalina F. Mallanao, both public servants. He earned his Bachelor of Science in Commerce, major in Accountancy, and Bachelor of Laws at the San Beda College in Manila (now San Beda University). He later became a Certified Public Accountant.

== Career ==
Mamauag began his professional career as an Associate Auditor at Sycip Gorres Velayo & Company (SGV), and later worked as an Examiner at the Securities and Exchange Commission. After completing his law degree and passing the Bar, he worked as an Associate Attorney in a private Makati law office.

He subsequently joined the government as a State Corporate Attorney at the Office of the Government Corporate Counsel (OGCC), where he served for four years. Afterward, he transitioned to the private sector and rose to become Vice President, Group Head of Legal, Corporate Secretary, and Compliance Officer of a publicly listed group of companies engaged in sugar, bio-ethanol fuel, and power generation.

== Academic career ==
Mamauag has been a Professor of Law at the College of Law of San Beda University, teaching Corporate Law and Labor Law. He also teaches Labor Law at the Arellano University Foundation School of Law and is a Bar Reviewer in Labor Law at the San Beda University Bar Review School.

== Sources ==
This article incorporates text from a free content work. Licensed under public domain as a work of the Philippine government. Text taken from PHILJA In Pursuit of Judicial Excellence, 17, Government of the Republic of the Philippines, Philippine Judicial Academy.
