= Alfredo Ampuan =

Associate Justice Alfredo D. Ampuan
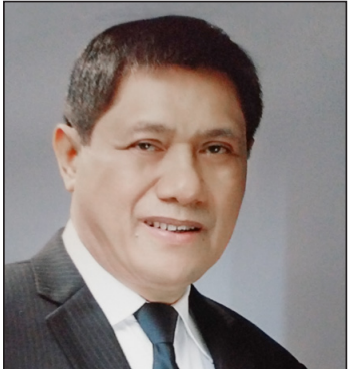

Associate Justice of the Court of Appeals of the Philippines
- In office July 8, 2019 – June 2, 2024
- Succeeded by: Emilio Rodolfo Y. Legaspi III

Personal details
- Born: Alfredo D. Ampuan; June 2, 1954 (age 72)
- Education: University of Nueva Caceres (LL.B.); University of Santo Tomas (LL.M. units); University of Eastern Philippines (B.S. Agricultural Engineering)
- Profession: Lawyer, judge, academic, teacher

Alfredo D. Ampuan (born June 2, 1954) is a Filipino lawyer and jurist from Samar who served as an Associate Justice of the Court of Appeals of the Philippines from July 8, 2019 until June 3, 2024. His retirement was at The Manila hotel.

== Education ==
Ampuan obtained his Bachelor of Laws degree from the University of Nueva Caceres in 1992 and earned Master of Laws units from the University of Santo Tomas. He earlier graduated with a Bachelor of Science degree in Agricultural Engineering from the University of Eastern Philippines.

== Career ==
Before joining the judiciary, Ampuan worked as a Public Attorney, Prosecutor in the Department of Justice in Manila and Naga City, and Special Prosecutor/Hearing Officer at the Bureau of Immigration and Deportation.

He served as Presiding Judge of the Metropolitan Trial Court of Quezon City, Branch 33 (2005–2011), and later as Presiding Judge of the Regional Trial Court of Manila, Branch 40 (2011–2019). On July 8, 2019, he was appointed Associate Justice of the Court of Appeals by President Rodrigo Duterte.

In addition to his judicial service, he was Academic Dean of Mariners Polytechnic Colleges from 1987 to 1992, and taught at the College of Law of the University of Eastern Philippines. Ampuan has also attended international seminars and trainings, including those conducted by the World Jurist Association in Los Angeles, California, on immigration, migration, and the rule of law.

=== Inhibition from Atio Castillo hazing case ===
In March 2018, while serving as Presiding Judge of the Regional Trial Court of Manila, Branch 40, Ampuan recused himself from the case against members of the Aegis Juris Fraternity who were facing charges under the Anti-Hazing Law in connection with the death of University of Santo Tomas law student Horacio "Atio" Castillo III.

Although he noted that allegations of bias alone are generally insufficient grounds for inhibition, Ampuan decided to grant the motion for his recusal in order to dispel doubts about the court's impartiality. The motion had been filed by two of the accused, who cited his family connection to anti-crime advocate Dante Jimenez of the Volunteers Against Crime and Corruption. Following his inhibition, the case was reassigned to another trial court branch.

== Sources ==
This article incorporates text from a free content work. Licensed under public domain as a work of the Philippine government. Text taken from In Pursuit of Judicial Excellence PHILJA, 13, Government of the Philippines. Philippine Judicial Academy.
