= Geraldine Fiel-Macaraig =

Filipino lawyer and jurist

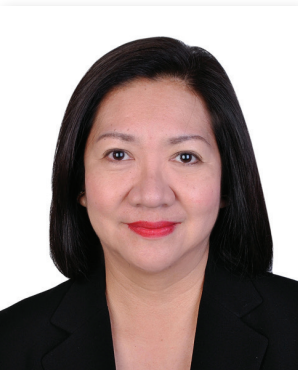

Associate Justice of the Court of Appeals of the Philippines
- Incumbent
- Assumed office November 6, 2015
- Preceded by: Rebecca De Guia-Salvador

Personal details
- Born: March 25, 1963 (age 63)
- Education: University of the Philippines Diliman
- Profession: Lawyer, Judge, Jurist

Geraldine C. Fiel-Macaraig (born March 25, 1963) is a Filipino jurist and incumbent Associate Justice of the Court of Appeals of the Philippines. She was appointed by President Benigno Aquino III on November 6, 2015.

== Education ==
Fiel-Macaraig obtained her Bachelor of Science in Business Administration in 1983 and her Bachelor of Laws degrees from the University of the Philippines Diliman in 1987.

== Career ==
In November 1987, she began her career in government service as Legislative Staff Officer VI at the Reference and Research Bureau of the House of Representatives. In 1989, she transferred to the Office of the Solicitor General (OSG), where she served for twelve years handling cases for the government, its agencies, and instrumentalities before trial courts, the Court of Appeals, and the Supreme Court. She also served as president of the OSG Ladies’ Circle from 1994 to 1995.

In August 2001, she was appointed presiding judge of the Regional Trial Court, Branch 192, Marikina City. In December 2009, her sala was designated as one of the two Family Courts in Marikina City. She also served as Executive Judge of her station for two terms (2007–2011), and again in March 2014 until her appointment to the Court of Appeals.

== Judicial work and training ==
Aside from her judicial duties, Justice Fiel-Macaraig has been a trainer in various Competency Enhancement Training (CET) Seminar-Workshops for judges and court personnel, including CET on cases involving children, CET on Trafficking in Persons, and Gender Sensitivity Training, all under the auspices of the Philippine Judicial Academy (PHILJA).

She is also a member of the Technical Working Group of the Supreme Court Committee on Family Courts. She previously served on the Subcommittee of the Society for Judicial Excellence in the Search for Outstanding Clerks of Court in 2013 and 2015.

== Awards ==
In recognition of her service, the Society for Judicial Excellence awarded her the Chief Justice Jose Abad Santos Award as Outstanding Regional Trial Court Judge in the Philippines in 2012.

== Sources ==
This article incorporates text from a free content work. Licensed under public domain as a work of the Philippine government. Text taken from PHILJA In Pursuit of Judicial Excellence, 18, Government of the Republic of the Philippines, Philippine Judicial Academy.
