= Ronaldo Roberto Martin =

Honorable Ronaldo Roberto Martin
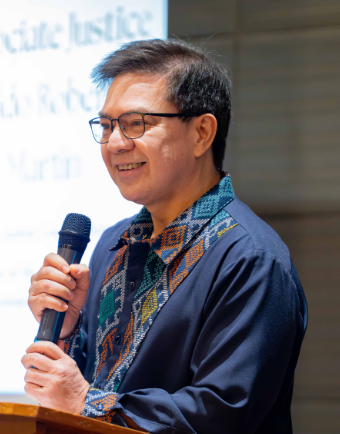

Associate Justice of the Court of Appeals of the Philippines
- Incumbent
- Assumed office May 5, 2015
- Preceded by: Justice Vicente Veloso III

Personal details
- Born: Ronaldo Roberto Baquizal Martin; October 8, 1964 (age 61) Philippines
- Education: Ateneo de Manila University (BA Economics, JD)
- Profession: Lawyer, Professor, Judge

Ronaldo Roberto Baquizal Martin (born October 8, 1964) is a Filipino lawyer, educator, and jurist who has been serving as an Associate Justice of the Court of Appeals of the Philippines since May 5, 2015.

== Early life and education ==
Martin completed his primary and secondary education at the Ateneo de Manila University. He later obtained a Bachelor of Arts degree in economics in 1986 and a Juris Doctor degree in 1991 from the same institution.

== Career ==
Martin's professional career spans legal, academic, and public service roles. He began as a teacher for Tulong Dunong at Ateneo de Manila University High School (1986–1987), then worked as a scriptwriter for Street Pulse, a political magazine talk show (1987–1988). From 1988 to 1992, he served as a Legislative Liaison Officer at the Office of Senator Rene A.V. Saguisag. In 1992, he became Project Coordinator for the Presidential Elections at the Philippine Pastoral Council for Responsible Voting (PPCRV) under Fr. Tito Caluag, S.J.

He also served as legal counsel for the Congressional Commission on Health (Healthcom) and for labor cases at the Sentro ng Alternatibong Lingap Pangligal (SALIGAN) (1992–1993). From 1992 to 1993, he worked as labor lawyer at the National Union for Workers in Hotels, Restaurants and Allied Industries (NUWHRAIN). Later, he served as legal counsel and consultant for the International Labour Organization (ILO) in 1997 and became part of the Ad Hoc Independent Citizen's Committee to investigate the Philippine Centennial Projects in 1999.

Martin also taught Obligations and Contracts and Insurance Law at the College of Business and Economics, De La Salle University (2003–2005).

=== Judicial career ===
To prepare for judicial service, Martin joined the Office of the Solicitor General as Associate Solicitor I, II, and III from 1993 to 2005. In 2005, he was appointed Presiding Judge of the Regional Trial Court Branch 73 in Antipolo City. He later became Vice Executive Judge (2007–2011) and Executive Judge (2011–2015).

On May 5, 2015, President Benigno Aquino III appointed Martin as Associate Justice of the Court of Appeals of the Philippines.

== Seminars and publications ==
Martin has attended several international legal seminars and trainings, including the ASEAN-Japan International Seminar on Copyright and the Special Course on Intellectual Property Rights and Neighboring Rights in Japan. He also joined the World Congress on Labor and Social Security at the University of Buenos Aires in 1997.

He has authored publications, one of which was shortlisted for the National Book Awards in 2008. In 2001, his essay won the grand prize in a government workers' essay-writing contest organized by the GSIS Journal, Office of the Solicitor General.

== Sources ==
This article incorporates text from a free content work. Licensed under public domain as a work of the Philippine government. Text taken from PHILJA In Pursuit of Judicial Excellence, 16, Government of the Republic of the Philippines, Philippine Judicial Academy.
