= Ramon Bato Jr. =

Filipino lawyer, jurist, associate justice of the Court of Appeals

Ramon L. Bato Jr.

Associate Justice of the Court of Appeals of the Philippines
- Incumbent
- Assumed office March 15, 2004
- Preceded by: Teodoro Regino

Personal details
- Born: August 27, 1958 (age 68) Philippines
- Education: Silliman University (LLB)
- Occupation: Jurist, lawyer
- Known for: Dacer–Corbito case ruling; Cyber libel case involving Maria Ressa

Ramon Layugan Bato Jr. (born August 27, 1958) is a Filipino lawyer and jurist who currently serves as an Associate Justice of the Court of Appeals of the Philippines. He was appointed to the appellate court on March 15, 2004, by President Gloria Macapagal-Arroyo.

== Early life and education ==
Bato obtained his law degree from Silliman University.

== Career ==
=== Early career ===
Before his appointment to the Court of Appeals, Bato worked as a court attorney at the Supreme Court of the Philippines and later became a trial court judge in Imus, Cavite, and in Dumaguete City. While at the Supreme Court, he co-founded the Supreme Court Assembly of Lawyer-Employees*(SCALE) and served as its first vice president and later as president.

=== Court of Appeals ===
Bato was appointed Associate Justice of the Court of Appeals on March 15, 2004, by President Gloria Macapagal-Arroyo. He currently chairs the Court's Second Division.

He is notable for writing the decision that dismissed the double murder case against former police chief and senator Panfilo Lacson in the Dacer–Corbito case.

Bato was part of the Court of Appeals division, alongside Associate Justices Roberto Quiroz and Germano Francisco Legaspi, that denied the motion for reconsideration filed by Maria Ressa and Reynaldo Santos Jr. in their cyber libel case in October 2022. The decision upheld their conviction, with the court ruling that the arguments raised had already been "exhaustively resolved and discussed."

=== Supreme Court nomination ===
In May 2011, Bato was among 20 nominees interviewed by the Judicial and Bar Council (JBC) to fill the upcoming vacancies in the Supreme Court of the Philippines following the retirement of Associate Justices Antonio Eduardo Nachura and Conchita Carpio-Morales. During his interview, then-Chief Justice Renato Corona, who chaired the JBC, pressed Bato on constitutional law issues and advised him to "brush up on constitutional law" after his responses on the separation of powers.
