= Pablito Perez =

Honorable Pablito Perez
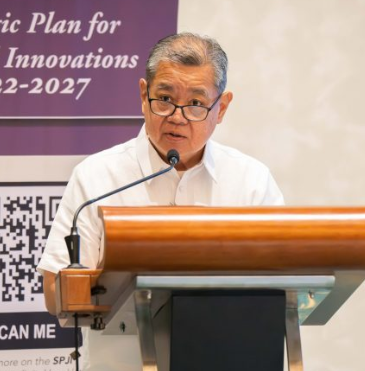

Associate Justice of the Court of Appeals of the Philippines
- Incumbent
- Assumed office March 13, 2014
- Preceded by: Angelita Alberto-Gacutan

Personal details
- Born: Pablo Alhambra Perez; January 15, 1957 (age 69)
- Education: Ateneo de Manila University (A.B. Philosophy) San Beda College of Law (LL.B., valedictorian) University of Pennsylvania (LL.M.)

Pablito Alhambra Perez (born January 15, 1957) is a Filipino lawyer and jurist who currently serves as an Associate Justice of the Court of Appeals of the Philippines since March 13, 2014.

== Early life and education ==
Perez earned his undergraduate degree in Philosophy, graduating cum laude from Ateneo de Manila University, and obtained his law degree from San Beda College of Law where he graduated as valedictorian. He also holds a Master of Laws (LL.M.) from the University of Pennsylvania, one of the top law schools in the United States.

== Career ==
Before his appointment to the Court of Appeals in 2014, Perez had a distinguished career spanning over three decades in both legal practice and academia. He has served as a law professor and dean, held positions as general counsel in various corporations, led a corporate law department, and engaged in private law practice. With the Court of Appeals reorganization in 2022, Perez was assigned as a member of the 2nd Division.
