= Edilwasif Baddiri =

Filipino jurist and Associate Justice of the Court of Appeals

The Honorable Edilwasif Baddiri

Associate Justice of the Court of Appeals
- Incumbent
- Assumed office April 14, 2025
- Appointed by: Bongbong Marcos
- Preceded by: Edwin Sorongon

Judge of Branch 115, Regional Trial Court, Pasay City
- In office June 8, 2020 – April 14, 2025
- Preceded by: Francisco G. Mendiola
- Succeeded by: Acting Judge Maria Luwalhati Carandang Cruz

Commissioner of the National Commission on Muslim Filipinos
- In office 2010–2015

Personal details
- Born: December 13, 1975 (age 50)
- Education: Ateneo de Manila University (LL.B.); Harvard University (MPA)
- Occupation: Jurist
- Profession: Lawyer

Edilwasif Baddiri (born December 13, 1975) is a Filipino lawyer, public servant, and jurist serving as an Associate Justice of the Court of Appeals since 2025.

== Education ==
Baddiri earned his law degree from the Ateneo de Manila University School of Law in 2000. In 2006, he obtained a Master of Public Administration degree from Harvard University as a Fulbright Scholar.

== Early career and advocacy ==
Before joining the judiciary, Baddiri served as a legislator in the province of Sulu. As a lawyer, he handled human rights cases and provided legal assistance to indigent clients.

He was also active in Muslim civic and professional organizations and became a convener of the Young Moro Professionals Network. Baddiri has written extensively on issues concerning the Bangsamoro people, the Philippine government, and the Philippine peace process.

== Government and judicial career ==
From 2010 to 2015, Baddiri served as Commissioner of the "National Commission on Muslim Filipinos", "Quezon City, Philippines"

In 2015, he was appointed Presiding Judge of Branch 115 of the Regional Trial Court in Pasay City. He later became Executive Judge of the RTC of Pasay City in 2023.

== Court of Appeals ==
On April 14, 2025, President Bongbong Marcos appointed Baddiri as Associate Justice of the Court of Appeals, succeeding Associate Justice Edwin Sorongon, who had retired from the appellate court.
