= Socorro Inting =

Filipino lawyer and jurist

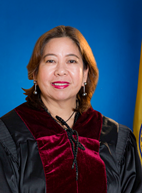
- Official portrait of Inting as a COMELEC commissioner

Commissioner of the Commission on Elections
- In office April 17, 2018 – February 2, 2025
- Appointed by: Rodrigo Duterte
- Preceded by: Arthur Lim
- Succeeded by: Maria Norina Tangaro-Casingal

Associate Justice of the Court of Appeals of the Philippines
- In office 2009–2018

Presiding Judge of the Regional Trial Court, Branch 4, Manila

Presiding Judge of the Metropolitan Trial Court, Branch 63, Makati

Personal details
- Born: Davao City, Philippines
- Education: Ateneo de Davao University (LL.B., 1980, cum laude)
- Occupation: Lawyer, Judge

Socorro Balinghasay Inting is a Filipino lawyer and jurist who served as a commissioner of the Commission on Elections (COMELEC) from May 2018 to February 2, 2025. She was appointed by President Rodrigo Duterte to replace Arthur Lim. Before joining COMELEC, she was an Associate Justice of the Court of Appeals of the Philippines.

== Early life and education ==
Socorro Inting was born in Davao City, Philippines. She earned her Bachelor of Laws degree, graduating cum laude from Ateneo de Davao University in 1980.

== Legal and judicial career ==
Inting started her legal career by practicing law in Davao City for three years. During this period, she was elected as the treasurer of the Integrated Bar of the Philippines (IBP), Davao del Sur Chapter.

She started government service as a public attorney with the Public Attorney's Office (PAO), where she served for seven years. She then worked as a prosecutor for six years before being appointed as Presiding Judge of the Metropolitan Trial Court, Branch 26, in Makati City. She later became the Presiding Judge of the Regional Trial Court, Branch 95, in Quezon City, and subsequently of Branch 4 in Manila, where she served for a total of twelve years. In 2009, she was appointed as an Associate Justice of the Court of Appeals of the Philippines, a position she held until 2018.

== Commission on Elections ==
In April 2018, President Rodrigo Duterte appointed Inting as Commissioner of the Commission on Elections (COMELEC). Her appointment was confirmed by the Commission on Appointments on May 30, 2018. During her tenure, she twice assumed the role of acting COMELEC chairperson. She first served in this capacity in February 2022 after the retirement of Chairman Sheriff Abas. She was later reappointed as acting chairperson in June 2022 when the commission on Appointments bypassed the ad interim appointment of Chairman Saidamen Pangarungan.

On March 8, 2022, Inting announced the suspension of COMELEC's fact-checking partnership with Rappler, citing legal challenges against the agreement. The partnership, which aimed to combat misinformation during the 2022 Philippine general elections, was questioned by Solicitor General Jose Calida, who filed a petition before the Supreme Court of the Philippines, arguing that the deal was illegal. Inting stated that the suspension was necessary to assure the public of the commission's independence and impartiality and to prevent further controversy that could affect public trust in the electoral body.

In April 2022, Inting resigned as chairperson of the COMELEC Committee on the Ban on Firearms and Security Concerns (CBFSC), following a resolution granting the COMELEC chairman the power to approve gun ban exemptions. She called the move an absurdity, arguing that it undermined the committee's authority and made its function redundant. Following her resignation, Commissioner Aimee Ferolino-Ampoloquio was appointed as the acting chair of the CBFSC.

Inting retired as COMELEC Commissioner on February 2, 2025.

== Personal life ==
Inting comes from a family of legal professionals. Her younger brother, Henri Jean Paul Inting, was appointed as an Associate Justice of the Supreme Court of the Philippines in 2019. Her daughter, Niña Ma. Socorro Inting, works as a Public Attorney.

Preceded by Arthur Lim	Commissioner of the Commission on Elections; 2018–2025	Succeeded by Maria Norina Tangaro-Casingal
