= Joeffre Acebido =

Filipino jurist and lawyer (born 1961)

The Honorable Joeffre Acebido

Associate Justice of the Court of Appeals
- Incumbent
- Assumed office April 14, 2025
- Appointed by: Bongbong Marcos
- Preceded by: Victoria Isabel Paredes

Judge of Branch 41, Regional Trial Court, Cagayan de Oro

Personal details
- Born: July 23, 1961 (age 65)
- Education: Silliman University (LL.B.)
- Occupation: Jurist
- Profession: Lawyer

Joeffre Acebido (born July 23, 1961) is a Filipino lawyer and jurist serving as an Associate Justice of the Court of Appeals since 2025.

Prior to his elevation to the appellate court, he served as Presiding Judge of Branch 41 of the Regional Trial Court in Cagayan de Oro.

== Education ==
Acebido graduated from Silliman University with a Bachelor of Laws degree in 1986.

In 2013, he was conferred the Outstanding Sillimanian Award for Judicial Service.

== Legal and judicial career ==
Before joining the judiciary, Acebido worked as a prosecutor, Public Attorney, and senior legal officer at the Commission on Human Rights.

He later joined the bench and served for sixteen years as a judge of the Regional Trial Court. Prior to his appointment to the appellate court, he served as Presiding Judge of Branch 41 of the RTC in Cagayan de Oro.

Acebido received the Chief Justice Cayetano Arellano Award for Judicial Excellence in recognition of his integrity and judicial service.

== Court of Appeals ==
On April 14, 2025, President Bongbong Marcos appointed Acebido as Associate Justice of the Court of Appeals. He succeeded Associate Justice Victoria Isabel Paredes, who had retired from the appellate court.
