= Emily Aliño-Geluz =

Associate Justice Emily R. Aliño-Geluz
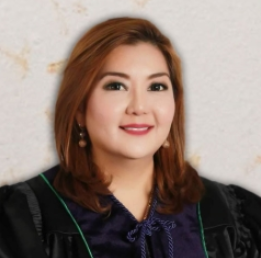

Associate Justice of the Court of Appeals of the Philippines
- Incumbent
- Assumed office April 30, 2018
- Preceded by: Leoncia Real-Dimagiba

Personal details
- Born: October 5, 1971 (age 54) Cotabato City, Philippines
- Education: Ateneo de Davao University
- Occupation: Judge, Lawyer
- Known for: Member, Philippine Women Judges Association

Emily R. Aliño-Geluz (born October 5, 1971) is a Filipino lawyer and jurist who currently serves as an Associate Justice of the Court of Appeals of the Philippines. She was appointed to the appellate court on April 30, 2018, by President Rodrigo Duterte.

== Early life and education ==
Aliño-Geluz was born in Cotabato City. She obtained her law degree from the Ateneo de Davao University.

== Career ==
Before joining the judiciary, Aliño-Geluz served as the Sangguniang Bayan Secretary of the Municipality of Imus, Cavite.

She entered the judiciary in 2002 as Branch Clerk of Court of the Regional Trial Court (RTC) Branch 138 in Makati City. In 2007, she was appointed as Assistant City Prosecutor in Makati City.

In 2008, she became Presiding Judge of the Municipal Trial Court of Imus, Cavite. Four years later, in 2012, she was promoted to the Regional Trial Court of Las Piñas City, with an additional designation as Acting Presiding Judge of the RTC in Trece Martires City, Cavite.

On April 30, 2018, President Rodrigo Duterte appointed her as Associate Justice of the Court of Appeals.

=== Arrest warrant against Jude Sabio ===
In April 2019, the Court of Appeals overturned an order previously issued by then-Trece Martires Regional Trial Court Judge Emily Aliño-Geluz directing the arrest of lawyer Jude Sabio, who had filed a case before the International Criminal Court (ICC) against President Rodrigo Duterte. Geluz had ordered Sabio's arrest for failure to comply with Mandatory Continuing Legal Education (MCLE) requirements. The appellate court ruled that Geluz had no authority to imprison a lawyer for MCLE non-compliance, noting that under the Implementing Rules of B.M. No. 850, the matter falls under the disciplinary power of the Integrated Bar of the Philippines (IBP).

== Sources ==
This article incorporates text from a free content work. Licensed under public domain as a work of the Philippine government. Text taken from PHILJA In Pursuit of Judicial Excellence, 12, Government of the Republic of the Philippines, Philippine Judicial Academy.

== See also ==
- Court of Appeals of the Philippines
- Judiciary of the Philippines
