= Martin Villarama Jr. =

Filipino judge (born 1946)

The Honorable Martin S. Villarama Jr.

166th Associate Justice of the Supreme Court of the Philippines
- In office December 26, 2009 – January 16, 2016
- President: Gloria Macapagal Arroyo
- Preceded by: Consuelo Ynares-Santiago
- Succeeded by: Alfredo Benjamin Caguioa

Personal details
- Born: Martin S. Villarama Jr. April 14, 1946 (age 80) Angat, Bulacan, Philippines
- Spouse: Atty. Ma. Luisa Dizon-Villarama
- Children: Dr. Clarissa D. Villarama-Cellona; Judge Carlo D. Villarama
- Education: De La Salle University; Manuel L. Quezon University
- Occupation: Lawyer

Martin S. Villarama Jr. (born April 14, 1946) is a Filipino lawyer who served as an associate justice of the Supreme Court of the Philippines from November 3, 2009, to January 16, 2016. Prior to his appointment as associate justice of the Supreme Court, he served as associate justice of the Court of Appeals since March 11, 1998. He also served in the Regional Trial Court of Pasig as judge from 1986 to 1998 and as its executive judge from 1992 to 1996.

== Early life and education ==
Villarama was born on April 14, 1946. He obtained his degree in Business Administration from De La Salle University. He took Bachelor of Laws from Manuel L. Quezon University.

== Career ==
Villarama began his law career as a technical assistant in the Legal Research Division (now Office of the Chief Attorney) of the Supreme Court in 1970. He then worked as legal counsel or corporate secretary for several companies including the Philippine Carpet Manufacturing Corporation, UTEX, FILSYN, and the Philippine Cotton Corporation. He also worked as a lecturer for Manuel L. Quezon University from 1973 up to 1994. He rejoined the Judiciary after being appointed Judge of the Pasig Regional Trial Court and served there from November 5, 1986, to April 5, 1998. He served as its executive judge from 1992 to 1996. He then served as the associate justice of Court of Appeals from 1998 until 2009 where he served as chair of the Fifth Division and supervising justice of the Judicial Records Division. He also served as examiner in the 2004 Bar Examinations and as lecturer at the Philippine Judicial Academy in 2007.

In November 2009, after a few nominations to the Supreme Court, he was appointed the 166th Associate Justice of the Supreme Court of the Philippines by then President Gloria Macapagal-Arroyo. He assumed the post vacated by retired Associate Justice Consuelo Ynares-Santiago. In January 2012, at the height of the Impeachment of Chief Justice Renato Corona he made news by voluntarily releasing his statement of assets, liabilities and net worth to news organizations. On January 16, 2016, he retired early citing a deteriorating health condition due to a double-knee metal implantation in 2013 and cataract operation in 2014. His retirement was three months ahead of his 70th birthday, which was the mandatory retirement age.

=== Awards ===
Throughout his career, Villarama has gotten a number of awards for his service. He is a recipient of Ulirang Ama Award for Law and Judiciary in 1997 and Katangi-tanging Anak ng Angat, Bulacan, in 2003. During the 71st anniversary of the Court of Appeals he was recognized as one of the justices with the least pending cases. Prior to that he was already awarded the Zero-Backlog Cash Award on February 2, 2001, and October 27, 2009. He was also awarded as an Outstanding Alumnus of Manuel L. Quezon University in 2010.

Legal offices
Preceded by Consuelo Ynares-Santiago	Associate Justice of the Supreme Court of the Philippines; 2009–2016	Succeeded by Alfredo Benjamin Caguioa
