= Fernanda Lampas-Peralta =

Filipino lawyer, accountant, and jurist

The Honorable Fernanda Lampas-Peralta
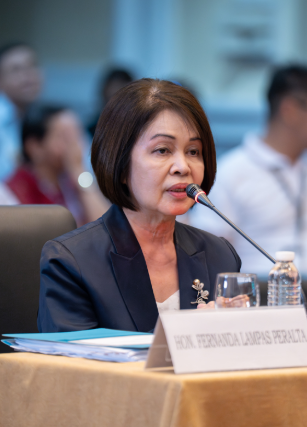

Presiding Justice of the Court of Appeals of the Philippines
- Incumbent
- Assumed office November 18, 2024
- Appointed by: Bongbong Marcos
- Preceded by: Mariflor Punzalan-Castillo

Personal details
- Born: Fernanda Cruz Lampas; June 26, 1960 (age 66)
- Spouse: Diosdado Peralta
- Education: University of the East (BBA); San Beda College of Law; Far Eastern University Institute of Law
- Occupation: Judge
- Profession: Lawyer, jurist, accountant

Fernanda Lampas-Peralta (born June 26, 1960) is a Filipino lawyer, certified public accountant, and jurist who is the current Presiding Justice of the Court of Appeals of the Philippines. She was appointed by President Bongbong Marcos and took her oath of office on November 18, 2024, at the Malacañan Palace.

== Early life and education ==
Peralta earned her degree in Business Administration from the University of the East. She later studied law at the San Beda College of Law in Mendiola and the Far Eastern University Institute of Law. She became a certified public accountant in 1980 and passed the Philippine Bar Examination in 1984.

== Career ==
Peralta began her career at the Office of the Solicitor General, where she served as associate solicitor and trial attorney.

From 1981 to 1983, she also taught accountancy as a part-time instructor at the University of the East.

She was appointed associate justice of the Court of Appeals and later became its acting presiding justice in September 2023, following the retirement of Presiding Justice Remedios Salazar Fernando.

On November 18, 2024, President Bongbong Marcos formally appointed Peralta as Presiding Justice of the Court of Appeals, making her the head of the country’s second-highest collegiate court.

== Personal life ==
Peralta is married to retired Chief Justice Diosdado Peralta.
