= Pedro Concepcion =

Filipino lawyer, jurist, and election official

The Honorable Pedro Concepción

Chairman of the Commission on Elections
- In office September 1, 1940 – May 11, 1941
- Appointed by: Manuel L. Quezon
- Preceded by: Post created
- Succeeded by: José López Vito

35th Associate Justice of the Philippine Supreme Court
- In office October 31, 1936 – January 1, 1940
- Appointed by: Manuel L. Quezon

Pedro Concepción was a Filipino lawyer and was the first chairman of the Philippine election commission, the COMELEC.

== COMELEC ==
On August 22, 1940, the National Assembly moved for the passage of Commonwealth Act No. 607, a law was already under study seeking the amendment of the 1935 Constitution to clothe the Commission with “constitutional” status. Thus was born the first COMELEC with lawyer Pedro Concepcion as the first chairman and José Abreu and Rufino Luna as members. There were only 39 employees then – a number that would expand to some 5,301 in the next 66 years. The law vested in it the same powers which it would have under the amended 1935 Constitution.

== Notes ==
| Preceded by Commission Created; Under CA No. 607 | COMELEC Chairman; September 1, 1940 – May 11, 1941 | Succeeded by José López Vito |
