= Henri Jean Paul Inting =

Filipino judge (born 1957)

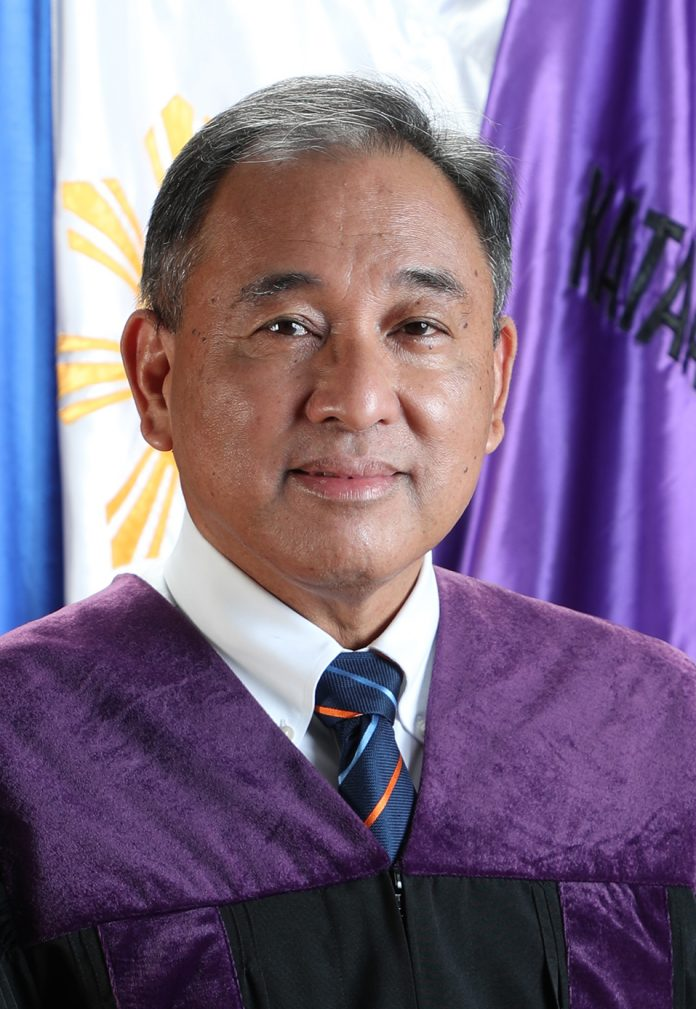
- Inting in 2022

Associate Justice of the Supreme Court of the Philippines
- Incumbent
- Assumed office May 27, 2019
- Appointed by: Rodrigo Duterte
- Preceded by: Lucas Bersamin

Justice of the Court of Appeals of the Philippines
- In office September 14, 2012 – May 27, 2019
- Appointed by: Benigno Aquino III
- Preceded by: Mario Guariña Iiil
- Succeeded by: Roberto Quiroz

Personal details
- Born: Henri Jean Paul Balinghasay Inting; September 4, 1957 (age 69) Bansalan, Davao del Sur, Philippines
- Education: University of San Carlos (BS); Ateneo de Davao University (LLB)

Henri Jean Paul Balinghasay Inting (born September 4, 1957) is a Filipino judge who has served as an associate justice of the Supreme Court of the Philippines since 2019. He was appointed by President Rodrigo Duterte, replacing Lucas Bersamin, who was appointed chief justice.

== Early life and career ==
Inting was born on September 4, 1957, in Bansalan, Davao del Sur. Inting earned his Bachelor of Science degree in psychology at the University of San Carlos in Cebu City in 1978. He received a Bachelor of Laws degree at the Ateneo de Davao University in 1982, where he also finished his elementary and secondary education. He then served as a Public Attorney's Office lawyer, making him the first PAO lawyer to become a Supreme Court Justice. He was appointed to the Court of Appeals of the Philippines on September 14, 2012.

== Associate Justice of the Philippines ==
In May 2019 Inting was appointed by President Rodrigo Duterte as an associate justice of the Supreme Court of the Philippines to replace then-associate justice Lucas Bersamin who was appointed Chief Justice of the Supreme Court of the Philippines on November 28, 2018.

Legal offices
Preceded by Lucas Bersamin	Associate Justice of the Supreme Court of the Philippines; 2019–present	Incumbent
