= Judiciary of the Philippines =

The judiciary of the Philippines consists of the Supreme Court, which is established by the Constitution, and three levels of lower courts, which are established by law by the Congress of the Philippines. The Supreme Court has expansive powers, including the authority to overrule political and administrative decisions, and the ability to craft rules and law without precedent. It further determines the rules of procedure for lower courts, and its members sit on electoral tribunals.

Below the Supreme Court is the Court of Appeals, which also has nationwide jurisdiction, with different divisions based in different regions of the country. Decisions from this court may only be appealed to the Supreme Court. Below this level are Regional Trial Courts, which are spread throughout the country among judicial regions. Some of these courts are specialized to deal with certain types of cases. Below these courts are the first-level Metropolitan and Municipal Trial Courts, which are located in cities and municipalities throughout the country.

Outside the regular court system, special courts have been set up to deal with particular cases. These include the Court of Tax Appeals and the Sandiganbayan, which are considered equivalent to the Court of Appeals. In some parts of the country, Sharia courts have been established. Outside the court system, a number of quasi-judicial bodies have powers established by law.

The Supreme Court was given its expansive powers following the period of martial law, during which the executive dominated. While the Judiciary oversees the other branches of government, judges are appointed by the President of the Philippines from a shortlist submitted by the Judicial and Bar Council, a body the president can influence.

== Hierarchy of courts ==
Hierarchy of courts of the Philippines

Supreme Court of the Philippines
Sandiganbayan	Court of Tax Appeals	Court of Appeals
Regional Trial Court	Sharia District Court
Metropolitan Trial Court	Municipal Trial Court in Cities	Municipal Trial Courts	Municipal Circuit Trial Court	Sharia Circuit Court
Barangay Justice

== Supreme Court ==
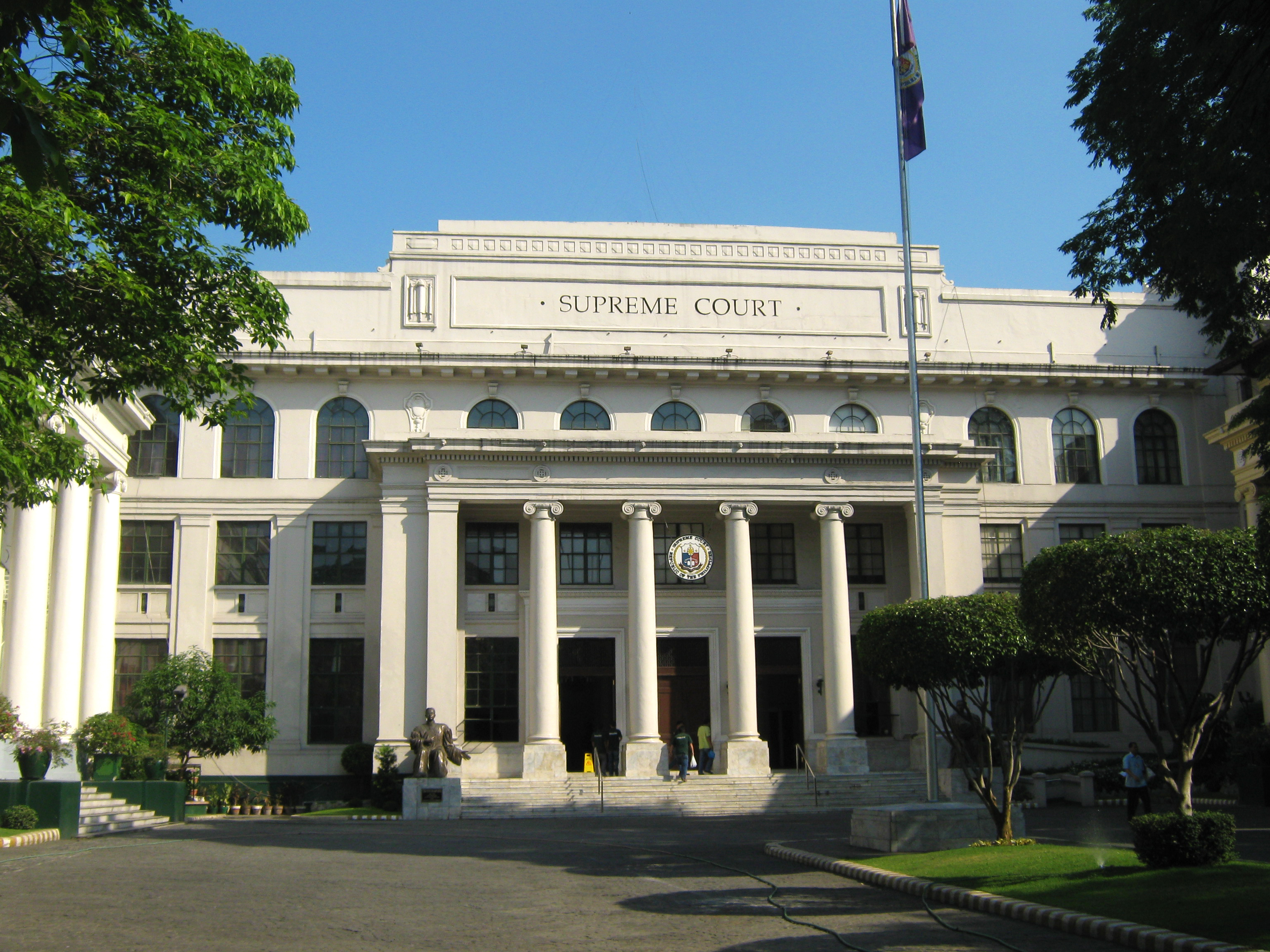
Entrance to the Supreme Court

The Supreme Court (SC) is the highest court of the land and is the court of last resort. It is led by the Chief Justice, who is joined by 14 Associate Justices. The court has expansive powers and a constitutional responsibility to oversee other branches of government, able even to overrule the discretion of political and administrative individuals and bodies. This power is a response to a previous period of martial law during which the courts often declined to act against the Executive. These powers also gave the courts rule-making abilities more typically associated with legislatures.

The 1987 constitution gives the Supreme Court "original jurisdiction on cases affecting ambassadors, other public ministers and consuls, and over petitions for certiorari, prohibition, mandamus, quo warranto, and habeas corpus". It is the appellate court for cases where "the constitutionality or validity of any treaty, international or executive agreement, law, presidential decree, proclamation, order, instruction, ordinance, or regulation is in question", for the "legality of any tax" and related matters, where the "jurisdiction of any lower court is in issue", "criminal cases where the penalty is reclusión perpetua or higher", and "in which only an error or question of law is involved". Appeals from lower courts are taken on certiorari. Appellate jurisdiction over various matters can be increased by the Philippine Congress in agreement with the court.

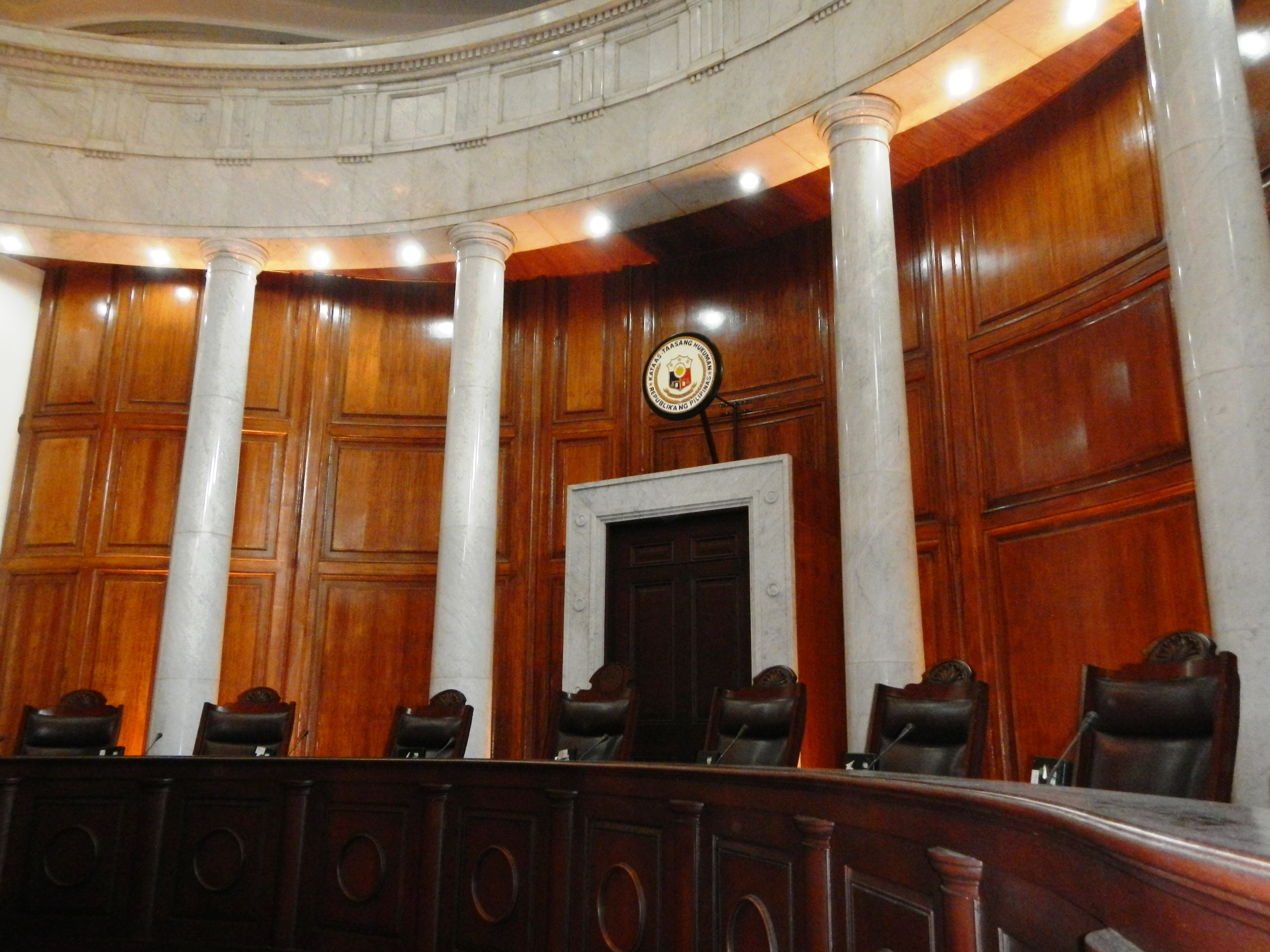
Internal session hall

The court's powers allow it to create new law without requiring precedent, and on which its decision is final. The Oposa v. Factoran case, centered on environmental protection, saw the court recognize the rights of future generations. Writs of amparo and habeas data were approved in 2007, to better enable courts to deal with extrajudicial killings and disappearances. In 2008 it rewrote libel guidelines, reducing penalties. Environmental protections were further enhanced through the approval of the writ of kalikasan in 2010, which provided protections against extreme environmental damage. Both of these writs came with a provision that removed filing fees. The 2010 rules of procedure for environmental cases established by the Supreme Court were a first for any country. In 2015 the court recognized the standing of cetaceans, including "toothed whales, dolphins, [and] porpoises", who while lacking independent legal personality could be represented by Philippine citizens, in a case regarding oil exploration in the Tañon Strait. The decision came following a case lasting eight years, ending long after the oil exploration had already ceased.

The Supreme Court is the only court established through the constitution, with all lower courts being established through legislation. It makes up the fourth and highest level of court, with lower courts on the same level unable to review the decisions of courts at the same level. The rules governing the proceedings in the lower courts are determined by the Supreme Court.

== Regular courts ==
In addition to the Supreme Court, there are three lower levels of regular courts. This structure is hierarchical. Second and first-level courts are organized geographically, although this is purely an administrative arrangement.

=== Third-level courts ===
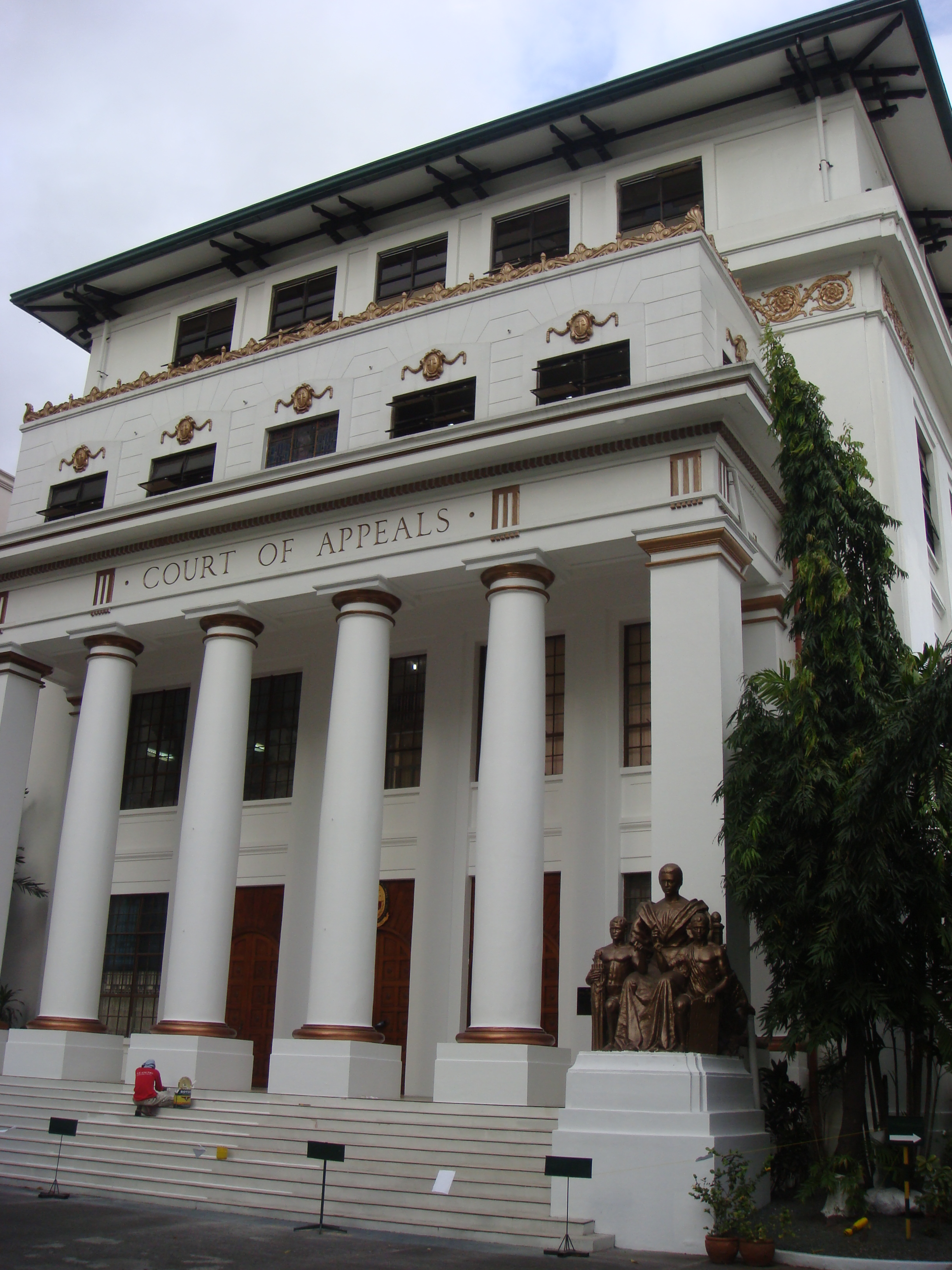
Entrance of the Court of Appeals

The Court of Appeals (CA) is the appellate court for civil and criminal cases not involving actions related to governing the country, and has original jurisdiction on issuance of writs of mandamus, prohibition, injunction, certiorari, habeas corpus and other auxiliary writs. The court is composed of 68 associate justices headed by a presiding justice. These are divided into 23 divisions of 3 members, 17 of which are based in Manila and hear cases from Luzon, 3 of which are based in Cebu City and hear cases from the Visayas, and 3 which are based in Cagayan de Oro and hear cases from Mindanao. The court shares some concurrent original jurisdiction with the Supreme Court. It is the second highest court, and decisions reached by this court can only be appealed to the Supreme Court on questions of law.

=== Second-level courts ===
A regional trial court (RTC) has original jurisdiction on criminal matters, except on those where the Sandiganbayan has original jurisdiction on, and for certain civil suits. Multiple branches of regional trial courts can be established in the same judicial region. Each branch, as in all second and first level courts, is led by a single judge. Some RTC branches are directed to focus exclusively on certain types of cases.

=== First-level courts ===
First-level courts have original jurisdiction on criminal matters, except on those where the Sandiganbayan and regional trial courts have original jurisdiction on, on violations of city or municipal ordinances, on certain civil cases, and on cases involving forcible entry. Each court has one judge. A party may appeal to a regional trial court.

The following are the first level courts:

- Metropolitan trial courts (MeTC) are first level courts in Metro Manila
- Municipal trial courts (MTC) are first level courts in each municipality
- Municipal trial courts in cities (MTCC) are first level courts in each city outside Metro Manila
- Municipal circuit trial courts (MCTC) are first level courts in two or more municipalities

List of first-level courts in the Philippines
Province/City	First-level courts
Abra	MTC Bangued; MTC Bucay; MTC Lagangilang; 1st MCTC (Pidigan–San Quintin–Langiden); 2nd MCTC (Tayum–Peñarrubia); 3rd MCTC (Pilar–Villaviciosa–San Isidro); 4th MCTC (Manabo–Boliney–Tubo–Luba); 5th MCTC (Sallapadan–Bucloc–Daguioman); 6th MCTC (La Paz–Lagayan–Danglas); 7th MCTC (Dolores–San Juan); 8th MCTC (Baay-Licuan–Malibcong–Lacub–Tineg)
Agusan del Norte	MTC Buenavista; MTC Carmen; MTC Nasipit; MTCC Cabadbaran Single Sala; 1st MCTC (Magallanes–Las Nieves–Remedios T. Romualdez); 2nd MCTC (Tubay–Santiago); 3rd MCTC (Jabonga–Kitcharao)
Agusan del Sur	MTC Prosperidad; MTCC Bayugan; 1st MCTC (San Francisco–Bunawan–Rosario); 2nd MCTC (Trento–Santa Josefa–Veruela); 3rd MCTC (Loreto–La Paz); 4th MCTC (Esperanza–San Luis–Talacogon–Sibagat)
Aklan	MTC Kalibo; 1st MCTC (New Washington–Batan); 2nd MCTC (Banga–Libacao–Madalag); 3rd MCTC (Malinao–Lezo–Numancia); 4th MCTC (Makato–Tangalan); 5th MCTC (Malay–Buruanga); 6th MCTC (Altavas–Balete); 7th MCTC (Ibajay–Nabas)
Albay	MTC Daraga; MTC Guinobatan; MTC Pio Duran; MTC Rapu-Rapu; MTCC Legazpi Branches 1, 2 and 3; MTCC Ligao Single Sala; MTCC Tabaco Single Sala; 1st MCTC (Malinao–Tiwi); 2nd MCTC (Bacacay–Malilipot); 3rd MCTC (Santo Domingo–Manito); 4th MCTC (Camalig–Jovellar); 6th MCTC (Polangui–Libon–Oas)
Angeles City	MTCC Angeles City Branches 1, 2, 3, 4 and 5
Antique	MTC San Jose; 1st MCTC (Tobias Fornier–Anini-y–Hamtic); 2nd MCTC (Sibalom–San Remigio–Belison); 3rd MCTC (Patnongon–Bugasong–Valderrama); 4th MCTC (Barbaza–Laua-an–Tibiao); 5th MCTC (Culasi–Sebaste); 6th MCTC (Pandan–Libertad–Caluya)
Apayao	4th MCTC (Luna–Pudtol–Calanasan); 5th MCTC (Flora–Santa Marcela); 6th MCTC (Kabugao–Conner)
Aurora	MTC Dingalan; 1st MCTC (Casiguran–Dilasag–Dinalongan); 2nd MCTC (Maria Aurora–Dipaculao); 3rd MCTC (Baler–San Luis)
Bacolod	MTCC Bacolod Branches 1, 2, 3, 4, 5, 6 and 7
Baguio	MTCC Baguio Branches 1, 2, 3, 4, 5 and 6
Basilan	MTCC Isabela Single Sala; MTCC Lamitan Single Sala; 2nd MCTC (Maluso–Lantawan–Sumisip)
Bataan	MTC Abucay; MTC Limay; MTC Mariveles; MTCC Balanga Single Sala; 1st MCTC (Dinalupihan–Hermosa); 2nd MCTC (Orani–Samal); 3rd MCTC (Pilar–Orion); 4th MCTC (Bagac–Morong)
Batanes	MTC Itbayat; MTC Sabtang; 1st MCTC (Basco–Mahatao); 2nd MCTC (Ivana–Uyugan)
Batangas	MTC Balayan; MTC Bauan; MTC Calatagan; MTC Cuenca; MTC Lemery; MTC Lian; MTC Mataas-na-Kahoy; MTC Nasugbu; MTC Padre Garcia; MTC Rosario; MTC San Jose; MTC San Juan; MTC San Pascual; MTC Tuy; MTC Ibaan; MTCC Batangas City Branches 1 and 2; MTCC Calaca; MTCC Lipa Branches 1, 2 and 3; MTCC Santo Tomas; MTCC Tanauan Single Sala; 1st MCTC (Mabini–Tingloy); 2nd MCTC (Taysan–Lobo); 3rd MCTC (Alitagtag–Santa Teresita); 4th MCTC (Malvar–Balete); 5th MCTC (Talisay–Laurel); 6th MCTC (San Luis–Agoncillo); 7th MCTC (Taal–San Nicolas)
Benguet	MTC Itogon; MTC La Trinidad; MTC Mankayan; 1st MCTC (Kapangan–Kibungan); 2nd MCTC (Tublay–Atok); 3rd MCTC (Kabayan–Bokod); 4th MCTC (Buguias–Bakun); 5th MCTC (Tuba–Sablan)
Biliran	MTC Maripipi; MTC Naval; 1st MCTC (Kawayan–Almeria); 2nd MCTC (Biliran–Cabucgayan); 3rd MCTC (Caibiran–Culaba)
Bohol	MTC Calape; MTC Loon; MTCC Tagbilaran Branches 1, 2, 3 and 4; 1st MCTC (Cortes–Antequera–Maribojoc); 2nd MCTC (Tubigon–Clarin); 3rd MCTC (Inabanga–Buenavista); 4th MCTC (Talibon–Jetafe); 5th MCTC (Trinidad–San Miguel–Bien Unido); 6th MCTC (Ubay–President Carlos P. Garcia); 7th MCTC (Alicia–Mabini); 8th MCTC (Candijay–Anda); 9th MCTC (Guindulman–Duero); 10th MCTC (Jagna–Garcia Hernandez); 11th MCTC (Valencia–Dimiao); 12th MCTC (Lila–Loboc); 13th MCTC (Loay–Albuquerque–Baclayon); 14th MCTC (Dauis–Panglao); 15th MCTC (Bilar–Sevilla); 16th MCTC (Carmen–Batuan); 17th MCTC (Sierra Bullones–Pilar); 18th MCTC (Dagohoy–Danao); 19th MCTC (Balilihan–Sikatuna–Corella); 20th MCTC (Catigbian–San Isidro–Sagbayan)
Bukidnon	MTC San Fernando; MTC Quezon; MTCC Malaybalay Single Sala; MTCC Valencia Single Sala; 1st MCTC (Talakag–Malitbog–Baungon); 2nd MCTC (Manolo Fortich–Libona); 3rd MCTC (Impasug-ong–Sumilao); 4th MCTC (Maramag–Kalilangan–Pangantucan); 5th MCTC (Don Carlos–Dangcagan–Kitaotao); 6th MCTC (Kibawe–Damulog–Kadingilan); 7th MCTC (Lantapan–Cabanglaasan)
Bulacan	MTC Angat; MTC Balagtas; MTC Bocaue; MTC Bulacan Branches 1 and 2; MTC Bustos; MTC Calumpit; MTC Doña Remedios Trinidad; MTC Guiguinto; MTC Hagonoy; MTC Marilao; MTC Norzagaray; MTC Obando; MTC Pandi; MTC Paombong; MTC Plaridel; MTC Pulilan; MTC San Rafael; MTC San Ildefonso; MTC San Miguel; MTC Santa Maria; MTCC Baliuag; MTCC Malolos Branches 1 and 2; MTCC Meycauayan Branches 1 and 2; MTCC San Jose del Monte Branches 1, 2 and 3
Butuan	MTCC Butuan Branch 1, 2, 3 and 4
Cagayan	MTC Abulug; MTC Alcala; MTC Baggao; MTC Ballesteros; MTC Buguey; MTC Camalaniugan; MTC Gattaran; MTC Lal-lo Branches 1, 2 and 3; MTC Peñablanca; MTC Rizal; MTC Santa Ana; MTC Tuao; MTCC Tuguegarao Branches 1, 2, 3 and 4; 1st MCTC (Claveria–Santa Praxedes); 2nd MCTC (Sanchez Mira–Pamplona); 3rd MCTC (Allacapan–Lasam); 4th MCTC (Gonzaga–Santa Teresita); 5th MCTC (Amulung–Iguig); 6th MCTC (Solana–Enrile); 7th MCTC (Piat–Santo Niño); 8th MCTC (Aparri–Calayan) Branches 1 and 2
Cagayan de Oro	MTCC Cagayan de Oro Branches 1, 2, 3, 4, 5, 6 and 7
Caloocan	MeTC Branches 49, 50, 51, 52, 53, 83, 84, 85 and 86
Camarines Norte	MTC Basud; MTC Daet Branches 1 and 2; MTC Jose Panganiban; MTC Labo; MTC Mercedes; MTC Paracale; MTC Talisay; MTC Vinzons; 1st MCTC (Capalonga–Santa Elena); 2nd MCTC (San Lorenzo Ruiz–Imelda–San Vicente)
Camarines Sur	MTC Baao; MTC Balatan; MTC Bombon; MTC Buhi; MTC Bula; MTC Calabanga; MTC Caramoan; MTC Garchitorena; MTC Goa; MTC Lagonoy; MTC Minalabac; MTC Ocampo; MTC Pasacao; MTC Pili; MTC Siruma; MTC Tinambac; MTCC Iriga Branches 1 and 2; 1st MCTC (Ragay–Del Gallego); 2nd MCTC (Sipocot–Lupi); 3rd MCTC (Libmanan–Cabusao); 4th MCTC (San Fernando–Pamplona); 5th MCTC (Camaligan–Gainza–Milaor); 6th MCTC (Magarao–Canaman); 7th MCTC (Tigaon–Sagnay); 8th MCTC (San Jose–Presentacion); 9th MCTC (Nabua–Bato)
Camiguin	MTC Mambajao; 1st MCTC (Mahinog–Guinsiliban); 2nd MCTC (Catarman–Sagay)
Capiz	MTC Maayon; MTC Mambusao; MTC Panitan; MTCC Roxas City Branches 1, 2, 3 and 4; 1st MCTC (President Roxas–Pilar); 2nd MCTC (Pontevedra–Panay); 3rd MCTC (Dao–Ivisan); 4th MCTC (Dumarao–Cuartero); 5th MCTC (Sigma–Sapian–Jamindan); 6th MCTC (Dumalag–Tapaz)
Catanduanes	MTC San Andres; MTC Virac; 1st MCTC (Bato–San Miguel); 2nd MCTC (Baras–Gigmoto); 3rd MCTC (Panganiban–Viga–Bagamanoc); 4th MCTC (Pandan–Caramoran)
Cavite	MTC General Mariano Alvarez; MTC Kawit; MTC Naic; MTC Noveleta; MTC Rosario; MTC Tanza; MTCC Bacoor Branches 1, 2 and 3; MTCC Carmona; MTCC Cavite City Branches 1 and 2; MTCC Dasmariñas Branches 1, 2, 3 and 4; MTCC General Trias; MTCC Imus Branches 1, 2, 3 and 4; MTCC Tagaytay Single Sala; MTCC Trece Martires; 1st MCTC (Maragondon–Ternate–Magallanes); 2nd MCTC (Silang–Amadeo); 3rd MCTC (Indang–Mendez-Nuñez); 4th MCTC (Alfonso–General Emilio Aguinaldo)
Cebu	MTC Argao; MTC Barili; MTC Dalaguete; MTC Minglanilla; MTC San Fernando; MTC Sibonga; MTCC Bogo Single Sala; MTCC Carcar Single Sala; MTCC Danao Single Sala; MTCC Naga; MTCC Talisay Branches 1 and 2; MTCC Toledo Single Sala; 1st MCTC (Bantayan–Santa Fe–Madridejos); 2nd MCTC (Poro–San Francisco–Tudela–Pilar); 3rd MCTC (Daan-Bantayan–Medellin–San Remigio); 5th MCTC (Borbon–Tabogon); 6th MCTC (Catmon–Sogod–Carmen); 7th MCTC (Liloan–Compostela); 8th MCTC (Consolacion–Cordova); 9th MCTC (Boljoon–Alcoy); 10th MCTC (Samboan–Santander–Oslob); 11th MCTC (Malabuyoc–Ginatilan–Alegria); 12th MCTC (Moalboal–Badian–Alcantara); 13th MCTC (Dumanjug–Ronda); 14th MCTC (Pinamungahan–Aloguinsan); 15th MCTC (Balamban–Asturias); 16th MCTC (Tuburan–Tabuelan)
Cebu City	MTCC Cebu City Branches 1, 2, 3, 4, 5, 6, 7, 8, 9, 10, 11, 12, 13 and 14
Cotabato	MTC Magpet; MTC Midsayap; MTCC Kidapawan Single Sala; 1st MCTC (Makilala–Tulunan); 2nd MCTC (M'lang–Matalam); 3rd MCTC (Kabacan–Carmen); 4th MCTC (Pikit–Libungan–Aleosan); 5th MCTC (Pigkawayan–Alamada–Banisilan); 6th MCTC (President Roxas–Antipas–Arakan)
Cotabato City	MTCC Cotabato City Single Sala
Dagupan	MTCC Dagupan Branches 1, 2 and 3
Davao City	MTCC Davao City Branches 1, 2, 3, 4, 5, 6 and 7
Davao de Oro	MTC Laak (San Vicente); MTC Maco; MTC Maragusan; MTC Monkayo; 1st MCTC (Compostela–New Bataan); 3rd MCTC (Nabunturan–Mawab–Montevista); 4th MCTC (Mabini–Pantukan)
Davao del Norte	MTC Asuncion; MTC New Corella; MTCC Panabo Single Sala; MTCC Samal Branches 1 and 2; MTCC Tagum Single Sala; 1st MCTC (Carmen–Santo Tomas–Braulio E. Dujali); 3rd MCTC (Kapalong–Talaingod–San Isidro)
Davao del Sur	MTC Santa Cruz; MTCC Digos Single Sala; 1st MCTC (Bansalan–Magsaysay); 2nd MCTC (Hagonoy–Matanao); 3rd MCTC (Padada–Kiblawan); 4th MCTC (Malalag–Sulop)
Davao Occidental	5th MCTC (Malita–Santa Maria–Don Marcelino); 6th MCTC (Jose Abad Santos–Sarangani (Balut Island))
Davao Oriental	MTC Baganga; MTC Governor Generoso; MTC San Isidro; MTCC Mati Single Sala; 1st MCTC (Cateel–Boston); 2nd MCTC (Caraga–Manay–Tarragona); 3rd MCTC (Lupon–Banaybanay)
Dinagat Islands	1st MCTC (San Jose–Dinagat–Basilisa–Cagdianao (Rizal)); 2nd MCTC (Loreto–Libjo (Albor)–Tubajon)
Eastern Samar	MTC Can-avid; MTC Taft; MTCC Borongan Single Sala; 1st MCTC (San Policarpo–Arteche); 2nd MCTC (Oras–Jipapad); 3rd MCTC (Dolores–Maslog); 4th MCTC (San Julian–Sulat); 5th MCTC (Maydolong–Balangkayan); 6th MCTC (Llorente–Hernani); 7th MCTC (Guiuan–Mercedes); 8th MCTC (Salcedo–General MacArthur); 9th MCTC (Giporlos–Quinapundan); 10th MCTC (Balangiga–Lawaan)
General Santos	MTCC General Santos Branches 1, 2 and 3
Guimaras	1st MCTC (Jordan–Nueva Valencia–Sibunag); 2nd MCTC (Buenavista–San Lorenzo)
Ifugao	1st MCTC (Banaue–Hungduan–Mayoyao); 2nd MCTC (Lamut–Kiangan–Tinoc–Asipulo); 3rd MCTC (Alfonso Lista (Potia)–Aguinaldo); 4th MCTC (Lagawe–Hingyon)
Iligan	MTCC Iligan Branches 1, 2, 3, 4 and 5
Ilocos Norte	MTC Bacarra; MTC San Nicolas; MTCC Batac; MTCC Laoag Branches 1 and 2; 1st MCTC (Bangui–Pagudpud–Adams–Dumalneg); 2nd MCTC (Pasuquin–Burgos); 3rd MCTC (Sarrat–Vintar); 4th MCTC (Piddig–Carasi–Solsona); 5th MCTC (Dingras–Marcos); 6th MCTC (Espiritu–Nueva Era); 7th MCTC (Badoc–Pinili); 8th MCTC (Paoay–Currimao)
Ilocos Sur	MTC Bantay; MTC Cabugao; MTC Santo Domingo; MTC Sinait; MTCC Candon; MTCC Vigan; 1st MCTC (Magsingal–San Juan); 2nd MCTC (San Vicente–San Ildefonso); 3rd MCTC (Caoayan–Santa Catalina); 4th MCTC (Narvacan–Nagbukel–Santa); 5th MCTC (Santa Maria–Burgos); 6th MCTC (Santiago–San Esteban); 7th MCTC (Banayoyo–Lidlidda–San Emilio); 8th MCTC (Galimuyod–Salcedo); 9th MCTC (Gregorio del Pilar–Sigay); 10th MCTC (Cervantes–Quirino); 11th MCTC (Santa Cruz–Santa Lucia); 12th MCTC (Tagudin–Suyo); 13th MCTC (Alilem–Sugpon)
Iloilo	MTC Barotac Nuevo; MTC Dumangas; MTC Lambunao; MTC Miagao; MTC Oton; MTC San Joaquin; MTCC Passi; 1st MCTC (Balasan–Carles); 2nd MCTC (Estancia–Batad); 3rd MCTC (Sara–Ajuy–Lemery); 4th MCTC (San Dionisio–Concepcion); 5th MCTC (Barotac Viejo–San Rafael–Banate–Anilao); 7th MCTC (Dingle–Duenas–San Enrique); 8th MCTC (Pototan–Mina); 9th MCTC (Zarraga–New Lucena–Leganes); 10th MCTC (Calinog–Bingawan); 11th MCTC (Janiuay–Badiangan); 12th MCTC (Cabatuan–Maasin); 13th MCTC (Santa Barbara–Pavia); 14th MCTC (San Miguel–Alimodian–Leon); 15th MCTC (Guimbal–Igbaras–Tubungan–Tigbauan)
Iloilo City	MTCC Iloilo City Branches 1, 2, 3, 4, 5, 6, 7, 8, 9 and 10
Isabela	MTC Alicia; MTC Echague; MTC San Mateo; MTC Palanan; MTCC Cauayan; MTCC Ilagan; 1st MCTC (San Pablo–Santa Maria); 2nd MCTC (Cabagan–Santo Tomas); 3rd MCTC (Tumauini–Delfin Albano); 4th MCTC (Maconacon–Divilican); 5th MCTC (Naguilian–Reina Mercedes); 6th MCTC (San Mariano–Benito Soliven); 7th MCTC (Cordon–Dinapigue); 8th MCTC (Angadanan–San Guillermo); 9th MCTC (Cabatuan–Luna); 10th MCTC (Roxas–Quirino); 11th MCTC (Gamu–Burgos); 12th MCTC (Mallig–Quezon); 13th MCTC (San Manuel–Aurora); 14th MCTC (Ramon–San Isidro); 15th MCTC (Jones–San Agustin)
Kalinga	MTC Lubuagan; MTCC Tabuk Single Sala; 1st MCTC (Tinglayan–Tanudan); 2nd MCTC (Balbalan–Pasil); 3rd MCTC (Pinukpuk–Rizal)
La Union	MTC Agoo; MTC Aringay; MTC Bacnotan; MTC Balaoan; MTC Bangar; MTC Bauang; MTC Caba; MTC Luna; MTC Naguilian; MTC Rosario; MTC Santo Tomas; MTC Santol; MTC Sudipen; MTCC San Fernando Branches 1 and 2; 1st MCTC (San Juan–San Gabriel); 2nd MCTC (Bagulin–Burgos); 3rd MCTC (Tubao–Pugo)
Laguna	MTC Alaminos; MTC Bay; MTC Calauan; MTC Los Baños; MTC Pagsanjan; MTC Pila; MTC Santa Cruz; MTC Victoria; MTCC Biñan Branches 1, 2 and 3; MTCC Cabuyao; MTCC Calamba Branches 1, 2 and 3; MTCC San Pablo Branches 1, 2 and 3; MTCC San Pedro Branches 1 and 2; MTCC Santa Rosa Branches 1 and 2; 1st MCTC (Luisiana–Cavinti); 2nd MCTC (Magdalena–Liliw–Majayjay); 3rd MCTC (Nagcarlan–Rizal); 4th MCTC (Lumban–Kalaya-an); 5th MCTC (Pangil–Paete–Pakil); 6th MCTC (Siniloan–Famy); 7th MCTC (Santa Maria–Mabitac)
Lanao del Norte	MTC Kapatagan; MTC Sultan Naga Dimaporo; 1st MCTC (Baloi–Pantar–Pantao-Ragat); 2nd MCTC (Linamon–Matungao–Tagoloan); 3rd MCTC (Kauswagan–Poona-Piagapo); 4th MCTC (Maigo–Bacolod–Munai); 5th MCTC (Kolambugan–Tangcal); 6th MCTC (Tubod–Baroy–Magsaysay); 7th MCTC (Lala–Salvador); 8th MCTC (Sapad–Nunungan)
Lanao del Sur	MTC Calanogas; MTCC Marawi Single Sala; 1st MCTC (Saguiaran–Marantao–Kapai–Piagapo–Tagoloan); 2nd MCTC (Balindong–Tugaya–Bacolod Grande–Madalum); 3rd MCTC (Ganassi–Madamba–Pagayawan–Pualas); 4th MCTC (Malabang–Balabagan–Sultan Gumander–Kapatagan); 5th MCTC (Lumbatan–Bayang–Tubaran–Binidayan–Butig–Marogong–Lumbayanagui); 6th MCTC (Poona-Bayabao–Masiu–Tamparan–Taraka); 7th MCTC (Ditsaan-Ramain–Bubong–Buadiposo-Buntong); 8th MCTC (Molundo–Lumba-Bayabao–Maguing); 9th MCTC (Wao–Bumbaran)
Lapu-Lapu City	MTCC Lapu-Lapu City Branches 1, 2 and 3
Las Piñas	MeTC Branches 79, 121, 122, 123 and 124
Leyte	MTC Alang-alang; MTC Albuera; MTC Babatngon; MTC Barauen; MTC Barugo; MTC Carigara; MTC Capoocan; MTC Dagami; MTC Dulag; MTC Hilongos; MTC Jaro; MTC La Paz; MTC Leyte; MTC Mahaplag; MTC Palo; MTC Palompon; MTC Pastrana; MTC Santa Fe; MTC Tanauan; MTC Tolosa; MTCC Baybay Single Sala; MTCC Ormoc Single Sala; 1st MCTC (San Miguel–Tunga); 2nd MCTC (Kananga–Matag-ob); 6th MCTC (Calubian–San Isidro); 7th MCTC (Julita–Tabontabon); 8th MCTC (Hindang–Inopacan); 9th MCTC (Bato–Matalom); 10th MCTC (Merida–Isabel); 11th MCTC (Villaba–Tabango); 12th MCTC (Abuyog–Javier); 13th MCTC (MacArthur–Mayorga)
Lucena	MTCC Lucena Branches 1 and 2
Maguindanao del Norte	MTC Kabuntalan; MTC Sultan Kudarat; 1st MCTC (Parang–Matanog–Buldon–Barira); 2nd MCTC (Datu Odin Sinsuat (Dinaig)–Datu Piang–Talayan); 5th MCTC (Upi–South Upi)
Maguindanao del Sur	MTC Shariff Aguak (Maganoy); 3rd MCTC (Ampatuan–Sultan sa Barongis); 4th MCTC (Pagalungan–Buluan–Pandag–Mangudadatu–Datu Paglas)
Makati	MeTC Branches 61, 62, 63, 64, 65, 66, 67, 125, 126, 127, 128, 129 and 130
Malabon	MeTC Branches 55, 56 and 120
Mandaluyong	MeTC Branches 59, 60, 96, 97, 98, 99, 100, 101, 102, 103, 104, 105 and 106
Mandaue	MTCC Mandaue Branches 1, 2 and 3
Manila	MeTC Branches 1, 2, 3, 4, 5, 6, 7, 8, 9, 10, 11, 12, 13, 14, 15, 16, 17, 18, 19, 20, 21, 22, 23, 24, 25, 26, 27, 28, 29 and 30
Marikina	MeTC Branches 75, 76, 92, 93, 94 and 95
Marinduque	MTC Boac; MTC Buenavista; MTC Gasan; MTC Mogpog; MTC Santa Cruz; MTC Torrijos
Masbate	MTC Claveria; MTC San Pascual; MTCC Masbate City Single Sala; 1st MCTC (Aroroy–Baleno); 2nd MCTC (Mandaon–Balud); 3rd MCTC (San Fernando–Batuan); 4th MCTC (Placer–Cawayan–Esperanza); 5th MCTC (Dimasalang–Palanas–Uson); 6th MCTC (Cataingan–Pio V. Corpuz); 7th MCTC (Mobo–Milagros); 8th MCTC (San Jacinto–Monreal)
Misamis Occidental	MTC Clarin; MTC Lopez Jaena; MTC Plaridel; MTCC Oroquieta Branches 1 and 2; MTCC Ozamis Branches 1, 2 and 3; MTCC Tangub Single Sala; 1st MCTC (Calamba–Baliangao); 2nd MCTC (Sapang Dalaga–Concepcion); 3rd MCTC (Aloran–Panaon–Jimenez); 4th MCTC (Sinacaban–Tudela); 6th MCTC (Bonifacio–Don Mariano Marcos)
Misamis Oriental	MTC Alubijid; MTC Magsaysay; MTC Medina; MTCC El Salvador; MTCC Gingoog Single Sala; 1st MCTC (Balingoan–Talisayan); 2nd MCTC (Salay–Binuangan); 3rd MCTC (Kinoguitan–Sugbungcogon); 4th MCTC (Balingasag–Lagonglong); 5th MCTC (Jasaan–Claveria); 6th MCTC (Tagoloan–Villanueva); 8th MCTC (Initao–Libertad); 9th MCTC (Laguindingan–Gitagum); 10th MCTC (Manticao–Maawan–Lugait)
Mountain Province	MTC Bontoc; MTC Tadian; 1st MCTC (Barlig–Sadanga); 2nd MCTC (Bauko–Sabangan); 3rd MCTC (Sagada–Besao); 4th MCTC (Natonin–Paracelis)
Muntinlupa	MeTC Branches 80, 110, 111, 112, 113 and 114
Naga	MTCC Naga Branches 1, 2 and 3
Navotas	MeTC Branches 54, 118 and 119
Negros Occidental	MTC Binalbagan; MTC Cauayan; MTC Hinigaran; MTC Hinobaan; MTC La Castellana; MTC Pontevedra; MTCC Bago; MTCC Cadiz; MTCC Escalante; MTCC Himamaylan; MTCC Kabankalan; MTCC La Carlota; MTCC Talisay; MTCC Sagay; MTCC San Carlos; MTCC Silay; MTCC Sipalay; MTCC Victorias; 1st MCTC (Calatrava–Toboso); 3rd MCTC (Murcia–Salvador Benedicto); 4th MCTC (Valladolid–San Enrique–Pulupandan); 5th MCTC (Isabela–Moises Padilla); 6th MCTC (Ilog–Candoni); 7th MCTC (Enrique Magalona–Manapla)
Negros Oriental	MTC Mabinay; MTC Santa Catalina; MTC Siaton; MTC Sibulan; MTCC Bais; MTCC Bayawan; MTCC Canlaon; MTCC Dumaguete Branches 1 and 2; MTCC Guihulngan; MTCC Tanjay Single Sala; 1st MCTC (Pamplona–Amlan–San Jose); 2nd MCTC (Bindoy–Ayungon–Manjuyod); 3rd MCTC (Tayasan–Jimalalud); 4th MCTC (La Libertad–Vallehermoso); 5th MCTC (Zamboanguita–Dauin); 7th MCTC (Valencia–Bacong)
Northern Samar	MTC Allen; MTC Bobon; MTC Laoang; MTC Lavezares; MTC Palapag; MTC San Isidro; 1st MCTC (Gamay–Lapinig–Mapanas); 3rd MCTC (Pambujan–Silvino Lobos); 4th MCTC (Catubig–Las Navas); 5th MCTC (Mondragon–San Roque); 6th MCTC (San Jose–Biri–Rosario); 8th MCTC (Victoria–San Antonio); 9th MCTC (Capul–San Vicente); 10th MCTC (Catarman–Lope de Vega)
Nueva Ecija	MTC Aliaga; MTC Bongabon; MTC Carranglan; MTC Cuyapo; MTC General Tinio; MTC Guimba; MTC Jaen; MTC Lupao; MTC Nampicuan; MTC Pantabangan; MTC Peñaranda; MTC Rizal; MTC San Antonio; MTC San Leonardo; MTC Santo Domingo; MTC Talavera; MTC Talugtog; MTC Santa Rosa; MTC Zaragoza; MTCC Cabanatuan Branches 1, 2 and 3; MTCC San Jose Branches 1 and 2; MTCC Gapan Single Sala; MTCC Muñoz Single Sala; MTCC Palayan Single Sala; 1st MCTC (Quezon–Licab); 2nd MCTC (General Mamerto Natividad–Llanera); 3rd MCTC (Laur–Gabaldon); 4th MCTC (Cabiao–San Isidro)
Nueva Vizcaya	MTC Ambaguio; MTC Bambang; MTC Bayombong; MTC Kasibu; MTC Kayapa; MTC Solano; 1st MCTC (Bagabag–Diadi); 2nd MCTC (Dupax del Norte–Dupax del Sur–Alfonso–Castañeda); 3rd MCTC (Villaverde–Quezon); 4th MCTC (Aritao–Santa Fe)
Occidental Mindoro	MTC Mamburao; MTC Sablayan; MTC San Jose; MTC Santa Cruz; 1st MCTC (Abra de Ilog–Paluan); 2nd MCTC (Lubang–Looc); 3rd MCTC (Magsaysay–Rizal–Calintaan)
Olongapo	MTCC Olongapo Branches 1, 2, 3, 4 and 5
Oriental Mindoro	MTC Bansud; MTC Bongabong; MTC Bulalacao; MTC Gloria; MTC Mansalay; MTC Naujan; MTC Pinamalayan; MTC Pola; MTC Roxas; MTC Socorro; MTC Victoria; MTCC Calapan Single Sala; 1st MCTC (San Teodoro–Baco–Puerto Galera)
Palawan	MTC Aborlan; MTC Culion; MTC El Nido; MTC Narra; 1st MCTC (Cuyo–Agutaya–Magsaysay); 2nd MCTC (Coron–Busuanga–Gaudencio E. Abordo); 3rd MCTC (Taytay–San Vicente); 4th MCTC (Araceli–Dumaran); 5th MCTC (Roxas–Cagayancillo); 6th MCTC (Quezon–Dr. Jose P. Rizal–Kalayaan); 7th MCTC (Brooke's Point–Española–Bataraza–Balabac)
Pampanga	MTC Arayat; MTC Bacolor; MTC Clark Field; MTC Floridablanca; MTC Guagua Branches 1 and 2; MTC Lubao; MTC Magalang; MTC Porac; MTC Santa Rita; MTC Sasmuan; MTCC San Fernando Branches 1, 2, 3 and 4; MTCC Mabalacat Single Sala; 1st MCTC (Santa Ana–Candaba); 2nd MCTC (Mexico–San Luis); 3rd MCTC (Santo Tomas–Minalin); 4th MCTC (Masantol–Macabebe); 5th MCTC (Apalit–San Simon)
Pangasinan	MTC Agno; MTC Anda; MTC Balungao; MTC Bani; MTC Bayambang; MTC Binmaley; MTC Bolinao; MTC Calasiao; MTC Infanta; MTC Lingayen; MTC Malasiqui; MTC Manaoag; MTC Mangaldan; MTC Mangatarem; MTC Mapandan; MTC Rosales; MTC Santa Barbara; MTC Santa Maria; MTC Umingan; MTCC Alaminos; MTCC San Carlos; MTCC Urdaneta; 1st MCTC (Burgos–Mabini–Dasol); 2nd MCTC (Labrador–Sual); 3rd MCTC (Aguilar–Bugallon); 4th MCTC (San Fabian–San Jacinto); 5th MCTC (Urbiztondo–Basista); 6th MCTC (Pozorrubio–Sison); 7th MCTC (Asingan–San Manuel); 8th MCTC (Alcala–Bautista); 9th MCTC (Tayug–San Nicolas); 10th MCTC (Natividad–San Quintin); 11th MCTC (Villasis–Santo Tomas); 12th MCTC (Binalonan–Laoac)
Parañaque	MeTC Branches 77, 78, 87, 88, 89, 90 and 91
Pasay	MeTC Branches 44, 45, 46, 47, 48, 165, 166, 167, 168 and 169
Pasig	MeTC Branches 68, 69, 70, 71, 72, 153, 154, 155, 156, 157, 158, 159, 160, 161, 162, 163 and 164
Pateros	MeTC Branch 73
Puerto Princesa	MTCC Puerto Princesa Branches 1, 2 and 3
Quezon	MTC Calauag; MTC Candelaria; MTC Catanauan; MTC Dolores; MTC General Luna; MTC Guinayangan; MTC Gumaca; MTC Lopez; MTC Lucban; MTC Macalelon; MTC Mulanay; MTC Pagbilao; MTC Pitogo; MTC Real; MTC San Antonio; MTC Sariaya; MTC Tagkawayan; MTC Tiaong; MTC Unisan; MTCC Tayabas Single Sala; 1st MCTC (Mauban–Sampaloc); 3rd MCTC (Padre Burgos–Agdangan); 4th MCTC (Infanta–General Nakar); 5th MCTC (Polillo–Panukulan); 6th MCTC (Burdeos–Jumalig–Patnanungan); 7th MCTC (Atimonan–Plaridel); 8th MCTC (Alabat–Quezon–Perez); 9th MCTC (San Narciso–Buenavista); 10th MCTC (San Francisco–San Andres)
Quezon City	MeTC Branches 31, 32, 33, 34, 35, 36, 37, 38, 39, 40, 41, 42, 43, 131, 132, 133, 134, 135, 136, 137, 138, 139, 140, 141, 142, 143, 144, 145, 146, 147, 148, 149, 150, 151 and 152
Quirino	MTC Cabarroguis; MTC Diffun; 1st MCTC (Aglipay–Saguday); 2nd MCTC (Maddela–Nagtipunan)
Rizal	MTC Angono; MTC Binangonan Branches 1 and 2; MTC Cainta; MTC Cardona; MTC Morong; MTC Rodriguez (Montalban); MTC San Mateo; MTC Tanay; MTC Taytay; MTCC Antipolo Branches 1, 2, 3, 4 and 5; 1st MCTC (Pililla–Jala-Jala); 2nd MCTC (Teresa–Baras)
Romblon	MTC Romblon; 1st MCTC (San Andres–Calatrava); 2nd MCTC (Corcuera–Concepcion–Banton); 3rd MCTC (Looc–Alcantara–Santa Fe–San Jose); 4th MCTC (Cajidiocan–Magdiwang–San Fernando); 5th MCTC (Odiongan–Ferrol); 6th MCTC (San Agustin–Santa Maria)
Samar	MTC Basey; MTC Marabut; MTCC Calbayog Single Sala; MTCC Catbalogan Single Sala; 1st MCTC (Santa Margarita–Santo Niño–Almagro–Tagapul-an); 2nd MCTC (Tarangnan–Pagsanjan); 3rd MCTC (Gandara–Matuguinao–San Jorge); 4th MCTC (Motiong–Jiabong–San Jose de Buan); 5th MCTC (Wright (Paranas)–San Sebastian); 6th MCTC (Villareal–Pinabacdao); 7th MCTC (Calbiga–Hinabangan); 8th MCTC (Daram–Zumarraga); 9th MCTC (Santa Rita–Talalora)
San Juan	MeTC Branches 57 and 58
Santiago	MTCC Santiago Branches 1 and 2
Sarangani	MTC Maasim; 1st MCTC (Glan–Malapatan); 2nd MCTC (Malungon–Alabel); 3rd MCTC (Kiamba–Maitum)
Siquijor	1st MCTC (Siquijor–Enrique Villanueva–Larena); 2nd MCTC (Lazi–Maria–San Juan)
Sorsogon	MTC Bulan; MTC Castilla; MTC Donsol; MTC Irosin; MTC Magallanes; MTC Pilar; MTCC Sorsogon City Branches 1 and 2; 1st MCTC (Casiguran–Juban); 2nd MCTC (Bulusan–Barcelona); 3rd MCTC (Matnog–Santa Magdalena); 4th MCTC (Gubat–Prieto Diaz)
South Cotabato	MTC Polomolok; MTC Tampakan; MTC Tupi; MTCC Koronadal Single Sala; 1st MCTC (Norala–T'boli–Santo Niño); 2nd MCTC (Banga–Tantangan); 6th MCTC (Surallah–Lake Sebu)
Southern Leyte	MTC Liloan; MTC San Francisco; MTCC Maasin Single Sala; 1st MCTC (Macrohon–Padre Burgos–Limasawa); 2nd MCTC (Malitbog–Tomas Oppus); 3rd MCTC (Sogod–Libagon–Bontoc); 4th MCTC (San Juan–Saint Bernard); 5th MCTC (Anahawan–Hinundayan); 6th MCTC (Hinunangan–Silago); 7th MCTC (Pintuyan–San Ricardo)
Sultan Kudarat	MTC Isulan; MTC Palimbang; MTCC Tacurong Single Sala; 1st MCTC (Lebak–Kalamansig); 2nd MCTC (Lutayan–Columbio–President Quirino–Lambayong); 4th MCTC (Bagumbayan)
Sulu	MTC Jolo; 1st MCTC (Indanan–Parang–Maimbong–Arolas Tulawie (Talipao)); 2nd MCTC (Patikul–Panamao–Marungas–Pangutaran–New Panamao); 3rd MCTC (Luuk–Kalingalan–Calauang); 4th MCTC (Siasi–Tapul–Lugus–Pata–Tongkil–Lapak (Pandami))
Surigao del Norte	MTC Mainit; MTCC Surigao City Branches 1 and 2; 1st MCTC (Malimono–San Francisco); 2nd MCTC (Sison–Tagana-an); 3rd MCTC (Placer–Bacuag); 4th MCTC (Claver–Gigaquit); 5th MCTC (Tubod–Alegria); 6th MCTC (Dapa–Socorro); 7th MCTC (General Luna–Pilar); 8th MCTC (Del Carmen (Numancia)–San Isidro–San Benito); 9th MCTC (Santa Monica–Burgos)
Surigao del Sur	MTCC Bislig Single Sala; MTCC Tandag Single Sala; 1st MCTC (Cantilan–Carrascal); 2nd MCTC (Lanuza–Cortes–Madrid–Carmen); 3rd MCTC (Tago–San Miguel); 4th MCTC (Cagwait–Bayabas); 5th MCTC (Marihatag–San Agustin); 6th MCTC (Barobo–Lianga); 7th MCTC (Hinatuan–Tagbina)
Tacloban	MTCC Tacloban Branches 1 and 2
Taguig	MeTC Branches 74, 115, 116 and 117
Tarlac	MTC Camiling; MTC Paniqui; MTCC Tarlac City Branches 1 and 2; 1st MCTC (Santa Ignacia–Mayantoc–San Clemente–San Jose); 2nd MCTC (Capas–Bamban–Concepcion); 3rd MCTC (Victoria–La Paz); 4th MCTC (Moncada–San Manuel–Anao); 5th MCTC (Gerona–Ramos–Pura)
Tawi-Tawi	1st MCTC (Simunul–Balimbing–Panglima Sugala); 2nd MCTC (Sitangkai–Sibutu); 3rd MCTC (Tandubas–South Ubian–Sapa-Sapa); 4th MCTC (Mapun–Turtle Islands); 5th MCTC (Bongao–Languyan)
Valenzuela	MeTC Branches 81, 82, 107, 108 and 109
Zambales	MTC Iba; MTC San Antonio; MTC San Felipe; MTC San Narciso; MTC Subic; 1st MCTC (Santa Cruz–Candelaria); 2nd MCTC (Masinloc–Palauig); 3rd MCTC (Botolan–Cabangan); 4th MCTC (San Marcelino–Castillejos)
Zamboanga City	MTCC Zamboanga City Branches 1, 2, 3 and 4
Zamboanga del Norte	MTC Manuel A. Roxas; MTC Manukan; MTC Mutia; MTC Polanco; MTC Sibuco; MTCC Dapitan Single Sala; MTCC Dipolog Branches 1 and 2; 1st MCTC (Sibutad–Rizal); 2nd MCTC (Piñan–La Libertad); 3rd MCTC (Sindangan–Siayan–Leon Postigo (Bacungan)–Jose Dalman (Ponot)); 4th MCTC (Siocon–Baliguian–Siraway); 5th MCTC (Katipunan–Sergio Osmeña Sr.); 6th MCTC (Labason–Gutalac–Kalawit); 7th MCTC (Liloy–Tampilisan); 9th MCTC (Salug–Godod)
Zamboanga del Sur	MTC Aurora; MTC Molave; MTC Tambulig; MTCC Pagadian Branches 1 and 2; 6th MCTC (San Miguel–Dinas–Lapuyan); 7th MCTC (Dimataling–Tabina–Pitogo); 8th MCTC (Dumalinao–San Pablo–Tigbao–Guipos); 9th MCTC (Labangan–Tukuran); 10th MCTC (Ramon Magsaysay–Midsalip–Sominot); 11th MCTC (Mahayag–Dumingag–Josefina); 13th MCTC (Kumalarang–Lake Wood–Bayog); 15th MCTC (Margosatubig–Vicenzo Sagun)
Zamboanga Sibugay	MTC Alicia; MTC Buug; 1st MCTC (Ipil–Tungawan–Roseller T. Lim); 2nd MCTC (Naga–Titay); 3rd MCTC (Kabasalan–Siay); 4th MCTC (Olutanga–Mabuhay–Talusan); 5th MCTC (Imelda–Malangas–Diplahan–Payao)

== Special courts ==
Some courts have been created by law to deal with specific types of cases, with their rulings restricted to this specific jurisdiction.

=== Specialized regional courts ===
Some regional courts are specifically assigned to handle certain types of cases with their relevant geographical area. Some are designated as a "Family Court", with jurisdiction over cases involving children. Others have been designated "Heinous Crime Courts", dealing with cases involving kidnapping, certain forms of robbery, drug crimes, intellectual property rights, and libel. In 2008 some were designated to deal with environmental cases.

=== Court of Tax Appeals ===
The Court of Tax Appeals (CTA) both has original jurisdiction and is an appellate court for matters related to taxes. The court is led by a presiding justice, and has eight associate justices. It is an appellate court, equal to the Court of Appeals.

=== Sandiganbayan ===
The Sandiganbayan operates out of the Centennial building, which lies on Commonwealth Avenue, Quezon City.

The Sandiganbayan is a special court set up to deal with instances of corruption involving a government official or an official in a government-owned body. It also has jurisdiction over other crimes committed by public officials, if these felonies relate to their office. The court is led by a presiding justice, and with the presiding justice, is composed of 14 associate justices. It is considered equal to the Court of Appeals. The Sandiganbayan was originally established as the Tanodbayan under the 1973 constitution.

Cases are filed at the Sandibanbayan by the Ombudsman. The Ombudsman is tasked with investigating official corruption, and can prosecute all public officials and agencies aside from the President, who is immune from such prosecution while in office. The Ombudsman and their deputies are selected by the President from a list provided by the Judicial and Bar Council, with the Ombudsman requiring ten years of experience as a judge or lawyer. The President has no ability to appoint individuals from outside of this list. These appointments do not require confirmation from the legislature. Terms of office last seven years, and an Ombudsman cannot be reappointed.

=== Sharia courts ===
Sharia district courts (ShDC), which rule on Islamic law, have limited jurisdiction over cases relating to Muslims. They also have limited territorial jurisdiction, which is determined by the Supreme Court. They are present only in five judicial regions, all areas of Southwest Mindanao. They are equivalent to regional trial courts, and were established under the "Code of Muslim Personal Laws of the Philippines" (Presidential Decree No. 1083) to handle personal relations between Muslims. Sharia courts have original jurisdiction over a number of issues relating to Sharia. They also have concurrent jurisdiction over some matters that fall within the jurisdiction of civil courts, but only where all parties are Muslims. One exception is that cases can be filed in Sharia courts by non-Muslim women married to a Muslim man through Islamic rites. Sharia circuit courts (ShCC) have the same rank as Municipal Circuit Trial Courts Sharia District Courts are theoretically overseen by a Sharia appellate court, but it has not been established, leaving their decisions instead reviewed by the Supreme Court.

=== Military courts ===
Cases involving the military are handled by civil courts, except when the offense is determined to be service-oriented by a civil court. In that case, it shall be tried by court-martial. Under martial law, military courts may try civilians if no civilian courts are functional.

== Quasi-judicial bodies ==
A quasi-judicial body can adjudicate on matters of law, but only through existing legal basis. They have no actual judicial power. These include:

- Agricultural Inventions Board
- Board of Investments
- Bureau of Patents, Trademarks and Technology Transfer
- Central Board of Assessment Appeal
- Civil Aeronautics Board
- Civil Service Commission
- Commission on Audit
- Commission on Elections
- Construction Industry Arbitration Commission
- Department of Agrarian Reform
- Employees Compensation Commission
- Energy Regulatory Board
- Government Service Insurance System
- Human Settlements Adjudication Commission
- Insurance Commission
- Land Registration Authority
- National Electrification Administration
- National Labor Relations Commission
- National Police Commission
- National Telecommunications Commission
- Office of the President
- Philippine Competition Commission
- Philippine Atomic Energy Commission
- Securities and Exchange Commission
- Social Security Commission
- Tariff Commission

The decisions of these bodies are appealed to an appellate court.

== Electoral tribunals ==
There are electoral tribunals for the presidency and Congress. The Presidential Electoral Tribunal is composed of the justices of the Supreme Court. The Senate Electoral Tribunal is composed of three associate justices of the Supreme Court, and six senators. The House of Representatives Electoral Tribunal is composed of three associate justices of the Supreme Court, and six representatives. The composition of the six representatives from both houses should reflect the proportional distribution of political parties in Congress.

== Independence ==
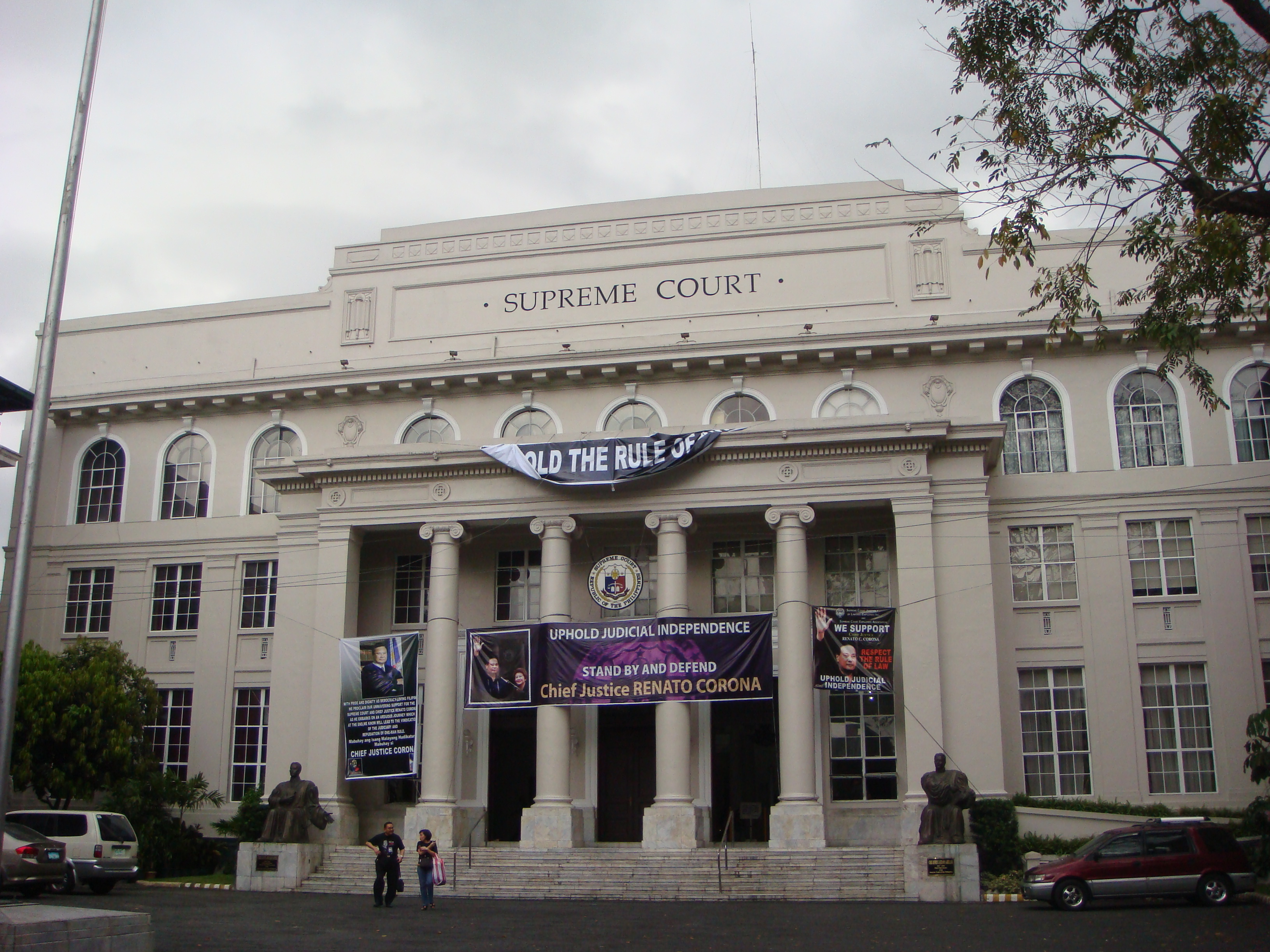
Banners handing outside the Supreme Court during the impeachment of Renato Corona.

The Judiciary is a co-equal branch of Government to the Executive and the Legislature. Under the 1987 constitution, Judicial terms of office are out of sync with other offices such as the President of the Philippines, to promote independence. The President appoints individuals to the judiciary. Appointments to the judiciary are recommended by the Judicial and Bar Council (JBC) to the President. For the Supreme Court, the President is required to select justices from a shortlist prepared by the JBC, which must include at least three people. However, there have been instances where the President has rejected a shortlist entirely and requested a new one. The JBC was created to further separate the judiciary from political influence, with judges previously being approved by Congress. However, the President has direct influence in the JBC, and can appoint half of its members. Political pressure has also been observed in court decisions, causing inconsistency between different cases.

The constitution prevents the President from appointing individuals in the last two months of their term, however a 2010 Supreme Court ruling established that this prohibition did not apply to judicial appointments, overturning previous court rulings under which the prohibition did apply. This majority for this ruling consisted of appointees of President Gloria Macapagal Arroyo, whose unusually long term in office undermined some of the constitutional guards against undue Presidential influence in other branches of government. The next Chief Justice, Renato Corona, was appointed following this ruling, an appointment which also broke with the traditional precedent whereby the most senior associate justice became the next Chief Justice, which had been in place since the end of martial law. Corona was not recognized by subsequent President Benigno Aquino III, although his executive order cancelling the late appointments justified by the 2010 Supreme Court ruling was reversed by the Supreme Court. Aquino subsequently bypassed seniority in other judicial appointments. Judges must retire at age 70.

There is also some legislative oversight of the judicial system, with the legislature able to carry out impeachment proceedings. The first attempt to impeach a Chief Justice, in 2003, was quashed by the Supreme Court. Corona was impeached in 2012, the first time a Chief Justice had been impeached in Philippine history. His successor, Maria Lourdes Sereno, also had impeachment proceedings brought against her. However, she was removed from office through quo warranto proceedings, before any impeachment proceedings took place.

The Office of the Solicitor General is an independent body that represents the government in legal cases.

== Judicial corruption ==
Corruption in the Philippine judicial system is also a major problem. Bribery and irregular payments in return for favorable judicial decisions are quite common. Although judicial officials are independent by law, rich and powerful groups and individuals wield control and influence over the judicial system and influence the outcomes of civil and criminal proceedings. Financial investment dispute often take an unnecessarily long time due to staffing shortages, lack of resources, and corruption in the court system. The low salaries of judicial officials help exacerbate the problem of bribery in exchange for favors. The judiciary is also criticized for making non-transparent and biased judicial decisions.
