= Divorce in the Philippines =

Divorce is a contentious issue in the Philippines, which is predominantly Catholic even though other states of similar religious makeup have legalized it. Dissolution of marriage through divorce is not typically legally available to Filipino citizens, and annulment is the usual legal alternative. The Muslim Personal Code allows for divorce under specific circumstances for couples who married in Islamic rites. The Philippines is often cited as the "only country in the world" where divorce is illegal, aside from the Vatican City after Malta legalized divorce in 2011.

Couples may also opt for legal separation, alternatively referred to as "relative divorce", although this process does not dissolve the marriage. Relative divorce is contrasted with "absolute divorce", a setup where previously married individuals are allowed to remarry.

There have been several attempts to legalize absolute divorce in the Philippine Congress.

== History ==
=== Spanish colonial era ===
During the Spanish era in the Philippines, absolute divorce was unrecognized or not allowed during the spanish colonial period(1565-1898). The colony was under the jurisdiction of the Siete Partidas, which only ever granted couples "relative divorce," which is mensa et thoro or legal separation and does not legally dissolve actual marital ties. The following are prerequisites for a relative divorce under the Siete Partidas:

- One spouse seeks to enter religious life with consent from the other
- Adultery has been committed by either spouse
- Heresy has been demonstrated by one of the spouses, or the spouse has converted to Islam or Judaism
- Apostasy abandoning the catholic faith
- ill treatment physical abuse or violence that endangered life

=== American colonial era ===
The United States would colonize the Philippines after the conclusion of the Spanish–American War. During this period, Act No. 2710, or the Divorce Law, became law on March 11, 1917. The legislation provided for divorce a vinculo matrimonii or absolute divorce. Divorce permissibility was fault-based, with the following prerequisite.

- Adultery must have been committed by the wife, with criminal conviction
- Concubinage must have been committed by the husband, with criminal conviction

=== Japanese occupation ===
When the Empire of Japan occupied the Philippines during the World War II, the Japanese-installed Philippine Executive Commission issued Executive Order No. 141 on March 25, 1943, which repealed Act No. 2710 and expanded the divorce law in the archipelago through the new decree providing eleven grounds for a valid absolute divorce. Following the end of Axis occupation of the islands and the revival of the Philippine Commonwealth on October 23, 1944 by General Douglas MacArthur, Act No. 2710 once again became the prevailing law on divorce matters in the Philippines.

=== Post-Commonwealth and contemporary era ===
Following the Philippine independence from the United States in the Philippines in 1946, Act No. 2710 remained applicable for a time. Until the enactment of the Republic Act No. 386 or the Civil Code on August 30, 1950 which only allowed for legal separation or what was before known as 'relative divorce' and does not allow for absolute divorce. The grounds were adultery/concubinage by a spouse, and an attempt on one's life of one spouse over another. There was deliberation within the Code Commission to include provisions on absolute divorce which was opposed by conservatives.

The Civil Code would be updated through the Family Code in 1987 but the newer law did not allow for absolute divorce. The Civil Code allows divorce for Muslims for a period of twenty years.

In 1977, President Ferdinand Marcos enacted the Code of Muslim Personal Laws which included absolute divorce provisions for Muslims.

Presidents Gloria Macapagal Arroyo, Benigno Aquino III, and Rodrigo Duterte expressed they would not support the passage of an absolute divorce bill during their terms, although Aquino mentioned he was open to a 'legal separation' law which would allow couples to remarry.

President Bongbong Marcos has said he was open to legalizing divorce when he was still a candidate for the 2022 presidential election, provided that the option is not made "easy".

==== Judicial recognition of foreign divorce decree and declaration of capacity to remarry ====
The Family Code allows Philippine courts to recognize any divorce obtained by Filipinos from foreign spouses overseas, on condition the proceeding is valid under the law of the foreign spouse's country. In addition, a regional trial court can take cognizance of a conjunctive petition for declaration of the capacity to remarry.

A widely-known example of this is the case of former celebrity couple Carla Abellana and Tom Rodriguez. Rodriguez is a United States citizen, and it is unclear if he had reacquired Filipino citizenship. A publication about the topic implied it was not possible both of them had Filipino citizenship at the time of divorce.

== By custom or rite ==
=== Indigenous peoples ===
Several indigenous peoples' cultures recognize divorce as a means to dissolve marriages including the Ibaloi of Benguet, Tagbanwa of Palawan, Gaddangs of Nueva Vizcaya, the Kankanaeys and Bontocs of the Cordilleras, and the Manobos and B'laans of Mindanao. However, the dissolution of marriages conducted in indigenous rites through divorce are not recognized by the government.

=== Muslims ===
The Code of Muslim Personal Laws of 1977 allows divorce for Filipino Muslims, many of whom identify as the Moro people. Divorce is unavailable for Muslims, including converts, who are married under the Civil Code.

=== Transnational marriages ===
Where a non-Filipino is married to a Filipino citizen and a divorce is obtained overseas by the non-Filipino spouse, the Filipino spouse can remarry under Philippine law (see judicial recognition of foreign divorce decree and declaration of capacity to remarry), even if the non-Filipino spouse acquired foreign citizenship after the marriage.

== Legalization ==
=== Current proposals ===
The following are the current proposals to legalize divorce in the current 19th Congress of the Philippines.

- Instituting absolute divorce and dissolution of marriage in the Philippines / House Bill No. 4998 – by Davao del Norte 1st district representative Pantaleon Alvarez;
- Dissolution of Marriage Act (2022) – by Senator Risa Hontiveros; no-fault divorce; proof of criminal offense or 'psychological incapacity' of one party would not be required.
- Unnumbered consolidated bill – absence of no-fault provision, excluded chronic unhappiness as grounds.
- Senate Bill 2443 - On September 20, 2023, the Philippine Senate Committee on Women, Children, Family Relations and Gender Equality Panel's Committee Report 124 recommended the approval of Senate Bill 2443 It is a substitution of consolidated Senate Bills 147, 213, 237, 554, 555, 1198 and 2047 on the "Dissolution of Marriage Act" sponsored by committee chair Sen. Risa Hontiveros. The bill defines absolute divorce as the “legal termination of a marriage by a court in a legal proceeding.”

=== Absolute Divorce Act ===
On May 15, 2024, the House of Representatives in a plenary session presided by Aurelio Gonzales Jr. via voice vote approved on "Second Reading" "Edcel Lagman" House Bill 9349, the proposed "Absolute Divorce Act". As the spouses' fourth way to separate, the bill enumerated limited grounds of the petition as defined by Loreto B. Acharon: Article 45 of the Family Code on annulment of marriage, spouses' de facto 5 years separation, gender-affirming surgery by a spouse or gender transition, psychological incapacity under Article 36 of the Family Code, irreconcilable differences, domestic, marital abuse or physical violence under Republic Act 9262, the Violence against women and Their Children Act of 2004 and moral pressure to change religious or political affiliation. The legal separation grounds under the Article 97 of the New Civil Code of the Philippines (2) and Article 55 of the Family Code of the Philippines (10) are also, for now, absolute divorce grounds. The bill also provides validity recognition of a foreign divorce decree by either the alien or Filipino spouse with proper authentication by the Philippine Consul.

== Opposition ==
The legalization of divorce has been opposed on religious grounds, with the Catholic Church and conservative churches being the most vocal opponents.

Opponents of legalization of divorce have also argued that the state sanctioning such process is unconstitutional on the basis of the provision which mandates the state to uphold the "sanctity of marriage and its being the foundation of the family".

== Views of religious groups ==
=== Catholic Church ===
The Catholic Church in the Philippines through the Catholic Bishops' Conference of the Philippines (CBCP) has historically lobbied against any legislation to legalize absolute divorce in the country viewing the sanction of the state of such process as "anti-marriage" and "anti-family". It maintains that the process of legal separation and annulment for aggrieved married couples are sufficient.

Socrates Villegas, the CBCP President in 2015, in a published position argued that legalizing divorce is contrary to human rights, especially of children of divorce couples. He said that allowing divorce would deter couples from working on their relationship first. He added that children whose married parents availed legal separation are already traumatized and that divorce would allow "a total stranger" to enter their lives in a form of a new legal spouse which would make their situation worse. In May 2024, the CBCP's Fr. Jerome Secillano told the Philippine Daily Inquirer that it strongly opposes the bill's approval for being "anti-family, anti-marriage and anti-children and a betrayal of their constitutional mandate to uphold marriage and the family.”

The Catholic lay ecclesial movement Couples for Christ also strongly opposes any divorce law in the Philippines. In June 2024, it published a manifesto stating "Marriages formed in love and mutual understanding can be happy, enduring, and fulfilling." It stressed that single parent children become victims of parental breakup resulting in permanent emotional, psychological, financial or even physical social stigma.

=== Other Christian groups ===
The Iglesia ni Cristo prohibits its members from availing divorce, and maintains that couples in troubled marriages should settle their differences.

Bishop Modesto Villasanta of the United Church of Christ in the Philippines (UCCP) meanwhile expressed his group is open to discussing the issue of divorce. Villasanta added it is "up to the Church on how they will teach their people the importance of marriage and not on barring its (a divorce bill's) approval".

== Alternatives to divorce ==
While divorce is largely not recognized by the state, marriages can be ended in the Philippines through annulment or declaring it null and void. Couples can also avail of legal separation.

| Method | Grounds | Limitations | Notes |
|---|---|---|---|
| Legal separation | Repeated violence and physical abuse; Sexual infidelity; Conviction of a criminal offense with a penalty of more than six years; Abandonment | Either parties cannot remarry or have sexual relations with a third party | |
| Declaration of nullity of marriage | Nonvalid marriages; Minors married without parental consent; Married by an unauthorized person; Bigamous marriages; 'Mistaken identity'; Incestuous marriages | Children arising from couples under voided marriages are considered as illegitimate | |
| Annulment (Civil) | Minors married without parental consent; Individuals who have been of 'unsound mind' at the time of marriages; Couples married under 'deceitful circumstances'; Included failure of one to inform the other party: Infliction of a sexually transmitted disease; Pregnancy involving another man; Criminal conviction of one party; Addiction; Impotence; Homosexuality; 'Psychological incapacity' of one party which caused the inability to perform one's marital obligations (e.g. Philippine Law school staple "Chi Ming Tsoi" case) | Annulment sought from religious institutions does not automatically void marriages. | Marriage is considered valid by the state until the point it was annulled |

== Opinion polling ==
Divorce for couples who are "irreconcilably separated"
| Date | For | Against | Undecided | Conducted by | Ref. |
|---|---|---|---|---|---|
| May 2005 | 43% | 45% | 12% | Social Weather Stations | |
| March 2011 | 50% | 32% | 16% | Social Weather Stations | |
| December 2014 | 60% | 29% | 11% | Social Weather Stations | |
| March 2015 | 48% | 35% | 17% | Social Weather Stations | |
| September 2016 | 55% | 30% | 14% | Social Weather Stations | |
| March 2017 | 51% | 32% | 17% | Social Weather Stations | |
| December 2017 | 55% | 31% | 14% | Social Weather Stations | |
| December 2019 | 50% | 39% | 12% | Social Weather Stations | |
| September 2021 | 46% | 36% | 17% | Social Weather Stations | |
| March 2023 | 65% | 21% | 15% | Social Weather Stations | |
| June 2023 | 55% | 27% | 17% | Social Weather Stations | |
| March 2024 | 50% | 32% | 17% | Social Weather Stations | |

== See also ==
- Divorce law by country
- Marriage and wedding customs in the Philippines
- Single mother phenomenon of Philippines
