= Code of Muslim Personal Laws =

1977 legislation in the Philippines

- Long title: A Decree to Ordainand Promulgate a Code Recognizing the System of Filipino Muslim Laws, Codifying Muslim Personal Laws, and Providing for its Administration and for Other Purposes
- Citation: Presidential Decree No. 1083, s. 1977
- Territorial extent: Philippines
- Signed by: Ferdinand Marcos
- Signed: February 4, 1977
- Commenced: February 4, 1977
- Status: Not fully in force

The Code of Muslim Personal Laws is a legislation in the Philippines covering Muslims in the country which came into effect through Presidential Decree No. 1083 in 1977.

== Background ==
The Code of Muslim Personal Laws, otherwise known as Presidential Decree No. 1083, was enacted by President Ferdinand Marcos on February 7, 1977. The decree was enacted upon the advice of the now-defunct Commission on National Integration since Muslims (along with non-Christian indigenous peoples) would have only been allowed to get married under their customs and traditions until 1980 as originally stipulated in the Civil Code of the Philippines. The law recognized Sharia as part of the larger legal system of the country – although it only deals with Muslim customary and personal laws and exclude criminal law.

== Key provisions ==
=== Marriage ===
==== Islamic marriage ====
The Code of Muslim Personal Laws covers marriage done under Islamic rites. The same also allows Muslims to avail of divorce contrary to the Family Code of the Philippines which bars most non-Muslim Filipinos from legally ending their marriage. Divorce between a non-Muslim and a Muslim is also recognized such as the divorce case of a Christian woman and a Muslim man who were married under Islamic rites which was upheld in 2016 by the Supreme Court.

Under the Muslim code a husband may seek for a "perpetual divorce" from his wife or invoke li'an to end his marriage if his spouse commits adultery. The wife may seek the termination of her marriage with her husband by invoking faskh if certain conditions are met including if her spouse commits "unusual cruelty", suffers from insanity or affliction of an incurable disease, or for six consecutive months neglects family support. Talaq divorce "may be effected by the husband in a single repudiation of his wife" after totally abstaining from sexual relations with his spouse.

While polygamy is allowed under the code, a Muslim man could only marry a second wife with permission of a sharia court and could still be charged with bigamy without satisfying this prerequisite. Also men who had their first union made through civil marriage and subsequently marries a second woman, even through Islamic rite, could still be charged with bigamy. Converts who already has an active marriage done under non-Islamic rite cannot circumvent this law through mere conversion.

==== Early marriage ====
Early marriage, often referred to child marriage, was permissible under the Code of Muslim Personal Laws under certain conditions. This runs counter to the Family Code of the Philippines which sets the marriageable age regardless of sex to 18 years old. The Code of Muslim Personal Laws allowed for Filipino Muslim minors of at least 15 years to get married and a Sharia court was allowed to consent the marriage of a Muslim girl as young as 12 years old who has attained puberty.

Child marriage in the context of Islamic tradition refers to a form of relationship involves at least one party is an adolescence who is usually at least 13 years of age rather than a child hence it is referred to as "early marriage". A Muslim girl who already had menstruation could already get married as per Islamic tradition.

The provision regarding early marriage under the Code of Muslim Personal Laws was overridden by Republic Act No. 11596 or the Prohibition of Child Marriage Law which criminalized child marriage, including its facilitation and solemnization, and cohabitation of an adult with a child outside wedlock. The legislation was signed into law by President Rodrigo Duterte in December 2021.

=== Sharia courts ===
Under the Code of Muslim Personal Laws, five Shari'ah District Courts were established in the Philippines, all of which has territorial jurisdiction over areas in Mindanao. The Shari'ah District Court is roughly equivalent to the Regional Trial Court in the regular and secular Philippine court system.

=== Public holidays ===
The Code of Muslim Personal Laws allows for select localities in Mindanao to observe Muslim legal holidays. It also has a provision which would allow Muslim government employees outside these areas to excuse themselves from work.

== See also ==
- Sharia in the Philippines
