= Concubinage (law) =

Legal term describing cohabitation by romantic partners outside of marriage

In contemporary civil law, concubinage is a legal term that is sometimes used for an interpersonal, intimate relationship between a man and a woman, or, depending on the jurisdiction, unmarried couple, in which the couple wish to cohabit, but do not want to or cannot enter into a full marriage.

In the legal system of the Philippines, concubinage also has a distinct criminal usage in the 1930 Revised Penal Code, relating to adultery. It is quite distinct from other legal usage.

The term concubinage also has a wider usage as a term relating to the keeping of concubines that has been applied to a wide variety of historical situations that have entailed various degrees of freedom, power and privilege for the women involved. In the twenty-first century, the term has come primarily to refer either to an extramarital mistress or a sex slave.

== Etymology ==
The use of the word concubinage as a legal term comes from the related Latin legal term concubinatus, which in ancient Rome regulated the “permanent cohabitation” of a “monogamous union between a man and a woman” who were not legally married. Though similar to legal marriage, these relationships carried fewer benefits.

== Roman legal history ==
Under Roman Law, where monogamy was expected, concubinage was an institution that did not translate into rights to property, inheritance or social rank, though the practice was equally not viewed unfavourably. There were terms for both the female (concubina) and the male (concubinus) for the beholden parties in such arrangements. (Note: See Concŭbīnus. Charlton T. Lewis and Charles Short. A Latin Dictionary on Perseus Project.) The title concubina was often inscribed on tombstones by mourners of the deceased.

The advent of Christianity brought “profound change” and spelled the end for the Roman institution of concubinage by promoting monogamous marriage and denigrating sexual relations outside of marriage as illegitimate and immoral.

== Modern jurisdictions ==
=== France ===
In France, direct parallels are drawn between the meaning of concubinage in Roman law and its contemporary usage as a synonym for civil union, where it is derived from the Napoleonic Code. (Note: Article 515-8 of the Civil Code defines concubinage as "a de facto union, characterized by a shared life and a character of stability and continuity, between two persons of different or same sex, who live as a couple" ("une union de fait, caractérisée par une vie commune présentant un caractère de stabilité et de continuité, entre deux personnes, de sexe différent ou de même sexe, qui vivent en couple"). See also Concubinage en France (in French).) While the Napoleonic Code or French Civil Code defined concubinage, it did not, however, address their status, with Napoleon Bonaparte, at the time of the drafting, stating, "As concubines are not interested in the law, the law shall not have to take interest in them."

Instead, the current legal terminology and usage of concubinage in French law owe their existence to a 1970 landmark decision by the Cour de Cassation, which "broke with precedent by concluding that opposite-sex concubines or cohabitants could claim compensation for their loss following the accidental death of their partners due to the actions of a third party." Following legislative developments also conferred rights to cohabitants in areas such as parentage (filiation in French law), welfare, taxation and, finally, penal law, with the decriminalization of adultery in 1975.

In 1999, concubinage was legally recognized for both opposite and same-sex couples and article 515-8 of the French Civil Code now defines it as a "union of fact, characterized by a shared life presenting a character of stability and continuity, between two persons, of different sexes or of the same sex, who live as a couple". Since the 1999 ruling, the term concubinage, which is "mostly viewed in a negative way", has increasingly fallen out of favour and been replaced in general usage with the term cohabitation.

=== Philippines ===
Law in the Philippines criminalizes adultery and what it terms concubinage, both of which are treated as sexual infidelity in the Family Code and deemed "crimes against chastity" under the Revised Penal Code (RPC). In this jurisdiction, the term concubinage forms part of dualistic statutory approach to adultery that discriminates against wives. Under the law, “adultery” can only be committed by a wife and an extramarital lover and requires only that the husband provide proof of the affair. It is defined under Article 333 of the RPC.

Concubinage as committed by a husband demands a higher burden of proof, requiring the wife to provide both evidence of an affair and of the husband's keeping a mistress in the conjugal dwelling, having sexual intercourse under "scandalous circumstances" or having lived together with his mistress in any other place. It is defined under Article 334 of the RPC.

The sentencing is also different and forms part of a broader pattern of sexually discriminatory legislation in the Philippines, where there is also no divorce law.

=== United States ===
The term was used in the US legal system, notably in Louisiana, with a similar meaning to that in the French legal system, well into the 20th century.

Little similarity remains between modern US laws on cohabitation and historical laws on concubinage, which, as constitutional prohibitions on discrimination between children have advanced has been labelled "reminiscent of a bygone era" and "no longer a distinct entity subject to clearly defined rules".

== See also ==
- Concubinage in Canada

== Notes ==
1. "[marriage] seems to have had a double object, first, to establish between husband and wife, perfect equality of rank, of condition and of dignity, honor, dignitas; it is this which distinguishes it precisely from concubinatus, called as well inaequale conjugium."
2. "Marriage implied the intention of the husband to have a legal wife, to raise her to his rank, to make her his equal, and the corresponding intent of the wife; this was called the affectio maritalis (‘marital affection’)."
