= Sharia in the Philippines =

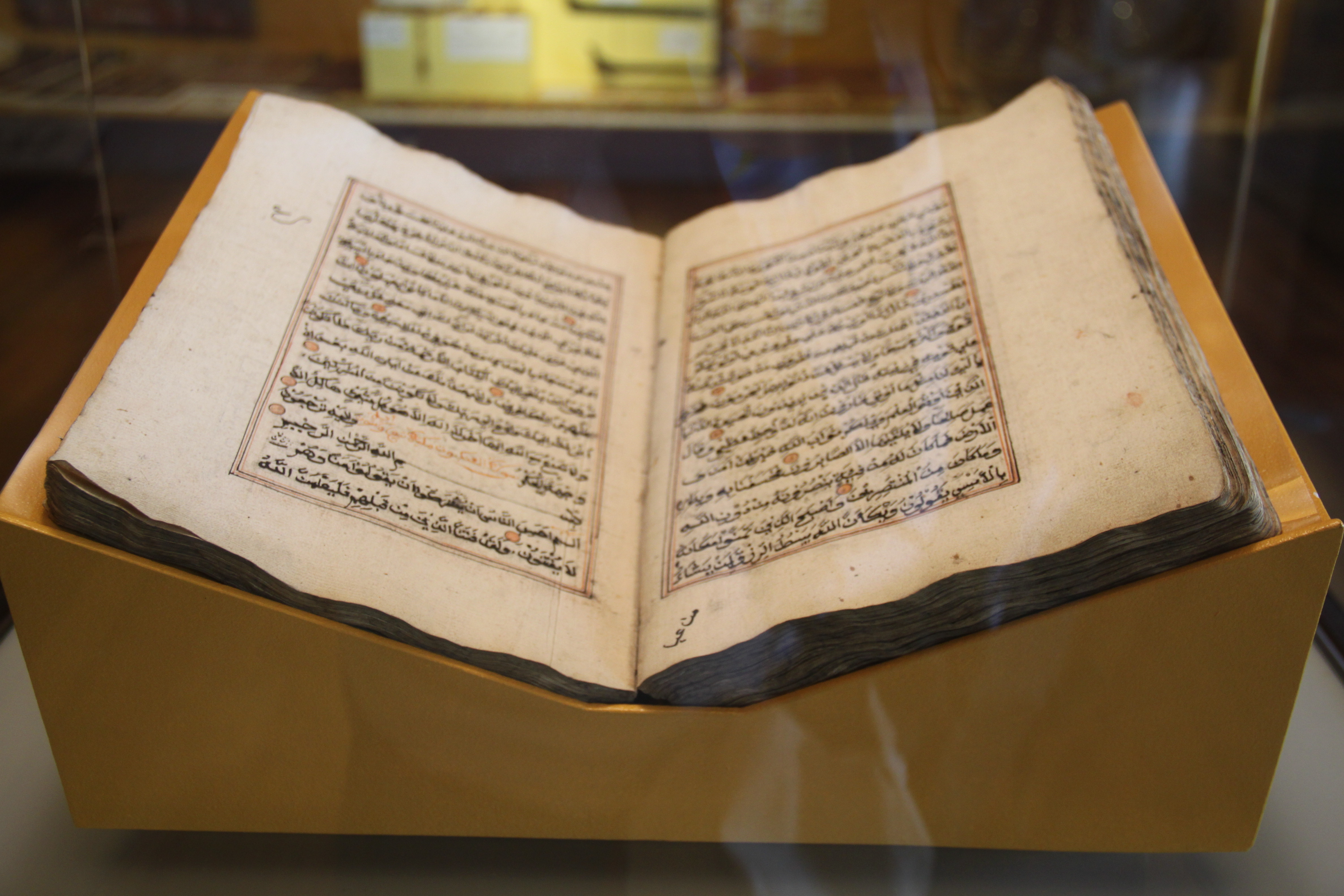
A Quran from the Bangsamoro region

Shari'ah, or Islamic law, is partially implemented in the legal system of the Philippines and applies exclusively to Filipino Muslims. Shari'ah courts operate under the supervision of the Supreme Court.

Until 2024, the jurisdiction of Shari'ah courts was limited to the Muslim-majority Bangsamoro and other parts of Mindanao. In August 2024, their jurisdiction was expanded nationwide through Republic Act No. 12018, which also established three additional courts.

== Background ==
The Shari'ah court system in the Philippines was established under Presidential Decree No. 1083, also known as the Code of Muslim Personal Laws, which was issued by President Ferdinand Marcos on February 7, 1977. The decree was issued upon the recommendation of the now-defunct Commission on National Integration.

Shari'ah courts operate under the administrative supervision of the Supreme Court of the Philippines. Their jurisdiction covers matters involving Muslim personal and customary law but does not extend to criminal matters.

Republic Act No. 6734, the Organic Law of the Autonomous Region in Muslim Mindanao, recognized two Shari'ah district courts and provided for the establishment of a Shari'ah appellate court. However, the appellate court was never established.

The Bangsamoro Organic Law, which established the Bangsamoro Autonomous Region in Muslim Mindanao, provides for the establishment of a Shari'ah High Court for the region.

Proposals to expand the jurisdiction of Shari'ah courts beyond Mindanao emerged amid the growing Muslim population in other parts of the country. In May 2023, Senator Robin Padilla filed Senate Bill No. 2215 during the 19th Congress of the Philippines, proposing the establishment of additional courts nationwide. The proposal was enacted in August 2024 through Republic Act No. 12018, which expanded the Shari'ah court system nationwide.

== Organization ==
=== Shari'ah district courts ===
As of 2024, there are eight Shari'ah district courts in the Philippines, the first six of which have territorial jurisdiction over areas in Mindanao. Shari'ah district courts are roughly equivalent to regional trial courts in the country's regular court system. The newly established Seventh and Eighth Shari'ah District Courts have territorial jurisdiction over the Visayas and Luzon, respectively, while the Sixth District Court has jurisdiction over parts of Mindanao outside the territorial jurisdiction of the first five district courts.

Shari'ah district court	No. of circuit courts	Location	Jurisdiction
First Shari'ah District Court	6	Jolo, Sulu	Sulu
Second Shari'ah District Court	8	Bongao, Tawi-Tawi	Tawi-Tawi
Third Shari'ah District Court	10	Zamboanga City	Basilan, Zamboanga del Norte, Zamboanga del Sur, (Note: As stated in the Code of Muslim Personal Laws. It is unclear whether Zamboanga Sibugay, which was created from Zamboanga del Sur in 2001, is included in the territorial jurisdiction of the district court.) Dipolog, Pagadian, Zamboanga City
Fourth Shari'ah District Court	12	Marawi	Lanao del Norte, Lanao del Sur, Iligan, Marawi
Fifth Shari'ah District Court	15	Cotabato City	Maguindanao, (Note: Now Maguindanao del Norte and Maguindanao del Sur, following their division in 2022. However, Republic Act No. 12018, enacted in 2024, still lists the two provinces collectively as "Maguindanao".) Cotabato, Sultan Kudarat, Cotabato City, Kidapawan
Sixth Shari'ah District Court	5	Davao City	Bukidnon, Camiguin, Misamis Occidental, Misamis Oriental, Davao de Oro, Davao del Norte, Davao del Sur, Davao Oriental, Davao Occidental, Sarangani, South Cotabato, Agusan del Norte, Agusan del Sur, Dinagat Islands, Surigao del Norte, Surigao del Sur, Cagayan de Oro
Seventh Shari'ah District Court	3	Cebu City	Aklan, Antique, Capiz, Guimaras, Iloilo, Negros Occidental, Bohol, Cebu, Negros Oriental, Siquijor, Biliran, Eastern Samar, Leyte, Northern Samar, Samar, Southern Leyte, Tacloban (Visayas)
Eighth Shari'ah District Court	4	Manila	National Capital Region, Baguio, Abra, Apayao, Benguet, Ifugao, Kalinga, Mountain Province, Ilocos Norte, Ilocos Sur, La Union, Pangasinan, Batanes, Cagayan, Isabela, Nueva Vizcaya, Quirino, Aurora, Bataan, Bulacan, Nueva Ecija, Pampanga, Tarlac, Zambales, Batangas, Cavite, Laguna, Rizal, Quezon, Marinduque, Occidental Mindoro, Oriental Mindoro, Palawan, Romblon, Albay, Camarines Norte, Camarines Sur, Catanduanes, Masbate, Sorsogon (Luzon)
Philippines (8 district courts)	63		

=== Shari'ah circuit courts ===
There are 63 Shari'ah circuit courts in the Philippines. Their jurisdiction is comparable to that of city and municipal courts in the regular court system.

=== Bangsamoro Shari'ah High Court ===
The Bangsamoro Organic Law, which took effect on August 10, 2018, provides for the establishment of a Shari'ah high court for the Bangsamoro region. The court will have exclusive appellate jurisdiction over Shari'ah district courts within the autonomous region. On January 21, 2026, the Supreme Court began preparations for the establishment of the high court.

== Application ==
=== Personal status laws ===
==== Marriage ====
The Code of Muslim Personal Laws governs marriages solemnized under Islamic rites and recognizes divorce, unlike the Family Code of the Philippines, which does not provide for divorce for most non-Muslim Filipinos. Divorce is also recognized in marriages between Muslims and non-Muslims. In one such case, the Supreme Court upheld in 2016 the divorce of a Christian woman and a Muslim man who had married under Islamic rites.

Under the Code of Muslim Personal Laws, a husband may seek a "perpetual divorce" from his wife or invoke li'an to dissolve the marriage in cases involving adultery. A wife may seek the dissolution of her marriage through faskh if certain conditions are met, including if her husband commits "unusual cruelty", suffers from insanity or an incurable disease, or fails to provide family support for six consecutive months. A husband may effect a talaq divorce through a single repudiation of his wife after totally abstaining from sexual relations with her.

=== Financial laws ===
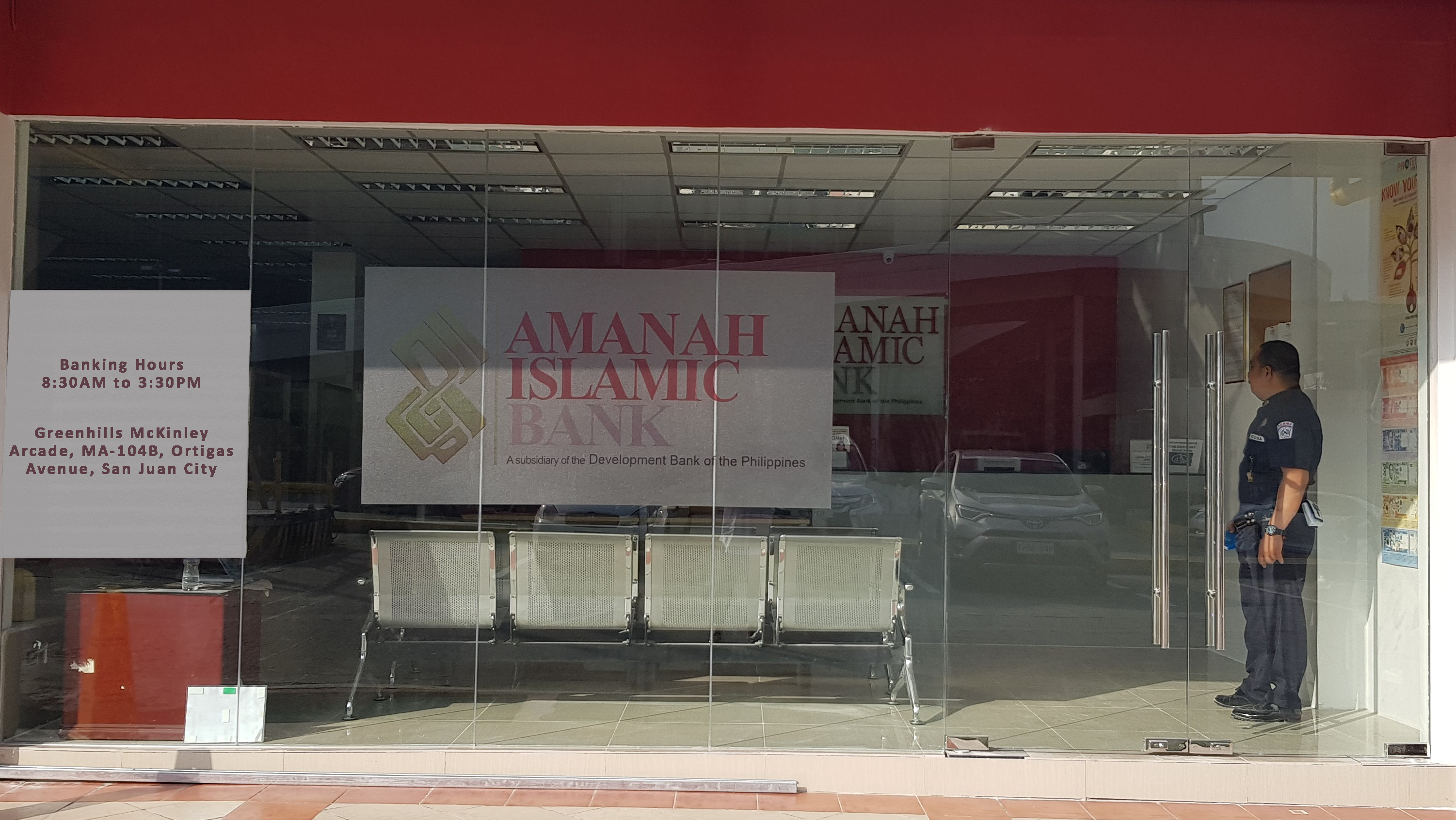
Al-Amanah Islamic Bank outlet in San Juan, Metro Manila

Until 2019, the Philippines had no framework legislation providing for the establishment of Islamic banks or banks compliant with Shari'ah. On August 22, 2019, Republic Act No. 11439, also known as the "An Act Providing for the Regulation and Organization of Islamic Banks", was signed into law. The law took effect on September 15, 2019, and the Bangko Sentral ng Pilipinas, the country's central bank, issued its initial regulations for Islamic banks on December 31, 2019.

Before 2019, the only Islamic bank operating in the Philippines was Al-Amanah Islamic Bank, which was founded in 1973. Legislation enacted in 2019 allowed foreign and domestic firms to establish full-fledged Islamic banks in the Philippines, as well as Islamic banking units or subsidiaries under conventional banks.

== Shari'ah legal practice ==
To become a lawyer under the Shari'ah court system of the Philippines, one must pass the Shari'ah Bar Exam which consists of the following subject matter: Code Muslim Personal Laws; Special Rules of Procedures; Jurisprudence (Fiqh), and the Muslim Law on Inheritance and Succession. A Shari'ah lawyer according to Bar Matter No. 681, a Supreme Court decision made en banc on August 5, 1993, is a "special member" of the Integrated Bar of the Philippines and not a fully pledged member. Members of the Shari'ah Bar are eligible to become circuit court judges but only those who are members of both the Shari'ah Bar and Regular Bar could be district court judges.

== See also ==
- Application of Sharia by country
