= Concubinage in Canada =

Largely unrecognised by modern courts, concubinage – the formal position of a mistress maintaining a religiously-sanctioned partnership with a man to whom she is not wed – has a varied history when it has appeared in Canada.

The term "concubine" has many definitions, referring to any illicit lasting relationship with an unmarried woman, or an "unmarried wife", or an extra-marital partner to a married man. Much of the political debate has tried to first define the term being used, followed by the legal arguments setting out its place in society.

== History ==
In New France, the institution of common-law or informal unions between French men and aboriginal women (known as marriages according to the ways of the land) had an ambiguous legal status. The practice was generally regarded by colonial authorities and the Church as a form of concubinage.

== Individual cases ==
Often the issue of concubinage has appeared in insurance law, when the mistress of an apparent extramarital affair has laid claim, typically as a commonlaw spouse, to the estate of a man who has a legally-wedded wife, or no wife at all.

== Monogamous concubinage ==
They were not trammelled by the queer pride which makes a man of English stock unwilling to make a red-skinned woman his wife, though anxious enough to make her his concubine.

— Adam Shortt, Sir Arthur George Doughty

Concubines in Canada were traditionally native women who were not believed suitable to become full wives to the European settlers. Elizabeth "Molly" Brant, the sister of the famed native chief Joseph Brant is believed to have served as the concubine to Sir William Johnson; although his sexual promiscuity was widely known.

At such a place, surrounded by such influences and such unfavorable circumstances, if Mr. Connolly...desired...to take this Indian maiden to his home, he had one of three courses to pursue; that was, to marry her according to the customs and usages of the Cree Indians - to travel with her between three and four thousand miles, in canoes and on foot, to have his marriage solemnized by a priest or magistrate - or to make her his concubine. I think the evidence...will clearly show which of these three courses he did adopt, and which of them...he honorably and religiously followed.

— Connolly vs. Woolrich and Johnson et al, 1867

In July 1867, controversy broke out over the case of Connolly v. Woolrych, wherein a Canadian working for the North West Company had taken a 15-year-old native wife and lived with her for 28 years, before leaving her to partake in a traditional Christian marriage ceremony with his cousin, Miss Woolrich, with whom he lived another 17 years. After the death of Connolly and his "concubine" Suzanne, one of her many children sued for the right to his estate claiming that the second marriage was invalid and seeking to "vindicate his mother's name from the stain of concubinage", while his proper wife argued that he had never been married to Suzanne.

The court noted that Suzanne and Connolly had omitted the traditional words "legitimate marriage" from the baptism of their children by Fr. Turcotte, instead asking him just to refer to their parenthood, but not to any marriage. The court ultimately found that the territory in which he lived with Suzanne had been under native self-rule and therefore not bound to English law and proper registration of marriage would not have been necessary to establish a marriage, but that the native tribes had no marriage ceremonies, and the couple appeared to have "lived exactly as Christian man and wife, and not as a Christian living with a barbarian concubine", making pointed reference to the fact that Suzanne had entered a convent after Connolly's "act of selfish cruelty" in abandoning their relationship, and was subsequently sent regular stipends for support by Connolly and his wife.

Under the Revised Statutes of British Columbia, it was legal under the Administration Act, Cap. 5 for a resident of British Columbia to "support his concubine".

Since the Canadian military forbade enlisted members from marrying during their service in World War I, individual cases like that of Sgt. W. H. Sharpe roused public sentiment. Sharpe had listed Alma Freed as his wife when he enlisted, yet a year later in 1916 held a marriage ceremony with her after she gave birth to a son. He successfully argued, with the aid of PC 2615, that he had only been regularizing the status of his "unmarried wife". In 1919, Member of Parliament Rodolphe Lemieux tried to remove the portion of the Pension Bill that allowed the pension board "to grant a pension to a woman living with a man as his wife, but not married to him".

== Concubine in addition to wife ==
In the lead-up to the codification of the 1866 Civil Code of Lower Canada, Member of Parliament O'Farrell noted the inconsistency that would allow a man to leave his estate to a "common concubine" to the exclusion of his wife, but not to a charitable organisation in the same circumstance. The draft which was finally approved was "torturous and detailed, emphasizing the sharp contradiction between freedom and morals", and allowed bequests only to provide such as was necessary to "maintain" a concubine and any "incestuous or adulterine children". The Code also made it clear that no fault divorces were not permissible, and allowed separation only if the husband demanded it based on his wife's adultery, or that "a wife may demand the separation on the ground of the husband's adultery, if he keep his concubine in their common habitation".
