= Regional trial court =

Highest trial courts in the Philippines

Regional trial courts
- Panrehiyong hukuman sa paglilitis
- Composition method: Presidential appointment from the short-list submitted by the Judicial and Bar Council
- Appeals to: the Court of Appeals and the Sandiganbayan
- Appeals from: Metropolitan trial courts; Municipal trial courts in cities; Municipal trial courts; Municipal circuit trial courts

Division map
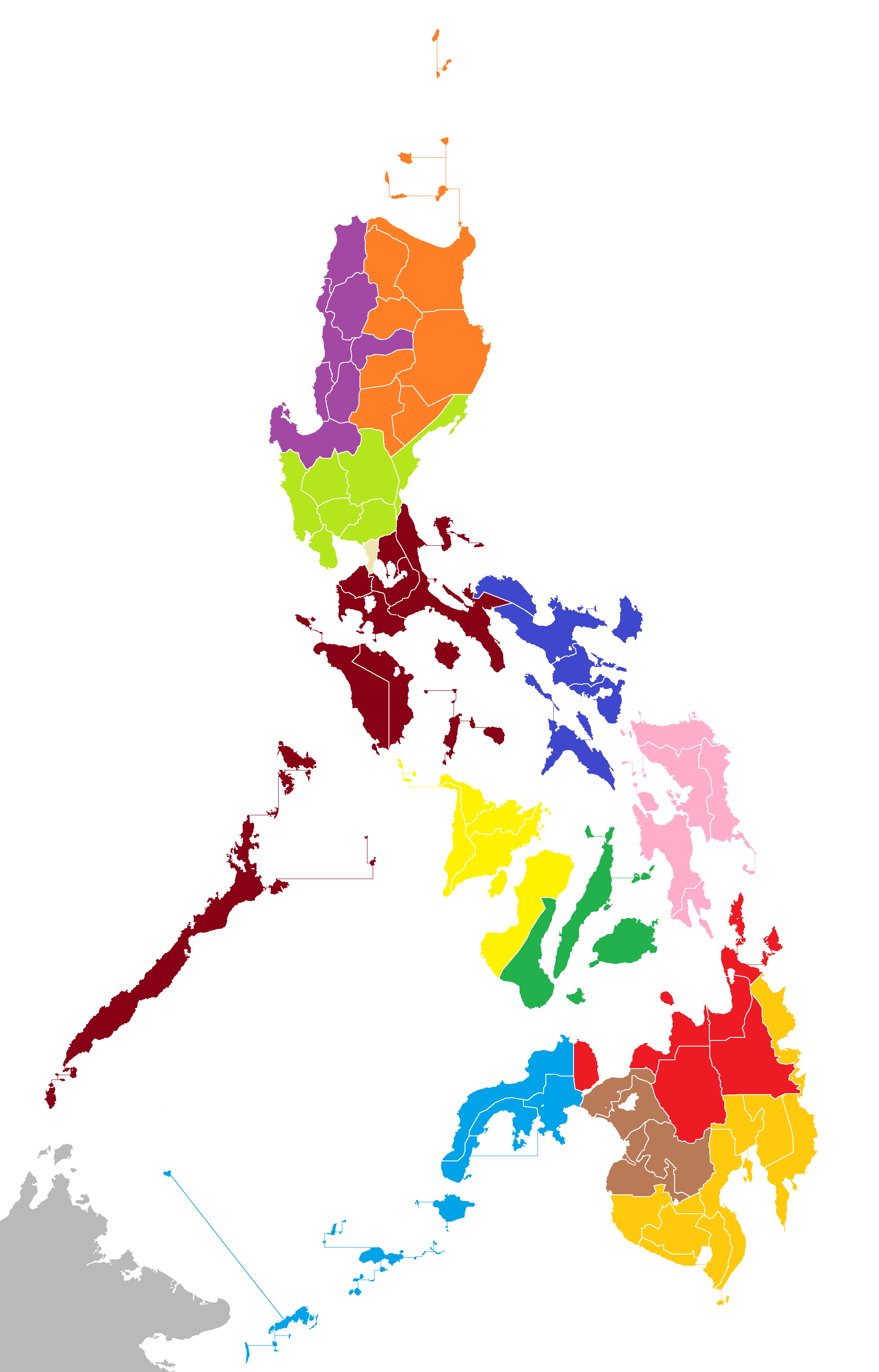

In the Philippines, a regional trial court (RTC; Filipino: panrehiyong hukuman sa paglilitis) is a higher-level trial court that exercises original jurisdiction over major criminal and civil cases, as well as appellate jurisdiction over certain cases decided by lower courts.

== History ==
The regional trial court traces its origins to the courts of first instance (Filipino: hukumang unang dulugan; Spanish: tribunal de primera instancia), which existed during the Spanish colonial period. The courts continued to operate under both Spanish and American colonial rule. Following Philippine independence from the United States, Republic Act No. 296, or the Judiciary Act of 1948, was enacted to strengthen the jurisdiction of the courts of first instance. Under the law, these courts had jurisdiction over civil and criminal cases, as well as appeals from decisions of municipal and city justice of the peace courts.

There was a backlog of civil and criminal cases, with some proceedings delayed for years. In addition, specialized courts were established to handle particular cases, including criminal, agrarian, and family matters, in an effort to reduce the backlog. However, their establishment further complicated the judicial system. In response, the Interim Batasang Pambansa passed Batas Pambansa Blg. 129, (Note: lit. 'National Law No. 129') or the Judiciary Reorganization Act of 1980, which reorganized the country's lower and intermediate courts and renamed the courts of first instance as regional trial courts.

== Jurisdiction ==
Batas Pambansa Blg. 129, or the Judiciary Reorganization Act of 1980, as amended by Republic Act No. 7691 and Republic Act No. 11576, provides that regional trial courts exercise the following jurisdiction:

=== Civil ===
Regional trial courts exercise exclusive original jurisdiction:

1. In all civil actions in which the subject of the litigation is incapable of pecuniary estimation;
2. In all civil actions involving the title to or possession of real property, or any interest therein, where the assessed value exceeds ₱400,000, except for forcible entry and unlawful detainer of lands or buildings, over which the metropolitan trial courts, municipal trial courts in cities, municipal trial courts, and municipal circuit trial courts have original jurisdiction;
3. In all actions in admiralty and maritime jurisdiction where the demand or claim exceeds ₱2,000,000;
4. In all probate matters, whether testate or intestate, where the gross value of the estate exceeds ₱2,000,000;
5. In all actions involving the contract of marriage and marital relations;
6. In all cases not within the exclusive jurisdiction of any court, tribunal, person, or body exercising judicial or quasi-judicial functions;
7. In all civil actions and special proceedings falling within the exclusive original jurisdiction of a Juvenile and Domestic Relations Court and of the Court of Agrarian Relations, as provided by law; and
8. In all other cases in which the demand, exclusive of interest, damages of whatever kind, attorney's fees, litigation expenses and costs, or the value of the property in controversy exceeds ₱2,000,000.

=== Criminal ===
Regional trial courts exercise exclusive original jurisdiction over all criminal cases not within the exclusive jurisdiction of any other court, tribunal, or body, except those falling under the exclusive and concurrent jurisdiction of the Sandiganbayan, which has exclusive jurisdiction over such cases.

Regional trial courts typically hear serious criminal cases, such as murder and robbery, while less serious offenses generally fall within the jurisdiction of first-level courts.

=== Original and special jurisdiction ===
Regional trial courts exercise original jurisdiction:

1. In issuing writs of certiorari, prohibition, mandamus, quo warranto, habeas corpus, and injunction, which may be enforced in any part of their respective regions; and
2. In actions affecting ambassadors and other public ministers and consuls.

The Supreme Court may designate certain branches of regional trial courts to handle exclusively criminal cases, juvenile and domestic relations cases, agrarian cases, urban land reform cases that do not fall under the jurisdiction of quasi-judicial bodies and agencies, and other special cases as it may determine in the interest of the speedy and efficient administration of justice.

=== Appeals from lower courts ===
Regional trial courts exercise appellate jurisdiction over all cases decided by the metropolitan trial courts, municipal trial courts, and municipal circuit trial courts within their respective territorial jurisdictions. These cases are decided on the basis of the entire record of the proceedings in the court of origin and any memoranda or briefs submitted by the parties or required by the regional trial courts. Decisions of regional trial courts in these cases may be appealed to the Court of Appeals by petition for review. The Court of Appeals may give the petition due course only if it shows prima facie that the lower court committed an error of fact or law warranting the reversal or modification of the decision or judgment under review.

== List ==
Pursuant to Batas Pambansa Blg. 129, otherwise known as the Judiciary Reorganization Act of 1980, regional trial court branches are distributed among the country's judicial regions, provinces, and cities. Congress may create additional RTC branches by law when necessary.

The following is a list of regional trial court branches, organized by judicial region, province, and city or municipality, together with their corresponding branch numbers and the total number of branches in each region.

| Judicial region | No. of branches | Province | City/Municipality | Branches (Note: FC means family court) |
|---|---|---|---|---|
| National Capital | 336 | Caloocan | | 120, 121, 122, 123, 124, 125, 126, 127, 128, 129, 130, 131, 232, 1-FC |
| National Capital | 336 | Las Piñas | | 197, 198, 199, 200, 201, 202, 253, 254, 255, 275, 2-FC |
| National Capital | 336 | Makati | | 56, 57, 58, 59, 60, 61, 62, 63, 64, 65, 66, 132, 133, 134, 135, 136, 137, 138, 139, 140, 141, 142, 143, 144, 145, 146, 147, 148, 149, 150, 233, 234, 235, 236, 237, 238, 239, 240, 241, 242, 243, 244, 245, 246, 247, 248, 249, 250, 251, 252, 3-FC |
| National Capital | 336 | Malabon | | 72, 73, 74, 169, 170, 289, 290, 291, 292, 293, 4-FC |
| National Capital | 336 | Mandaluyong | | 208, 209, 210, 211, 212, 213, 214, 277, 278, 279, 280, 281, 5-FC |
| National Capital | 336 | Manila | | 1, 2, 3, 4, 5, 6, 7, 8, 9, 10, 11, 12, 13, 14, 15, 16, 17, 18, 19, 20, 21, 22, 23, 24, 25, 26, 27, 28, 29, 30, 31, 32, 33, 34, 35, 36, 37, 38, 39, 40, 41, 42, 43, 44, 45, 46, 47, 48, 49, 50, 51, 52, 53, 54, 55, 173, 174, 175, 176, 177, 178, 179, 180, 181, 182, 183, 184, 185, 186, 187, 188, 189, 190, 191, 6-FC |
| National Capital | 336 | Marikina | | 156, 165, 168, 263, 192, 193, 272, 273, 7-FC |
| National Capital | 336 | Muntinlupa | | 203, 204, 205, 206, 207, 256, 276, 8-FC |
| National Capital | 336 | Navotas | | 286, 287, 288, 9-FC |
| National Capital | 336 | Parañaque | | 194, 195, 196, 257, 258, 259, 260, 274, 294, 295, 296, 10-FC |
| National Capital | 336 | Pasay | | 108, 109, 110, 111, 112, 113, 114, 115, 116, 117, 118, 119, 231, 297, 298, 299, 300, 301, 11-FC |
| National Capital | 336 | Pasig | | 67, 71, 151, 152, 154, 155, 157, 158, 159, 161, 164, 166, 167, 261, 262, 265, 268, 12-FC |
| National Capital | 336 | Quezon City | | 76, 77, 78, 79, 80, 81, 82, 83, 84, 85, 86, 87, 88, 89, 90, 91, 92, 93, 94, 95, 96, 97, 98, 99, 100, 101, 102, 103, 104, 105, 106, 107, 215, 216, 217, 218, 219, 220, 221, 222, 223, 224, 225, 226, 227, 228, 229, 230, 302, 303, 304, 305, 306, 307, 308, 309, 310, 311, 312, 313, 314, 315, 316, 317, 318, 319, 320, 13-FC |
| National Capital | 336 | San Juan | | 68, 160, 162, 264, 14-FC |
| National Capital | 336 | Taguig | | 69, 70, 153, 163, 266, 267, 271, 15-FC |
| National Capital | 336 | Valenzuela | | 75, 171, 172, 269, 270, 282, 283, 284, 285, 16-FC |
| First | 97 | Abra | Bangued | 1, 2, 1-FC |
| First | 97 | Abra | Bucay | 58 |
| First | 97 | Baguio | | 3, 4, 5, 6, 7, 59, 60, 61, 78, 79, 2-FC |
| First | 97 | Benguet | Buguias | 64 |
| First | 97 | Benguet | La Trinidad | 8, 9, 10, 62, 63, 3-FC |
| First | 97 | Dagupan | | 40, 41, 42, 43, 44, 76, 15-FC |
| First | 97 | Ilocos Norte | Bangui | 19 |
| First | 97 | Ilocos Norte | Batac | 17, 18, 6-FC |
| First | 97 | Ilocos Norte | Dingras | 5-FC |
| First | 97 | Ilocos Norte | Laoag | 11, 12, 13, 14, 15, 16, 65, 4-FC |
| First | 97 | Ilocos Sur | Cabugao | 24 |
| First | 97 | Ilocos Sur | Candon | 23, 71, 8-FC |
| First | 97 | Ilocos Sur | Narvacan | 22, 72, 9-FC |
| First | 97 | Ilocos Sur | Tagudin | 25 |
| First | 97 | Ilocos Sur | Vigan | 20, 21, 74, 7-FC |
| First | 97 | La Union | Agoo | 31, 32 |
| First | 97 | La Union | Balaoan | 34 |
| First | 97 | La Union | Bauang | 33, 67, 11-FC |
| First | 97 | La Union | San Fernando | 26, 27, 28, 29, 30, 66, 10-FC |
| First | 97 | Mountain Province | Bontoc | 35, 36, 12-FC |
| First | 97 | Mountain Province | Paracelis | 80 |
| First | 97 | Pangasinan | Alaminos | 54, 55, 75, 17-FC |
| First | 97 | Pangasinan | Asingan | 81 |
| First | 97 | Pangasinan | Burgos | 70 |
| First | 97 | Pangasinan | Lingayen | 37, 39, 68, 69, 14-FC |
| First | 97 | Pangasinan | Rosales | 53 |
| First | 97 | Pangasinan | San Carlos | 56, 57, 77, 13-FC |
| First | 97 | Pangasinan | Tayug | 51, 52 |
| First | 97 | Pangasinan | Urdaneta | 45, 46, 47, 48, 49, 73, 16-FC |
| First | 97 | Pangasinan | Villasis | 50 |
| Second | 49 | Apayao | Luna | 26 |
| Second | 49 | Batanes | Basco | 13 |
| Second | 49 | Cagayan | Aparri | 6, 7, 8, 9 |
| Second | 49 | Cagayan | Ballesteros | 33 |
| Second | 49 | Cagayan | Sanchez Mira | 12 |
| Second | 49 | Cagayan | Solana | 2-FC |
| Second | 49 | Cagayan | Tuao | 11 |
| Second | 49 | Cagayan | Tuguegarao | 1, 2, 3, 4, 5, 10, 1-FC |
| Second | 49 | Ifugao | Alfonso Lista | 15 |
| Second | 49 | Ifugao | Banaue | 34 |
| Second | 49 | Ifugao | Lagawe | 14, 6-FC |
| Second | 49 | Isabela | Cabagan | 22 |
| Second | 49 | Isabela | Cauayan | 19, 20, 40, 5-FC |
| Second | 49 | Isabela | Echague | 24 |
| Second | 49 | Isabela | Ilagan | 16, 17, 18, 3-FC |
| Second | 49 | Isabela | Roxas | 23 |
| Second | 49 | Kalinga | Lubuagan | 39 |
| Second | 49 | Kalinga | Tabuk | 25, 7-FC |
| Second | 49 | Nueva Vizcaya | Bambang | 30, 37 |
| Second | 49 | Nueva Vizcaya | Bayombong | 27, 28, 29, 8-FC |
| Second | 49 | Quirino | Cabarroguis | 31, 32, 9-FC |
| Second | 49 | Quirino | Maddela | 38 |
| Second | 49 | Santiago | | 21, 35, 36, 4-FC |
| Third | 139 | Angeles City | | 56, 57, 58, 59, 60, 61, 62, 114, 115, 116, 117, 118, 119, 10-FC |
| Third | 139 | Aurora | Baler | 90, 91, 1-FC |
| Third | 139 | Aurora | Casiguran | 101 |
| Third | 139 | Bataan | Balanga | 1, 2, 3, 92, 93, 2-FC |
| Third | 139 | Bataan | Dinalupihan | 5, 96 |
| Third | 139 | Bataan | Mariveles | 4, 94, 95, 3-FC |
| Third | 139 | Bulacan | Malolos | 6, 7, 8, 9, 10, 11, 12, 13, 14, 15, 16, 17, 18, 19, 20, 21, 22, 76, 77, 78, 79, 80, 81, 82, 83, 84, 85, 102, 103, 104, 4-FC |
| Third | 139 | Bulacan | Meycauayan | 121 |
| Third | 139 | Bulacan | San Jose del Monte | 120, 5-FC |
| Third | 139 | Bulacan | Santa Maria | 6-FC |
| Third | 139 | Nueva Ecija | Cabanatuan | 23, 24, 25, 26, 27, 28, 29, 30, 86, 8-FC |
| Third | 139 | Nueva Ecija | Guimba | 31, 32, 33 |
| Third | 139 | Nueva Ecija | Gapan | 34, 35, 36, 87 |
| Third | 139 | Nueva Ecija | Muñoz | 123 (Note: Not yet organized.) |
| Third | 139 | Nueva Ecija | Palayan | 40, 7-FC |
| Third | 139 | Nueva Ecija | San Jose | 38, 39, 122 |
| Third | 139 | Nueva Ecija | Santo Domingo | 37, 88, 89 |
| Third | 139 | Olongapo | | 72, 73, 74, 75, 97, 98, 99, 100, 12-FC |
| Third | 139 | Pampanga | Guagua | 49, 50, 51, 52, 53 |
| Third | 139 | Pampanga | Macabebe | 54, 55, 124, 125, 126 |
| Third | 139 | Pampanga | San Fernando | 41, 42, 43, 44, 45, 46, 47, 48, 9-FC |
| Third | 139 | Tarlac | Camiling | 68, 112 |
| Third | 139 | Tarlac | Capas | 66, 109 |
| Third | 139 | Tarlac | Concepcion | 113 |
| Third | 139 | Tarlac | Paniqui | 67, 105, 106, 107, 108 |
| Third | 139 | Tarlac | Tarlac City | 63, 64, 65, 110, 111, 11-FC |
| Third | 139 | Zambales | Iba | 69, 70, 71, 13-FC |
| Fourth | 204 | Batangas | Agoncillo | 179 |
| Fourth | 204 | Batangas | Balayan | 9, 10, 11 |
| Fourth | 204 | Batangas | Batangas City | 1, 2, 3, 4, 7, 8, 84, 1-FC |
| Fourth | 204 | Batangas | Lemery | 5 |
| Fourth | 204 | Batangas | Lipa | 12, 13, 85, 2-FC |
| Fourth | 204 | Batangas | Nasugbu | 14 |
| Fourth | 204 | Batangas | Rosario | 87 |
| Fourth | 204 | Batangas | Santo Tomas | 178 |
| Fourth | 204 | Batangas | Taal | 86 |
| Fourth | 204 | Batangas | Tanauan | 6, 66, 83 |
| Fourth | 204 | Cavite | Bacoor | 19, 89, 110, 111, 112, 113, 114, 115, 116, 117, 118, 119 |
| Fourth | 204 | Cavite | Carmona | 109 |
| Fourth | 204 | Cavite | Cavite City | 16, 17, 88 |
| Fourth | 204 | Cavite | Dasmariñas | 90, 128, 129 |
| Fourth | 204 | Cavite | Imus | 20, 21, 22, 120, 121, 122, 123, 124, 125, 126, 127, 4-FC |
| Fourth | 204 | Cavite | Naic | 15, 132 |
| Fourth | 204 | Cavite | Tagaytay | 18, 133, 134, 135, 136, 3-FC |
| Fourth | 204 | Cavite | Trece Martires | 23, 130, 131 |
| Fourth | 204 | Laguna | Biñan | 24, 25, 152, 153, 154, 155, 156, 157 |
| Fourth | 204 | Laguna | Cabuyao | 108 |
| Fourth | 204 | Laguna | Calamba | 34, 35, 36, 37, 92, 103, 104, 105, 8-FC |
| Fourth | 204 | Laguna | Los Baños | 107 |
| Fourth | 204 | Laguna | San Pablo | 29, 30, 32, 181, 182, 183, 184, 7-FC |
| Fourth | 204 | Laguna | San Pedro | 31, 93, 169, 170, 171 |
| Fourth | 204 | Laguna | Santa Cruz | 26, 27, 28, 91, 176, 6-FC |
| Fourth | 204 | Laguna | Santa Rosa | 101, 102, 185, 186 |
| Fourth | 204 | Laguna | Siniloan | 33, 166 |
| Fourth | 204 | Lucena | | 53, 54, 55, 56, 57, 58, 59, 60, 167, 168, 15-FC |
| Fourth | 204 | Marinduque | Boac | 38, 94, 9-FC |
| Fourth | 204 | Occidental Mindoro | Mamburao | 44, 10-FC |
| Fourth | 204 | Occidental Mindoro | San Jose | 45, 46 |
| Fourth | 204 | Oriental Mindoro | Bongabong | 180 |
| Fourth | 204 | Oriental Mindoro | Calapan | 39, 40, 177, 11-FC |
| Fourth | 204 | Oriental Mindoro | Naujan | 12-FC |
| Fourth | 204 | Oriental Mindoro | Pinamalayan | 41, 42 |
| Fourth | 204 | Oriental Mindoro | Roxas | 43 |
| Fourth | 204 | Palawan | Brooke's Point | 165 |
| Fourth | 204 | Palawan | Coron | 163 |
| Fourth | 204 | Palawan | Roxas | 95, 164 |
| Fourth | 204 | Palawan | Taytay | 14-FC |
| Fourth | 204 | Puerto Princesa | | 47, 48, 49, 50, 51, 52, 13-FC |
| Fourth | 204 | Quezon | Calauag | 63 |
| Fourth | 204 | Quezon | Catanauan | 96 |
| Fourth | 204 | Quezon | Gumaca | 61, 62, 172, 173 |
| Fourth | 204 | Quezon | Infanta | 65 |
| Fourth | 204 | Quezon | Mauban | 64 |
| Fourth | 204 | Quezon | Sariaya | 16-FC |
| Fourth | 204 | Rizal | Antipolo | 71, 72, 73, 74, 97, 98, 99, 100, 137, 138, 139, 140, 144, 145, 146, 147, 148, 149, 150, 151, 17-FC |
| Fourth | 204 | Rizal | Cainta | 141 (Note: Temporarily holds office and court sessions in Antipolo.), 142, 143, 18-FC |
| Fourth | 204 | Rizal | Binangonan | 67, 68, 69, 70 |
| Fourth | 204 | Rizal | Morong | 78, 79, 80, 158, 159, 160, 161, 162 |
| Fourth | 204 | Rizal | San Mateo | 75, 76, 77, 174, 175 |
| Fourth | 204 | Romblon | Cajidiocan | 106 |
| Fourth | 204 | Romblon | Odiongan | 82 |
| Fourth | 204 | Romblon | Romblon | 81, 19-FC |
| Fifth | 79 | Albay | Daraga | 2-FC |
| Fifth | 79 | Albay | Legazpi | 1, 2, 3, 4, 5, 6, 7, 8, 9, 10, 1-FC |
| Fifth | 79 | Albay | Ligao | 11, 12, 13, 14, 4-FC |
| Fifth | 79 | Albay | Tabaco | 15, 16, 17, 18, 3-FC |
| Fifth | 79 | Camarines Norte | Daet | 38, 39, 40, 41, 5-FC |
| Fifth | 79 | Camarines Norte | Labo | 64 |
| Fifth | 79 | Camarines Sur | Calabanga | 63 |
| Fifth | 79 | Camarines Sur | Iriga | 34, 35, 36, 37, 59, 60, 7-FC |
| Fifth | 79 | Camarines Sur | Libmanan | 29, 56, 57 |
| Fifth | 79 | Camarines Sur | Pili | 31, 32, 33, 8-FC |
| Fifth | 79 | Camarines Sur | San Jose | 30, 58 |
| Fifth | 79 | Catanduanes | Virac | 42, 43, 9-FC |
| Fifth | 79 | Masbate | Aroroy | 11-FC |
| Fifth | 79 | Masbate | Cataingan | 49 |
| Fifth | 79 | Masbate | Masbate City | 44, 45, 46, 47, 48, 10-FC |
| Fifth | 79 | Masbate | San Jacinto | 50 |
| Fifth | 79 | Naga | | 19, 20, 21, 22, 23, 24, 25, 26, 27, 28, 61, 62, 6-FC |
| Fifth | 79 | Sorsogon | Bulan | 65, 13-FC |
| Fifth | 79 | Sorsogon | Gubat | 54 |
| Fifth | 79 | Sorsogon | Irosin | 55 |
| Fifth | 79 | Sorsogon | Sorsogon City | 51, 52, 53, 66, 12-FC |
| Sixth | 94 | Aklan | Kalibo | 1, 2, 3, 4, 5, 6, 7, 8, 9, 1-FC |
| Sixth | 94 | Antique | Bugasong | 64 |
| Sixth | 94 | Antique | Culasi | 13 |
| Sixth | 94 | Antique | San Jose de Buenavista | 10, 11, 12, 2-FC |
| Sixth | 94 | Bacolod | | 41, 42, 43, 44, 45, 46, 47, 48, 49, 50, 51, 52, 53, 54, 78, 79, 60, 7-FC |
| Sixth | 94 | Capiz | Mambusao | 20, 21 |
| Sixth | 94 | Capiz | Roxas City | 14, 15, 16, 17, 18, 19, 3-FC |
| Sixth | 94 | Guimaras | Jordan | 65, 4-FC |
| Sixth | 94 | Iloilo | Barotac Viejo | 66, 70, 71 |
| Sixth | 94 | Iloilo | Dumangas | 68, 6-FC |
| Sixth | 94 | Iloilo | Guimbal | 67, 72 |
| Sixth | 94 | Iloilo | Janiuay | 76 |
| Sixth | 94 | Iloilo City | | 22, 23, 24, 25, 26, 27, 28, 29, 30, 31, 32, 33, 34, 35, 36, 37, 38, 39, 5-FC |
| Sixth | 94 | Negros Occidental | Bago | 62, 75, 9-FC |
| Sixth | 94 | Negros Occidental | Cadiz | 60, 10-FC |
| Sixth | 94 | Negros Occidental | Himamaylan | 55, 56, 13-FC |
| Sixth | 94 | Negros Occidental | Kabankalan | 61, 8-FC |
| Sixth | 94 | Negros Occidental | La Carlota | 63, 74, 14-FC |
| Sixth | 94 | Negros Occidental | Sagay | 73 |
| Sixth | 94 | Negros Occidental | San Carlos | 57, 58, 59, 11-FC |
| Sixth | 94 | Negros Occidental | Silay | 40, 69, 12-FC |
| Sixth | 94 | Negros Occidental | Sipalay | 77 |
| Seventh | 121 | Bohol | Carmen | 51 |
| Seventh | 121 | Bohol | Loay | 50 |
| Seventh | 121 | Bohol | Tagbilaran | 1, 2, 3, 4, 47, 48, 49, 1-FC |
| Seventh | 121 | Bohol | Talibon | 52, 101 |
| Seventh | 121 | Bohol | Ubay | 2-FC |
| Seventh | 121 | Cebu | Argao | 26, 93, 94 |
| Seventh | 121 | Cebu | Barili | 60, 95, 96, 97, 98 |
| Seventh | 121 | Cebu | Bogo | 61, 78, 79, 80, 81, 82, 10-FC |
| Seventh | 121 | Cebu | Carcar | 77, 11-FC |
| Seventh | 121 | Cebu | Danao | 25, 90, 91, 92, 9-FC |
| Seventh | 121 | Cebu | Minglanilla | 4-FC |
| Seventh | 121 | Cebu | Naga | 76, 12-FC |
| Seventh | 121 | Cebu | Oslob | 62 |
| Seventh | 121 | Cebu | Talisay | 65, 66, 7-FC |
| Seventh | 121 | Cebu | Toledo | 29, 59, 99, 100, 8-FC |
| Seventh | 121 | Cebu City | | 5, 6, 7, 8, 9, 10, 11, 12, 13, 14, 15, 16, 17, 18, 19, 20, 21, 22, 23, 24, 57, 58, 74, 3-FC |
| Seventh | 121 | Lapu-Lapu City | | 27, 53, 54, 67, 68, 69, 70, 71, 72, 73, 5-FC |
| Seventh | 121 | Mandaue | | 28, 55, 56, 83, 84, 85, 86, 87, 88, 89, 6-FC |
| Seventh | 121 | Negros Oriental | Bais | 45, 75, 18-FC |
| Seventh | 121 | Negros Oriental | Bayawan | 63, 15-FC |
| Seventh | 121 | Negros Oriental | Canlaon | 19-FC |
| Seventh | 121 | Negros Oriental | Dumaguete | 30, 31, 32, 33, 34, 35, 36, 37, 38, 39, 40, 41, 42, 13-FC |
| Seventh | 121 | Negros Oriental | Guihulngan | 64, 102, 16-FC |
| Seventh | 121 | Negros Oriental | Mabinay | 14-FC |
| Seventh | 121 | Negros Oriental | Tanjay | 43, 17-FC |
| Seventh | 121 | Siquijor | Larena | 46 |
| Seventh | 121 | Siquijor | Siquijor | 20-FC |
| Eighth | 58 | Biliran | Caibiran | 37 |
| Eighth | 58 | Biliran | Naval | 16, 1-FC |
| Eighth | 58 | Eastern Samar | Balangiga | 42 |
| Eighth | 58 | Eastern Samar | Borongan | 1, 2, 2-FC |
| Eighth | 58 | Eastern Samar | Dolores | 4, 3-FC |
| Eighth | 58 | Eastern Samar | Guiuan | 3 |
| Eighth | 58 | Eastern Samar | Oras | 5 |
| Eighth | 58 | Leyte | Abuyog | 10 |
| Eighth | 58 | Leyte | Baybay | 14, 6-FC |
| Eighth | 58 | Leyte | Burauen | 15 |
| Eighth | 58 | Leyte | Calubian | 11 |
| Eighth | 58 | Leyte | Carigara | 13, 36 |
| Eighth | 58 | Leyte | Hilongos | 18 |
| Eighth | 58 | Leyte | Ormoc | 12, 35, 47, 5-FC |
| Eighth | 58 | Leyte | Palompon | 17 |
| Eighth | 58 | Northern Samar | Allen | 23 |
| Eighth | 58 | Northern Samar | Catarman | 19, 20, 7-FC |
| Eighth | 58 | Northern Samar | Gamay | 38 |
| Eighth | 58 | Northern Samar | Laoang | 21, 22 |
| Eighth | 58 | Samar | Basey | 30 |
| Eighth | 58 | Samar | Calbayog | 31, 32, 9-FC |
| Eighth | 58 | Samar | Calbiga | 33 |
| Eighth | 58 | Samar | Catbalogan | 27, 28, 29, 8-FC |
| Eighth | 58 | Samar | Gandara | 41 |
| Eighth | 58 | Samar | Tarangnan | 40 |
| Eighth | 58 | Southern Leyte | Maasin | 24, 25, 10-FC |
| Eighth | 58 | Southern Leyte | San Juan | 26 |
| Eighth | 58 | Southern Leyte | Sogod | 39, 11-FC |
| Eighth | 58 | Tacloban | | 6, 7, 8, 9, 34, 43, 44, 45, 46, 4-FC |
| Ninth | 52 | Basilan | Isabela | 1, 2, 1-FC |
| Ninth | 52 | Sulu | Jolo | 3, 10-FC |
| Ninth | 52 | Sulu | Parang | 4 |
| Ninth | 52 | Sulu | Siasi | 25 |
| Ninth | 52 | Tawi-Tawi | Bongao | 5, 2-FC |
| Ninth | 52 | Tawi-Tawi | Sapa-Sapa | 26 |
| Ninth | 52 | Zamboanga City | | 12, 13, 14, 15, 16, 17, 32, 33, 34, 35, 38, 39, 40, 41, 7-FC |
| Ninth | 52 | Zamboanga del Norte | Dapitan | 4-FC |
| Ninth | 52 | Zamboanga del Norte | Dipolog | 6, 7, 8, 9, 10, 3-FC |
| Ninth | 52 | Zamboanga del Norte | Liloy | 28, 38 |
| Ninth | 52 | Zamboanga del Norte | Sindangan | 11, 5-FC |
| Ninth | 52 | Zamboanga del Norte | Siocon | 27 |
| Ninth | 52 | Zamboanga del Sur | Aurora | 30 |
| Ninth | 52 | Zamboanga del Sur | Molave | 23, 8-FC |
| Ninth | 52 | Zamboanga del Sur | Pagadian | 18, 19, 20, 21, 22, 6-FC |
| Ninth | 52 | Zamboanga del Sur | San Miguel | 29 |
| Ninth | 52 | Zamboanga Sibugay | Imelda | 31 |
| Ninth | 52 | Zamboanga Sibugay | Ipil | 24, 36, 37, 9-FC |
| Tenth | 68 | Agusan del Norte | Cabadbaran | 34, 2-FC |
| Tenth | 68 | Agusan del Sur | Bayugan | 7, 3-FC |
| Tenth | 68 | Agusan del Sur | Prosperidad | 6, 4-FC |
| Tenth | 68 | Agusan del Sur | Trento | 55 |
| Tenth | 68 | Bukidnon | Malaybalay | 8, 9, 10, 45, 46, 47, 48, 5-FC |
| Tenth | 68 | Bukidnon | Manolo Fortich | 11 |
| Tenth | 68 | Bukidnon | Valencia | 6-FC |
| Tenth | 68 | Butuan | | 1, 2, 3, 4, 5, 33, 1-FC |
| Tenth | 68 | Cagayan de Oro | | 17, 18, 19, 20, 21, 22, 23, 24, 25, 37, 38, 39, 40, 41, 11-FC |
| Tenth | 68 | Camiguin | Mambajao | 28, 7-FC |
| Tenth | 68 | Dinagat Islands | San Jose | 32, 16-FC |
| Tenth | 68 | Misamis Occidental | Calamba | 36 |
| Tenth | 68 | Misamis Occidental | Oroquieta | 12, 13, 14, 8-FC |
| Tenth | 68 | Misamis Occidental | Ozamiz | 15, 35, 50, 9-FC |
| Tenth | 68 | Misamis Occidental | Tangub | 16, 10-FC |
| Tenth | 68 | Misamis Oriental | El Salvador | 13-FC |
| Tenth | 68 | Misamis Oriental | Gingoog | 27, 43, 12-FC |
| Tenth | 68 | Misamis Oriental | Initao | 44, 49 |
| Tenth | 68 | Misamis Oriental | Medina | 26, 42 |
| Tenth | 68 | Surigao del Norte | Dapa | 31 |
| Tenth | 68 | Surigao del Norte | Mainit | 15-FC |
| Tenth | 68 | Surigao del Norte | Surigao City | 29, 30, 14-FC |
| Eleventh | 77 | Davao City | | 8, 9, 10, 11, 12, 13, 14, 15, 16, 17, 33, 52, 53, 54, 6-FC |
| Eleventh | 77 | Davao de Oro | Compostela | 56 |
| Eleventh | 77 | Davao de Oro | Mabini | 57 |
| Eleventh | 77 | Davao de Oro | Nabunturan | 3, 1-FC |
| Eleventh | 77 | Davao del Norte | Panabo | 4, 34, 3-FC |
| Eleventh | 77 | Davao del Norte | Samal | 4-FC |
| Eleventh | 77 | Davao del Norte | Tagum | 1, 2, 30, 31, 2-FC |
| Eleventh | 77 | Davao del Sur | Bansalan | 21 |
| Eleventh | 77 | Davao del Sur | Digos | 18, 19, 61, 5-FC |
| Eleventh | 77 | Davao del Sur | Santa Cruz | 7-FC |
| Eleventh | 77 | Davao Oriental | Baganga | 7 |
| Eleventh | 77 | Davao Oriental | Lupon | 32, 9-FC |
| Eleventh | 77 | Davao Oriental | Mati | 5, 6, 8-FC |
| Eleventh | 77 | General Santos | | 22, 23, 35, 36, 37, 55, 58, 59, 60, 11-FC |
| Eleventh | 77 | Sarangani | Alabel | 38, 46, 47, 48, 49, 50, 10-FC |
| Eleventh | 77 | South Cotabato | Koronadal | 24, 25, 42, 43, 12-FC |
| Eleventh | 77 | South Cotabato | Polomolok | 39, 62, 63, 13-FC |
| Eleventh | 77 | South Cotabato | Surallah | 26, 44, 45 |
| Eleventh | 77 | Surigao del Sur | Bislig | 29, 46, 14-FC |
| Eleventh | 77 | Surigao del Sur | Cantilan | 41 |
| Eleventh | 77 | Surigao del Sur | Lianga | 28 |
| Eleventh | 77 | Surigao del Sur | Tandag | 27, 40, 15-FC |
| Twelfth | 41 | Cotabato | Kabacan | 16, 22 |
| Twelfth | 41 | Cotabato | Kidapawan | 17, 23, 61, 7-FC |
| Twelfth | 41 | Cotabato | Midsayap | 18, 24, 28, 8-FC |
| Twelfth | 41 | Cotabato City | | 13, 14, 27, 5-FC |
| Twelfth | 41 | Iligan | | 1, 2, 3, 4, 5, 6, 1-FC |
| Twelfth | 41 | Lanao del Norte | Kapatagan | 21 |
| Twelfth | 41 | Lanao del Norte | Tubod | 7, 2-FC |
| Twelfth | 41 | Lanao del Sur | Malabang | 11, 12, 4-FC |
| Twelfth | 41 | Lanao del Sur | Marawi | 8, 9, 10, 3-FC |
| Twelfth | 41 | Lanao del Sur | Wao | 26 |
| Twelfth | 41 | Maguindanao del Norte | Datu Odin Sinsuat | 6-FC |
| Twelfth | 41 | Maguindanao del Sur | Shariff Aguak | 15 |
| Twelfth | 41 | Sultan Kudarat | Isulan | 19, 25, 29, 10-FC |
| Twelfth | 41 | Sultan Kudarat | Tacurong | 20, 30, 9-FC |

== See also ==
- Sharia in the Philippines
