= Family Code of the Philippines =

Family law in the Philippines

The Family Code of the Philippines codifies family law in the Philippines.

== History ==
In 1987, President Corazon Aquino enacted into law The Family Code of 1987, which was intended to supplant Book I of the Civil Code concerning persons and family relations. Work on the Family Code had begun as early as 1979, and it had been drafted by two successive committees, the first chaired by future Supreme Court Justice Ruth Romero, and the second chaired by former Supreme Court Justice J.B.L. Reyes. The Civil Code needed amendment via the Family Code in order to alter certain provisions derived from foreign sources which had proven unsuitable to Filipino culture and to attune it to contemporary developments and trends.

== Content ==
The Family Code covers fields of significant public interest, especially the laws on marriage. The definition and requisites for marriage, along with the grounds for annulment, are found in the Family Code, as is the law on conjugal property relations, rules on establishing filiation, and the governing provisions on support, parental authority, and adoption.

- Marriage
- Legal separation
- Spousal rights and obligations
- Marital property schemes
- The Family
- Paternity and filiation
- Adoption
- Maintenance (e.g. alimony, child support)
- Parental authority
- Emancipation and age of majority
- Summary judicial proceedings in family law
