= Bongbong Marcos 2022 presidential campaign =

Presidential campaign for the 2022 Philippine presidential elections

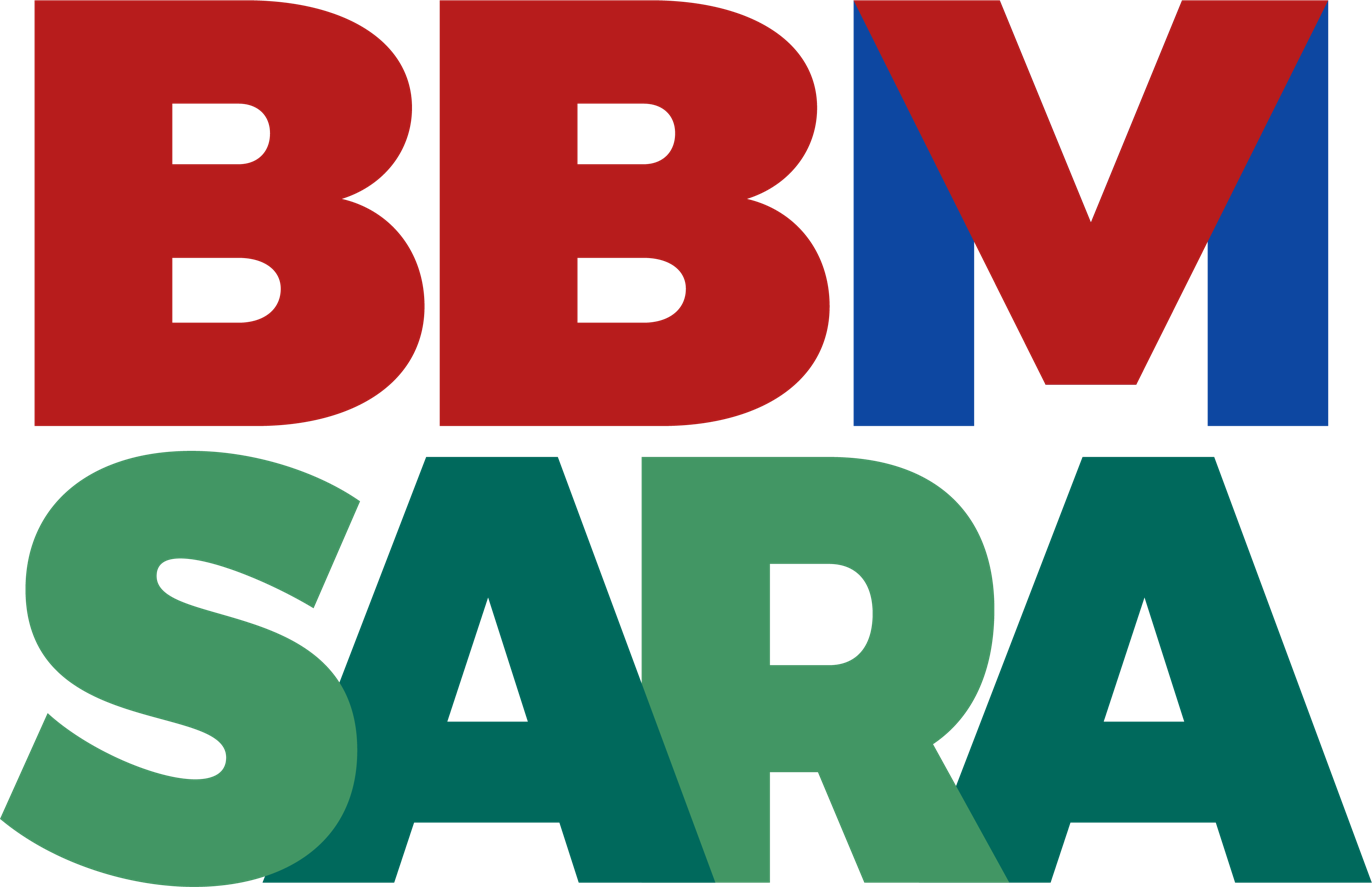
- Campaign: 2022 Philippine presidential election
- Candidate: Bongbong Marcos; Senator of the Philippines (2010–2016); Ilocos Norte's 2nd district representative (1992–1995; 2007–2010); Governor of Ilocos Norte (1983–1986; 1998–2007); Vice Governor of Ilocos Norte (1980–1983); Sara Duterte; Mayor of Davao City (2010–2013; 2016–2022); Vice Mayor of Davao City (2007–2010)
- Affiliation: UniTeam; PFP; Lakas; HNP; PMP; Other political parties KBL; Labor; Nacionalista; PRP; PDP–Laban; PDDS; PPP
- Status: Announced: October 5, 2021 Official launch: February 8, 2022; Won election: May 9, 2022 Inaugurated: Bongbong Marcos: June 30, 2022; Sara Duterte: June 19, 2022
- Headquarters: EDSA, Mandaluyong, Metro Manila
- Key people: Benhur Abalos (national campaign manager)
- Slogan(s): Sama-sama tayong babangon muli (transl. Together, we will rise again); Mahalin natin ang Pilipinas (transl. Let's love the Philippines); Bangon bayan muli (transl. Nation, rise again)

Website
- Official website UniTeam official website

The 2022 presidential campaign of Bongbong Marcos began on October 6, 2021, when he filed his candidacy for the 2022 Philippine presidential elections under the Partido Federal ng Pilipinas. Bongbong Marcos, a former senator from 2010 to 2016, is the son of former president Ferdinand Marcos.

Despite losing in the 2016 Philippine vice presidential election and his subsequent electoral protest, Marcos expressed his interest in running again for a national position in 2022. After being nominated by several parties, Marcos officially announced his candidacy on October 5, 2021, and filed his candidacy a day later. Marcos selected Duterte's daughter and incumbent mayor of Davao City since 2016, Sara Duterte, as his vice presidential running mate. An electoral alliance for their campaign, called the UniTeam alliance, was formed on November 29, 2021. Their campaign was officially launched on February 8, 2022 at the Philippine Arena.

Marcos ran on a platform that promised broad continuity of incumbent president Rodrigo Duterte's policies, such as infrastructure development and his foreign policy, alongside some of Duterte's controversial programs. His campaign's messaging was also mainly focused on uniting the country. His candidacy faced staunch opposition from various groups, particularly due to his father's regime, marked by widespread corruption and human rights abuses. There were also several petitions against his bid, many of which are based on his 1995 conviction for failing to file tax returns. The petitions were denied by the Commission on Elections and the Supreme Court.

Marcos won the election in a landslide victory, garnering 58.77% of the vote with a margin of 30.83% over the second placer, Leni Robredo. Marcos became the first majority president since the establishment of the Fifth Republic in 1986, winning the largest majority since 1981 (although the opposition boycotted that election), and since 1969 for a competitive election. He is also the second president from Ilocos Norte after his father. Meanwhile, his running mate, Duterte, also became the first majority vice president of the Fifth Republic, winning the largest majority since 1969 and garnering the most votes for any office in a single-winner election in Philippine history. They are the first presidential ticket to win together since 2004.

== Background ==
=== 2016 vice presidential campaign and electoral protest ===
Marcos ran in the 2016 Philippine vice presidential election as the running mate of Miriam Defensor Santiago. A highly contested race, Marcos ultimately lost to then congresswoman Leni Robredo by 263,473 votes or by 0.64 percent, the narrowest margin since the 1965 vice presidential election. Marcos subsequently filed an electoral protest on June 29, 2016; this would be dismissed by the Presidential Electoral Tribunal on February 16, 2021.

=== Speculation and nominations ===
By January 2020, Bongbong Marcos confirmed that he was running for a national position in 2022, although he did not specify a specific position. On September 21, 2021, the Partido Federal ng Pilipinas (PFP; transl. Federal Party of the Philippines) nominated Marcos to run for president. During the national convention of the Kilusang Bagong Lipunan (KBL; transl. New Society Movement) in Binangonan, the party founded by his father, he was nominated as the party's candidate for president. Marcos, who remained a member of the Nacionalista Party, thanked KBL for the nomination, but said that he would announce his plans "when the time comes."

== Campaign ==
=== Announcement ===
On October 5, Marcos announced his presidential candidacy. Marcos then resigned from the Nacionalistas and was sworn in at the PFP chairman. Marcos ultimately filed his presidential candidacy under the PFP on October 6. According to his wife, Liza, Marcos was watching Ant-Man, a movie about an ex-convict thief turned Avenger superhero, when he told her "Okay, we're gonna do this... run for the presidency".

==== Running mate ====
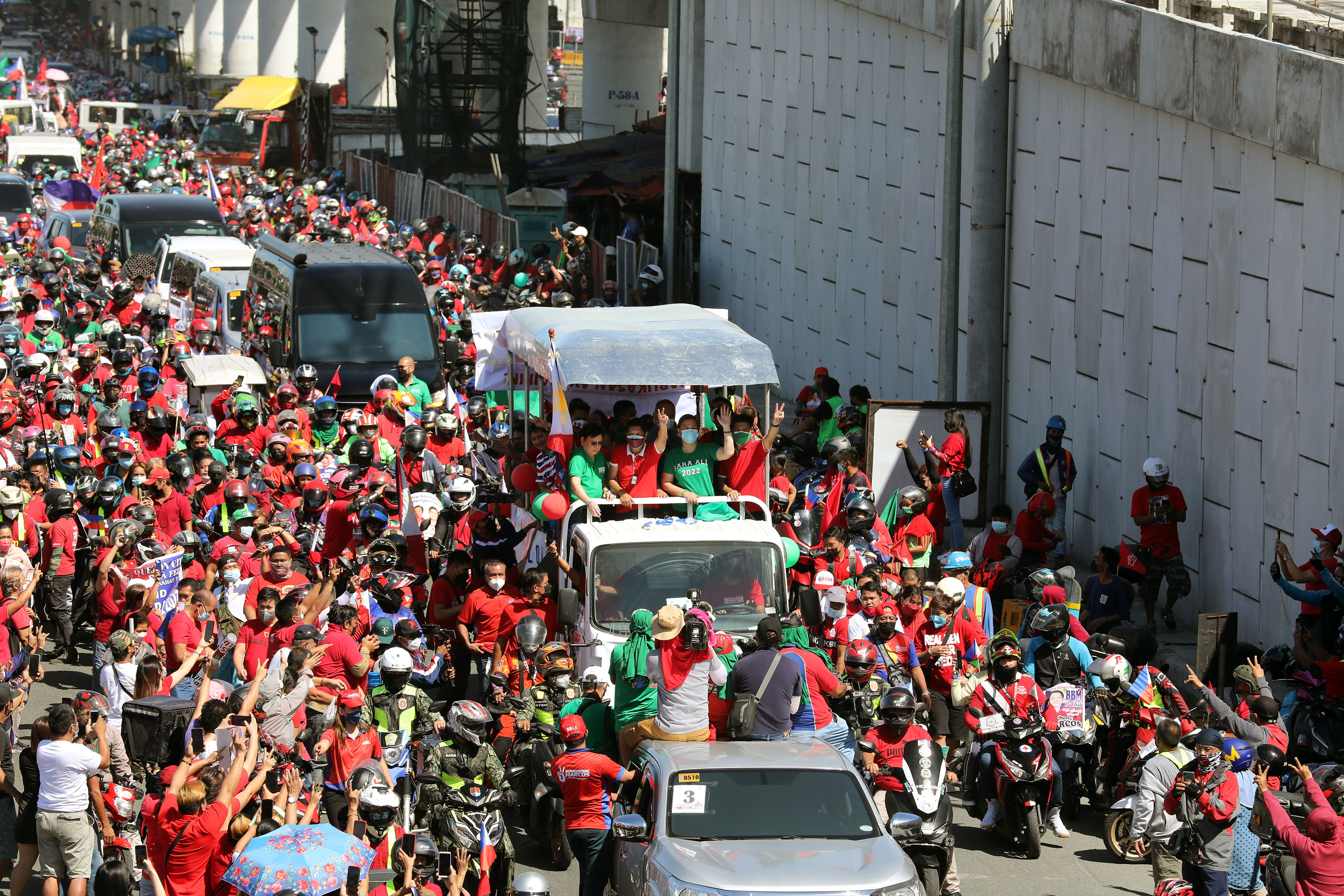
Marcos and Duterte waving to supporters during a campaign caravan in Quezon City.

Davao City mayor Sara Duterte was previously seen as President Duterte's successor, particularly after her role as a powerbroker in the midterms. On July 9, 2021, Duterte stated that she is open to running for president. However, despite being a frontrunner in early opinion polls, she did not file a candidacy for a national position; she instead ran for re-election in the Davao mayoral race. On November 9, Duterte withdrew her candidacy for re-election as Davao City mayor. Two days later, she resigned from her regional party and joined the Lakas–CMD, a national party. On November 13, she launched her run for the vice presidency under Lakas–CMD by substituting Lyle Uy, who withdrew from the race. Shortly after the announcement, Marcos' party adopted her as their candidate for vice president.

On November 16, Sara Duterte confirmed she had sought support from political parties for her and Marcos' bids in the 2022 elections. Hours later, Marcos said in a statement that, "Mayor Inday Sara Duterte and I have finished the process for the partnership that our supporters have been hoping for — BBM-Sara for 2022."

=== UniTeam ===
Formed on November 29, 2021, UniTeam is a loose electoral coalition supporting the candidacies of Bongbong Marcos and Sara Duterte in the 2022 presidential elections. The alliance is composed of four political parties, the Hugpong ng Pagbabago, Lakas-CMD, Pwersa ng Masang Pilipino, and with Partido Federal ng Pilipinas as its convenor.

=== Branding ===
Marcos' messaging is centered on nationalism and uniting the country, emphasizing the need for unity to recover from the pandemic. His campaign slogan, "Sama-sama tayong babangon muli" (Together, we shall rise again), also reflects this message. The colors predominantly used by the campaign are red and green; red is associated with the Kilusang Bagong Lipunan, the party of former president Ferdinand Marcos, his father, while green is the campaign color of Duterte. Supporters of the tandem also use the V sign, which symbolizes political victory and is associated with the Marcos family. Aside from the clenched fist, that was the hand sign of her father, Sara Duterte also had her own hand symbol, her right hand on her chest. This is derived from her slogan "Mahalin Natin ang Pilipinas" (Let's love the Philippines). Songs frequently used during the campaign include "Umagang Kay Ganda" by Butch Monserrat and the New Society era song "Bagong Pagsilang" by Levi Celerio.

=== Rallies ===
Locations where Marcos held campaign rallies outside of Metro Manila during his 2022 presidential campaign.
Locations where Marcos held campaign rallies during his 2022 presidential campaign throughout Metro Manila.

On December 9, 2021, Marcos and his running mate, Sara Duterte, held a "grand caravan" across Metro Manila. Due to the influx of supporters, the motorcade caused heavy traffic along Commonwealth Avenue.

While most tickets had their proclamation rallies in the respective hometowns of the presidential candidate, the Marcos and Duterte tandem started their campaign at the Philippine Arena in Bulacan. The Marcos campaign explained that they chose the Philippine Arena so as to seat their thousands of supporters, of which 25,000 tickets were made available. On April 1, nine days before the start of overseas voting, the UniTeam tandem held a virtual miting de avance for Overseas Filipino Workers (OFWs). Marcos held his miting de avance in Parañaque in which 1,000,000 supporters showed up in support.

Some of Marcos' rallies have been controversial. A scheduled campaign rally was supposed to be held in Antique on February 24 but was postponed after residents reportedly protested against the rally. During a UniTeam rally in Nueva Ecija, reports emerged of people receiving envelopes of cash after the event. The Commission on Elections (COMELEC) stated they will launch an investigation if there are formal evidence and complainants. The local government later clarified that it was distributing cash aid and that it was scheduled after the rally on the same venue, while the PFP denied claims that it was engaging in vote buying. On April 2, Marcos held rallies in Tarlac; his rally in Tarlac City attracted controversy after a statue of Benigno Aquino Jr., one of the leaders against his father's regime, was blocked by a tent.

List of Marcos' campaign rallies
Date	Venue	City/Municipality	Province	Estimated attendance (Note: If available, the estimated attendance figures are that of third-party authorities, such as the Philippine National Police.)	Ref.
Feb 8	Philippine Arena	Bocaue	Bulacan	25,000	
Feb 10	WES Arena	Valenzuela	–	8,000	
Feb 13	Nueve de Febrero	Mandaluyong	–	30,000	
Feb 14	Amoranto Sports Complex	Quezon City	–		
Feb 16	Paoay Sand Dunes	Paoay	Ilocos Norte	15,000	
Feb 17	Quirino Stadium	Bantay	Ilocos Sur	10,000	
Feb 17	Narvacan Farmers Market	Narvacan	Ilocos Sur		
Feb 19	Barangay 185	Caloocan	–		
Feb 23	Reclamation Area	Bacolod	Negros Occidental	80,000	
Feb 24	Tamasak Arena	Barotac Nuevo	Iloilo	10,000	
Feb 24	Barotac Nuevo Plaza Field	Barotac Nuevo	Iloilo	15,000	
Feb 24	Guimbal Stadium	Guimbal	Iloilo	Postponed	
Feb 24	Binirayan Sports Complex	San Jose de Buenavista	Antique	Postponed	
Feb 26		Alaminos	Pangasinan	7,000	
Feb 28	St. Vincent Ferrer Prayer Park	Bayambang	Pangasinan	30,000	
Mar 3	Balayan Government Center	Balayan	Batangas		
Mar 4	Sorsogon Provincial Capitol	Sorsogon City	Sorsogon		
Mar 5	Social Center	Masbate City	Masbate		
Mar 8	Santa Clara	Santa Maria	Bulacan		
Mar 8	Meycauayan College Gym	Meycauayan	Bulacan	26,000	
Mar 8	Guiguinto Municipal Oval	Guiguinto	Bulacan	54,000	
Mar 9	Abra Sports Complex	Bangued	Abra		
Mar 10	CARAA Ground	Tabuk	Kalinga		
Mar 11	Laguna Provincial Capitol	Santa Cruz	Laguna	45,000	
Mar 11	Santa Rosa Sports Complex	Santa Rosa	Laguna	55,000	
Mar 12	Bradco Avenue cor. J.W. Diokno Boulevard	Parañaque	–	Canceled	
Mar 13	The Tent at Vista Global South	Las Piñas	–	18,000	
Mar 15	Barangay Andal Alino Open Field	Talavera	Nueva Ecija	60,000	
Mar 17	Bataan People's Center	Balanga	Bataan		
Mar 17	Zambales Sports Complex	Iba	Zambales	30,000	
Mar 19	Marikina Riverbanks Amphitheater	Marikina	–	130,000	
Mar 20	Barangay Potrero	Malabon	–		
Mar 22	General Trias Sports Park	General Trias	Cavite	140,000	
Mar 23	Quezon Convention Center	Lucena	Quezon		
Mar 27	Polomolok Gymnasium	Polomolok	South Cotabato	38,000	
Mar 27	South Cotabato Sports Complex	Koronadal	South Cotabato	80,000	
Mar 28	Carmen Municipal Park	Carmen	Cotabato		
Mar 28	Maguindanao Provincial Capitol	Buluan	Maguindanao		
Mar 28	Lambayong Municipal Hall	Lambayong	Sultan Kudarat		
Mar 28	Sultan Kudarat Provincial Capitol	Isulan	Sultan Kudarat	175,000	
Mar 29	Universidad de Zamboanga Summit Centre	Zamboanga City	Zamboanga del Sur	10,000	
Mar 30	Townsite, Kingking	Pantukan	Davao de Oro		
Mar 30	Carmen Municipal Grounds	Carmen	Davao del Norte		
Mar 30	Desi Heights	Digos	Davao del Sur	120,000	
Mar 31	Provincial Capitol Complex	Marawi	Lanao del Sur		
Mar 31	Capitol Grounds	Malaybalay	Bukidnon	100,000	
Apr 2	Tarlac City Plaza	Tarlac City	Tarlac		
Apr 2	Barangay Cristo Rey Oval	Capas	Tarlac		
Apr 2	Paniqui Public Auditorium	Paniqui	Tarlac	90,000	
Apr 8	University of Eastern Philippines	Catarman	Northern Samar	7,000	
Apr 8	Plaza de Santiago	Borongan	Eastern Samar		
Apr 8	Samar Provincial Capitol	Catbalogan	Samar		
Apr 8	Naval Gymnasium	Naval	Biliran		
Apr 9	Maasin Terminal	Maasin	Southern Leyte	Canceled	
Apr 9	Baybay City Convention Center	Baybay	Leyte	60,000	
Apr 9	Ormoc City Superdome	Ormoc	Leyte	20,000	
Apr 9	Leyte Sports Complex	Tacloban	Leyte	200,000	
Apr 13	Batasan Road	Quezon City	–		
Apr 18	City di Mare	Cebu City	Cebu	300,000	
Apr 20	LIMA Estate	Lipa	Batangas	94-100,000	
Apr 21	Biñan Football Field	Biñan	Laguna	50,000	
Apr 23	Earnshaw Street	Manila	–	14,000	
Apr 24	Arca South	Taguig	–		
Apr 26	Mindanao Civic Centre	Tubod	Lanao del Norte		
Apr 26	Pelaéz Sports Complex	Cagayan de Oro	Misamis Oriental	200,000	
Apr 29	Sta. Arcadia	Cabanatuan	Nueva Ecija	300,000	
Apr 29	Robinsons Starmills	San Fernando	Pampanga	250,000	
Apr 30	Paglaum Sports Complex	Bacolod	Negros Occidental	15,000	
May 1	Isabela Sports Complex	Ilagan	Isabela		
May 3	Guimbal Football Field	Guimbal	Iloilo		
May 5	City Hall Grounds	Tagum	Davao del Norte		
May 7	Block 7, Aseana City	Parañaque	–	1,000,000	

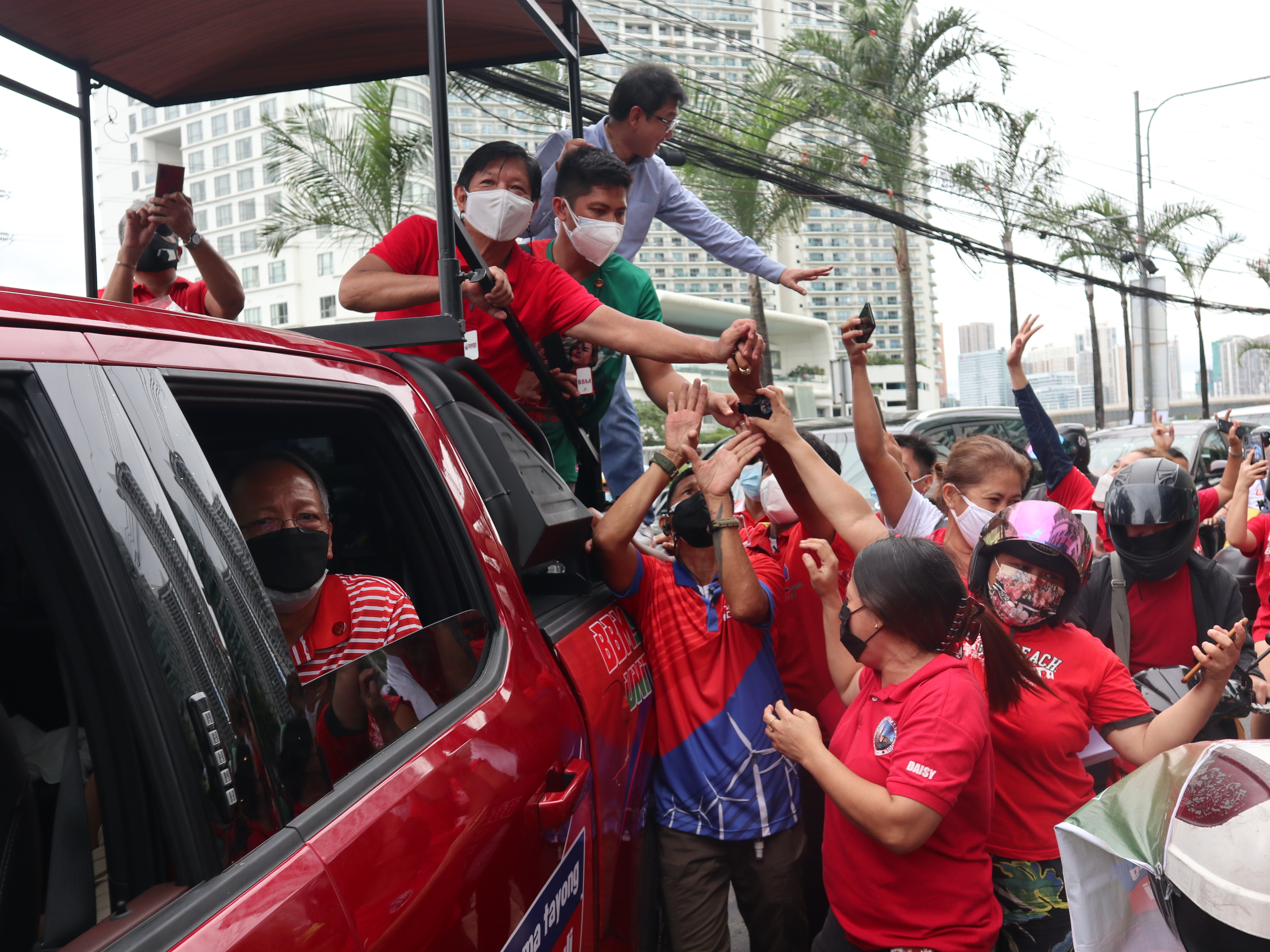
Marcos campaign motorcade in Makati

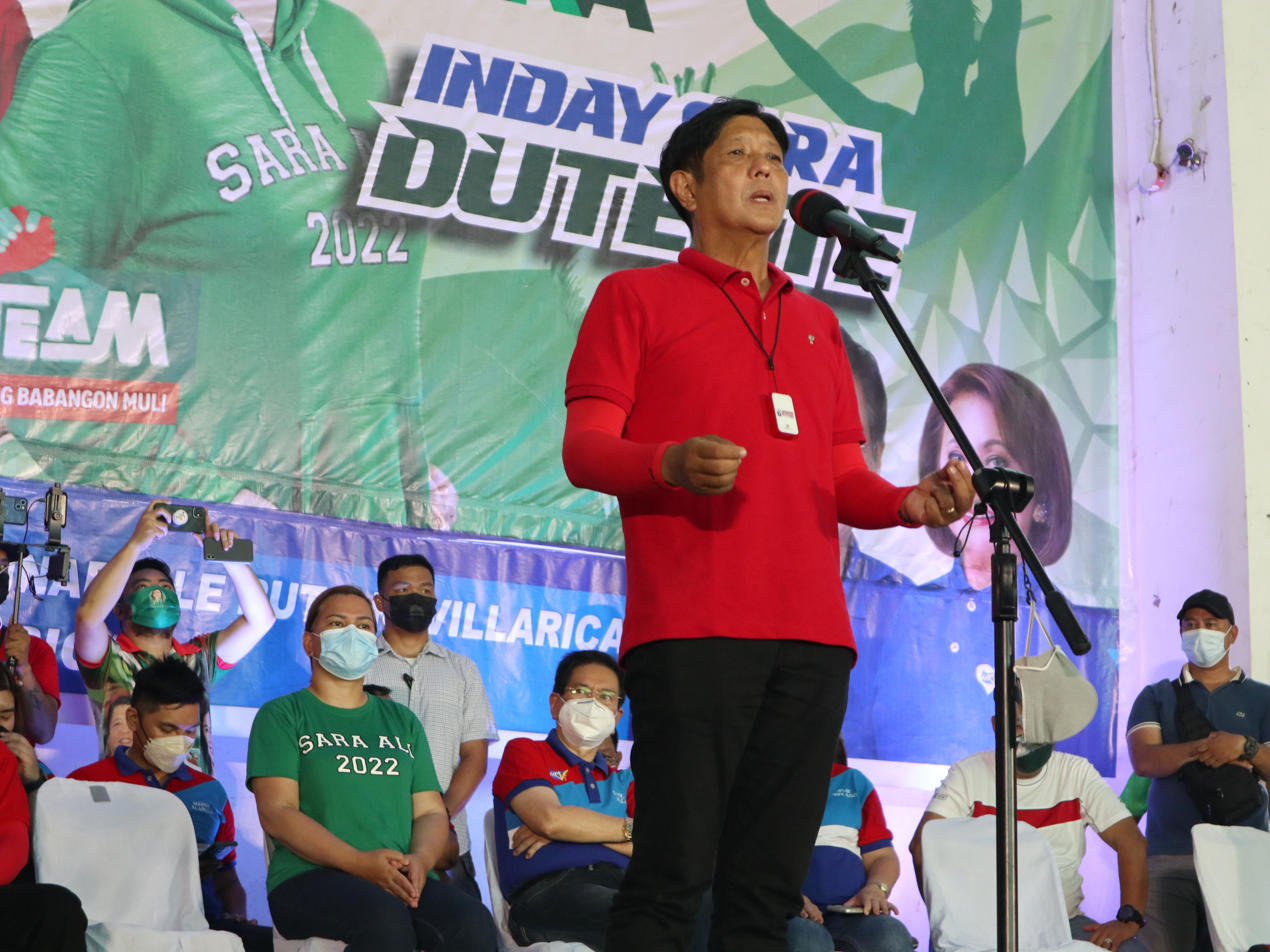
Marcos during a campaign rally in Meycauayan, Bulacan

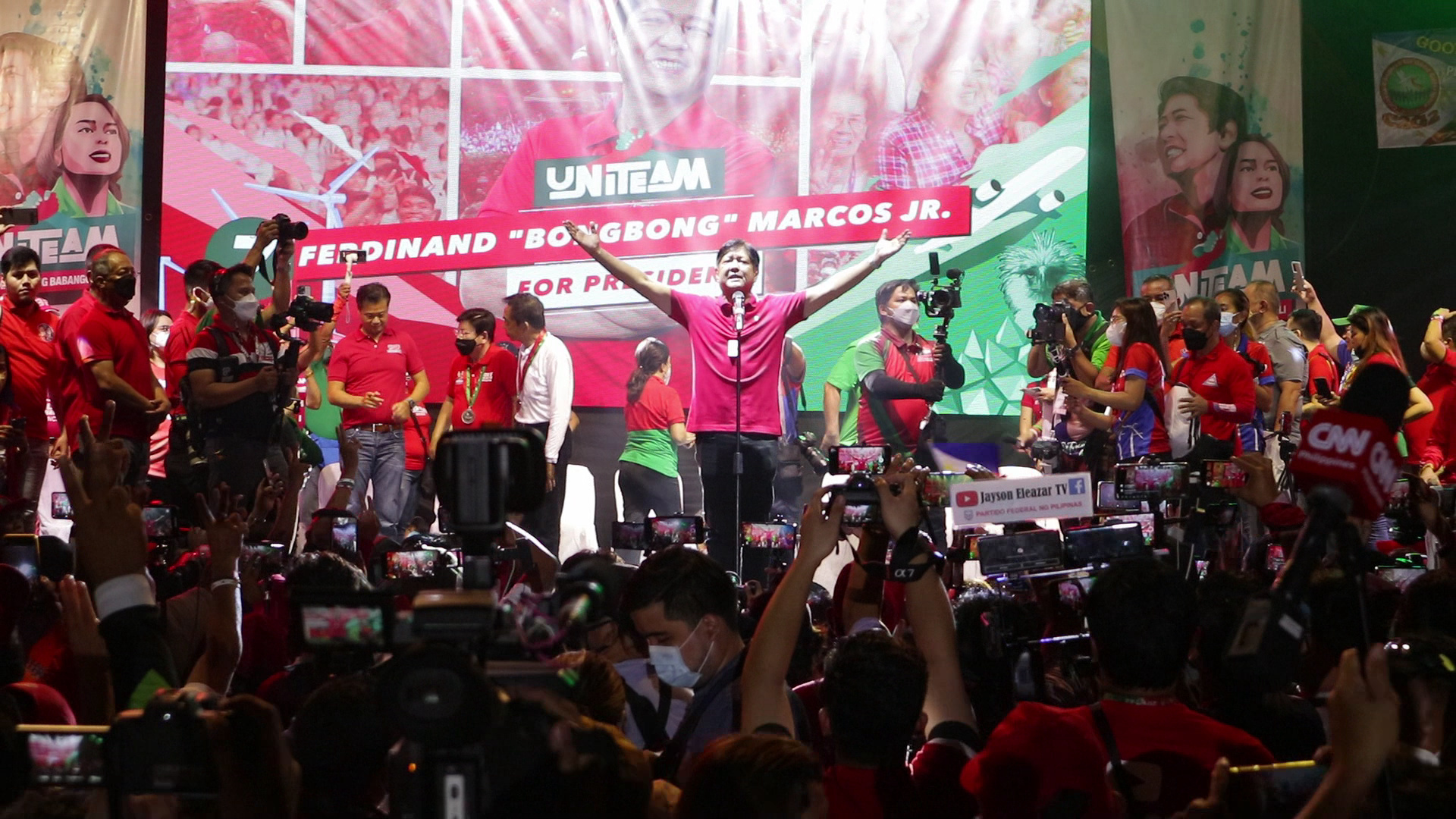
Marcos during a campaign rally in Marikina

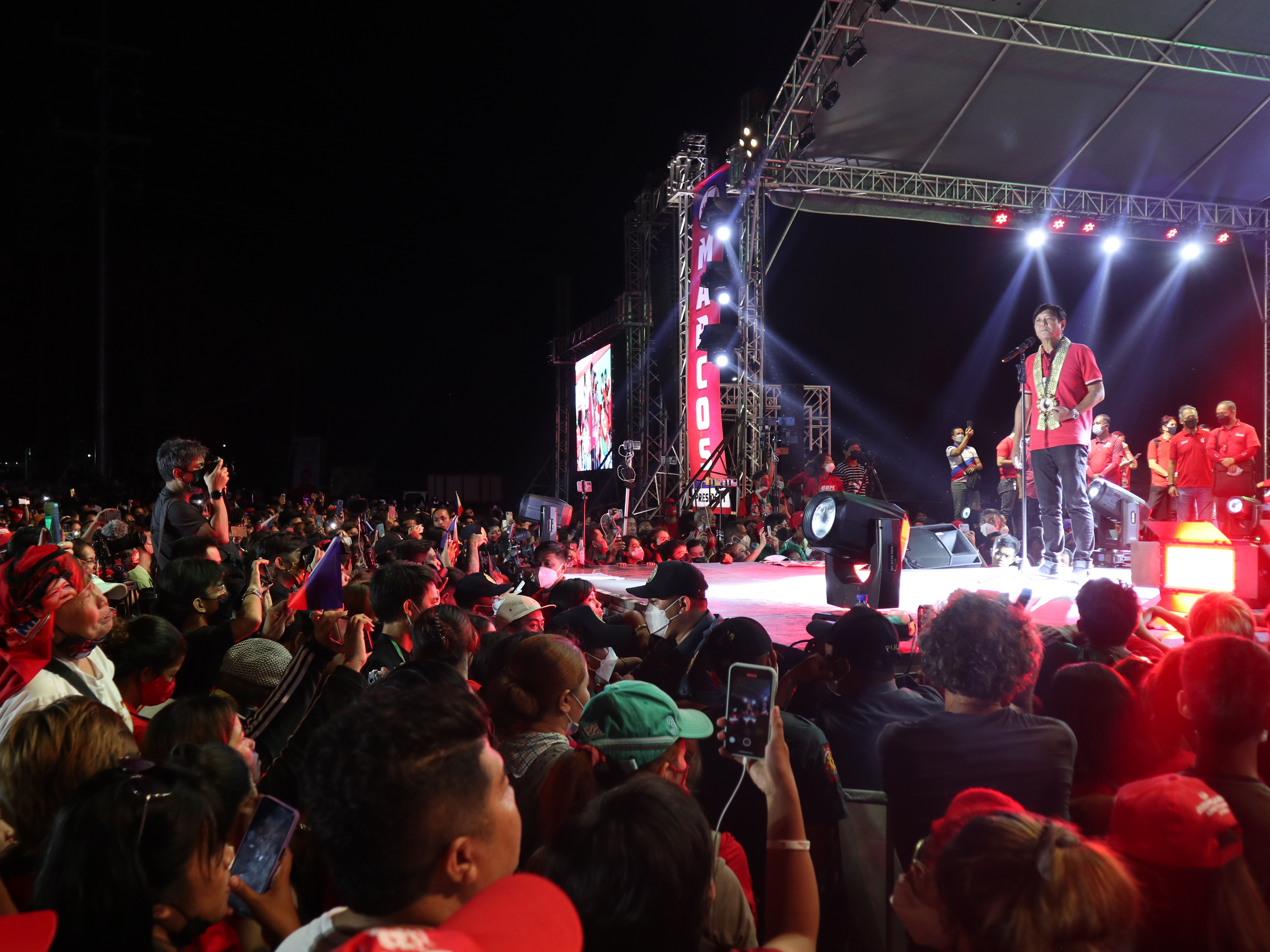
Marcos during a campaign rally in Lipa, Batangas

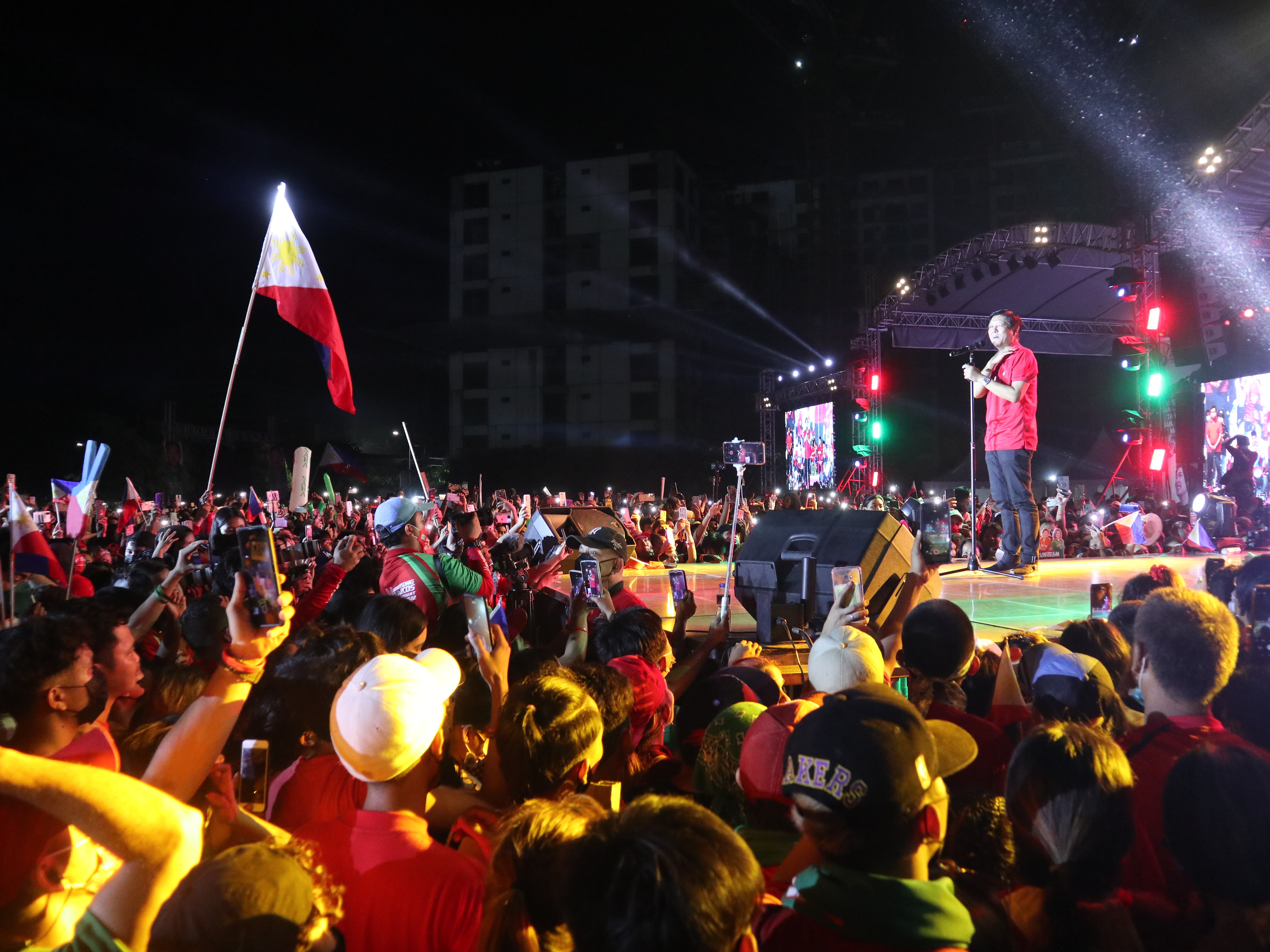
Marcos during campaign rally in Taguig

== Polling ==
Graphical summary

Before the filing of candidacies, Marcos mostly polled behind his running mate, Duterte. The earliest Pulse Asia survey, conducted on November 23 to December 2, 2020, showed Marcos garnering 14 percentage points, 12 points behind Duterte. After Duterte did not run for president, Marcos' numbers significantly increased. The October 2021 Social Weather Stations (SWS) opinion poll showed Marcos polling ahead of all presidential candidates, getting 47 percentage points of voting intentions. Another poll conducted on the same period by Publicus Asia showed Marcos polling at 49.3 percentage points. After Duterte announced her vice presidential bid and became his running mate, Marcos' numbers rose; the next Publicus Asia survey conducted immediately after the substitution period showed Marcos getting 56.7 percentage points. Polls conducted by Pulse Asia and OCTA Research in December 2021 showed Marcos at 53 and 54 percentage points respectively. According to Pulse Asia director Ana Maria Tabunda, this was the first time a presidential candidate held a majority preference in their polls.

By early 2022, Marcos emerged as a clear frontrunner in all major polls, leading by at least 30 percentage points ahead of the next candidate, Leni Robredo. Marcos' numbers were at its highest on the January 2021 Laylo survey, polling at 64 percentage points. This is the highest a presidential candidate has polled in recent history, since Benigno Aquino III's 60 percentage points in an SWS September 2009 opinion poll. Pulse Asia also recorded similar numbers; its January 2022 survey showed Marcos polling at 60 percent. By mid-March, despite his absence in major debates and forums, his numbers did not decrease. A survey conducted by Pulse Asia following the first PiliPinas Debates 2022 showed Marcos' numbers decreasing marginally by four points; although his lead narrowed from 45 to 32 percentage points, after Robredo's numbers substantially increased by nine. By the end of the campaign period, Marcos consistently lead all opinion polls; a final poll by Publicus Asia showed Marcos leading 54%–22.

== Petitions against Marcos' presidential bid ==
There were seven petitions against Marcos' presidential bid. Three petitions aimed to cancel Marcos' certificate of candidacy (COC), one petition aimed to declare Marcos a nuisance candidate, and three petitions aimed to disqualify him. Most of the petitions were based on Marcos' 1995 conviction for failing to file tax returns. Three disqualification petitions were consolidated and raffled to the commission's first division, while three other petitions were handed to the second division. The final petition was also handed to the first division. Marcos has dismissed the petitions as nuisance petitions with no legal basis and propaganda against him.

=== Buenafe, et al. v. Marcos (SPA 21-156) ===
A petition to cancel Marcos’ COC was filed on November 2 by Christian Buenafe. The petition alleges that Marcos committed material misrepresentation in his COC when he stated that he was eligible to run for office despite his 1995 tax case and his failure to submit those documents is a crime of moral turpitude. According to the Omnibus Election Code, a person who committed a crime involving moral turpitude is barred from holding public office. A group composed of martial law victims represented by lawyer Howard Calleja filed a petition-in-intervention to join this petition against Marcos' candidacy on November 8. Two additional answers-in-intervention were filed by Marcos' camp. The commission rejected the three interventions on December 13 and stated that it will not entertain similar submissions in the future after causing "unduly delay" on the main petition's status.

The petition was raffled to the commission's first division. Marcos was granted an extension to respond to the petition, and a motion against the extension was filed and later denied. A preliminary conference was held on November 26. The two sides have submitted their final arguments to the Commission on Elections (COMELEC). On January 17, the COMELEC's second division dismissed the petition. In a ruling signed by commissioners Antonio Kho and Rey Bulay, the petition was denied due to lack of merit, stating that Marcos did not commit material misrepresentation in his COC and that he is not perpetually disqualified from seeking office. The petitioners have filed a motion for reconsideration, which was later denied by the COMELEC en banc on May 10, 2022, a day after the election was held. The petitioners then elevated the case to the Supreme Court.

=== Consolidated disqualification petitions ===
On November 17, 2021, the Campaign Against the Return of the Marcoses and Martial Law (CARMMA) led by Bonifacio Ilagan filed the first disqualification plea against Marcos. The group initially petitioned to disqualify Marcos from the race and cancel his COC but withdrew that petition and refiled to plea for his disqualification instead. A second petition was filed by Akbayan on December 2, 2021, also citing Marcos' tax conviction. The third petition was made by Abubakar Mangelen, a commissioner for the National Commission on Muslim Filipinos. This petition also aims to nullify Marcos' Certificate of Nomination and Acceptance, with Mangelen maintaining that he is the PFP's chair and that Marcos did not follow the party's procedures. The COMELEC later consolidated the petitions of Ilagan, Akbayan, and Mangelen; a single ruling would be issued for the petitions.

The petition's preliminary conference was held on January 7. Marcos, while not required to attend, was not present at the conference. He was said to be in isolation after being exposed to his staff infected with COVID-19. His absence was criticized by Akbayan, seeking to hold him in contempt for allegedly lying about the reason for his absence. Commissioner Rowena Guanzon later asked for more evidence regarding his reason for skipping the hearing. According to Guanzon, the COMELEC's decision on the consolidated petition was to be made on or before January 17, 2022, but was delayed after the COMELEC's office was closed due to the commission's staff being infected with COVID-19.

On January 28, 2022, Guanzon disclosed that she voted to disqualify Marcos. She also alleged that the decision was being delayed by a senator from Davao. The case's ponente, Aimee Ferolino, criticized her for releasing her opinion before the final ruling. She also asserted that the preliminary conference was delayed to accommodate Guanzon's request to take part in the proceeding and broadcast the hearing, that there was no internal agreement on the January 17 deadline, and that she has allegedly tried to influence her decision on the case. The petitioners welcomed Guanzon's vote while Marcos' party denounced the disclosure and urged the COMELEC en banc to investigate and penalize her. According to election lawyers Romulo Macalintal and Manuelito Luna, Guanzon may have violated the COMELEC's rules in disclosing her opinion as the case is sub judice, while another lawyer has pointed out that there is no law prohibiting her to disclose her opinion ahead of the final decision. Guanzon's vote was not counted as she retired on February 2, 2022, before a promulgation could be made.

On February 10, 2022, the COMELEC's first division denied the consolidated petition due to lack of merit. The 44-page resolution cited the Supreme Court earlier pronouncement that failure to file tax returns is not a crime involving moral turpitude. The resolution also affirmed that the 1977 National Internal Revenue Code did not carry the penalty of perpetual disqualification; this would only take effect under Presidential Decree 1994 on January 1, 1986. The petitioners have criticized the ruling and vowed to appeal it to the COMELEC en banc, while former commissioner Guanzon also condemned the ruling, asserting that Marcos was convicted for not filing his income tax returns. A motion for reconsideration was filed by Akbayan on February 15, 2022, which was denied by the COMELEC en banc on May 10, 2022. On May 18, CARMMA elevated the case to the Supreme Court, stating that Marcos should be disqualified and votes for him should be considered stray votes. The petitioners also asserted that if Marcos is disqualified, Leni Robredo, who placed second, should be declared the winner instead. The group also sought to stop the congressional canvassing of votes, although this was unsuccessful as the canvassing continued as planned.

=== Other petitions ===
==== Lihaylihay v. Marcos (SPA 21-003) ====
Danilo Lihaylihay, a presidential aspirant, filed the first petition against Marcos' bid on October 11. The petition calls on the COMELEC to declare Marcos a nuisance candidate, alleging that Marcos has no genuine intention to run for the office. The electoral commission junked the petition on December 18, 2021, citing insufficient evidence and that Marcos has established his bonafide intention to run.

==== Tiburcio Marcos v. Marcos (SPA 21-180) ====
Tiburcio Marcos, another presidential aspirant, filed a petition to cancel Marcos’ COC, claiming that Marcos was an impostor. Tiburcio, who claims to be "the royal king of the Philippine Islands," alleges that he is the only legitimate son of Ferdinand Marcos and that Bongbong Marcos died in 1975. Marcos has debunked the claim and filed a counter-petition to declare Tiburcio a nuisance candidate. According to the commission's spokesman, the petition was denied before January 2022.

==== Pudno Nga Ilokano v. Marcos (SPA 21-235) ====
The fourth petition, also based on his tax conviction, was filed by Pudno Nga Ilokano on December 7, 2021. The preliminary conference for the plea was held on January 14, 2022. On April 20, 2022, the COMELEC first division dismissed the petition for lack of merit. A motion for reconsideration was filed by the petitioners and later rejected by the COMELEC en banc on May 10, 2022.

== Reactions ==
As the son of the late former president Ferdinand Marcos, Marcos' candidacy has been controversial, garnering criticism from several groups due to his father's regime, a period characterized by violence and oppression against those opposed to his regime, political turmoil, and widespread corruption. In addition, some scholars have noted that his campaign is driven by a massive misinformation campaign aimed at revamping the Marcos brand and smearing his rivals.

=== Protests ===
Rallies have been held to protest Bongbong Marcos's candidacy. In October 2021, more than 100 activists burned effigies of Marcos's father at a protest at the Commission on Human Rights. Protesters recalled the massive human rights violations under Ferdinand Marcos and held up placards with the words "never again".

In November 2021, the Cordillera Peoples Alliance and the Campaign Against the Return of the Marcoses and Martial Law gathered around the bust of Ferdinand Marcos in Benguet and unveiled banners bearing the words "Marcos No Hero", "The North Resists", and "No to Duterte Marcos 2022".

On February 25, 2022, several groups protested against Marcos' candidacy and commemorated the anniversary of the People Power Revolution in EDSA.

== Senatorial slate ==
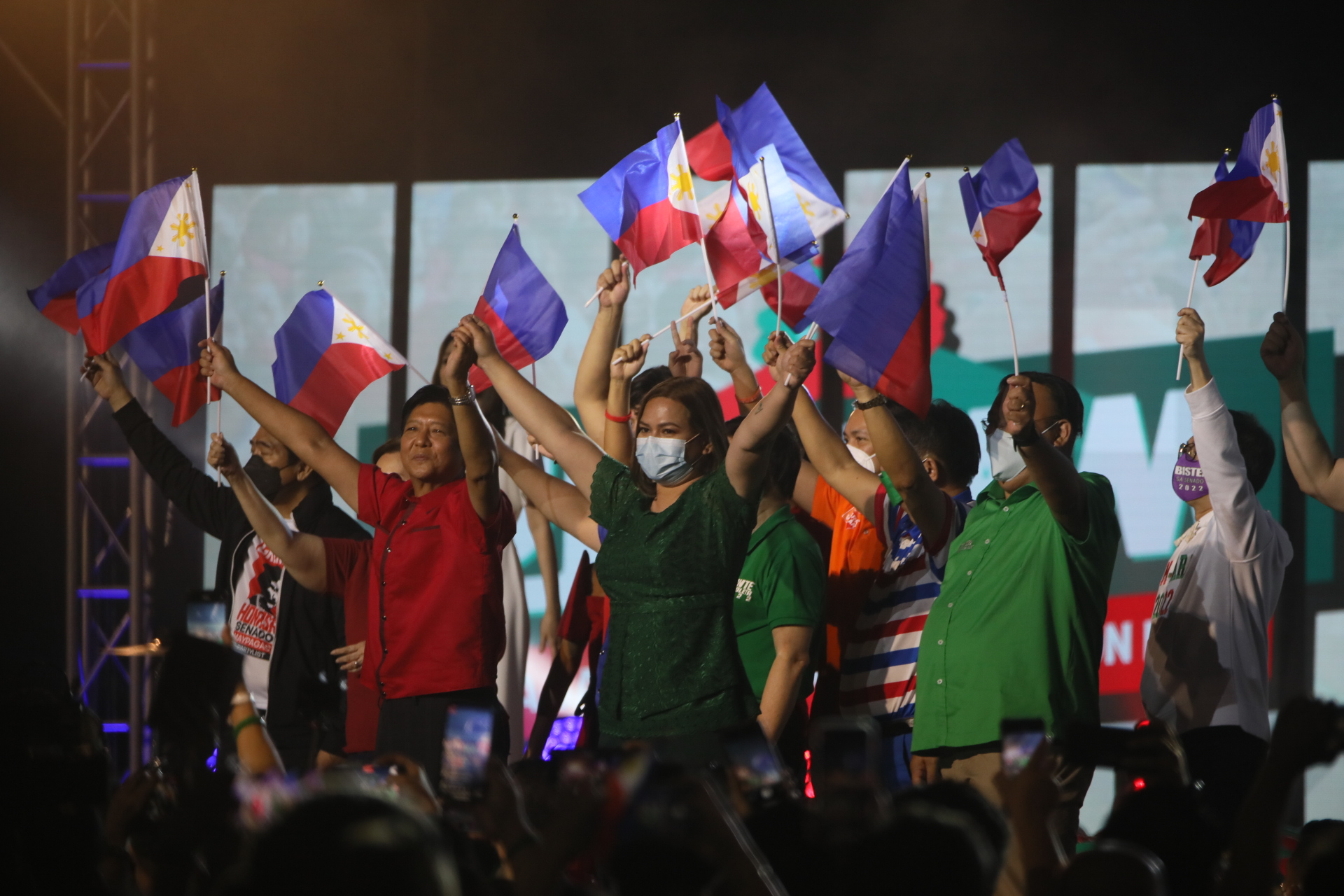
Marcos and Duterte with the UniTeam slate during their proclamation rally at the Philippine Arena on February 8, 2022.

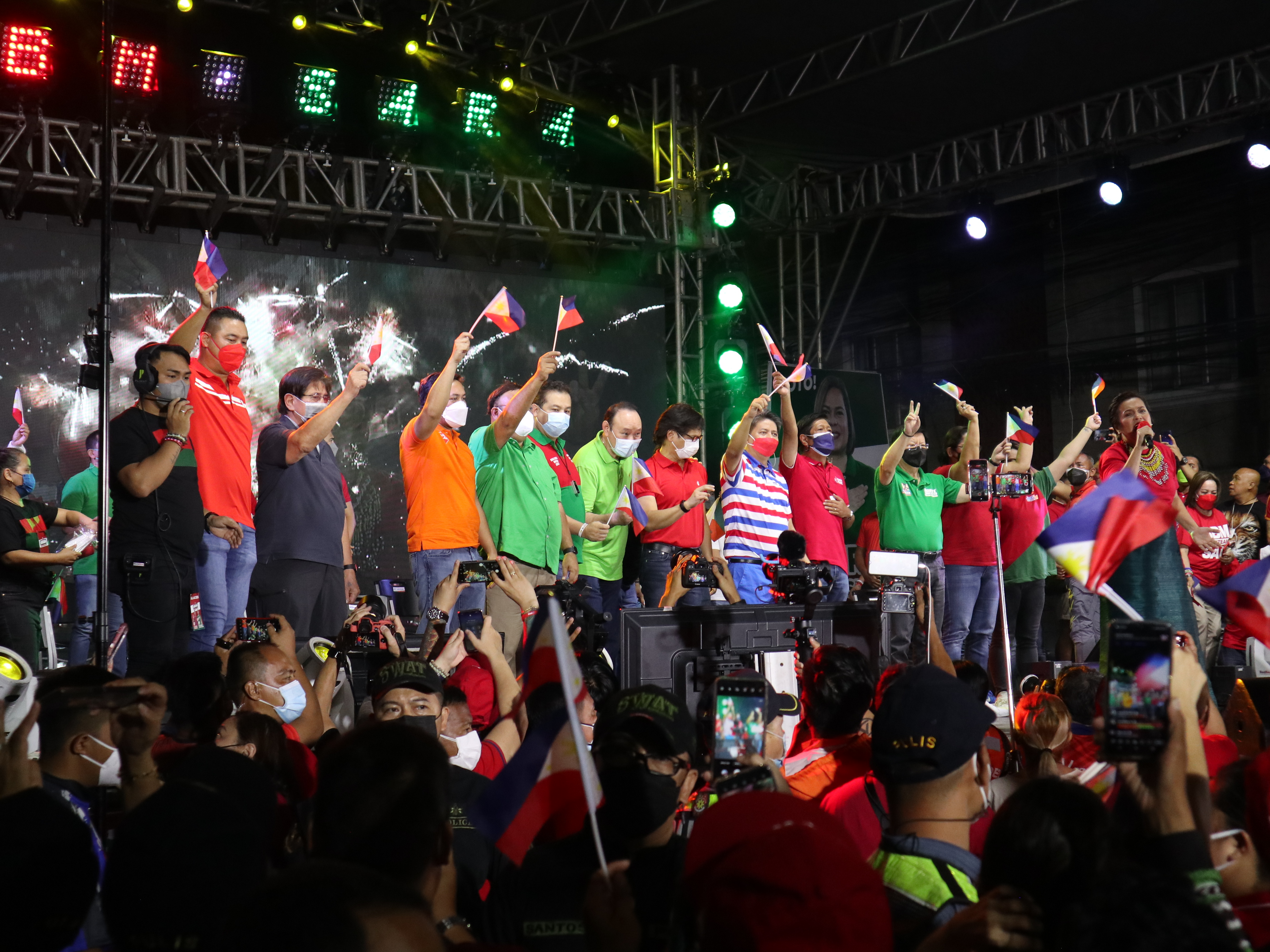
Marcos and Duterte with the UniTeam slate, San Juan Mayor Francis Zamora, Benjamin Abalos Jr., and Leyte–1st Representative Martin Romualdez during their campaign rally in Mandaluyong on February 13, 2022.

Marcos and Duterte have endorsed the following candidates for the 2022 Philippine Senate election, thus who are part of their "senatorial slate":

- Herbert Bautista, actor and former mayor of Quezon City
- Jinggoy Estrada, former senator
- Larry Gadon, disbarred lawyer
- Win Gatchalian, incumbent senator
- Gregorio Honasan, former Secretary of Information and Communications Technology (guest candidate)
- Loren Legarda, incumbent representative of Antique's at-large congressional district and current house deputy speaker (guest candidate)
- ~~Rodante Marcoleta, incumbent representative of the SAGIP party-list and current house deputy speaker~~ (later withdrawn)
- Robin Padilla, actor
- Harry Roque, former presidential spokesperson
- Gilbert Teodoro, former Secretary of National Defense
- Mark Villar, former Secretary of Public Works and Highways
- Migz Zubiri, incumbent senate majority floor leader

The following are endorsed by Sara Duterte although they are not included in the UniTeam slate.

- Jejomar Binay, former vice president
- JV Ejercito, former senator
- Guillermo Eleazar, former Philippine National Police chief
- Francis Escudero, incumbent Sorsogon governor
- Sal Panelo, former presidential spokesperson
- Joel Villanueva, incumbent senator

== Endorsements ==
Bongbong Marcos, alongside his running mate Sara Duterte, has received several endorsements for their campaign. Since the position of president and vice president are elected separately, some personalities endorsed either Marcos or Duterte only; a notable example was President Rodrigo Duterte's endorsement of Sara, his daughter and Marcos' running mate, but not Marcos himself. According to Duterte, the tandem will still accept an endorsement even if the endorsement does not extend to the two of them.

== Political positions ==
=== Abortion ===
Marcos is in favor of decriminalizing abortion in severe cases of rape and incest. He has stated that women should be able to have an abortion in these circumstances "because it is her body".

=== Age of criminal liability ===
Marcos is opposed to lowering the minimum age of criminal liability to the age of 12, saying that the government should strive for the rehabilitation of juvenile offenders, whom he believes lack discernment as they are "still too young, not fully mature" to be criminally responsible.

=== Capital punishment ===
Marcos does not support reinstating the death penalty for heinous crimes, believing it to be ineffective in curbing crime. In 2016, he had expressed support for the penalty for criminals convicted of drug trafficking.

=== Divorce ===
Marcos is open to legalizing divorce in the country, noting that other countries allow divorce despite being predominantly Catholic, but asserts that divorce should not be an "easy option" for couples.

=== Economy ===
If elected, Marcos plans to prioritize the industrial, agricultural, and tourism sectors to create more jobs. In agriculture, he plans to invest in research, establish programs to assist farmers such as reviving KADIWA stores, and digitalize crop planning and supply chain management. Marcos also plans to prioritize micro, small and medium-sized enterprises (MSMEs). To support small businesses, he plans to impose amnesties, lower taxes, and tax holidays.

=== Education ===
Marcos proposes the establishment of a "national education portal" which will be developed by the government and hasten the education system's digital shift. This proposed online platform aims to allow students and teachers to access digital learning materials and communicate securely. He also plans to seek the support of internet and telecom companies to help digitalize schools.

=== Foreign policy ===
Marcos vows to pursue an independent foreign policy and plans to treat other countries as "friends and hopefully allies." Regarding the territorial disputes in the South China Sea, he will continue President Duterte's non-confrontational stance against China and continue diplomatic talks, emphasizing that the country cannot go to war.

=== Health ===
Marcos' plan to address the COVID-19 pandemic in the Philippines is described in his "Tawid-COVID, Beyond COVID" platform. This includes increasing the budget for healthcare and medical research, strengthening research centers, establishing more public hospitals and specialty hospitals in provinces, and improving the conditions of medical workers by increasing wages and benefits. He also supports boosting vaccinations and the production of vaccines in the country.

=== Infrastructure ===
Marcos plans to expand the current administration's Build! Build! Build! infrastructure program for job creation. In a statement, he vowed to turn the country into a "logistics hub" in Asia by modernizing, expanding, and digitalizing seaports, airports, and railways, citing the country's location in the Pacific Ocean. He also plans to develop renewable energy sources, such as wind and solar, alongside nuclear power. After the onslaught of Typhoon Rai, he stated that he aims to intensify urban planning in the country and the cleanup and development of floodways.

He and his running mate Sara Duterte also pledged to finish the planned improvements of the Duterte administration's nationwide bike lane network to increase public confidence in using bicycles as a preferred mode of transportation. The UniTeam has also mentioned plans to offer zero-interest loans to make bicycles more affordable for Filipinos and roll out similar bike lane networks in other urban centers as part of their vision for a seamless intermodal transportation system in the country.

=== LGBT issues ===
In an interview, Marcos said that LGBT people should not be discriminated upon, stating that all forms of discrimination were corrosive. In a townhall meeting on March 28, 2022, he stated that he will support laws protecting LGBT rights, and also sign a same-sex union bill if it were to be passed by Congress.
