= AER =

AER or Aer may refer to:

== Arts, entertainment and media ==
- Aer (band), an American band
- Aer (album), by Nik Bärtsch's band Mobile, 2003
- American Economic Review, an academic journal
- Aer: Memories of Old, a 2017 video game

== Businesses and organizations ==
=== Companies ===
- AerCap (NYSE stock symbol AER), an Irish aviation leasing company
- Advanced Engine Research, a British auto racing engine manufacturer
- A.E.R. (automobile), a French former car manufacturer
- AER (motorcycles), a British motorcycle manufacturer

=== Organizations ===
- Action For Economic Reforms, a public-interest research organization in the Philippines
- Agri-Energy Roundtable, a non-governmental organization accredited by the United Nations
- Alberta Energy Regulator, a Canadian independent agency
- Australian Energy Regulator, a regulatory authority
- Army Emergency Relief, an American charity
- Assembly of European Regions, an independent network of European Regions
- Atmospheric and Environmental Research, an American scientific research agency owned by Verisk Analytics

== Languages and linguistics ==
- Aer language, an Indo-Aryan language of Pakistan
- Eastern Arrernte language, ISO-639 language code aer
- aer, Lindsay version of possessive and object Spivak pronouns

== Science and technology ==
- Aerides (Aer), an orchid genus
- Apical ectodermal ridge, critical component of vertebrate limb development
- All-electric range, the driving range of an electric vehicle

== Other uses ==
- Aër, a liturgical item in the Eastern Orthodox Church
- Aer (Sendai), a skyscraper in Japan
- Air (classical element) (Greek: aer), in ancient Greek philosophy
- Aeronautics at the Summer Olympics, IOC code AER
- Annual equivalent rate, an interest rate
- Algoma Eastern Railway, a former Canadian railway in Ontario
- Sochi International Airport, in Russia, IATA airport code AER

== See also ==
- Aer Lingus, Irish airline
