= AERs =

AERs may refer to the plural of AER:

- Agranular endoplasmic reticulums, in biology
- All-electric ranges, for electrical vehicles
- Adverse effect risks, or adverse event risks, in medecine

== See also ==
- AERS (disambiguation)
- Aers
