= Supreme Court petitions to nullify Bongbong Marcos' candidacy in the 2022 Philippine presidential election =

2022 Philippine petitions

Buenafe et al v. Comelec et al; Ilagan et al v. Comelec et al
- Court: Supreme Court of the Philippines
- Full case name: Buenafe et al v. Commission on Elections et al; Ilagan et al v. Comelec et al
- Decided: June 28, 2022 (final case)
- Citation: G.R. Nos. 260374, 260426 (consolidated)

Court membership
- Judges sitting: Alexander Gesmundo (Chief Justice), Ramon Paul Hernando, Ricardo Rosario, Midas Marquez, Marvic Mario Victor Leonen, Alfredo Benjamin Caguioa, Amy Lazaro-Javier, Henri Jean Paul Inting, Rodil Zalameda, Mario Lopez, Samuel Gaerlan, Jhosep Lopez, Japar Dimaampao, Antonio Kho Jr., Maria Filomena Singh

Case opinions
- June 28, 2022, case: Gesmundo, C.J., Hernando, Rosario, and Marquez, JJ., concur. Leonen, SAJ., separate concurring opinion. Caguioa, J., on official leave but left his vote; separate opinion. Lazaro-Javier, J., with concurrence. Inting, J., no part. M. Lopez, J., separate concurring opinion. Gaerlan, J., separate concurring opinion. J. Lopez, J., separate concurring opinion. Dimaampao, J., separate concurring opinion. Kho, Jr., J., no part. Singh, J., separate concurring opinion.
- Decision by: Zalameda (June 28, 2022, case)

On May 16 and 17, 2022, respectively, two post-election petitions to deem Bongbong Marcos disqualified and declare void ab initio his certificate of candidacy in the 2022 Philippine presidential election were filed with the Supreme Court of the Philippines.

The first, with G.R. number 260374, was filed on May 16 by petitioners Fr. Christian B. Buenafe, Fides M. Lim, Ma. Edeliza P. Hernandez, Celia Lagman Sevilla, Roland C. Vibal, and Josephine Lascano, represented by their lawyer Ted Te, which named the Philippine Commission on Elections (Comelec), Ferdinand "Bongbong" Romualdez Marcos Jr., and the 18th Congress of the Philippines' Senate (represented by Tito Sotto, then the Senate President) and House of Representatives (represented by Alan Peter Cayetano, then the House's Speaker) as respondents. The second, with G.R. number 260426, was by petitioners made up of martial law-era victims that included activist Bonifacio Ilagan and lawmaker Satur Ocampo, filed on May 18 by the group's lawyers headed by Howard Calleja.

The first petition specifically prayed for the voiding of Marcos' certificate of candidacy because of ineligibility from the start, while the second primarily argued that Marcos was disqualified from the start and must therefore be deemed an invalid candidate; the Court consolidated the two petitions for having the same goal of nullifying Marcos' candidacy through similar arguments.

At the time of the petitions' filing, Bongbong Marcos was already presumed to be the winner of the presidential election held on May 9, per his commanding lead in Comelec's partial, unofficial tally.

== Background ==
=== Petitions filed with and dismissed by Comelec ===
On May 10, the Comelec's en banc, in a vote of 6-0-1, upheld its earlier dismissal of two sets of similar cases—or a total of four appeals or petitions filed as early as November 2021—that sought to bar Marcos from the 2022 presidential race because of his conviction in a 1990s tax case. Rappler opined that the Comelec en banc's May 10 decision did not come as a surprise, but that with the release of these rulings a day after the elections, "the poll body under the leadership of (Saidamen Pangarungan) failed to deliver on its promise to fast-track the resolution of the disqualification saga before the end of April, or before the elections." The poll body announced in November 2021 that no ballots would be printed until the petitions had been decided on. Rappler pointed out that, in comparison, the Comelec cleared its desks early of all anti-Grace Poe petitions during the 2016 Philippine presidential election season, disqualifying the then survey front runner from the presidential race in December 2015, or five months before the May election. (Poe appealed the ruling at the Supreme Court, which reversed in March 2016 the Comelec’s ruling).

According to the website, the poll body’s final decision on the two sets of anti-Marcos petitions did not come as a shock, since five members of the seven-member Comelec en banc already voted in favor of Marcos in at least one of the four anti-Marcos petitions after this said petition was junked at the division level.

The two sets of junked petitions were the following:

- Buenafe et al vs Marcos (petition to cancel certificate of candidacy) – junked by the Comelec, Second Division
- Ilagan et al vs Marcos, Akbayan et al vs Marcos, Mangelen vs Marcos (consolidated disqualification petition) – junked by the Comelec, First Division on Feb. 10

In its dismissal orders, the Comelec en banc said it found "no cogent reason to disturb the (earlier) findings of the commission." One of the resolutions stated that "(a) careful review of the motions for reconsideration reveals that they failed to raise new matters that would warrant the reversal of the assailed resolution."

Comelec chairman Pangarungan and commissioners Socorro Inting, Marlon Casquejo, Aimee Ferolino, Rey Bulay, and Aimee Neri voted to affirm the dismissal of the two cases. These were the first anti-Marcos cases on which Pangarungan was able to cast his vote. Commissioner George Garcia, who was a lawyer for Marcos before he entered the commission, inhibited himself from the case; Inting and Bulay, however, despite petitioners' calls for the two to also inhibit themselves due to alleged bias, did not do so from the en banc review of the Buenafe petition.

On May 11, the Comelec dismissed a fifth similar appeal filed by Danilo Lihaylihay, which was also a petition to declare Marcos a nuisance candidate. This was earlier junked by the Comelec's Second Division, leaving only one more Marcos-disqualification appeal on the en banc's table, filed by Salandanan et al through lawyer Christian Monsod, which had been junked by the Comelec's Second Division.

=== Criticism of Comelec First Division's decision on the consolidated petition ===
In an online press conference on February 11, petitioner Bonifacio Ilagan said the decision on his group's and others' petitions that were consolidated strengthened doubts on the integrity of the poll body's decision-making process, especially in light of then newly-retired Commissioner Rowena Guanzon's revelation that someone did try to influence the decision on those petitions. Guanzon made public her vote for the disqualification of Marcos, for which she cited moral turpitude in Marcos' refusal to pay the taxes, mentioned in the petitions, amounting to ₱23 billion.

According to the Comelec First Division's decision on the consolidated petition, written by Ferolino, "the failure to file tax returns is not inherently wrong in the absence of a law punishing it." Guanzon replied in a Facebook post that "(if) there is no law punishing the non-filing of the ITR [income tax return], how was the RTC (Regional Trial Court) able to convict Marcos Jr. for non-filing of ITR? How was the Court of Appeals able to affirm the RTC conviction? To make matters more confusing, Ferolino in the same breath stated that the 'omission became punishable only through the enactment of the Tax Code'. This contradicts her earlier statement saying there is no law punishing the non-filing of ITR. This is precisely the law which punished the non-filing of ITR, the law which served as the basis of the RTC and the CA for convicting Marcos Jr."

Ilagan's group, the Campaign Against the Return of the Marcoses and Martial Law (CARMMA), also said they "take exception to the First Division's ruling that Marcos Jr.'s sentence to pay fines does not fall under the instances for disqualification, and that his failure to file tax returns is not inherently wrong . . . First, not only did Marcos Jr. consistently fail to file his income tax returns in 1982, 1983, 1984, and 1985 as vice government (sic) and eventually governor of Ilocos Norte, his own camp admitted during the preliminary conference that he did not pay before court the fines which were imposed upon him when he was found guilty of failure (sic) to file his income tax returns." Guanzon herself noted that "such omission . . . has happened four times, and for four consecutive years", revealing, she wrote, "a deliberate intent to violate the law, a conscious design to evade a positive duty, and a wanton disregard of a legal and social duty."

In an op-ed published in the Philippine Daily Inquirer and later in the University of the Philippines College of Law's website, law professor and Action for Economic Reforms fellow Dante Gatmaytan argued that Comelec First Division's decision should be reversed, writing that "The majority opinion allows a person who continuously failed to file income tax returns to run for the highest office of government. It undermines Supreme Court decisions that stress the importance of paying taxes . . ." Gatmaytan wrote that the commissioners were wrong to cite Republic of the Philippines vs. Ferdinand and Imelda Marcos (2009), a case wherein the High Court supposedly ruled that failure to file a tax return is not a crime involving moral turpitude. Gatmaytan quoted Guanzon, who had pointed out that this part of the decision on that case was obiter dictum, that is, defined elsewhere by the Supreme Court as a mere expression of an opinion and with no binding force for purposes of res judicata; it does not embody the determination of the court. That is to say, anything the judge says "is not necessary to the decision of the case before it" is obiter dictum and cannot be regarded as precedent.

=== Comelec en banc's rationale behind its final decision on the two petition sets ===
On the petitions' claim that Marcos should be perpetually disqualified under Presidential Decree No. 1994, which took effect on January 1, 1986, the commission ruled that this accessory penalty cannot be applied to tax violations such as Marcos' when these were committed before the law's effective date. As for Section 12 of the Omnibus Election Code, which provides that a person shall be disqualified to run for public office if they are "sentenced to a penalty of more than eighteen months or for a crime involving moral turpitude", the commission pointed out that, by the final judgment of the Court of Appeals on the case, Marcos was never convicted of a crime involving moral turpitude and sentenced to imprisonment for over three years for such a crime. The commissioners pointed likewise to the case of Republic of the Philippines v. Ferdinand and Imelda Marcos where the High Court supposedly ruled that failure to file a tax return is not a crime involving moral turpitude. The en banc's decision, echoing Marcos' defense, further read that "[Marcos] was no longer a government official before the last day to file the 1985 tax returns [since] the government was overthrown because of the EDSA revolution [and he] was removed from the government. Simply put, Marcos ceased to be a public officer when he and his family were forced to leave the country in February 1986."

==== Marlon Casquejo's separate concurring opinion ====
Although Comelec commissioner Marlon Casquejo agreed with the ruling, he said in his separate concurring opinion that the Comelec "does not hold a general or comprehensive power of review over the decision of the courts" and, therefore, cannot determine whether a judgment of a court of law on a tax-related case is void. "We cannot override a ruling in a tax evasion case by an appellate court; we are not even allowed to pry into why a supposed mandatory accessory penalty is written or not written into such decisions." Casquejo wrote that this aspect of the case "has not been sufficiently addressed" and that it "should have been given due regard so as to quell all legal enquiries that may have arisen because of it." Nonetheless, he concurred with the other commissioners' decision, claiming that the petitioners' declaration was "a mere theory propounded" by them, adding that "any action to challenge [Marcos' candidacy] must be done through the correct remedy and filed before the appropriate tribunal."

== Supreme Court petitions' contents ==
Like most of the earlier petitions filed with the Comelec, the two petitions filed with the Supreme Court reiterated that Marcos lied when he stated that he had never been convicted of any crime, asserting that Marcos was convicted of tax evasion in 1995 after he repeatedly failed to file his income tax returns when he was vice governor and later governor of Ilocos Norte in the 1980s. The petitions argued that this conviction should already have barred Marcos from seeking any public office according to the law. Before Marcos' filing of candidacy for president in 2021 and after the said conviction in 1995, he was Governor of Ilocos Norte for a second time from 1998 to 2007, a congressman representing Ilocos Norte's 2nd district from 2007 to 2010, and a Philippine senator from 2010 to 2016. The petitions also echoed most of the earlier petitions' assertion that Marcos was guilty of moral turpitude and was convicted of a crime that carried with it a jail sentence of over 18 months, both of which facts were already grounds for disqualification under the election code.

Marcos' tax evasion conviction that the petitions were referring to was from a Quezon City Regional Trial Court Branch 105 decision that found Marcos guilty of breaching Sections 45 and 50 of the National Internal Revenue Code. Marcos was sentenced to at least nine years of imprisonment and to pay a fine for his failure to file his Income Tax Returns as well as pay his taxes for the years 1982, 1983, 1984 and 1985. A later certification from the trial court said Marcos still "has not satisfied" the judgment.

Essentially, the petitioners were asking the Court to cancel and void Marcos' certificate of candidacy, on the basis that he lied when he said he had not committed any crimes, and then to issue a restraining order against Congress from counting the votes until a decision on the matter was made.

Both petitions also wanted the Supreme Court to declare outgoing Vice President Leni Robredo as the winner, having supposedly obtained the highest number of valid votes.

=== Marcos's defense ===
At the Supreme Court, Marcos' lawyers argued anew that the failure to file an income tax return is not a crime involving moral turpitude. They also reiterated the argument that the National Internal Revenue Code rule imposing perpetual disqualification on government officials found guilty of violating the Tax Code cannot be deemed retroactive; Marcos' camp said that he, therefore, could not have misrepresented (or lied about) something that legal experts were still debating on. Additionally, as the 1997 Court of Appeals ruling removed the jail term on Marcos' conviction while affirming the conviction, Marcos' camp argued that there was therefore nothing in that 1997 CA ruling that imposed a jail term.

== Supreme Court's decision ==
On June 28, 2022, the High Court voted 13-0 in favor of Comelec, Marcos, et al, clearing the way for Marcos' scheduled inauguration on June 30 as the 17th President of the Republic of the Philippines. Justice Antonio Kho Jr. did not participate in the decision, being a member of the Commission on Elections when the cases were first decided on at the division level, while Justice Henri Jean Paul Inting inhibited himself, incumbent Comelec Commissioner Socorro Inting being his sister. Justice Rodil Zalameda wrote the decision.

Among other points, the Supreme Court, faced with the 1997 Court of Appeals ruling affirming Marcos’ conviction for his non-filing of income tax returns from 1982 until 1985, sustained the Comelec's ruling on the non-filing of income tax returns as not amounting to moral turpitude.

The complete transcript of the Court's decision, along with some of the Justices' separate concurring opinions, were later posted on elibrary.judiciary.gov.ph as well as on lawphil.net.

== See also ==
- Petitions by Rio, et al, for an investigation of the 2022 Philippine presidential election results
