= University of the Philippines Los Baños College of Economics and Management =

Coordinates: 14°10′01.34″N 121°14′29.52″E

College of Economics and Management at University of the Philippines Los Baños
- Kolehiyo ng Ekonomika at Pangangasiwa
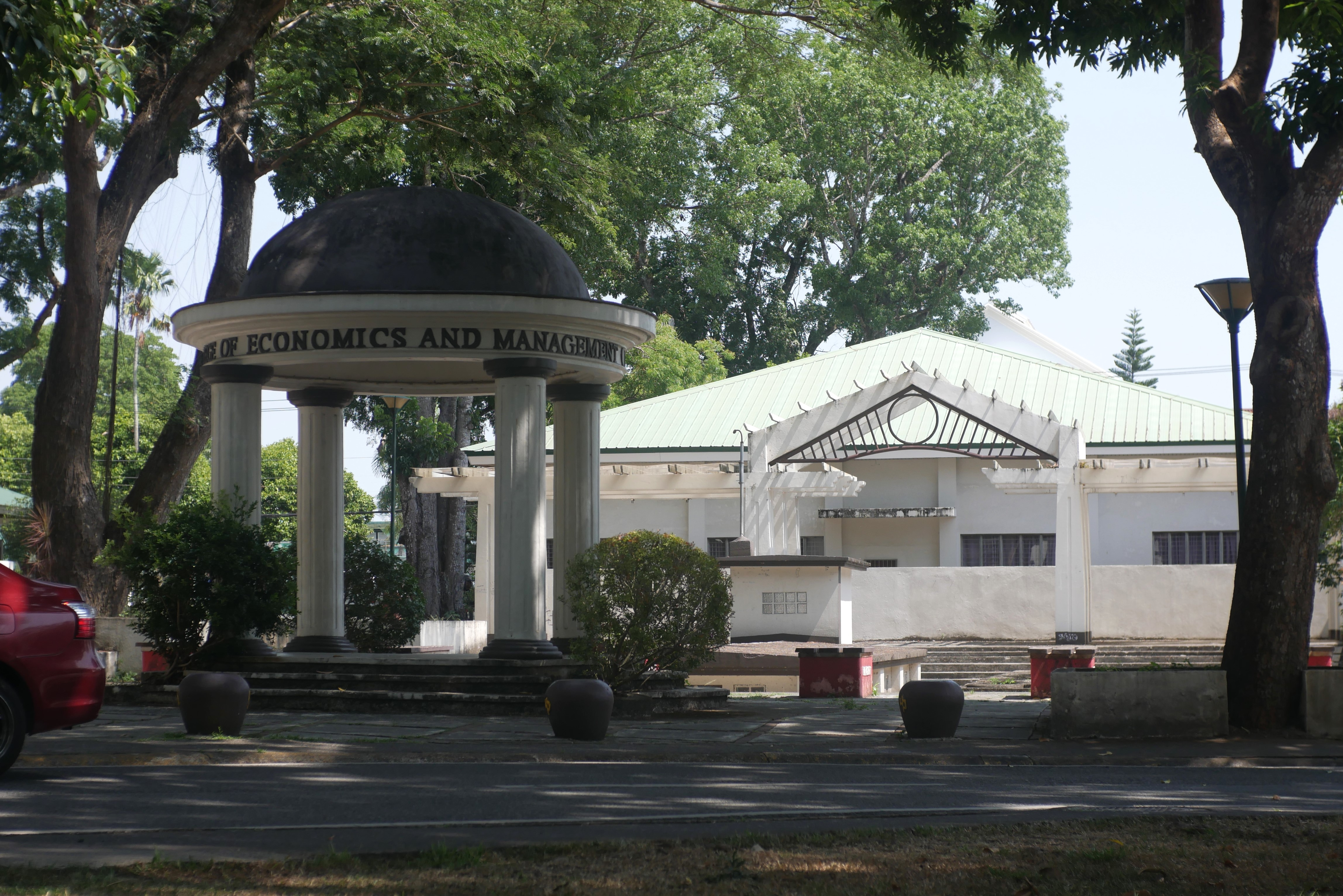
- College of Economics and Management complex with the Monopteros
- Type: College
- Established: 1975
- Dean: Dr. Ma. Angeles O. Catelo
- Students: 1,485 (Second Semester · 2025-2026)
- Location: (Philippines) Los Baños, Laguna, Philippines
- Website: www.cem.uplb.edu.ph

The College of Economics and Management (CEM) is one of the eleven degree-granting units of the University of the Philippines Los Baños. It is the first in Asia to offer degree programs in Agricultural Economics and has trained agricultural, resource and environmental economists from all over the continent.

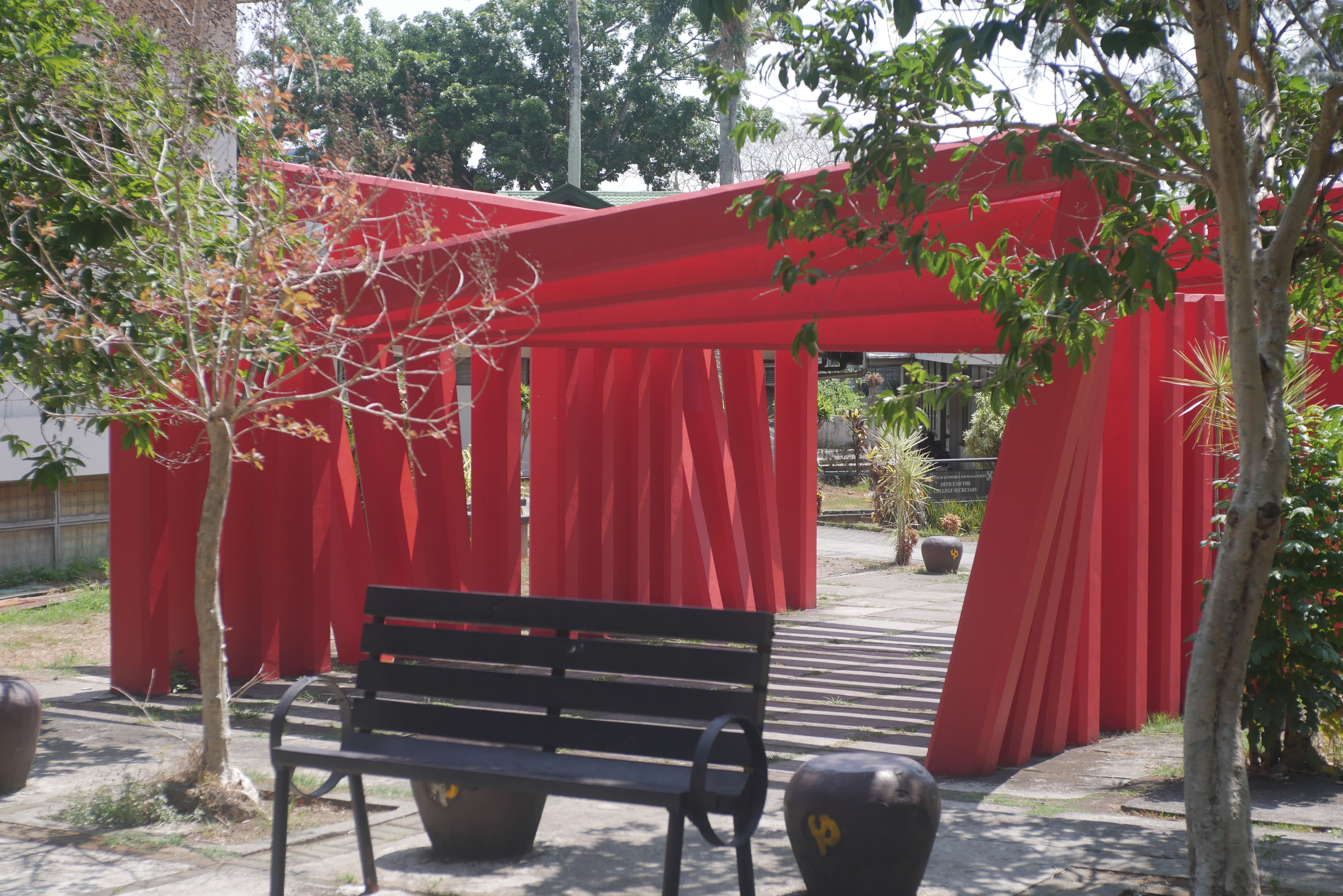
The architectural pavilion of the College of Economics and Management, known as the Staples.

CEM is composed of four departments - the Department of Agricultural Economics, Department of Economics, Department of Agribusiness Management and Entrepreneurship, and the Institute of Cooperatives and Bio-Enterprise Development (ICOPED). Also affiliated with the college is the Agribusiness Center for Entrepreneurs and the Asia-Pacific Economic Cooperation Center for Technology Exchange and Training for Small and Medium Enterprises (ACTETSME).

== History ==
The College traces its roots from the Institute of Agricultural Development and Administration under the College of Agriculture in 1975 with three Departments - Agricultural Economics, Economics, and Management. It later became the College of Development Economics and Management which merged IADA with the Agricultural Credit and Cooperative Studies and the Agrarian Reform Institute in 1978.

== Department of Agribusiness Management and Entrepreneurship (DAME) ==
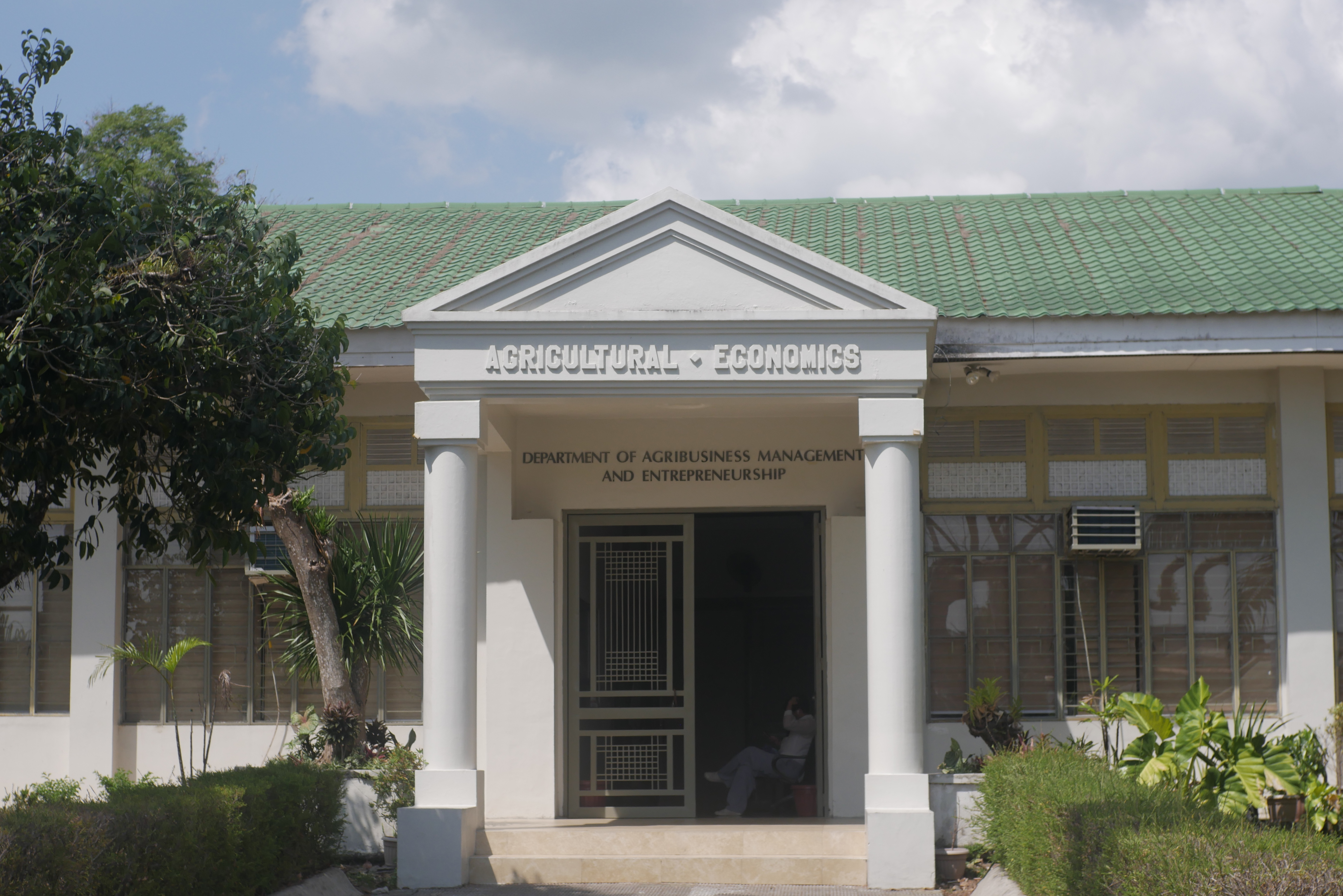
Façade of the College of Economics and Management – Department of Agribusiness Management and Entrepreneurship building

The first undergraduate program in Agribusiness was established at the UP College of Agriculture in Los Baños, Philippines as Bachelor of Science in Agriculture major in Agribusiness in 1966. The program was initially a joint undertaking with the UP College of Business Administration in Diliman, Quezon City until 1975. In 1969, a seminar titled "Advanced Agribusiness Management" was held in Manila which led to Jose D. Drilon publishing the book "Agribusiness Management Resource Materials," the foundation of current agribusiness programs around the world.

Drilon further expanded the concept of agribusiness to include coordinators for agribusiness structure and policy such as governments and research institutions in his 1971 book. Goldberg meanwhile added other coordinators such as schools, financial institutions, and cooperatives. D.K. Desai (1973) attempted to integrate all the entities and sectors within agribusiness and called it the Agribusiness System.

In 1975, the newly created Institute of Agricultural Development and Administration (now CEM) assumed sole administration of the program. The program was officially recognized as B.S. in Agricultural Business in 1978. In June 1983, the program was renamed B.S. in Agribusiness Management then in 2017 B.S. in Agribusiness Management and Entrepreneurship.

== Department of Agricultural and Applied Economics (DAAE) ==
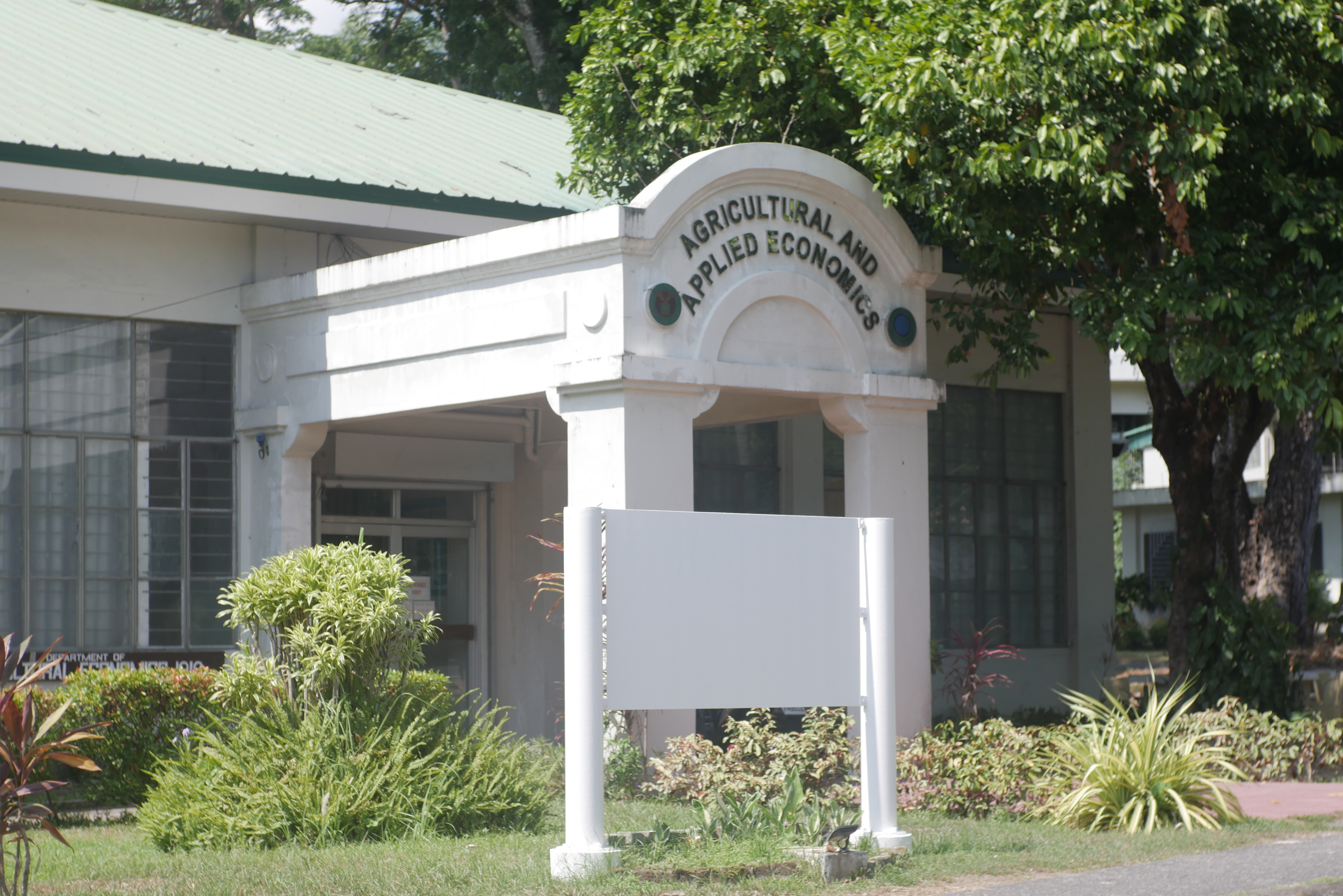
Façade of Francisco M. Sacay Hall, formerly the Department of Agricultural Economics building, now housing the Department of Agricultural and Applied Economics

The field of agricultural economics in the Philippines developed alongside the expansion of agricultural education during the American colonial period. In 1919, the University of the Philippines College of Agriculture established the Department of Rural Economics (DRE), regarded in institutional histories as among the earliest formal agricultural economics units in Asia.

The department was renamed the Department of Agricultural Economics in 1936 and later became the Department of Agricultural and Applied Economics (DAAE) in 2015, to open the broader application of economic analysis to agriculture, rural development, natural resources, environmental issues, and public policy. Within the University of the Philippines Los Baños, agricultural economics became one of the foundational disciplines of the College of Economics and Management.

The discipline contributed to the development of related academic fields in agribusiness management, cooperative management, and economics, as well as graduate instruction, research, and extension programs focused on agricultural and rural development. Over time, the expansion of the field corresponded with broader trends in quantitative analysis, interdisciplinary research, and international collaboration in agricultural and applied economics.

== Department of Economics (DE) ==
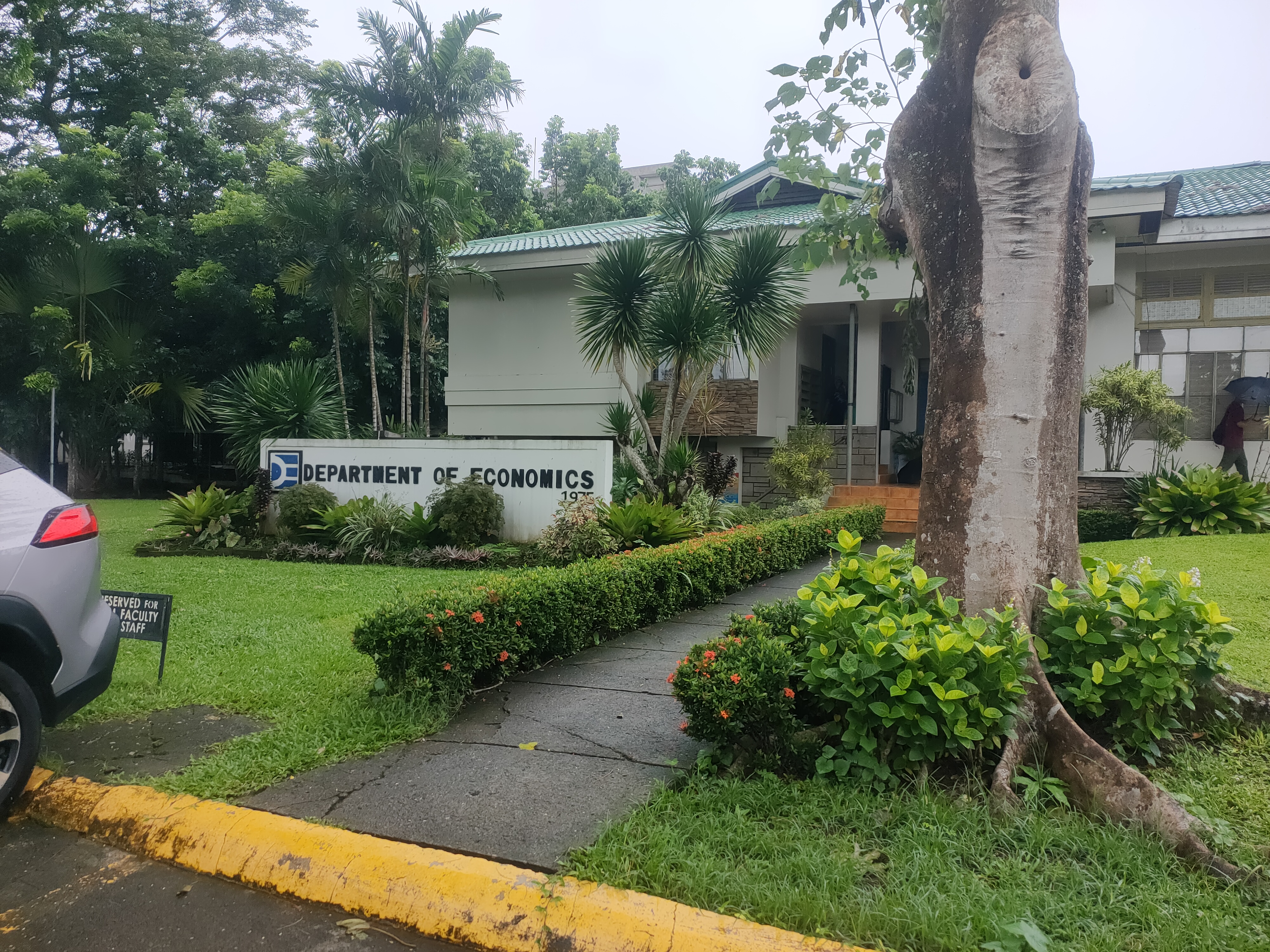
The façade of the Department of Economics - College of Economics and Management

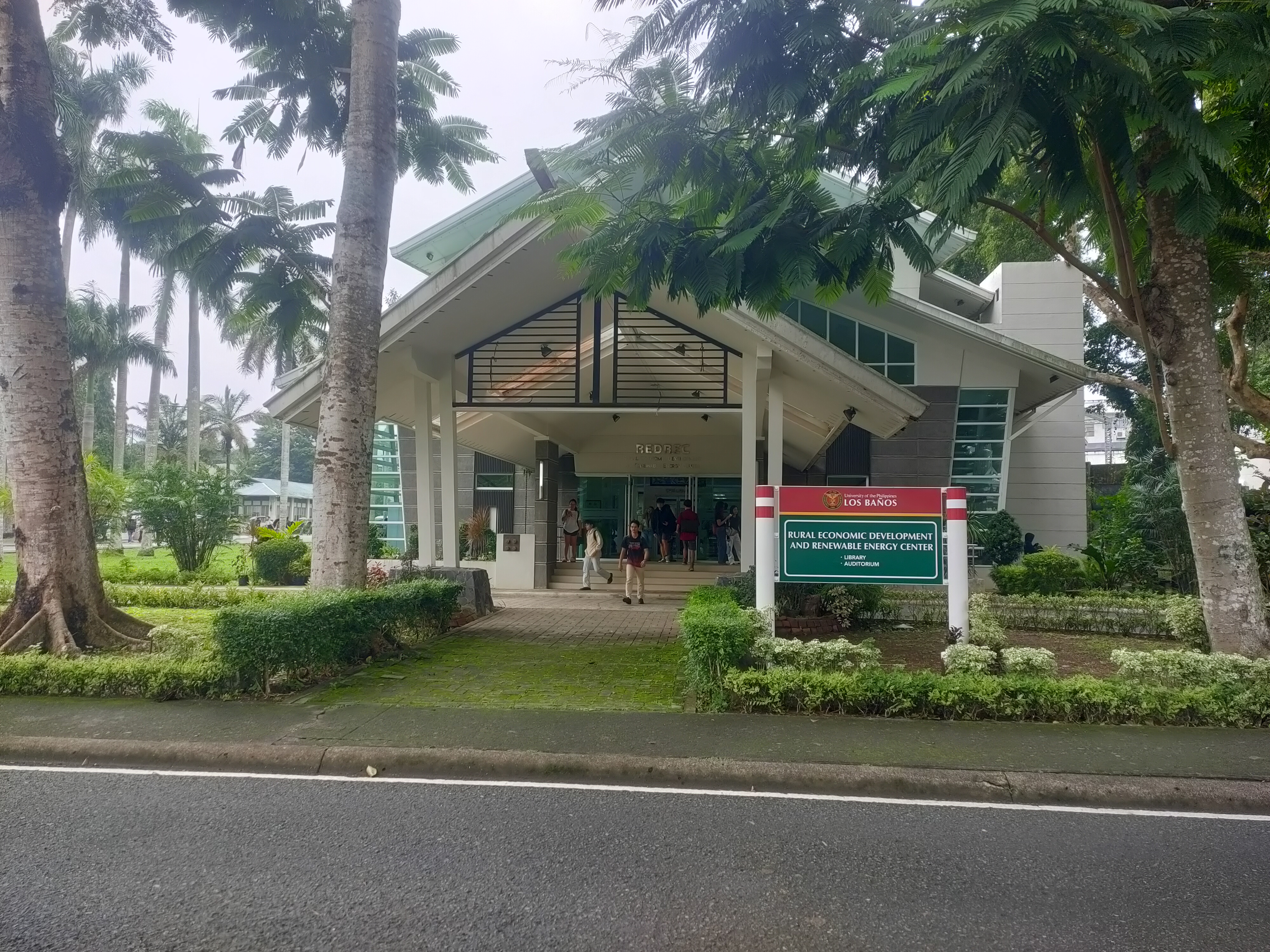
The Rural Economic Development and Renewable Energy Center a facility housing the CEM Library and an auditorium, primarily used for lectures and other academic activities.

The Bachelor of Science in Economics (BS Economics) program of the University of the Philippines Los Baños (UPLB) is a four-year undergraduate degree under the College of Economics and Management. It requires 135 academic units and includes general education courses, core economics courses, specialization courses, and research requirements such as a seminar and thesis.

The history of the UPLB Department of Economics is closely tied to the institution of the College of Economics and Management. In 1975, the Institute of Agricultural Development and Administration, or IADA, was established with three academic units: the Department of Agricultural Economics (DAE), the Department of Agribusiness Management (DAM), and the Department of Economics (DE).

Three years later, IADA became part of the newly established College of Development Economics and Management, which would eventually become today’s College of Economics and Management.

During its early years, DE primarily served students from the other degree programs of the UPLB. It offered foundational economics courses that helped future scientists, agricultural economists & managers, among others, understand the wider economic forces shaping their respective fields. Although it began as a service unit, the Department gradually developed its own academic identity and a broader vision for economics education at UPLB.

A major turning point came in 1986, when the University instituted the Bachelor of Science in Economics program. Its establishment came at a defining moment in Philippine history, as the country emerged from the Martial Law period and confronted the difficult task of economic and democratic reconstruction. The program reflected the need for economists who could understand not only markets and quantitative models, but also the institutions, policies, and social conditions that can shape national development.

The curriculum begins with introductory and intermediate courses in economics, mathematics, and statistics. Early subjects include General Economics (ECON 11), Intermediate Microeconomics (ECON 102), Intermediate Macroeconomics (ECON 101), Statistical Methods (STAT 101), and Mathematical Economics (ECON 130). General education courses include subjects in communication, history, arts, science, ethics, and physical education. In higher years, students take more advanced and applied economics subjects such as Introduction to Econometrics (ECON 137), Intermediate Econometrics (ECON 138), Growth Theory and Open Economy Macroeconomics (ECON 103), Factor Market Analysis and Welfare Economics (ECON 104), Money and Banking (ECON 121), International Economics (ECON 141), Public Economics (ECON 151), Philippine Economic History (ECON 115), and Benefit Cost Analysis (ECON 175). Students are also required to complete an undergraduate seminar (ECON 199) and undergraduate thesis (ECON 200).

Students select one specialization: Development Economics or Environmental Economics. Development Economics focuses on economic growth, poverty, inequality, and development policy. Environmental Economics focuses on environmental issues, natural resources, and related economic analysis. Both tracks include elective courses in specialized areas of economics.

The BS Economics program received certification from the ASEAN University Network-Quality Assurance, following its program assessment in November 2022. It became the first BS Economics program in the UP System to receive AUN-QA certification and, at the time, the first and only degree program in the College of Economics and Management to hold the distinction. The certification affirmed the quality of the program’s curriculum, teaching and learning processes, academic support, and commitment to continuous improvement..

== Faculty (selected) ==
Department of Economics

Former Faculty/Retired

- Amelia Bello (MA University of Hawaii)
- Gideon Carnaje (PhD UP Diliman)
- Achilles Costales (PhD UPLB)
- Cielito Habito (PhD Harvard)
- Herminia Francisco (PhD UPLB)
- Tirso Paris (PhD Michigan State University)
- Yolanda Garcia (PhD UPLB)

Active

- Emmanuel Genesis Andal (PhD University of Reading)
- Jaimie Kim Arias (PhD Ateneo De Manila University)
- Jefferson Arapoc (PhD University of Newcastle, Australia)
- Jose DV. Camacho (PhD Kyoto University)
- Ma. Angeles Catelo (PhD Nagoya University)
- Agham Cuevas (PhD UP Diliman)
- Ma. Laarni Revilla (PhD National Graduate Institute for Policy Studies)
- U-Primo Rodriguez (MA Australian National University)
- Asa Jose Sajise (PhD University of California, Berkeley)
- Ma. Luisa Valera (Post Doc National University of Singapore)

Department of Agricultural and Applied Economics

Former Faculty/Retired

- Corazon Aragon (PhD University of Hawaii)
- Joseph V. Balagtas (PhD Purdue)
- Salvador Catelo (PhD Kyoto University)
- Julieta A. Delos Reyes (MS UPLB)
- Prudenciano Gordoncillo (PhD Victoria University of Technology)
- Ma. Eden Piadozo (PhD Tokyo University of Agriculture)
- Cesar Quicoy (PhD UPLB)
- Roberto Rañola, Jr. (PhD University of Minnesota)
- Corazon Rapera (PhD Virginia Tech)
- Jose Yorobe (PhD UPLB)
- Romeo Huelgas (MA UP Diliman)
- Leodegario Ilag (PhD Purdue)
- Flordeliza Lantican (PhD Colorado State University)
- Cezar Brian Mamaril (PhD Virginia Tech)
- Alessando Manilay (MS Kansas State University)
- Paciencia Manuel (PhD University of Idaho)
- Camilo Opeña (PhD Ohio State University)
- Isabelita Pabuayon (PhD Kansas State University)
- Marilyn M. Elauria (MS Purdue)

Active

- Antonio Jesus Quilloy (PhD UPLB)
- Bates Bathan (PhD Kasetsart University)
- Ruby Jane Estadilla (MS National Graduate Institute for Policy Studies, Tokyo, Japan)
- Reymond Denver Buenaseda (MS Kasetsart University)
- Arvin Vista (PhD Oregon State University)

Department of Agribusiness Management and Entreprenuership

Former Faculty/Retired

- Agnes Banzon (PhD Monash University)
- Reynaldo Tan (PhD University of Tsukuba)

Active

- Arlene Gutierrez (MBA Asian Institute of Management)
- Dinah Pura T. Depositario (DBA De La Salle University Manila)

== Degree programs ==
- BS Agribusiness Management and Entrepreneurship Majors: Agribusiness Entrepreneurship, Agribusiness Management
- BS Agricultural and Applied Economics
  Majors: Production Economics and Farm Management, Agricultural Marketing and Price Analysis, Rural Finance and Cooperatives, Food and Nutrition Economics, and Natural Resource Economics
- BS Economics
  Majors: Development Economics, Environmental Economics
- MS Economics
  Majors: Economics of Development, Quantitative Economics
- Master of Management
  Majors: Agribusiness Management, Business Management
- PhD Agricultural Economics
  Majors: Production Economics and Farm Management, Marketing and Price Analysis, Policy and Development, Natural Resource Economics, Agricultural Finance and Cooperatives

== Notable people ==
- Jikun Huang (PhD) - Director, Center for Chinese Agricultural Policy
- Linxiu Zhang (PhD) - Director, Stanford Rural Education Action Project and Deputy Director, Center for Chinese Agricultural Policy
- William Meyers (MS) - Professor, University of Missouri and director, Food and Agricultural Policy Research Institute
- Maria (Sergy) Floro (Former faculty) - Professor at American University
- PA Samaratunga (PhD) - Head (Agricultural Economics), Sri Lanka Institute of Policy Studies
- Jonna P. Estudillo (BS, MS) - Professor, Graduate Research Institute of Policy Studies (Japan)
- Joseph Salvacruz (BS) - Professor at Hong Kong University of Science and Technology Business School
- Cielito Habito (BS/Faculty) - Former Secretary of Socio-Economic Planning and Director General of National Economic and Development Authority
- Arsenio Balisacan (MS) - Current secretary of Socio-Economic Planning and Director General of National Economic and Development Authority; Dean of UP School of Economics in Diliman
- Migz Zubiri (BS) - Senator, 14th (2007–2010), 15th (2010–2011) and 17th Congress of the Philippines (2016–present)
- Carlito Añonuevo (Former faculty) - former president of Action For Economic Reforms
- Keb Cuevas (BS) - Environmentalist and former Rappler journalist
- Manuel Candelaria Bautista (BS Economics – did not graduate) – Filipino student leader, campus journalist, and activist at the University of the Philippines College of Agriculture (now UP Los Baños); former student council representative and underground press organizer during the Marcos dictatorship
- Isidro Ungab (BS) - Member of the Philippine House of Representatives, Davao City 3rd District (2007–2016, 2019–present); former Deputy Speaker of the House of Representatives (2020–2022, 2022–2023); former Davao City councilor (1995–2004)
- Jerrold Tarog (BS Agribusiness Management - did not complete) - Filipino film director, screenwriter, producer, editor, and composer; known for Heneral Luna (2015), Goyo: Ang Batang Heneral (2018), and Bliss (2017)
- Maria Valentina Plaza (BS) - Former Governor of Agusan del Sur (2007–2010) and Member of the House of Representatives for Agusan del Sur’s 1st District (2010–2019); Filipino politician from a prominent political family in Agusan del Sur
- Jose V. Camacho Jr. (BS) - Chancellor of the University of the Philippines Los Baños
