= Magsaysay, Davao del Sur =

Municipality in Davao del Sur, Philippines

Magsaysay
- Municipality
- Municipality of Magsaysay
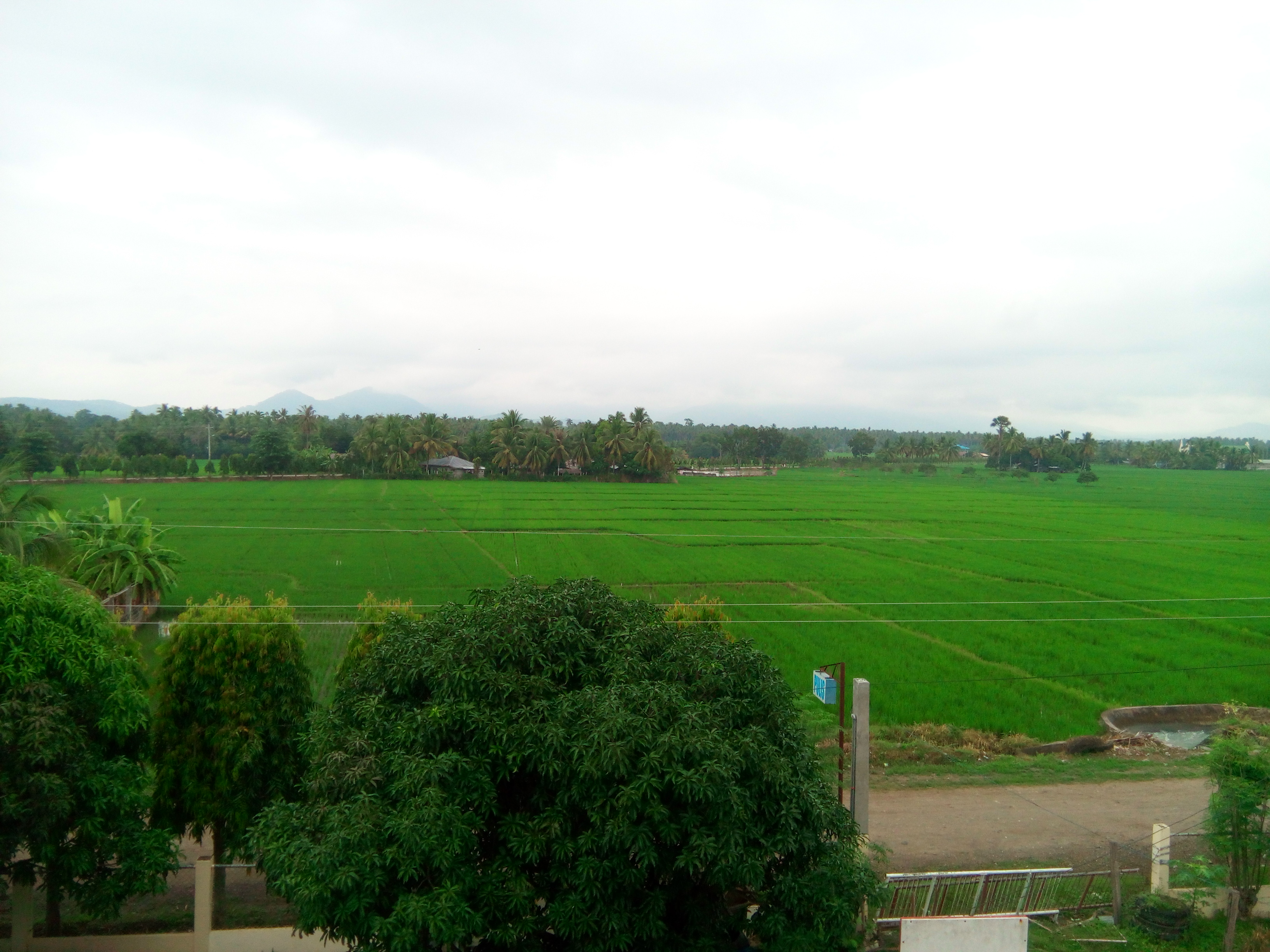
- Rice granary

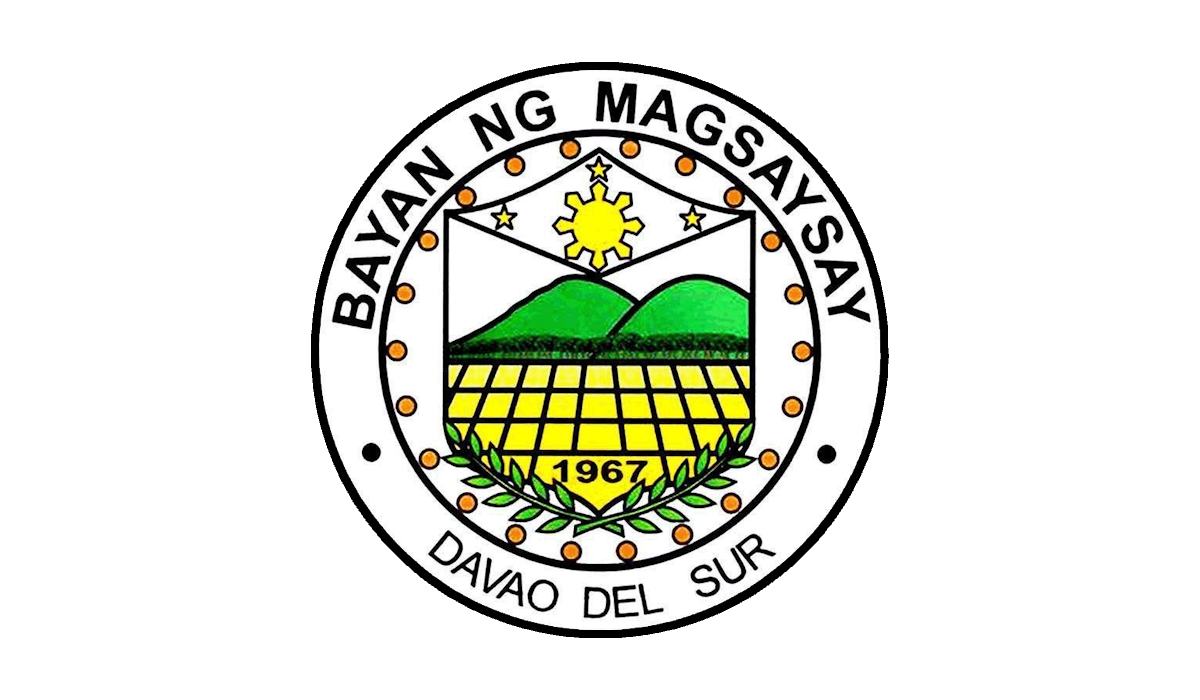
- Flag Seal

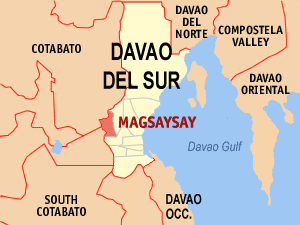
- Map of Davao del Sur with Magsaysay highlighted
- Interactive map of Magsaysay
- Location within the Philippines
- Coordinates: 6°45′09″N 125°09′03″E
- Country: Philippines
- Region: Davao Region
- Province: Davao del Sur
- District: Lone district
- Founded: June 17, 1967
- Named for: Ramon Magsaysay
- Barangays: 22 (see Barangays)

Government
  - Type: Sangguniang Bayan
  - Mayor: Engr. Arthur Dedace Davin, C.E.
  - Vice Mayor: Ronie Lagmay Sarande
  - Representative: John Tracy Fortich Cagas
  - Municipal Council: Members: Roberto B. Ambayan; Douglas D. Corpuz; Enrique V. Evangelista; Condrado M. Bismanos Jr.; Ferdinand P. Estremos; Cornelio R. Bajenting; Allan P. Carampatana; Necodemo T. Saraum, Jr.
  - Electorate: 40,313 voters (2025)

Area
  - Total: 268.09 km^{2} (103.51 sq mi)
- Elevation: 723 m (2,372 ft)
- Highest elevation: 1,322 m (4,337 ft)
- Lowest elevation: 418 m (1,371 ft)

Population (2024 census)
  - Total: 57,936
  - Density: 216.11/km^{2} (559.71/sq mi)
  - Households: 15,398

Economy
  - Income class: 1st municipal income class
  - Poverty incidence: 17.76% (2023)
  - Revenue: ₱ 267 million (2024)
  - Assets: ₱ 1,186 million (2024)
  - Expenditure: ₱ 313.7 million (2024)
  - Liabilities: ₱ 280.8 million (2024)

Service provider
  - Electricity: Davao del Sur Electric Cooperative (DASURECO)
- Time zone: UTC+8 (PST)
- ZIP code: 8004
- PSGC: 1102407000
- IDD : area code: +63 (0)82
- Native languages: Davawenyo; Cebuano; Kalagan; Tagalog; Ata Manobo

Magsaysay, officially the Municipality of Magsaysay (Cebuano: Lungsod sa Magsaysay; Tagalog: Bayan ng Magsaysay), is a municipality in the province of Davao del Sur, Philippines. According to the 2024 census, it has a population of 57,936 people.

As with much of the rural areas of Davao del Sur, the predominant economic activity is based on rice farming.

== History ==
The whole area under jurisdiction of the municipality of Magsaysay were all once part of Bansalan. It was populated firstly by Blaan and Bagobo until settlers from the Visayas came to the area and eventually became the dominant ethnicity of the area. The most populous village in the area was Kialeg, now the town center, which was renamed Magsaysay in 1959 in honor of the late president Ramon Magsaysay.

The municipality of Magsaysay was created from 18 barangays of Bansalan on June 17, 1967 signed by President Ferdinand Marcos. Barangay Magsaysay, formerly and still colloquially known in the present as Kialeg, became the town center of the newly created municipality and was thus was officially renamed Barangay Poblacion.

A magnitude 6.3 earthquake struck at Magsaysay on February 7, 2021, resulting in some damage to property to the nearby towns and cities.

== Geography ==
=== Barangays ===
Magsaysay is politically subdivided into 22 barangays. Each barangay consists of puroks while some have sitios.

- Bacungan
- Balnate
- Barayong
- Blocon
- Dalawinon
- Dalumay
- Glamang
- Kanapulo
- Kasuga
- Lower Bala
- Mabini
- Malawanit
- Malongon
- New Ilocos
- Poblacion (Kialeg)
- San Isidro
- San Miguel
- Tacul
- Tagaytay
- Upper Bala
- Maibo
- New Opon

=== Climate ===
Climate data for Magsaysay, Davao del Sur
| Month | Jan | Feb | Mar | Apr | May | Jun | Jul | Aug | Sep | Oct | Nov | Dec | Year |
|---|---|---|---|---|---|---|---|---|---|---|---|---|---|
| Mean daily maximum °C (°F) | 30 (86) | 30 (86) | 31 (88) | 31 (88) | 30 (86) | 29 (84) | 29 (84) | 29 (84) | 30 (86) | 30 (86) | 30 (86) | 30 (86) | 30 (86) |
| Mean daily minimum °C (°F) | 22 (72) | 22 (72) | 22 (72) | 23 (73) | 24 (75) | 23 (73) | 23 (73) | 23 (73) | 23 (73) | 23 (73) | 23 (73) | 23 (73) | 23 (73) |
| Average precipitation mm (inches) | 59 (2.3) | 46 (1.8) | 41 (1.6) | 54 (2.1) | 105 (4.1) | 159 (6.3) | 179 (7.0) | 197 (7.8) | 162 (6.4) | 147 (5.8) | 102 (4.0) | 65 (2.6) | 1,316 (51.8) |
| Average rainy days | 12.3 | 11.7 | 12.2 | 14.5 | 22.6 | 25.6 | 26.6 | 27.5 | 25.5 | 26.0 | 21.2 | 16.0 | 241.7 |
Source: Meteoblue

== Demographics ==
Population census of Magsaysay
| Year | Pop. | ±% p.a. |
|---|---|---|
| 1970 | 30,920 | — |
| 1975 | 28,531 | −1.60% |
| 1980 | 31,538 | +2.02% |
| 1990 | 38,531 | +2.02% |
| 1995 | 41,979 | +1.62% |
| 2000 | 43,172 | +0.60% |
| 2007 | 45,005 | +0.58% |
| 2010 | 49,141 | +3.25% |
| 2015 | 53,876 | +1.77% |
| 2020 | 56,263 | +0.92% |
| 2024 | 57,936 | +0.71% |
Source: Philippine Statistics Authority

== Economy ==
Poverty incidence of Magsaysay (%)

Source: Philippine Statistics Authority

== Media ==
- Kastigador Balita Mindanao (Weekly Newspaper)
- 95.3 MHz DXET Radyo Kastigo Magsaysay
