= Aers =

Aers is a surname. Notable people with the surname include:

- David Aers (born 1946) American professor of English, historical theology and religion
- Ian Aers (1921–1995), British-Swazi politician

== See also ==
- AERS (disambiguation)
