= Aer (Sendai) =

Skyscraper in Sendai, Japan

Coordinates: 38°15′45″N 140°52′53″E

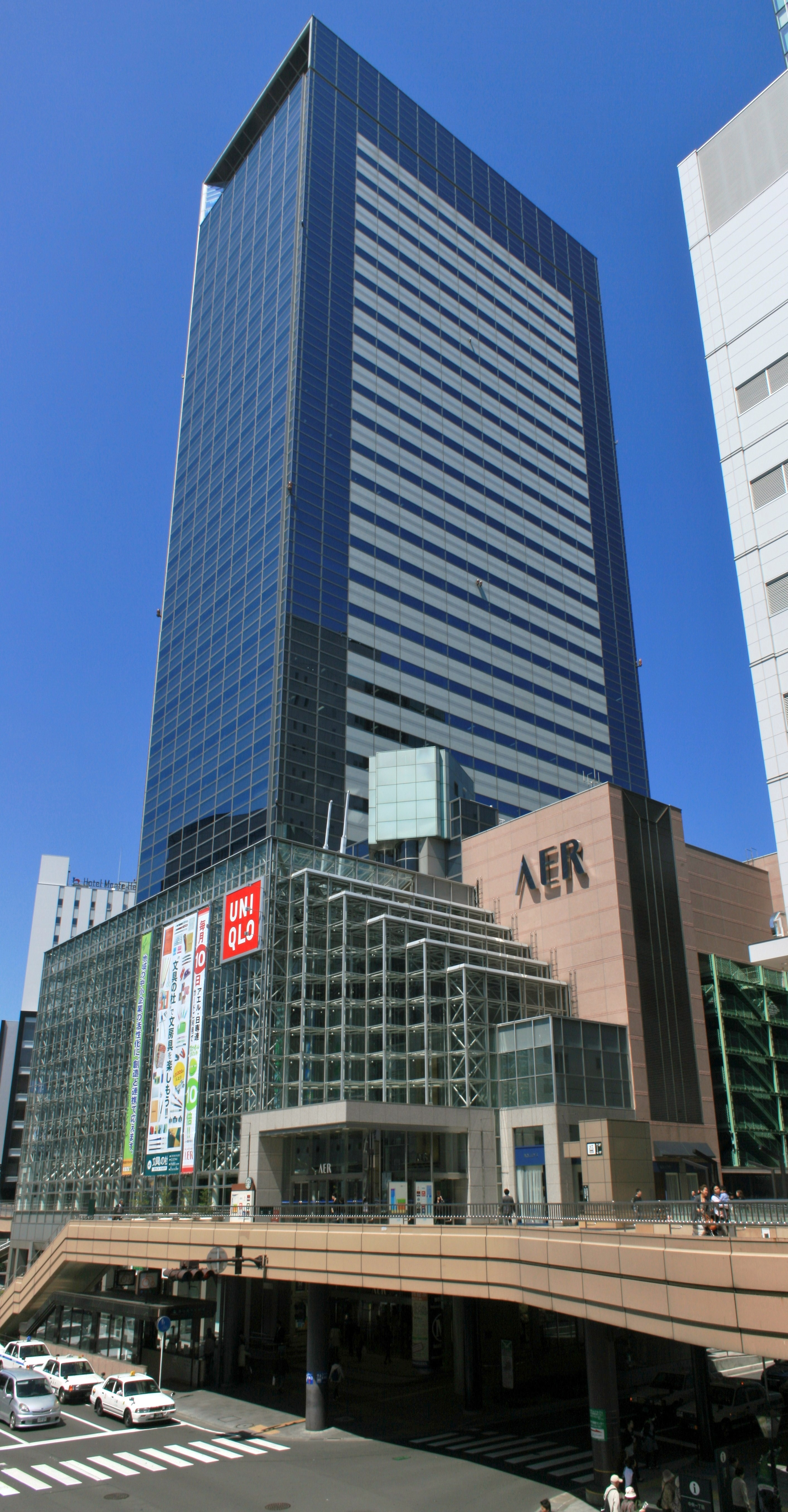
Aer skyscraper in Sendai, Japan

Aer (アエル, aeru) is a skyscraper in Sendai, Miyagi Prefecture, Japan. Rising 31 stories to a height of 145.5 m, Aer was the tallest building in the Tōhoku region until 2010 and the completion of the Sendai Trust Tower (37 stories/180 m) and was partially constructed by robots.

== Overview ==
Aer is a mixed used complex built as a part of the redevelopment of the west side of Sendai Station. Floors 1 to 4 are occupied by retail businesses, including chains such as Uniqlo and Maruzen. Floors 5, 6, and 7 are occupied by municipal government offices, while floors 8 through 30 are occupied by commercial offices. Located on the 31st floor are a free observation deck, and an ATTivo gym. A unique feature of this building is that it was partially constructed by robots.

The top floor was assembled with a lattice of overhead rails. It was jacked up and the first floor was then constructed. This process was repeated until the building stood at its full height. Robots welded, located columns and beams, poured and leveled concrete. The postal codes 980-61xx are reserved for this building, with xx indicating the floor of the building. Postal codes of 32 and higher are available to specific clients.

As the tallest building in the Tōhoku region, Aer drew people's attention even since the beginning of its construction. The building is unrelated to the consumer finance company AEL, which is pronounced the same as Aer in Japanese.

Building address: 1-3-1 Chūō, Aoba-ku, Sendai, Miyagi, Japan.
