= Aimee Ferolino =

Filipino lawyer and election official

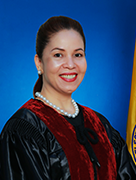
- Official portrait of Ferolino as a COMELEC commissioner

Commissioner of the Commission on Elections
- Incumbent
- Assumed office November 24, 2020
- Appointed by: Rodrigo Duterte
- Preceded by: Al Parreño

Personal details
- Born: Aimee Pecson Ferolino Magsaysay, Davao del Sur, Philippines
- Education: Rizal Memorial College; Cor Jesu College of Digos
- Occupation: Lawyer, Election Official

Aimee Pecson Ferolino-Ampoloquio is a Filipino lawyer and election official serving as a Commissioner of the Commission on Elections (COMELEC) since November 24, 2020. She was appointed by then-President Rodrigo Duterte to succeed Al Parreño. Before her appointment as a commissioner, Ferolino held various positions within COMELEC, particularly in the Davao Region.

== Early life and education ==
Ferolino was born in Magsaysay, Davao del Sur, Philippines. She earned a Bachelor of Science in Psychology from Rizal Memorial College in 1993. In 2006, she obtained her Juris Doctor degree from Cor Jesu College of Digos. Continuing her legal education, she pursued a Master of Laws, completing nine units from San Beda University in consortium with Cor Jesu College between 2017 and 2018.

== Career ==
Ferolino began her career in COMELEC as an Emergency Laborer in Magsaysay, Davao del Sur, serving from December 8, 1994, to April 23, 1996. She was then promoted to Election Assistant II and later acted as Election Officer III in Magsaysay, Davao del Sur, and Matanao, Davao del Sur, from April 24, 1996, to September 3, 2007. From September 4, 2007, to August 2, 2018, she served as election Officer IV in Digos City, the First District of Davao City, and the Second District of Davao City, where she managed local electoral processes and voter registration initiatives. In August 2018, she was appointed as the Provincial Election Supervisor for Davao del Norte and Compostela Valley Province (now Davao de Oro), a position she held until November 23, 2020.

Apart from her electoral work, Ferolino also served as a College of Law Professor from 2007-2008.

=== 2013 election incident ===
In 2013, while serving as the election officer for Davao City's first district, Ferolino (then known as Aimee Ampoloquio) became embroiled in controversy after making remarks about teachers serving as Board of Election Inspectors (BEIs). Amid issues with the Precinct Count Optical Scan (PCOS) machines, she publicly described some teachers as "either forgetful or plain stupid" due to difficulties in transmitting election returns. The comment, made out of frustration over persistent technical failures, sparked widespread condemnation from educators, who demanded a public apology for what they deemed an insult to their integrity and professionalism.

In response to the backlash, a meeting between COMELEC and the Department of Education was convened, where her superior, COMELEC-XI Director Wilfred Jay Balisado, formally apologized on her behalf, recognizing that the statement was inappropriate and offensive to teachers.

Additionally, during the same election period, Ferolino suffered a health emergency. While questioning teachers about transmission failures, she experienced a sudden spike in blood pressure, leading to the temporary suspension of the canvassing process in Davao City.

=== COMELEC Commissioner ===
Ferolino's extensive experience in election administration led to her appointment as COMELEC Commissioner. Her nomination was announced by then COMELEC Chairman Sheriff Abas, who highlighted her vast experience in frontline election service.

Although Ferolino was appointed by President Duterte in November 2020, her confirmation by the Commission on Appointments was delayed due to the need for additional documentation regarding her husband's business interests. The confirmation was deferred until she could submit the required information. Her confirmation was eventually approved on March 24, 2021 although she already took her oath of office on December 23, 2020.

Ferolino was actively involved in overseeing the 2022 Philippine general election, ensuring compliance with electoral laws, and resolving disputes related to candidacy and vote counting. In early 2022, she was tasked with drafting the resolution on the disqualification cases against then-presidential candidate Bongbong Marcos. Some groups accused her of delaying the ruling, but she denied the allegations, stating that due diligence was necessary to ensure a fair judgment. She also accused then fellow Commissioner Rowena Guanzon of attempting to influence the decision by publicly disclosing her vote against Marcos before the official ruling was released. The dispute led to tensions within COMELEC, with Ferolino calling for an impartial resolution of the case.

In April 2022, following the resignation of Commissioner Socorro Inting as chairperson of the Committee on Firearms and Security Concerns, Ferolino was appointed as the acting chair of the committee. In May 2023, Ferolino has been designated as the head of the Steering Committee for the 2025 National and Local Elections.

She is also the Commissioner in charge of the committees for Random Manual Audit (RMA), Packing and Shipping Committee (PSC), Vulnerable Sector's Office (VSO), Plebiscites, and Office for Overseas Voting (OFOV).

As commissioner, Ferolino has represented COMELEC in international election organizations, serving as Vice Chairperson of both the Association of Asian Election Authorities (AAEA) and the Association of World Election Bodies (AWEB).

Preceded by Al Parreño	Commissioner of the Commission on Elections; 2020–2027	Incumbent
