= AER (motorcycles) =

- Type: Private
- Industry: Motorcycle
- Founded: 1937
- Founder: Albert E. Reynolds
- Defunct: 1940
- Fate: Ceased motorcycle production
- Headquarters: Liverpool, United Kingdom
- Key people: Albert E. Reynolds
- Products: Motorcycles

AER was a British motorcycle manufacturer. The name was from the initials of the founder, Albert E. Reynolds. Based in Liverpool and his company, AE Reynolds Ltd., ceased motorcycle production on the outbreak of the Second World War.

== History ==
Founded in 1937 by Albert E. Reynolds, a Scott Motorcycles dealer who began producing high quality motorcycles to his own design. Reynolds had been influential in the development of a number of "de-luxe" Scott specials built between 1931 and 1934. He was disappointed that the Scott triple failed to be developed and that Scotts were not interestedin his idea for a series of 125 cc engined motorcycles he set up as an independent producer. The first AER motorcycle was a Scott engined twin-cylinder unit-construction motorcycle called the Reynolds Special. It was a 340 cc twin-cylinder air-cooled two-stroke with an alloy engine and pressed-in cylinder liners. The head and block were each in one piece and the crankcase was made from four castings with air passages to cool between the cylinders. The production model was launched in 1938 and featured ignition by a flywheel magneto and a dynamo in front of the crankcase.

In 1939 Reynolds developed motorcycles with 249 cc and 350 cc Villiers engines. Motor Cycling magazine tested the 250 cc AER for the 30 November 1939 issue and reported that "Its charm lay in its excellent steering and road holding which gave a supreme feeling of confidence on greasy roads and invited fast cornering." A 250 cc AER can be seen at the Museum of Liverpool. Production was ended by the outbreak of the Second World War. After the war Reynolds reverted to motorcycle sales and servicing.
