= AERS =

AERS may refer to:

- Advanced Economic Research Systems
- Adverse Event Reporting System
- Alaska Educational Radio System, a broadcaster in Alaska
- All Electricity from Renewable Sources projects, including The Climate Reality Project
- Applied Educational Research Scheme, a programme funded by the Scottish Executive Education Department and the Scottish Higher Education Funding Council
- Applied Energy Recovery Systems
- Atlantic Estuarine Research Society
- aers, possessive Lindsay version of Spivak pronoun

== See also ==
- Aers, surname
