= A.E.R. (automobile) =

A.E.R. was a French automobile manufacturer and one-time subsidiary of B.N.C.; the marque offered two cars patterned on American models. One was a sidevalve 1991cc six-cylinder with CIME engine; the other used a Lycoming side valve straight-eight of 4241 cc and Delaunay-Belleville chassis. Unusually, suspension was by a pneumatic device which soon proved unreliable. Production ceased after one year of manufacture (1930), but the cars were later reissued under the name Aigle, in models using conventional suspension.
