= Campaign Against the Return of the Marcoses and Martial Law =

The Campaign Against the Return of the Marcoses and Martial Law (CARMMA) is a Philippines-based coalition of victims under President Ferdinand Marcos' martial law. It was launched on February 4, 2016. The group is composed of martial law victims, civil libertarians, peace and freedom advocates, and militant groups. It has campaigned against the return to power of the family of Philippine dictator Ferdinand Marcos. It has also called for a review of history textbooks that seek to revise history and rehabilitate the Marcoses' image. The Marcoses have been accused of plunder and human rights abuses, while Imelda Marcos has been convicted of seven counts of graft. Bongbong Marcos ran for vice president and lost to Leni Robredo in 2016. Imee Marcos won a seat in the Senate in 2019.

== Video ==
CARMMA launched a video that introduced millennials to the abuses of martial law. The 4-minute video showed voters aged 19 to 22 being asked by older people about their impressions of martial law. Interviewers then recounted their personal experiences of being detained, tortured, and raped during martial law. The video showed the participants’ reactions of embarrassment and shock and expression of sympathy at the experiences told by their interviewers. The video received more than a million views and was shared 45,000 times within 8 hours of being uploaded.
