= Action For Economic Reforms =

Philippine non-government organization

Action for Economic Reforms
- Company type: public interest organization
- Industry: research and advocacy
- Founded: 1996
- Headquarters: West Trade Center, West Avenue, Quezon City 1104
- Area served: Philippines
- Key people: See Women and Men of AER
- Products: policy analysis, publications
- Website: http://www.aer.ph "...General principles are not enough to deal with complex issues that require nuanced analysis. The gains of the reform struggle will ultimately be measured in concrete terms: the specific features, the context, the enabling conditions, the timing, the phasing, and the sequencing..." - From Chartering New Paths, AER's mission statement

Action for Economic Reforms (AER) is a Philippine non-government organization engaged in research and advocacy. It was founded in 1996 by a group of progressive scholars and activists as an "independent, reform-oriented and activist policy group".

AER works on macroeconomic issues, with an emphasis on fiscal policy and tax policy and administration, and looks at their impact on equity, poverty reduction, and sustainability. As part of its macroeconomic intervention, AER also addresses exchange rate, monetary, and trade issues.

AER likewise concerns itself with creating the conditions for long-term growth. In this context, AER gives attention to the role of institutions. It has pursued advocacy on building state capacity that will enable markets and correct both market and government failures. A key aspect of the work on institutions is the promotion of transparency, especially pushing for a Freedom of Information law in the Philippines.

AER also forges strong links with civil society organizations, legislators and other government officials, as well as technocrats and academics towards building alliances to secure progressive reforms.

While Philippine concerns occupy an extensive part of its programs, AER is also known for its regional and global work on crucial development issues like financing for development, the Millennium Development Goals, international trade, capital flows, regional integration as well as government transparency and disclosure. Among official multilateral institutions that AER has worked with are United Nations agencies, the World Bank, the International Monetary Fund, the Asian Development Bank, and the European Union. Among AER's international NGO partners are Christian Aid, Oxfam, Focus on the Global South, the Global Transparency Initiative, the International Development Economic Associates (IDEAs) and the Tax Justice Network. It has also collaborated with economists including Nobel Prize recipient Joseph Stiglitz and UN Assistant Secretary-General for Economic Development Jomo K. Sundaram.

AER writes weekly columns in two major Philippine business dailies. Yellow Pad is published in the BusinessWorld and takes on political, social and economic policy issues affecting the Philippines. Manuel Buencamino writes political commentaries for AER in the Business Mirror column, called Dispatches from the Enchanted Kingdom. These articles, policy papers, and statements can be found on the AER website as well as in the Socioeconomic Research Portal of the Philippines. AER has publications such as The State and the Market : Essays on a Socially Oriented Philippine Economy and The Philippine Electric Power Industry Reform.
