= Vicente Danao =

Retired Lieutenant General of the Philippine National Police

Vicente D. Danao Jr.

Commander of Area Police Command - Western Mindanao of the Philippine National Police
- In office August 8, 2022 – August 10, 2023
- President: Bongbong Marcos
- Preceded by: PMGen. Eden T. Ugale (OIC)
- Succeeded by: PLtGen. Jonnel C. Estomo

Deputy Chief for Operations of the Philippine National Police
- In office May 2, 2022 – August 8, 2022
- President: Rodrigo Duterte; Bongbong Marcos
- Preceded by: PLtGen. Ferdinand O. Divina
- Succeeded by: PMGen. Benjamin D. Santos Jr.

Chief of the Philippine National Police
- Officer-In-Charge
- In office May 8, 2022 – August 1, 2022
- President: Rodrigo Duterte; Bongbong Marcos
- Preceded by: PGen. Dionardo Carlos
- Succeeded by: PGen. Rodolfo Azurin Jr.

Chief of Directorial Staff of the Philippine National Police
- In office March 1, 2022 – May 15, 2022
- President: Rodrigo Duterte
- Preceded by: PLtGen. Rhodel O. Sermonia
- Succeeded by: PLtGen. Manuel M. Abu

Regional Director of the National Capital Region Police Office
- In office November 10, 2020 – March 1, 2022
- President: Rodrigo Duterte
- Preceded by: PMGen. Debold Sinas
- Succeeded by: PMGen. Felipe R. Natividad

Regional Director of Police Regional Office IV-A (Calabarzon)
- In office October 20, 2019 – November 10, 2020
- President: Rodrigo Duterte
- Preceded by: PBGen. Edward Carranza
- Succeeded by: PBGen. Felipe Natividad

District Director of the Manila Police District
- In office November 9, 2018 – October 20, 2019
- Mayor: Joseph Estrada; Isko Moreno Domagoso
- Preceded by: PCSupt. Rolando Anduyan
- Succeeded by: PBGen. Bernabe Balba

City Director of the Davao City Police Office
- In office October 18, 2013 – June 24, 2016
- Mayor: Rodrigo Duterte
- Preceded by: PSSupt. Ronald dela Rosa
- Succeeded by: PSSupt. Michael John Dubria

Personal details
- Born: Vicente Dupa Danao Jr. August 10, 1967 (age 58) Bayombong, Nueva Vizcaya, Philippines
- Education: Philippine Military Academy (B.Sc. Mil.)
- Police career
- Service: Philippine National Police
- Divisions: Area Police Command - Western Mindanao; Office of the Chief, PNP; Deputy Chief for Operations; Directorial Staff; Criminal Investigation and Detection Group; Inter-Agency Committee on Anti-Illegal Drugs National Anti-Illegal Drugs Task Force; Directorate for Intelligence; Special Action Force
- Police offices: NCR PRO; — Manila Police District; Calabarzon PRO; Davao City Police Office
- Service years: 1991–2023
- Rank: Police Lieutenant General

Vicente "Vic" Dupa Danao Jr. (born August 10, 1967) is a retired Filipino law enforcement officer and former commander of Area Police Command-Western Mindanao. Danao was with the Philippine National Police for over 29 years and served as Officer-in-Charge of the Philippine National Police from May to August 2022, deputy chief for operations, chief of the National Capital Region Police Office from 2020 until 2022, deputy director for operations of the Criminal Investigation and Detection Group, as task force commander under the Inter-Agency Committee on Anti-Illegal Drugs, and as chief of police in two cities and two regions. His longest term as police chief was between October 2013 and June 2016 in Davao City.

== Early life and education ==
Danao is a native of Nueva Vizcaya and was born on August 10, 1967. He was raised in Bayombong and attended Saint Mary's College where he completed his high school education in 1984. Danao then entered the Philippine Military Academy in Baguio where he received his officer cadet training as a part of the graduating class of 1991, the PMA Sambisig Class.

== Career ==
Danao was drafted into the Southern Mindanao Regional Special Action Force immediately after completing his military training in 1991. He was commissioned as a junior officer deployed in the operations against Communist insurgents and was stationed in the province of Surigao del Sur for four years. In 1995, he began his law enforcement career when he enlisted in the Philippine National Police as a SWAT commander for the Davao City Police Office. He earned his first promotion to Senior Inspector the following year when he also began serving as station commander.

For eleven years beginning in 1996, Danao was posted to five different districts in Davao City as a station chief. He was first posted to the Baguio police station, followed by Marilog in 1998, and Calinan in 1999 which he headed until 2002 and where he received his second promotion as chief inspector in 2000. Danao also served briefly as station chief for Sasa district and as head of the Davao City Police Office anti-vice regulation unit before his designation as Talomo police chief with his rank upgraded to police superintendent in 2003. As chief of the Talomo Police Station, Danao was suspended by the Office of the Ombudsman for six months in 2005 along with two other precinct commanders and former Davao police chief Conrado Laza for their negligence and incompetence in solving the spate of murders allegedly committed by a Davao Death Squad between 1998 and 2004. The suspension order was subsequently reversed by the Court Appeals after a petition was filed.

Danao then moved up to the Davao Region Police Regional Office XI and took up the post of Deputy Director for Operation in 2007. He also served as the region's chief of the Security Agencies and Group Supervisions Division in the same year. Danao held three more posts at the regional office before returning to the Davao City Police Office in 2013: Director of the PRO11 Regional Mobile Group (2008–2009); Deputy Director for Logistics Research and Development (2009–2011); and Director for Logistics Research and Development (2011–2013). In April 2010, Danao and 25 other officers of the Davao City Police Office and Police Regional Office 11 were ordered suspended by the Ombudsman for six months in connection with the unsolved killings complaint filed by Davao City Deserves Good Government Movement which accused them of having a direct involvement in the Davao death squad that the movement said was responsible for the murder of at least 800 persons between 2005 and 2008. The Court of Appeals rejected the Ombudsman decision in July 2010 and lifted the suspension order after it found that the Ombudsman committed grave abuse of discretion when it used raw statistics despite the absence of evidence pointing to police neglect. In March 2012, Ombudsman Conchita Carpio-Morales ordered a fine equivalent to a month's salary against Danao and 20 other police officers for neglect of duty in connection with the same complaint filed by the movement.

In October 2013, Davao City Mayor Rodrigo Duterte chose Danao as Davao City's new police chief to replace Ronald dela Rosa who transferred to Quezon City after being appointed as head of the PNP Intelligence Group. He revived the Oplan Tokhang program started by his predecessor to address the city's persistent drug problem. In September 2014, Danao figured in a domestic abuse controversy with his wife, Susie Danao. Videos of Danao beating his wife circulated on social media which led to the filing of a complaint and a temporary suspension. He was reinstated to his post one month later after being cleared in an investigation. Danao served as Davao police chief until the end of Mayor Duterte's term in June 2016.

Danao transferred to the PNP Directorate for Intelligence in Camp Crame as counterintelligence chief at the start of Duterte's term as president. He also served as Deputy Chief for Operations of the PNP Criminal Investigation and Detection Group until 2018. In a Senate hearing on alleged extrajudicial killings during the Philippine drug war in September 2016, Danao and four other former Davao cops were accused of torture and arbitrary detention by self-confessed assassin Edgar Matobato.

In May 2017, Danao assumed command of the National Anti-Illegal Drugs Task Force under the Inter-Agency Committee on Anti-Illegal Drugs. He then transferred to the nation's capital and served as Chief of the Manila Police District beginning November 2018 where he received his promotion to Police Chief Superintendent equivalent to Brigadier General rank. In November 2018, he said "If I discover anyone involved in drugs especially those who distribute and destroy them, I will kill you." As Manila police chief, Danao ordered the suspension of at least 15 cops with alleged ties to illegal drugs and laid a murder charge against a Sampaloc barangay captain who was an alleged drug lord.

Danao was then assigned with the Police Regional Office IV-A based in Calamba, Laguna in October 2019. As Calabarzon police chief, he is credited for the surrender of 131 Communist rebels operating in indigenous tribe lands in Rizal, Quezon and Laguna provinces in July 2020. On November 10, 2020, Interior Secretary Eduardo Año announced Danao's formal designation as Chief of the National Capital Region Police Office.

In March 2022, he was designated as the chief of PNP Directorial Staff. Upon his designation, he was promoted as police lieutenant general. In May 2, 2022, he was promoted as deputy chief of operations. In May 8, upon retirement of PGen. Dionardo Carlos, Pres. Duterte announced Danao's formal designation as Officer-in-Charge of the Philippine National Police. Danao is among the "Davao Boys", a small circle of Duterte's trusted associates, which included police officers who were previously posted to Davao and later tasked to implement the nationwide drug war, and afterwards given choice government assignments.

On February 13, 2026, the International Criminal Court included Danao among eight indirect co-perpetrators in the crimes against humanity case against president Duterte during the Philippine drug war.

=== Key positions ===
- City director, Davao City Police Office
- Deputy director, PNP CIDG
- Director, Manila Police District
- Regional director, Police Regional Office 4A CALABARZON
- Regional director, NCRPO
- Chief of directorial Staff
- Deputy chief PNP for Operations
  - Officer-in-charge, PNP (concurrent capacity)
- Commander, Area Police Command - Western Mindanao

== Awards ==
Danao received the Medalya ng Kadakilaan (PNP Heroism Medal) for his leadership and outstanding performance in the successful rescue of an Indian kidnapped victim in Davao City in April 2015. He also received three separate commendations from the Mayor of Davao City for the arrest of suspects in the killing of businessman Ramon Garcia in June 2014, and for solving the Matina massacre in New Lanzona Village and the arrest of the Balbacua gang members involved in the killing of a foreigner during his tenure as Talomo police chief.
