= 2017 Ozamiz police raid =

Police raid in Ozamiz, Philippines

- Part of the Philippine drug war
- Date: July 30, 2017
- Time: 02:30 (PST)
- Location: Ozamiz, Misamis Occidental, Philippines
- Type: Police raid
- Deaths: 16 (Note: 15 died in the July 30 raid. A nephew of the Parojinog family died later in the hospital.)
- Arrests: Nova Princess Parojinog-Echavez; Reynaldo Parojinog Jr.; Ricardo "Ardot/Patok" Parojinog (Note: He was arrested in Taiwan on May 24, 2018 after 10 months of hiding.)
- Charges: Violation of Sec 11, R.A. 9165; Sec 21, R.A. 10591 and Sec. 3-A, R.A. 9516

At dawn of Sunday, July 30, 2017, the Criminal Investigation and Detection Group (CIDG) and the Ozamiz City police conducted simultaneous raids in the house of the Parojinogs in Ozamiz and other associated properties, leaving 15 persons dead, including incumbent Mayor Reynaldo Parojinog and his wife. Another member of the Parojinog family died in the hospital three days after the raid. Parojinog is the third mayor to be killed during the course of country's war on drugs after Rolando Espinosa of Albuera, Leyte eight months prior and Samsudin Dimaukom of Datu Saudi Ampatuan, Maguindanao nine months prior.

== Background ==
Reynaldo Parojinog was among the persons named by President Rodrigo Duterte on August 7, 2016, as allegedly involved in the illegal drug trade. Parojinog denied any links to illegal drugs.

== Incident ==
On July 30, 2017, 2:30am (PST), the raids took place at several of Parojinog's properties in Barangays Baybay San Roque and Baybay Santa Cruz. The Ozamiz City police and the Criminal Investigation Group issued six search warrants against city mayor Reynaldo "Aldong" Parojinog Sr. and two others – for reportedly storing guns in his house – as well as Vice Mayor Nova Princess Parojinog-Echavez, and City Councilor Ricardo "Ardot" Parojinog, and for the farm houses of Mayor Parojinog, Board Member Octavio "Avio" Parojinog Jr., and one other person.

Senior Superintendent Jaysen de Guzman, head of the Misamis Occidental provincial police office, said that the CIDG was about to serve a warrant, when the Parojinogs' security fired at them, prompting police to retaliate. Parojinogs' aide Jeffrey Ocang denied that there had been an exchange of gunfire and said "the mayor's camp did not fire a shot." De Guzman said that the clash with Parojinogs' men lasted two hours, and that police managed to breach the mayor's house, but was still met with resistance by the mayor. The authorities recovered an M79 rifle, grenades, .45 pistols, about P1.4 million in cash, 500 grams of suspected illegal drugs, two cellphones, and an M16 rifle in the Mayor's house.

One shotgun, three rocket propelled grenade launchers, two hand grenades, eight M79 ammunition, and an M79 rifle were recovered from councilor Parojinog's house.

A cellphone video, obtained by GMA News, was recorded during the raid showing Vice Mayor Nova Princess Parojinog-Echavez, Reynaldo's daughter, suddenly getting something from her bag while the police were searching her room inside her house. The female police officer caught her doing something and had to pry open her hands to get the item, a packet with something white inside. The police immediately arrested her. The police found 10 plastic sachets of crystal meth ("shabu"), 50 pieces of rolled aluminum foil, 500 P1,000 bills, 1,800 P500 bills, one M16 rifle, one M16 magazine and 13 live rounds for an M16 inside her house.

15 people were killed during the raid, including Reynaldo Parojinog Sr., his wife Susan, and his siblings Octavio Jr. and Mona. Parojinog-Echavez and her brother Reynaldo Jr. were arrested and transferred to the national police headquarters at Camp Crame in Manila.

== Aftermath ==
Ozamiz City police chief Jovie Espenido admitted to the media that police had destroyed the CCTV cameras installed in the house in order to protect the identities of the informants who helped them in the operation. However, Philippine National Police (PNP) chief Ronald dela Rosa stated that destroying the CCTV cameras was "wrong". Espenido recounted that the Philippine National Police conducted raids before dawn to avoid more casualties. Vice Mayor Parojinog-Echavez appealed to President Rodrigo Duterte and the Senate to investigate the deaths.

The Commission on Human Rights (CHR), on July 31, launched its investigation for the deaths. Dela Rosa said that the death of the Parojinogs should "serve as a warning to mayors with links to drugs" and mayors are warned not to fight the police. The Parojinog camp filed a case against the CIDG for detaining Nova Princess and Reynaldo Parojinog Jr., who should have been released from detention after 36 hours. The CIDG admitted they had encountered a problem in transporting the Parajinog siblings, thus causing the delay.

In an interview on ABS-CBN News, according to a former hitman and drug courier known only as "Noel", many of his colleagues working for the Parojinogs have gone missing. Noel was sent to Bilibid to get a kilogram of shabu, to be delivered to Ozamiz and distributed to Reynaldo Parojinog Sr. and his daughter Nova Princess. (Note: —Translated from Google.— Already 'alias' Noel', former 'catapult' and drug trafficker for the Parojinog family were present in ABS-CBN News. According to Noel, more and more colleagues working for the Parojinog are now missing and unable to get home. Noel worked for the Parojinog for 20 years. He said he was sent to the Bilibid to get a kilogram of shabu delivered to Ozamiz. When it comes to Ozamiz, Parojinog distributes illegal drugs. Among them were Ozamiz city mayor Reynaldo "Aldong" Parojinog, Sr. And his son vice mayor Nova Princess Parojinog. The mayor was killed in a raid on his house on Sunday, July 30. While his son, Nova Princess, was arrested. Family operations are not just illegal drugs. They are also calling for a hoax. Noel also tried to kill and chop the bodies of people who were not in line with the Parojinog. Because of fear, Noel did not have to leave the family office. When the people did not obey the Parojinog command, they were put to death. Noel also warned that the Parojinogs had hidden weapons against captains, government employees and close family friends. According to Ozamiz City Police Chief Insp. Jovie Espenido, since June, has left more than 200 firearms on them from Parojinog (ABS-CBN News))

On August 2, Senator Leila de Lima filed a resolution calling for a Senate investigation on the "suspicious" circumstances surrounding the raid. Senator Panfilo Lacson said that the Senate investigation will start only if the witnesses are available. Vice President Leni Robredo supported the call for an investigation. Due to an ultimatum given by Espenido to barangay officials, who allegedly were given illegal firearms from the Parojinogs, more than 300 firearms were surrendered to the Police. Paraffin tests conducted by the Philippine National Police showed that eight – including Mayor Parojinog Sr. and his brother Octavio Jr. – of the 15 slain individuals tested positive for gunpowder burns, indicating they engaged the police.

On August 4, the Department of Justice filed criminal cases against the Parojinog siblings.

The motion filed by the Parojinog siblings to attend the wake of their parents and other family members on August 13 was denied by Ozamiz Regional Trial Court. A drug test conducted on August 15 showed that the Parojinog siblings were tested negative for drug use.

Reynaldo's brother, Ricardo Parojinog, was arrested in Taiwan on May 24, 2018, after 10 months of hiding. He was later found dead in his jail cell on September 4, 2020.

=== Disputed statements ===
The police statement of the raid has been disputed by the Parojinog family and its eyewitness:

Parojinog-Echavez said that the police "planted" the evidence of contraband that they seized, an allegation denied by de Guzman.

An unnamed survivor and a relative of the Parojinogs said in TV interviews that there was no exchange of gunfire as the police invaded and shot everyone inside the mayor's house. A neighbor of the mayor said that it was a "massacre". One unidentified eyewitness appeared, said that the police threw a grenade at the Parojinogs' men. According to Espenido, a grenade exploded as a Parojinog bodyguard tried to toss it at the approaching police officers.

Another eyewitness named "Joe", via phone interview on ABS-CBN News, said that the police planted the explosives at the house, while drug paraphernalia was planted in his room.

== Reactions ==
Senate Minority Leader Franklin Drilon expressed concern over the death of Mayor Parojinog. He stressed that the circumstances of the incident are similar to the fate of Albuera, Leyte Mayor Rolando Espinosa, who was killed in November 2016, stating:

"Why are search warrants, served before dawn as in the cases of Mayor Espinosa and now, Mayor Parojinog, result in the deaths of the persons being searched? Both are tagged as drug lords. Too much of a coincidence?"

However, the warrant clearly states it could be served anytime.

Senator Panfilo Lacson said that "at least" the Parojinogs were not killed inside a detention facility. Lacson also said that Octavio "Ongkoy" Parojinog Sr., the father of Mayor Parojinog, city councilor Ricardo, and board member Octavio Jr., was the founder of Kuratong Baleleng, an organized crime syndicate based in Mindanao. On August 1, de Lima, through the handwritten statement, said that the raid was a "massacre" and a "plain and simple extermination" of Duterte's former comrades in vigilantism. Senator Antonio Trillanes, a Duterte critic, described the killings as a "rub-out", stating it is another proof of how Duterte's policy flouts human rights, due process and the rule of law, and further reinforces the criminal cases filed against him. Magdalo party-list representative and Duterte critic, Gary Alejano called the raid "highly suspicious".

== See also ==
- Philippine drug war
- Death of Rolando Espinosa
- Rodrigo Duterte's August 7, 2016 speech
