= Jovie Espenido =

Filipino police officer

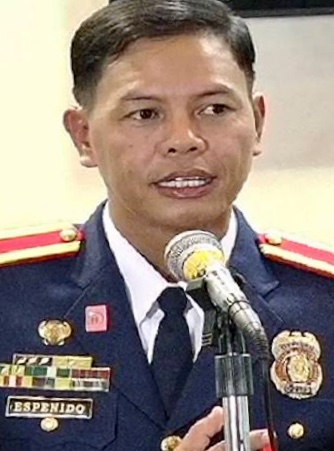
- PLTCOL Jovie Espenido in 2020

Personal details
- Born: Jovie R. Espenido; October 19, 1968 (age 58) San Miguel, Surigao del Sur, Philippines
- Spouse: Shiela Bandal
- Children: 3 daughters
- Occupation: Policeman
- Nickname: Duterte's Drug War Poster Boy
- Police career
- Service: Philippine National Police
- Police offices: Police Regional Office 7; Police Regional Office 10; Police Regional Office 8; Police Regional Office 6; Misamis Occidental Police Provincial Office; Bacolod City Police Office; Leyte Police Provincial Office; Samar Police Provincial Office; Negros Oriental Provincial Mobile Force Company
- Service years: 1996-2024
- Rank: Police Lieutenant Colonel

Police Lieutenant Colonel Jovie Espenido is a controversial retired Filipino police officer known as a crusader against illegal drugs.

== Early life ==
Espenido was born on October 19, 1968, in San Miguel, Surigao del Sur, Philippines. He is the seventh of ten siblings. His parents, Josepina and Vicente, gave “Jovie” a name that fused their own.

He is a licensed criminologist and has a Bachelor of Science in Criminology. He possesses skills in electronics and mechanics.

== Career ==
On September 16, 1996, Espenido entered the Philippine National Police and the Regional Mobile Group (RMG) 7, particularly in Negros Oriental as his first assignment.

In 2005, he was assigned to Ormoc's City Police Office. During his assignment, he caught the city's former mayor, Eric Codilla, patronizing illegal logging operations. In 2008, the PNP promoted him to Inspector (Lieutenant).

In 2010, when he was the Chief of Police of Gandara Municipal Police Station, Espenido seized the former mayor and his political goons who illegally kept firearms in Gandara, Samar. Various most wanted criminals in the town were also nabbed during his term.

On July 13, 2016, a fortnight into Duterte's rule, the PNP assigned him to Albuera, a fishing town 30 minutes from Ormoc.

On October 16, 2019, Espenido was assigned as the Deputy City Director for Operations of the Bacolod Police Office in Western Visayas.

In 2020, he was reassigned back to Eastern Visayas by PNP Chief Police General Archie Gamboa to hold the post of the Deputy Provincial Director for Operations of the Samar Police Provincial Office in Catbalogan.

== Awards and decorations ==
- Philippine Republic Presidential Unit Citation
- Meritorious Achievement Medal
- Distinguished Service Medal
- Military Civic Action Medal
- Military Commendation Medals
- Medalya ng Kagalingan (PNP Medal of Merit)
- Medalya ng Kasanayan (PNP Efficiency Medal)
- Medalya ng Papuri (PNP Commendation Medal)
- Medalya ng Ugnayang Pampulisya (PNP Police Relations Medal)
- Medalya ng Mabuting Asal (PNP Good Conduct Medal)
- Medalya ng Paglilingkod (PNP Service Medal)

== Personal life ==
Espenido is married to Shiela Bandal. They have three daughters. He is a member of the Seventh-day Adventist Church and a vegetarian.

== Controversies and criticism ==
=== Bloody raid of ‘Martilyo Gang’ ===
The Department of Justice (DOJ) filed homicide raps against Espenido for a ‘Martilyo Gang’ raid that killed six people in Ozamiz City.

=== Inclusion in Duterte’s drug watchlist ===
On February 12, 2020, DILG Secretary Eduardo Año announced that Espenido was among the 357 policemen on President Rodrigo Duterte's drug watchlist, also known as narco list.

=== Killing of Mayor Rolando Espinosa ===
On November 5, 2016, Rolando Espinosa, then mayor of Albuera, Leyte, was killed in a Baybay City Provincial Jail cell by policemen who claimed they were serving a search warrant. A month later, Espenido was removed from his post after he was named by Espinosa's son, Kerwin, as the conduit to Ronnie Dayan, the alleged bagman of Sen. Leila de Lima, whom the Duterte administration had detained on drug trafficking charges.

=== Assassination of Mayor Parojinog ===
Espenido earned various criticism regarding the bloody operation against members of the influential family of Ozamiz City Mayor Reynaldo Parojinog Sr. who was allegedly involved in the illegal drug trade.

=== Alleged illegal maneuvers to discredit the drug war ===
In August 2024, Espenido testified before the House Committee that Senator Ronald dela Rosa directed the criminal cases dismissal against Kerwin Espinosa and Mayor Reynaldo Parojinog. He also accused Bong Go of sourcing intelligence funds from POGOs for Rodrigo Duterte's drug war.
