= Cardboard Justice =

Cardboard Justice is a term coined by Hope Swann, a teacher from De La Salle University in Manila, Philippines. It refers to the extrajudicial killings of criminals, especially the drug peddlers in Philippines. The term is refers to the practice of some vigilante groups leaving a cardboard placard on the murdered person with "Pusher Ako" (transl. I'm a [Drug] pusher) written on it. Adrienne Onday, a researcher and feminist activist, then a student at the University of the Philippines, was inspired by Hope Swann, and travelled from Quezon City to Manila with a cardboard placard with “Lahat tayo posibleng drug pusher” (transl. All of us are possibly drug pushers). The movement took off in Philippines, with many young people protesting against Cardboard Justice being carried out across the country.

== See also ==
- Philippine drug war
