= Rodrigo Duterte's August 7, 2016, speech =

Speech by Philippine President Rodrigo Duterte

On 7 August 2016, Philippine President Rodrigo Duterte revealed the names of 150 "high value target" public officials, including mayors, local government executives, legislators, police, military and judges, found to be involved in illegal drug trade in a speech at the Naval Station Felix Apolinario in Camp Panacan, Davao City, which was during his wake visit to four NavForEastMin soldiers killed during clashes with the New People's Army in Compostela Valley. Duterte described the drugs situation in the country as "pandemic" after 600,000 drug dealers and dependents have surrendered to the police in just one month since he took office.

== Background ==
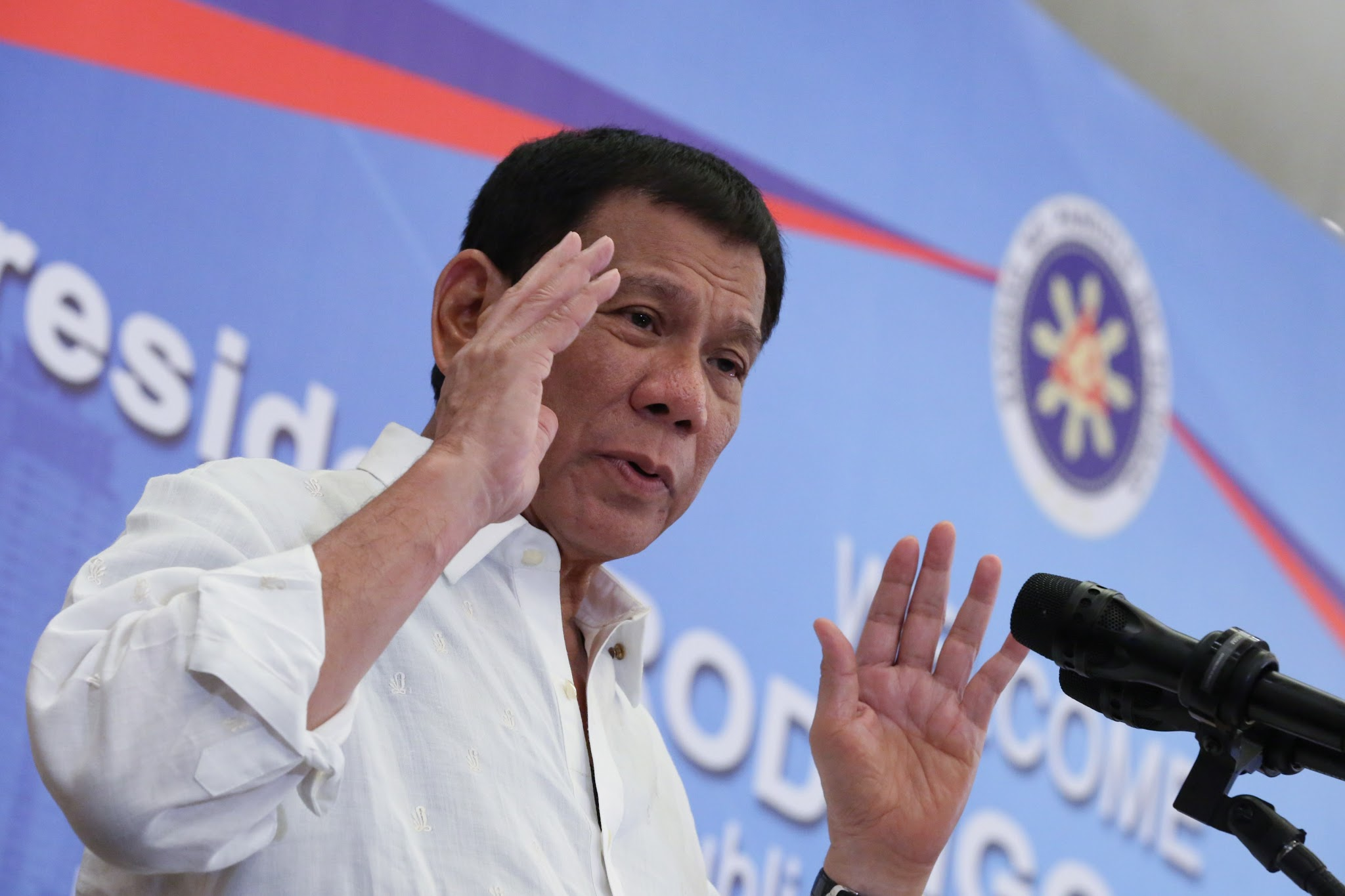
Duterte, 2016

Rodrigo Duterte ran his presidential campaign on a ruthless anti-crime and anti-drugs platform. Following his landslide victory in the May 2016 elections, the Philippine drug war was launched to fulfill his campaign promise of wiping out criminality in the country within six months.

The speech was not the first time that Duterte named and shamed government officials with links to illegal drugs. In his speech before military personnel at the 69th anniversary of the Philippine Air Force in Clark Air Base on July 5, 2016, he read out the names of five Philippine National Police (PNP) generals who he said "contributed to the deterioration of law and order in this country." They were retired Deputy Director General Marcelo Garbo Jr., National Capital Region Police Director Chief Superintendent Joel Pagdilao, Quezon City Police Chief Superintendent Edgardo Tinio, Western Visayas Police Chief Superintendent Bernardo Diaz, and retired Chief Superintendent and now Daanbantayan Mayor Vicente Loot. Saying he was "compelled by sense of duty" to inform the public, Duterte also ordered the five generals relieved from service and to report to PNP Director General Ronald dela Rosa within 24 hours to undergo investigation.

Ten days later, on July 15, 2016, Duterte revealed that a list of politicians with links to the narcotics trade was presented to him by intelligence agencies and that he would announce their names once the information was validated.

On August 1, 2016, Duterte through a statement read by Malacañang Palace spokesman Ernesto Abella identified the first "narco-politician" as Albuera Mayor Rolando Espinosa Sr. whom he ordered to surrender to PNP General dela Rosa within 24 hours together with his drug lord son after the mayor's staff were arrested during a buy-and-bust operation where police seized P1.9 million worth of methamphetamine. Four days later, three local government officials, Maguing Mayor Mamaulan Abinal Molok, Ampatuan Mayor Rasul Sangki, and former Marantao Mayor Mohammad Ali Abinal, voluntarily surrendered to the PNP ahead of the announcement of Duterte's "narco list".

== Speech ==
In the early hours of August 7, 2016, during his visit to the wake of four soldiers killed by the New People's Army (NPA) at the NavForEastMin headquarters in Davao, Duterte criticized the Communist Party of the Philippines (CPP), whom his administration was pursuing peace talks with, for using land mines. He began his speech by citing the Geneva Conventions.

I would like to address myself to the Communist Party of the Philippines, I would like to talk to you about rules of war. Kasi po [Because], if it is to your advantage, and I have been around in government for the last 40 years, you are the very first to cry foul when something goes wrong, even in the handling of prisoners. Marami pong sundalo na dinemanda ninyo [You have accused many of our soldiers] under ‘yang [that] Geneva Convention in the handling of prisoners. But, one of the important and maybe a very humane provision, ‘yang binabawal po ‘yung [is the prohibition of (the use) of] land mine.

Even as the government and the CPP-NPA have earlier stated their commitment to seek an end to the communist rebellion in the Philippines, Duterte had also earlier expressed his disappointment at CPP founder Jose Maria Sison for failing to reciprocate his government's ceasefire declaration made during his First State of the Nation Address. Duterte warned the CPP that if they fail to include the prohibition of land mines in the scheduled peace talks in Oslo, his government would pull out from the talks and continue the war for another 45 years.

Right after his short address to the CPP, Duterte proceeded to his report on the "narco list" which he promised earlier to reveal and which he claimed to have come from military and police intelligence. Duterte said:

Now, I am reading now the personalities in the Philippines. It might be true, it might not be true. But then, ‘yung sinasabi ninyong [those of you saying] due process, isa yan [that's one thing]. Baka sakaling mademanda itong mga taong ito [If these people are filed with charges], administrative or criminal, then this should have due process. Presumption of innocence. Lahat ‘yan sa [They are all provided in the] Constitution, ibigay ko ‘yan [I will give it to them].

Noting that he is only performing his sworn duty as president to inform the public on matters of their own security and doing it as part of his campaign to cleanse and purge the government of illegal drugs and corruption, Duterte then presented the enormity of the drugs problem in the Philippines. He stated that there were 3 million drug dealers and users in the country in 2014 based on a report from the Philippine Drug Enforcement Agency. He added that this number has gone up in the last two years and that 92% of all villages in Metro Manila are now contaminated with drugs.

Before announcing the names of narco officials on the list, Duterte narrated how some of those officials he would be naming had been his friends and some even supported him in the presidential campaign. However, he also said that he would rather resign as president than be tied to them. Duterte blamed the government officials for what he called a drug pandemic by saying:

Kaya umabot tayo ng 600,000, buong Pilipinas kasi may naglaro. Gaano ba kadali bakit napakarami po [We have reached 600,000 (pushers and users who surrendered) because the whole Philippines was being toyed around with. How easy was it and why are there so many (drug dependents)]? How is it that it is in this magnitude? It is because government personnel were into it.

Duterte then began reading the names of the 150 public officials while also describing the specific cases or involvement in the illegal drug trade of some of those politicians.

Local government officials and legislators identified by the President as being involved in illegal drug trade
Official	Position	LGU
Afdal, Abubakar Abdul Karim	Mayor	Labangan, Zamboanga del Sur
Aguilera, Jessie	Mayor	Alegria, Surigao del Norte
Ali, Omar Solitario	Mayor	Marawi
Alingan, Bobby	Mayor	Kolambugan, Lanao del Norte
Amante, Vicente	Mayor	San Pablo, Laguna
Amboy, Francis Ansing	Mayor	Maasin, Iloilo
Bietbeta, Wilfredo	Mayor	Carles, Iloilo
Cañamaque, Beda	Mayor	Basay, Negros Oriental
Castillo, Felix	Mayor	Langiden, Abra
Celeste, Jesus	Mayor	Bolinao, Pangasinan
Celis, Jeffrey	Congressman	?
Dadayan, Muhammad Ali Abinal Jamal	Mayor	Buadiposo-Buntong, Lanao del Sur
De Guzman, Martin	Mayor	Bauang, La Union
Dimaukom, Nida	Vice Mayor	Datu Saudi Ampatuan, Maguindanao
Dimaukom, Samsudin	Mayor	Datu Saudi Ampatuan, Maguindanao
Dolor, Ryan	Mayor	Bauan, Batangas
Echavez, Nova Princess Parojinog	Vice Mayor	Ozamiz
Eriguel, Eufranio	Congressman (Note: Eriguel was identified as "Ex-Mayor (of Agoo)" in the speech, but had already finished his second term as Congressman for the 2nd District of La Union at the time.)	Agoo, La Union
Espinosa, Rolando	Mayor	Albuera, Leyte
Flores, Reynaldo	Mayor	Naguilian, La Union
Garcia, Dante	Mayor	Tubao, La Union
Janihim, Gamar Ahay	Mayor	Sirawai, Zamboanga del Norte
Mabilog, Jed	Mayor	Iloilo City
Macabago, Rasmiyah	Congressman	Lanao del Sur
Macabago, Sabdullah	Mayor	Saguiaran, Lanao del Sur
Macadatu, Muslim Aline	Mayor	Lumbatan, Lanao del Sur
Malones, Marcelo	Mayor	Maasin, Iloilo
Miranda, Jose	Mayor	Santiago, Isabela
Montawal, Otto	Vice Mayor	Datu Montawal, Maguindanao
Montawal, Vicman	Mayor	Datu Montawal, Maguindanao
Morales, Marino	Mayor	Mabalacat
Nava, JC Rahman	Congressman	Guimaras
Navarro, David	Mayor	Clarin, Misamis Occidental
Ong, Hector	Mayor	Laoang, Northern Samar
Ong, Madeleine	Mayor	Laoang, Northern Samar
Pacificador, Julius Ronald	Mayor	Hamtic, Antique
Parojinog, Reynaldo	Mayor	Ozamiz
Parojinog, Ricardo	Board Member	Ozamiz
Pesina, Antonio	Mayor	Iloilo City
Plagata, Erwin Tongtong	Mayor	Iloilo City
Rama, Michael	Mayor	Cebu City
Ramin, Yusufa Munder Bobong	Mayor	Iligan
Romarate, Guillermo Jr.	Congressman	Surigao del Norte
Sabal, Abdul Wahab	Vice Mayor	Talitay, Maguindanao
Sabal, Montaser	Mayor	Talitay, Maguindanao
Sabalones, Fralz	Mayor	San Fernando, Cebu
Salasal, Norodin	Mayor	Datu Salibo, Maguindanao
Salazar, Marjorie Apil	Mayor	Lasam, Cagayan
Salik, Arafat	Vice Mayor	Marawi
Salik, Fahad	Mayor	Marawi
Sangki, Rasul	Mayor	Datu Saudi Ampatuan, Maguindanao
Sentina, Alex	Mayor	Calinog, Iloilo
Trinidad, Edgardo	Vice Mayor	El Nido, Palawan
Tulawie, Benahar	Mayor	Talipao, Sulu
Violago, Goto	Mayor	San Rafael, Bulacan
Note: The list includes both incumbent and former officials.

Judges identified by the President as being involved in illegal drug trade
Judge	LGU
Casiple	Kalibo, Aklan
Dagala, Ezekiel	Dapa, Surigao del Norte
Gonzales, Rene	Iloilo City
Mupas	Dasmariñas
Natividad	Calbayog
Reyes	Baguio
Savilo	Iloilo City
Note: The list includes both active and retired judges.

After expressing his thoughts on earlier criticisms from non-governmental organizations against the campaign, Duterte then began revealing the names of 95 law enforcement and army officers, both active and retired. He reiterated that performing police officers who killed in the performance of their duty will get his protection and pardon, while those that have "allowed themselves to be used" will not get any deliverance from him. He further warned:

Administratively, you’re dead. You separate yourself from the PNP. Do not destroy the young men and women who are true to their country diyan [there]. Huwag ninyong sirain ang [Do not tarnish (the image of) the] PNP. Huwag ninyong sirain ang [Do not tarnish (the image of) the] Armed Forces.

By the time he had reached over a hundred drug personality names, Duterte paused for breath, and with a sad tone, he continued:

I am sorry for my country. I grieve for the agony and suffering of the Republic of the Philippines.

Duterte announced that those he named are relieved of their assignments and that their firearms licenses and permits had also been revoked. He also instructed the police to report to their mother units in PNP and the army to the AFP Chief of Staff within 24 hours for their investigation.

The local government officials named were ordered to report to the Department of the Interior and Local Government, the congressmen to their Speaker of the House of Representatives, and the judges to the Supreme Court, all within 24 hours. They were also told that their firearms licenses and permits had been cancelled and that the local government officials were being stripped of their supervision powers over local police.

Towards the end of the speech, Duterte reiterated that he was taking full responsibility for the listing and the revalidation of the list submitted by his intelligence officers.

== Reaction ==
Chief Justice Maria Lourdes Sereno wrote a letter to Duterte with regards to the judges he named as part of the list of officials alleged to be involved in the illegal drug trade. She expressed her concern on the safety and performance of duty of those judges and called the announcement by Duterte as "premature". In the letter, Sereno also informed the President that Judge Natividad of the Regional Trial Court of Calbayog has been dead since 2008, that Judge Mupas of Dasmariñas had already been dismissed for gross misconduct since 2007, and that Judge Gonzales of the Metropolitan Trial Court of Iloilo City already retired in June 2016. She cautioned those four other judges against surrendering to the police without a warrant of arrest. After a verbal tussle with the President on the legality of his order to the judges and the threat of a martial law arising from a potential constitutional crisis, Sereno eventually agreed to investigate their judges and ordered the PNP and PDEA to submit their formal complaints.

Senator Leila de Lima expressed concerns over the inaccuracies on the President's narco list after a few of those identified have been found to be already dead, or had a different position. She also said there were some names there, "maybe a handful, whom I find hard to believe to be involved in drugs."

Former President and Manila Mayor Joseph Estrada expressed his support for the name and shame campaign of President Duterte. He said that if Duterte does not go after and shame these elected officials, "pretty soon we will have top government officials, even senators, who are in cahoots with drug syndicates."

Archbishop Emeritus Oscar Cruz also voiced his support for Duterte's campaign and said he was "slowly being impressed by his leadership because he means business." While maintaining that he still has doubts with the drug-related killings, he also said he is confident that the President "will fix it" and that Duterte is serious about eliminating the drug menace when he said he was "not afraid to die and is even willing to put his friends in jail."

=== Public reaction ===
Public reaction to the speech has been very enthusiastic and largely "supportive," particularly online. On Facebook, where the "narco list" has been published by several national news outlets, many of the Philippines' 47 million Facebook users have expressed their support for Duterte's hard line on drugs and their desire to see justice handed out to institutional backers of the drug trade. The news link from Inquirer.net alone received 40,800 shares on the day it was published.

== See also ==
- New Bilibid Prison drug trafficking scandal
- Philippine drug war
