= Philippine drug war =

Campaign against the illegal drug trade in the Philippines

- Part of civil conflict in the Philippines and spillovers of the Colombian conflict, the Mexican drug war, and the war against Islamic State
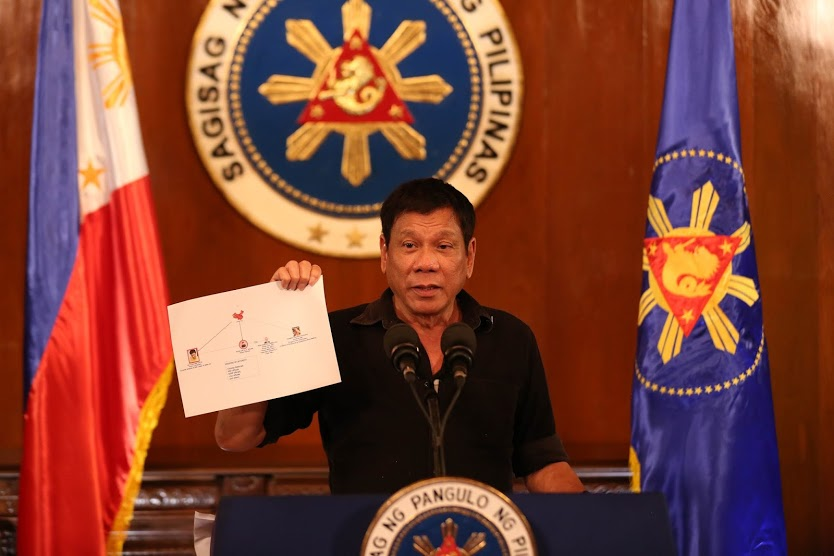
- Duterte shows a diagram of drug syndicates at a press conference on July 7, 2016.
- Date: July 1, 2016 – present (10 years, 4 months and 16 days)
- Location: Philippines
- Result: Arrest of Rodrigo Duterte based on a warrant issued by the International Criminal Court accusing him of crimes against humanity

Parties
(Philippines) Philippine government; National Police; ICAD; PDEA; NBI; Armed Forces; BOC; DOJ; AMLC; Coast Guard; BJMP; Non-state participants, armed organizations: CPP-NPA (until August 2016) (Note: The Communist Party of the Philippines (CPP) and its armed wing the New People's Army (NPA), initially cooperated with the government but withdrew its support for the government's campaign against drugs in August 2016. The CPP has vowed to continue operations, independent from the government's anti-drug campaign, against drug suspects.); MILF; Vigilantes; Davao Death Squad; Hired hitmen; Foreign support: (Note: Foreign support towards the campaign against illegal drugs includes intelligence sharing, training of Filipino law enforcement officers, and financial aid explicitly meant for such purposes. Excludes governments which have only expressed verbal, diplomatic support, and pledges that have yet to be realized.); China (intelligence and financial support); Singapore (intelligence support); United States (financial support)	Philippine drug cartels and gangs: Kuratong Baleleng; Waray-Waray gangs; Bahala Na Gang; Sigue Sigue Sputnik; Foreign drug cartels; Sinaloa Cartel; Chinese Triads; Colombian drug cartels (allegedly); Jihadist militant and pirate groups; Abu Sayyaf; Masaronay Group; Ninja cops (police officers engaged in the drug trade); Suspected drug users

Lead figures
Bongbong Marcos (since 2022); Rodrigo Duterte (2016–2022); Jose Melencio Nartatez (since 2025); Nicolas Torre (2025); Rommel Marbil (2024–2025); Benjie Acorda (2023–2024); Rodolfo Azurin Jr. (2022–2023); Dionardo Carlos (2021–2022); Guillermo Eleazar (2021); Debold Sinas (2020–2021); Camilo Cascolan (2020); Archie Gamboa (2019–2020); Oscar Albayalde (2018–2019); Ronald dela Rosa (2016–2018); Isidro Lapeña (2016–2017); Aaron N. Aquino (2017–2020); Wilkins M. Villanueva (2020–2022); Moro Virgilio M. Lazo (since 2022); Leni Robredo (2019)	

Casualties and losses
312 killed and 974 wounded (as of June 2022)	6,229 killed in official anti-drug operations (as of March 30, 2022)
- 20,000–30,000 civilians killed

Casualties
- Arrested: 327,039 (as of March 30, 2022)

The Philippine drug war, also referred to as the Philippine war on drugs, is the intensified anti-drug campaign initiated during the administration of Rodrigo Duterte, who served as President of the Philippines from June 30, 2016, to June 30, 2022. By February 2022, the Philippine Drug Enforcement Agency (PDEA) reported that out of 42,000 barangays; 24,000 were declared "drug-free", it has been marred by extrajudicial killings (EJK) allegedly perpetrated by the police and unknown assailants. By 2022, the number of drug suspects killed since 2016 was officially tallied by the government as totaling 6,252; human rights organizations and academics, however, estimate that 12,000 to 30,000 civilians have been killed in the "anti-drug operations" carried out by the Philippine National Police and vigilantes.

Prior to his presidency, Duterte cautioned that the Philippines was at risk of becoming a narco-state and vowed that his government's fight against illegal drugs would be relentless. He urged the public to kill drug addicts. The anti-narcotics campaign has been condemned by media organizations and human rights groups, which reported staged crime scenes where police allegedly executed unarmed drug suspects, planting guns and drugs as evidence. Philippine authorities have denied misconduct by police.

Duterte has since admitted to underestimating the illegal drug problem when he promised to rid the country of illegal drugs within six months of his presidency, citing border control difficulties against the entry of illegal drugs due to the country's long coastline, and lamenting government officials' and law enforcers' involvement in the drug trade.

In 2022, Duterte urged his successor, Bongbong Marcos, who won the 2022 Philippine presidential election, to continue the war on drugs in "his own way" to protect the youth. Marcos declared his intention to continue the anti-narcotics campaign, but focusing more on prevention and rehabilitation. In 2024, Marcos emphasized that his administration has been following the "8 Es" for an effective strategy against illegal drugs, and that "Extermination was never one of them". Duterte later stated that Marcos's "bloodless" drug war was due to Marcos's privileged background.

Amidst congressional inquiries in 2024 into the drug war, critics began to allege that the campaign was largely used as a front ("grand budol") to benefit a drug syndicate in Davao City connected to Duterte aimed at eliminating its competition. On March 11, 2025, Duterte was arrested by police authorities based on a warrant issued by the International Criminal Court (ICC) accusing him of crimes against humanity for his central role in the drug war; he was extradited to The Hague on the same day. In the same month, Justice Secretary Jesus Crispin Remulla admitted that the justice system in the Philippines failed the EJK victims of the drug war during Duterte's presidency.

In June 2025, newly-installed PNP chief Nicolas Torre made a courtesy visit to the Commission on Human Rights and affirmed its new oversight function over the police agency regarding adherence to human rights.

== Background ==
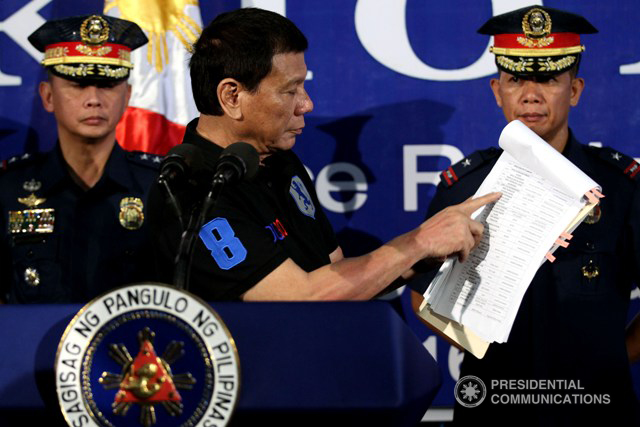
President Duterte showing list of drug syndicates in Butuan City in October 2016

Owing to its geographical location, international drug syndicates use the Philippines as a transit hub for the illegal drug trade. Some local drug syndicates and gangs are also involved in narcotics, utilizing drug mules to transport small amounts of illegal drugs to other countries. In the '90s, the Philippines became a temporary theatre of the U.S.-led war on drugs; at one point the Drug Enforcement Administration conducted their own operations in the country. The new millennium saw a boom in the illegal drug industry. In 2010 alone, a U.S. International Narcotics Control Strategy report estimated the illegal drug trade in the Philippines at $6.4 to $8.4 billion annually.

The perceived growth of illegal drugs in the Philippines led to the nomination of Rodrigo Duterte in the 2016 presidential election, owing to his time as mayor in Davao City, which was allegedly the 9th "safest city in the world" according to the non-peer-reviewed crowd-sourced rating site Numbeo. Numbeo has been criticized for inaccuracy, disinformation and being prone to manipulation, as in reality the highest number of violent incidents in the Philippines occurred in the Davao Region, with Davao City alone making up 45% of the cases in the region.

Duterte won the 2016 Philippine presidential election while promising to kill tens of thousands of criminals, with a platform that urged people to kill drug addicts. Duterte benefited from reports in the national media that he made Davao into one of the world's safest cities, which he in turn cited as justification for his drug policy, even while national police data showed that the city has had the highest murder rate and the second highest rape rate in the Philippines.

As Mayor of Davao City, Duterte was criticized by groups such as Human Rights Watch for the extrajudicial killing of hundreds of street children, petty criminals and drug users carried out by the Davao Death Squad, a vigilante group with which he was allegedly involved. Duterte has alternately confirmed and denied his involvement in the alleged Davao Death Squad killings. Cases of extrajudicial killings have long since been a problem in the Philippines even before the Duterte administration. In a research report for The Asia Foundation conducted by lawyer Al A. Parreno on the grim tradition of police executions, there had been a total of 305 incidents of extrajudicial killings with 390 victims in the country from 2001 to 2010, with only a total of 161 cases or 56% of the incidents filed for prosecution. Parreno also concluded that the number of cases could be higher.

Philippine anti-narcotic officials have admitted that Duterte used flawed and exaggerated data to support his claim that the Philippines is becoming a "narco-state". The Philippines has a low prevalence rate of drug users compared to the global average, according to the United Nations Office on Drugs and Crime. In his inaugural State of the Nation Address, Duterte claimed that data from the Philippine Drug Enforcement Agency (PDEA) showed that there were 3 million drug addicts two to three years previous, which he said may have already increased to 3.7 million. However, according to the Philippine Dangerous Drugs Board, the government drug policy-making body, 1.8 million Filipinos used illegal drugs (mostly cannabis) in 2015—the publication year of the latest official survey—a third of whom had used illegal drugs only once in the past 13 months.

== Death toll and disappearances ==
Estimates of the death toll vary. Officially, as of March 2022, 6,229 drug personalities have been killed. News organizations and human rights groups, however, claim the death toll to be over 12,000. The victims included 54 children in the first year. Opposition senators claimed that in 2018 alone over 20,000 had been killed. In February 2018, the International Criminal Court in The Hague announced a "preliminary examination" into killings linked to the Philippine drug war since at least July 1, 2016.

Based on data from the Philippine National Police (PNP) and PDEA from June 2016 to July 2019, 134,583 anti-drug operations were conducted, 193,086 people were arrested, and 5,526 suspects died during police operations. ₱34.75 billion worth of drugs were seized. 421,275 people surrendered under the PNP's Recovery and Wellness Program (219,979 PNP-initiated, 201,296 community center-supported), and 499 Reformation Centers established. On the law enforcement side, there has been 1,286 casualties with 312 dead, according to PNP chief Gen. Rommel Francisco Marbil.

=== Enforced disappearances ===
According to Families of Victims of Involuntary Disappearances (FIND), of the 50 cases of disappearances under the Duterte administration, 24 cases are allegedly linked to Duterte’s war on drugs.

=== Killings beginning 2022 ===
Supporters of the drug war, such as Department of Interior and Local Government (DILG) Secretary Benhur Abalos Jr. and House Speaker Martin Romualdez, said that the campaign under Marcos had been "bloodless". However, the Dahas Project of the Third World Studies Center reported that the drug war killed 342 people in the first year of the Marcos presidency. The following year, from July 2023 to June 2024, the drug war killed 359 people. State forces were responsible for the majority of the killings during both years, according to the Dahas report. In 2022-2023, Davao Del Sur recorded the highest number of deaths related to the drug war, with 53 fatalities. In 2023-2024, Cebu recorded the highest number of similar deaths, totaling 65.

== Major events ==
=== 2016 ===
==== Prelude ====
According to policewoman Royina Garma, in May 2016 President-elect Rodrigo Duterte requested her to find a person who would help him implement the so-called "Davao model", a system used by Duterte to get rid of drug suspects in Davao City during his time as mayor, in a nationwide scale. She was allegedly requested to look for a Philippine National Police officer or an Iglesia ni Cristo member. This led to her endorsing Edilberto Leonardo for the task. This development of the war on drugs would only be publicized in the House of Representatives inquiries of late 2024.

==== Early months ====
On the day of Duterte's inauguration, Philippine National Police chief Roland dela Rosa formalized the nationwide drug war by issuing Command Memorandum Circular No. 16-2016, or Project Double Barrel, a campaign that dela Rosa stated was "really about killings". In speeches made after his inauguration on June 30 of 2016, Duterte urged citizens to kill suspected criminals and drug addicts. He said he would order police to adopt a shoot-to-kill policy and would offer them a bounty for dead suspects. In a speech to the military leadership on July 1, Duterte addressed Communist rebels to "use your kangaroo courts to kill them to speed up the solution to our problem". On July 2, the Communist Party of the Philippines stated that it "reiterates its standing order for the NPA to carry out operations to disarm and arrest the chieftains of the biggest drug syndicates, as well as other criminal syndicates involved in human rights violations and destruction of the environment" after its political wing Bagong Alyansang Makabayan accepted Cabinet posts in the new government. On July 3, the Philippine National Police announced that they had killed 30 alleged drug dealers since Duterte was sworn in as president on June 30. They later stated they had killed 103 suspects between May 10 and July 7. On July 9, a spokesperson of the president told critics to show proof that there had been human rights violations in the drug war. Later that day, the Moro Islamic Liberation Front announced it was open to collaborate with police in the drug war. On August 3, Duterte said that the Sinaloa cartel and the Chinese triad are involved in the drug trade in the Philippines. On August 7, Duterte named more than 150 drug suspects, including local politicians, police, judges, and military personnel. On August 8, the United States expressed concern over the extrajudicial killings.

A presidential spokesperson said that Duterte welcomed a proposed congressional investigation into the extrajudicial killings to be chaired by Senator Leila de Lima, his chief critic in the government. On August 17, however, Duterte announced that de Lima had been having an affair with a married man, her driver, Ronnie Palisoc Dayan. Duterte claimed that Dayan was her collector for drug money and had also himself been using drugs. In a news conference on August 21, Duterte announced that he had in his possession wiretaps and ATM records that confirmed his allegations. He stated: "What is really crucial here is that because of her [romantic] relationship with her driver which I termed 'immoral' because the driver has a family and wife, that connection gave rise to the corruption of what was happening inside the national penitentiary." Dismissing fears for Dayan's safety, he added, "As the President, I got this information … as a privilege. But I am not required to prove it in court. That is somebody else's business. My job is to protect public interest. She's lying through her teeth." He explained that he had acquired the new evidence from an unnamed foreign country.

On August 18, United Nations human rights experts called on the Philippines to halt extrajudicial killings. Agnes Callamard, the UN Special Rapporteur on summary executions, stated that Duterte had given a "license to kill" to his citizens by encouraging them to kill. In response, Duterte threatened to withdraw from the UN and form a separate group with African nations and China. Presidential spokesperson Ernesto Abella later clarified that the Philippines was not leaving the UN. As the official death toll reached 1,800, a congressional investigation of the killings chaired by de Lima was opened.

Then Presidential spokesperson Harry Roque stated that the government would be open to subjecting the Philippines to a probe through regular domestic channels, as long as they were competent and an unbiased rapporteur on the anti-drug campaign.

On August 23, Chito Gascon, head of the Philippine Commission on Human Rights, told the Senate committee that the International Criminal Court may have jurisdiction over the mass killings. On August 25, Duterte released a "drug matrix" that supposedly linked government officials, including de Lima, to the New Bilibid Prison drug trafficking scandal. De Lima stated that the "drug matrix" was like something drawn by a 12-year-old child. She added, "I will not dignify any further this so-called 'drug matrix', which any ordinary lawyer knows too well properly belongs in the garbage can." On August 29, Duterte called on de Lima to resign and "hang herself".

On August 25, urban poor organization Kadamay held a rally to protest the drug-war killings, particularly the killing of 5-year-old Danica May Garcia.

==== State of emergency ====
On September 3, 2016, following the September 2 bombing in Davao City that killed 14 people in the city's central business district, Duterte declared a "state of lawlessness", and on the following day signed a declaration of a "state of national emergency on account of lawless violence in Mindanao". The Armed Forces of the Philippines and the Philippine National Police were ordered to "suppress all forms of lawless violence in Mindanao" and to "prevent lawless violence from spreading and escalating elsewhere". Executive Secretary Salvador Medialdea said that the declaration "does not specify the imposition of curfews", and would remain in force indefinitely. He explained: "The recent incidents, the escape of terrorists from prisons, the beheadings, then eventually what happened in Davao. That was the basis." According to Huffington Post, the state of emergency was seen by government critics as an attempt by Duterte to "enhance his already strong hold on power and give him carte blanche to impose further measures" in the drug war.

Short clip of Duterte uttering an expletive when U.S. president Barack Obama planned to discuss the killings in the country

At the 2016 ASEAN Summit, US President Barack Obama cancelled scheduled meetings with Duterte to discuss extrajudicial killings after Duterte referred to Obama as a "son of a whore."

==== Senate committee ====
On September 19, 2016, in a motion brought by senator and boxer Manny Pacquiao, the Senate voted 16–4 to remove de Lima from her position as head of the Senate committee investigating the extrajudicial killings. Duterte's allies in the Senate argued that de Lima had damaged the country's reputation by allowing the testimony of Edgar Matobato. She was replaced by Senator Dick Gordon, then a supporter of Duterte. Matobato had testified that while working for the Davao Death Squad he had killed more than 50 people. He said that he witnessed Duterte killing a government agent and had heard Duterte giving orders to carry out executions and ordering the bombing of mosques in retaliation for an attack on a cathedral.

Duterte told reporters that he wanted "a little extension of maybe another six months" for the drug war, as there were so many drug offenders and criminals that he "cannot kill them all". On the following day, a convicted bank robber and two former prison officials testified that they had paid bribes to de Lima, allegations which the senator denied. In a speech on September 20, Duterte promised to protect police in the drug war and urged them to kill drug suspects regardless of whether these latter would draw guns or not during the conduct of the police operations.

At the beginning of October, a senior police officer told The Guardian that 10 "special ops" official police death squads had been operating, each consisting of 15 police officers. The officer said that he had personally been involved in killing 87 suspects, and described how the corpses had their heads wrapped in masking tape with a cardboard placard labelling them as drug offenders so that the killing would not be investigated, and how they were dumped on roadsides (in Philippine English, as "salvage" victims). The chairman of the Philippines' Commission on Human Rights, Chito Gascon, was quoted in the report as saying: "I am not surprised, I have heard of this." The PNP declined to comment. The report stated: "although the Guardian can verify the policeman's rank and his service history, there is no independent, official confirmation for the allegations of state complicity and police coordination in mass murder."

On October 28, Datu Saudi Ampatuan mayor Samsudin Dimaukom and nine others, including his five bodyguards, were killed during an anti-illegal drug operation in Makilala, Cotabato. According to police, the group were heavily armed and opened fire on police, who found sachets of methamphetamine at the scene. No police were injured. Dimaukom was among those named by Duterte on his "drug list" on August 7; the mayor had immediately surrendered after his implication and then returned to Datu Saudi Ampatuan after being let go.

On November 1, it was reported that the US State Department had halted the sale of 26,000 assault rifles to the PNP after opposition from the Senate Foreign Relations Committee due to concerns about human rights violations. A PNP spokesman said they had not been informed. PNP Chief Ronald dela Rosa suggested China as a possible alternative supplier. On November 7, Duterte reacted to the US decision to halt the sale by announcing that he was "ordering its cancellation".

In the early morning of November 5, Mayor of Albuera, Rolando Espinosa Sr., who had been detained at the Baybay City Sub-Provincial Jail for violation of the Comprehensive Dangerous Drugs Act of 2002, was killed in what was described as a shootout inside his jail cell with personnel from the Criminal Investigation and Detection Group (CIDG). According to the CIDG, Espinosa opened fire on police agents who were executing a search warrant for "illegal firearms." A hard drive of CCTV footage that may have contained recorded data of the shooting of Espinosa went missing, a provincial official said. Espinosa had turned himself in to the PNP after being named by Duterte as one of the personalities in his drug list in August. He was briefly released but then re-arrested for alleged drug possession. The president of the National Union of People's Lawyers, Edre Olalia, told local broadcaster TV5 that the police's version of events was "too contrived". He pointed out that a search warrant is not required to search a jail cell. "Such acts make a mockery of the law, taunt impunity and insult ordinary common sense," he said. Espinosa was the second public official to be killed in the drug war.

On the same day, following the incident, Senator Panfilo Lacson sought to resume the investigation of extrajudicial killings after it was suspended on October 3 by the Senate Committee on Justice and Human Rights.

On November 28, Duterte appeared to threaten that human rights workers would be targeted: "The human rights [defenders] say I kill. If I say: 'Okay, I'll stop'. They [drug users] will multiply. When harvest time comes, there will be more of them who will die. Then I will include you among them because you let them multiply." Amnesty International Philippines stated that Duterte was "inciting hate towards anyone who expresses dissent on his war against drugs." The National Alliance against Killings Philippines criticized Duterte's stated belief that human rights are a part of the illegal drug problem, saying his threats constitute "a declaration of an open season on human rights defenders".

On December 5, Reuters reported that of the drug suspects shot by police, 97% of them died, far more than in other countries with drug-related violence. The news agency also stated that PNP reports on these killings are "remarkably similar", almost always involving a "buy-bust" operation in which the suspect panics and shoots at the officers, who return fire, killing the suspect, and then report finding a packet of white powder and a .38 caliber revolver, often with the serial number removed. "The figures pose a powerful challenge to the official narrative that the Philippines police are only killing drug suspects in self-defense. These statistics and other evidence amassed by Reuters point in the other direction: that police are pro-actively gunning down suspects."

On December 8, the Senate Committee on Justice and Human Rights issued a report stating there was no sufficient evidence to prove the existence of a Davao Death Squad, and no proof of an imposed state-sponsored policy to commit killings "to eradicate illegal drugs in the country". Eleven senators signed the report, while senators Leila de Lima, JV Ejercito, Antonio Trillanes and Senate Minority Leader Ralph Recto did not sign the report or did not subscribe to its findings.

==== 2016 New Bilibid Prison riot ====
On the early morning of September 28, 2016, a riot erupted inside Building 14 of the New Bilibid Prison. Initial reports from acting Bureau of Corrections director Rolando Asuncion stated that one inmate witnessed three other convicts, namely Peter Co, Tony Co and Vicente Sy, using methamphetamine moments before the riot started. The inmate alerted former police officer Clarence Dongail, who then entered the cell and told the three to stop. Upon returning to the common area to watch TV, Tony Co attacked Dongail, triggering the riot. Department of Justice Secretary Vitaliano Aguirre II, in his media interview, said that high-profile convict Tony Co was killed after being stabbed. Convict and alleged drug lord Jaybee Sebastian, who was also involved in the riot, Peter Co and Sy were seriously wounded and taken to a hospital; Sebastian was soon in stable condition while Peter Co was announced to be in critical condition. Dongail suffered minimal injuries.

Senator Leila de Lima claimed that the Malacañang Palace was behind the Bilibid riot incident with the aim of persuading the prison's inmates to testify against her for involvement in the alleged drug operations inside the prison. Later, in a press conference, de Lima angrily condemned the incident and challenged Duterte to arrest her.

==== Temporary cessation of police drug operations ====
Following criticism of the police over the kidnapping and killing of Jee Ick-Joo, a South Korean businessman, Duterte ordered the police to suspend drug-related operations while ordering the military and the Philippine Drug Enforcement Agency to take over. Human Rights Watch criticized the South Korean government in May 2018 for continuing to supply materials to the Philippine authorities after the death of Jee Ick-Joo.

=== 2017 ===
On January 4, 2017, a Sputnik gang member by the name of Randy Lizardo shot and killed Police Officer 1 Enrico Domingo in Tondo. Domingo, together with other PNP officers, were conducting a buy-bust operation inside Lizardo's home. As the lawmen burst inside, the gang surprised them from out of the curtains with handguns. Domingo was hit in the head and died instantly, while another, Police Officer 2 Harley Gacera, was wounded in the shoulder. Lizardo and the gang managed to get away, but Lizardo was captured nine days later while attempting to flee the city. The death of Domingo became one of the most covered cases of a police casualty in the drug war.

In March 2017, Duterte issued an executive order creating the Inter-agency Committee on Anti-illegal Drugs (ICAD), composed of 21 government entities headed by the Philippine Drug Enforcement Agency (PDEA), to lead the fight against the illegal drug trade.

==== Amnesty International investigation ====
On January 31, 2017, Amnesty International (AI) published a report of their investigation of 59 drug-related killings in 20 cities and towns, titled "'If you are poor you are killed': Extrajudicial Executions in the Philippines' 'War on Drugs'", which "details how the police have systematically targeted mostly poor and defenceless people across the country while planting 'evidence', recruiting paid killers, stealing from the people they kill and fabricating official incident reports." They stated: "Amnesty International is deeply concerned that the deliberate, widespread and systematic killings of alleged drug offenders, which appear to be planned and organized by the authorities, may constitute crimes against humanity under international law."

The Palace said that the report was wrong, and that there were no such illegal killings, stating: "As for the spate of killings, there is no such thing as state-sponsored since the police has been following the strict protocols in arresting these drug-related criminals." Presidential spokesperson Salvador Panelo said the killings were occurring because the “members of the drug syndicates are killing each other to prevent their competitors from informing the authorities which may lead to their arrest. As for those who were killed by the police, the same were made on the basis of self-defense when they employed unlawful means to resist arrest posing threat to the lives of the police officers."

President Duterte also criticized the double-standard narrative on the killings in the anti-illegal drug campaign. Months after he sat in office, Duterte said, "When you bomb a village, you intend to kill the militants, but you kill in the process the children there. Why do you say it is collateral damage to the West and to us it is murder?"

A police officer with the rank of Senior Police Officer 1, a ten-year veteran of a Metro Manila anti-illegal drugs unit, told AI that police are paid 8,000 pesos (US$161) to 15,000 pesos (US$302) per "encounter" (the term used for extrajudicial executions disguised as legitimate operations); there is no payment for making arrests. He said that some police also receive a payment from the funeral home they send the corpses to. According to two hitmen interviewed by AI, hitmen hired by police are paid 5,000 pesos (US$100) for each drug user killed and 10,000 to 15,000 pesos (US$200–300) for each "drug pusher" killed.

Family members and witnesses repeatedly contested the police description of how people were killed. Police descriptions bore striking similarities from incident to incident; official police reports in several cases documented by Amnesty International claim the suspect's gun “malfunctioned” when he tried to fire at police, after which they shot and killed him. In many instances, the police try to cover up unlawful killings or ensure convictions for those arrested during drug-related operations by planting “evidence” at crime scenes and falsifying incident reports—both practices the police officer said were common.

— Amnesty International report "'If you are poor you are killed': Extrajudicial Executions in the Philippines' 'War on Drugs'"

AI spoke to many witnesses who complained of the dehumanizing treatment of their family members. Crisis Response Director Tirana Hassan stated: "The way dead bodies are treated shows how cheaply human life is regarded by the Philippines police. Covered in blood, they are casually dragged in front of horrified relatives, their heads grazing the ground before being dumped out in the open. The people killed are overwhelmingly drawn from the poorest sections of society and include children, one of them as young as eight years old."

The report makes a series of recommendations addressed to the then-administration of Duterte and his government officials and departments. It also recommends that the International Criminal Court "initiate a preliminary examination into unlawful killings in the Philippines's violent anti-drug campaign and related crimes under the Rome Statute, including the involvement of government officials, irrespective of rank and status" if certain key steps are not going to be swiftly taken by the Duterte government.

The Guardian and Reuters stated that the report added to the evidence they had published previously about police extrajudicial executions. Presidential spokesman Ernesto Abella responded to the report by saying that Philippine Senate committee investigations had proven that there had been no state-sponsored extrajudicial killings. In an interview on February 4, Duterte told a reporter that Amnesty International was "so naive and so stupid", and "a creation of [George] Soros". He asked, "Is that the only thing you [de Lima] can produce? The report of Amnesty?"

De Lima was jailed on February 24, and awaited trial on charges related to allegations made by Duterte in August 2016. A court date was not set.

==== Arturo Lascañas ====
On February 20, Arturo Lascañas, a retired police officer, told reporters at a press conference outside the Philippine Senate building that as a leader of the Davao Death Squad he had carried out extrajudicial killings on the orders of Duterte. He said death squad members were paid 20,000 to 100,000 pesos ($400 to $2,000) per hit, depending on the importance of the target. He gave details of various killings he had carried out on Duterte's orders, including the previously unsolved murder of a radio show host critical of Duterte, and confessed to his involvement with Matobato in the bombing of a mosque on Duterte's orders. On the following day the senate voted in a private session to reopen the investigation, reportedly by a margin of ten votes to eight, with five abstentions.

On March 6, Lascañas gave evidence at the Senate committee hearing, testifying that he had killed approximately 200 criminal suspects, media figures and political opponents on Duterte's orders.

==== Allegations about police using hospitals to hide killings ====
In June 2017 Reuters reported that "Police were sending corpses to hospitals to destroy evidence at crime scenes and hide the fact that they were executing drug suspects." Doctors stated that corpses loaded onto trucks were being dumped at hospitals, sometimes after rigor mortis had already set in, with clearly fatal wounds, the victims having been shot in the chest and head at close range. Reuters examined data from two Manila police districts and found that the proportion of suspects sent to hospitals, where they were pronounced dead on arrival (DOA), increased from 13% in July 2016 to 85% in January 2017. "The totals grew along with international and domestic condemnation of Duterte's campaign," the report added.

PNP Chief dela Rosa dismissed the Reuters report, saying police tried to save the victims’ lives even after encountering violent resistance. He added that police should not be disparaged for trying to save victims and that the removal of bodies from a crime scene did not mean that a proper investigation cannot be carried out.

==== Ozamiz raid, and death of Reynaldo Parojinog ====
On July 30, Reynaldo Parojinog, the mayor of Ozamiz, was killed along with 14 others, including his wife Susan, in a raid at around 2:30 am on his home in barangay Baybay San Roque. According to police, they were serving a search warrant when Parojinog's bodyguards opened fire on them and the police officers responded by shooting back. According to police provincial chief Jaysen De Guzman, the authorities recovered grenades, ammunition and illegal drugs in the raid.

==== "One-time, big-time" operations ====
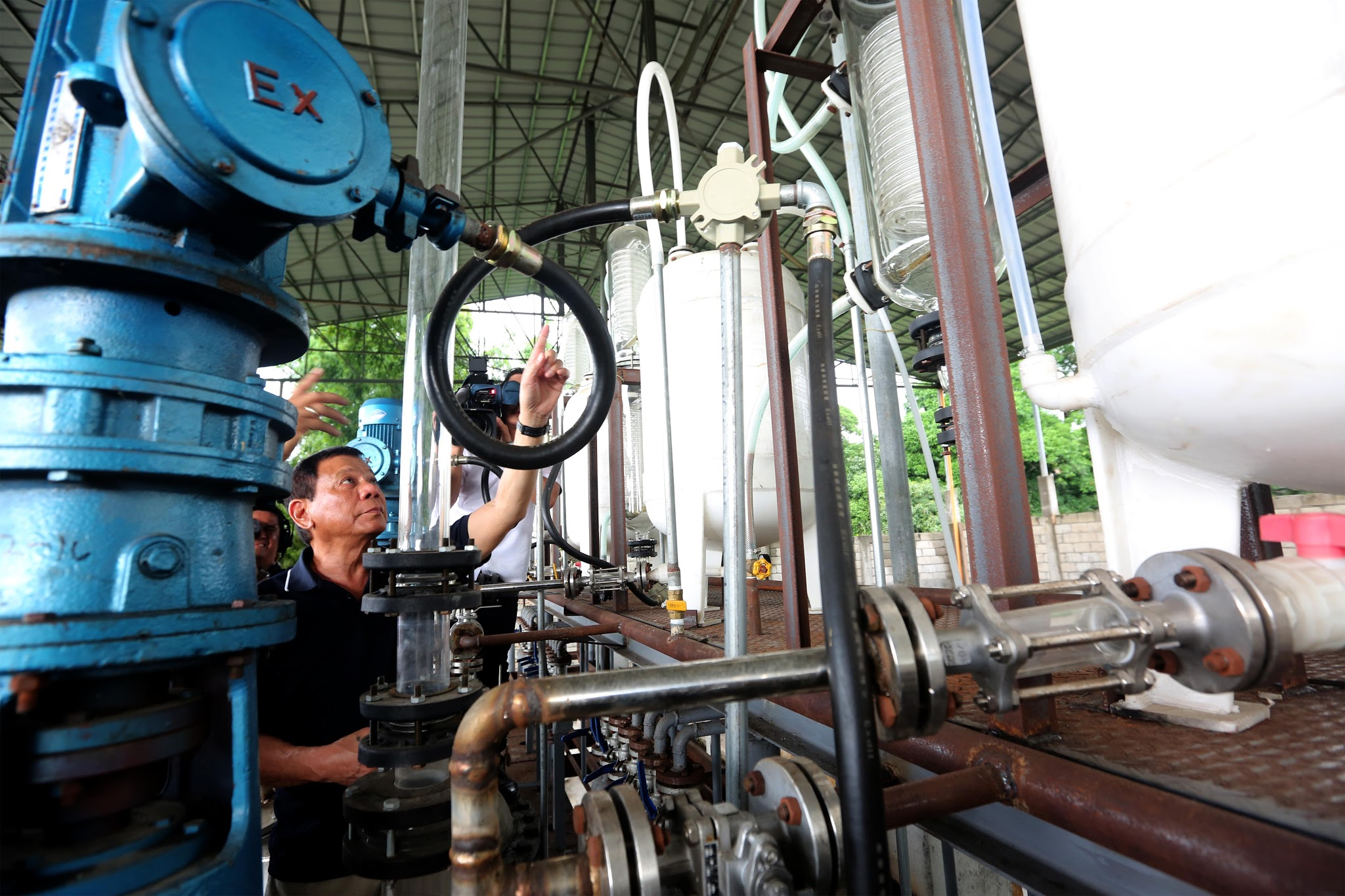
Duterte leads the inspection of the seized shabu laboratory in Arayat, Pampanga in September 2017.

On August 16, over 32 people were killed in multiple "one-time, big-time" antidrug operations in Bulacan. In Manila, 25 people, including 11 suspected robbers, were also killed in consecutive anti-criminality operations. The multiple deaths within that one day in the large-scale antidrug operations received condemnation from human rights groups and the majority of the Senate.

==== Reshuffling of the Caloocan City Police ====
As a result of their involvement in the deaths of teenagers Kian delos Santos, Carl Angelo Arnaiz and Reynaldo de Guzman, and in robbing a drug suspect during an antidrug raid, then National Capital Region Police Office (NCRPO) chief Oscar Albayalde ordered the firing and retraining of all the members of the Caloocan City Police, with the exception of its newly appointed chief and deputy.

==== Transfer of anti-drug operations to PDEA ====
On October 12, 2017, Duterte announced the transfer of anti-drug operations to the PDEA, ending the involvement of the PNP. The announcement followed the publication of an opinion poll on October 8, which showed a drop in the president's approval rating from 66% to 48%. In a televised speech, Duterte scoffed and mocked the "bleeding hearts" who sympathized with those killed in the drug war, pointedly at the European Union, whom he accused of interfering with Philippine sovereignty.

==== Rodrigo Duterte's refutation to ASEAN representatives ====
In a speech before ASEAN representatives, Duterte refuted all extrajudicial killings related to the Philippine war on drugs by stating that these stories only served a political agenda to demonize him. He stated that he only used his mouth to tell drug users they will be killed. He stated that "shabu" (crystal meth) users have shrunken brains, which is why they become violent and aggressive, "leading to their deaths." Duterte added that all drug pushers and their henchmen always carry their guns with them and that killing them is justifiable as to not endanger the lives of policemen. He appointed a human rights lawyer, Harry Roque, a Kabayan party-list representative, as his spokesperson. Roque stated that he will change public perception by reducing the impact of the President's statements advocating for extrajudicial killings in his war on drugs.

=== 2018 ===
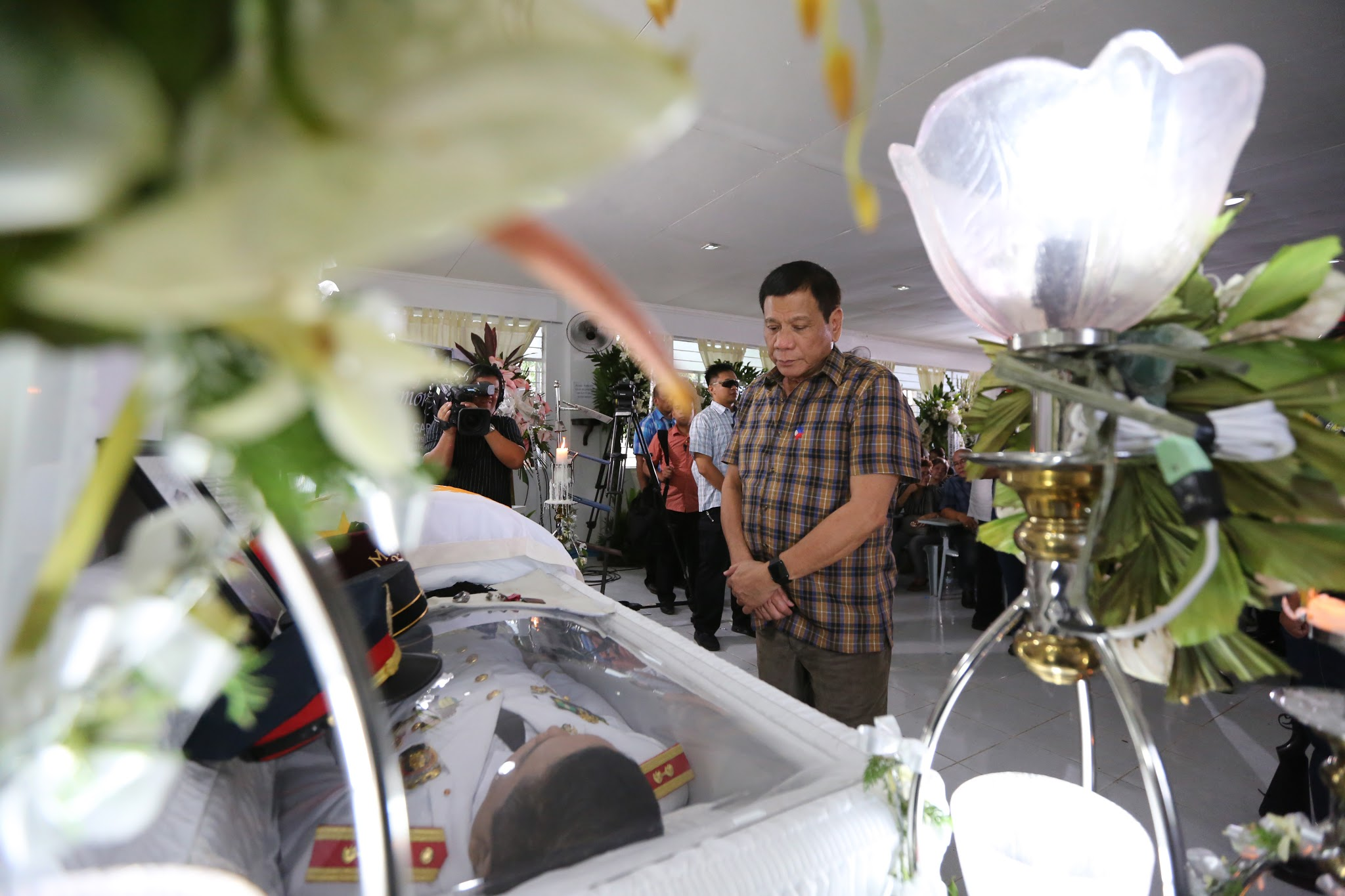
President Duterte visits the wake of Police Senior Inspector Mark Gil Garcia, who was killed in a drug buy-bust operation, at the Rizal Police Provincial Office.

In a speech on March 26, 2018, Duterte stated that human rights groups "have become unwitting tools of drug lords." Human Rights Watch rejected the claim, calling it "shockingly dangerous and shameful."

In October 2018, Duterte signed an executive order institutionalizing the Philippine Anti-Illegal Drugs Strategy, which prescribes a more balanced government approach in the fight against illegal drugs by directing all government departments and agencies, government-owned and controlled corporations, and state universities and colleges to craft their own plans relative to the strategy.

==== Consecutive assassinations of local government officials ====
The controversial Tanauan, Batangas mayor Antonio Halili was assassinated by an unknown sniper during a flag-raising ceremony on July 2, 2018, becoming the 11th local government official to be killed in the drug war. On the following day, Ferdinand Bote, mayor of General Tinio, was shot dead in his vehicle in Cabanatuan.

==== Supreme Court issuance of writs of amparo ====
After holding deliberations on petitions by the Free Legal Assistance Group and the Center for International Law, the Philippine Supreme Court in December 2017 ordered the solicitor-general to release documents related to the drug war. In January 2018, the Supreme Court granted the petitioners a writ of amparo and issued restraining orders against police officers. The spokesperson for the President said the administration would comply with the order.

The Supreme Court issued a second writ of amparo in February 2018, prohibiting the then Interior Secretary, Ismael Sueno, and police chief dela Rosa from going within one kilometer from the widow of a drug war victim killed in Antipolo, Rizal.

=== 2019 ===
A survey conducted by SWS from December 16–19, 2018, showed that 66% of Filipinos believe that drug addicts in the country have diminished substantially.

However, on March 1, 2019, results were released of an SWS survey also conducted from December 16 to 19, 2018, also on 1,440 adults nationwide, which concluded that 78% (or almost 4 out of 5 Filipinos) were worried "that they, or someone they know, will be a victim of extrajudicial killings (EJK)." Police General Oscar Albayalde, the new Philippine National Police chief, criticized the survey results, pointing out that the survey wrongly presented a question that "cannot be validated by respondents without keen awareness or understanding of EJK as we know it from Administrative Order No. 35 Series of 2012 by President [Benigno Simeon] Aquino [III]." He reiterated that "I take the latest survey results on public perception to alleged extrajudicial killing with a full cup of salt. It shouldn't be surprising that 78 percent are afraid of getting killed. Who isn't afraid to die, anyway?"

On March 14, Duterte released another list of politicians allegedly involved in the illegal drug trade. The list consisted of 45 incumbent officials: 33 mayors, eight vice mayors, three Congress representatives, one provincial board member, and one former mayor. Of all the politicians named, eight belonged to Duterte's own PDP–Laban political party. Opposition figures, such as senatorial candidates from Otso Diretso, said Duterte was using the list "to ensure their allies would win" in the May 2019 election.

On March 17, the country formally withdrew from the ICC after the country's withdrawal notification was received by the Secretary-General of the United Nations the previous year. The Republic of the Philippines announced its withdrawal from the Court on March 17, 2019. On July 18, 2023, the Appeals Chamber of the ICC confirmed the Office of the Prosecutor's recommencement of its investigation of the extrajudicial killings in the Philippine "war on drugs". Amid questions relating to jurisdiction following the Philippines' withdrawal from the ICC, the Philippine Supreme Court stated in a 2021 ruling that the country still has an obligation to cooperate in the ICC proceedings.

In September 2019, Philippine authorities accused Guia Gomez-Castro, former chair of Barangay 484 in Sampaloc, Manila, as a mastermind in the "recycling" of illegal drugs law enforcers have seized. Dubbed by the authorities as a "drug queen", the PDEA added that the corrupt police officers involved had been selling Gomez-Castro's "recycled" shabu, worth ₱16.6 million, as Gomez-Castro's cohorts and that Gomez-Castro had the protection of the police officers and other politicians. On September 25, the Bureau of Immigration (BI) announced that Gomez-Castro had left the country on September 21. On the same day, Manila Mayor Isko Moreno, through Facebook live streaming, urged Gomez-Castro to surrender.

Prior to this, in November 2013, the NBI raided the house of Gomez-Castro in Barangay 484, Sampaloc, Manila, where they seized a ₱240,000-worth shabu haul. In November 2018, seven people were arrested by Tondo police during a drug operation; some of them were the chairwoman's relatives. In a text message, Castro denied the accusations against her.

On October 25, 2019, Clarin, Misamis Occidental mayor David Navarro, one of the mayors Duterte named as being involved in the illegal drug trade, was shot dead by four masked men while being transported to the prosecutor's office in Cebu City following his alleged beating of a massage therapist. Prior to his death, Cebu City police said that, according to Navarro's family, the mayor had been receiving death threats in Misamis Occidental.

The Philippines was deemed the 4th most dangerous country in the world in terms of civilian-targeted violence by a mid-2019 report by the Armed Conflict Location & Event Data Project (Acled). The report declared that 75% of the reported deaths in the country were from the war on drugs pursued by the Philippines' authorities.

==== Ninja cops controversy ====
In October 2019, PNP Chief Albayalde became the center of a controversy when he was accused of protecting so-called "ninja cops" or corrupt police officials. The "ninja cops" moniker refers to police officers who had been accused of "recycling" the illegal drugs they seized during their raids and sting operations.

On November 29, 2013, twelve police officers, led by Major Rodney Baloyo, conducted a raid in Mexico, Pampanga, and seized a 36.68 kg (80.9 lb) methamphetamine (shabu) load. Albayalde was the acting police chief of Pampanga at the time of the raid. The operation supposedly had the objective of seizing Chinese drug lord Johnson Lee, who nevertheless evaded arrest after allegedly bribing the police. The next day, on November 30, the authorities submitted the illegal drugs that they recovered as evidence. In 2019, Albayalde was accused of covering up the issue around the bribing allegation; he was also alleged to have benefited from the selling of the seized contraband. Albayalde denied the accusations.

The Makabayan bloc demanded the immediate resignation of Albayalde from his post and other officials from theirs. On October 14, Albayalde eventually resigned as the PNP chief, and Duterte expressed his disappointment over the issue.

On October 21, 2019, the PNP-CIDG filed a complaint before the Department of Justice against Albayalde and 13 of his personnel, citing a reinvestigation of the alleged recycling of around 162 kilograms of shabu that they seized, while the Senate suggested life imprisonment for the police officers. The PNP said in a statement that all the accused should "remain innocent until proven guilty."

==== Robredo's appointment as ICAD co-chairperson ====
On October 23, 2019, Vice President Leni Robredo made a statement, saying Duterte should allow the United Nations to investigate the war on drugs, adding that the campaign had been "a failure and a dent on the country's international image." Presidential spokesman Salvador Panelo slammed Robredo's remark, saying her claim "lacked factual basis." However, on October 27, Robredo clarified that she was only suggesting "tweaks" to the campaign and denied she was calling for a stop to the war on drugs.

The Dangerous Drugs Board (DDB) said that the vice president was “misled in understanding the anti-drug campaign,” adding that law enforcement is only a part of a multi-faceted dimension in addressing domestic drug issues that uses a holistic, balanced, and comprehensive approach. “While enforcement issues are more evident, we cannot discount the successes we have gained in the demand reduction part of the campaign," the DDB said. Presidential spokesperson Panelo, meanwhile, tagged Robredo's comments as “black propaganda”, as they lacked factual basis and advised the Vice President to detach herself from detractors. Panelo said that while the government is not intolerant of criticisms, Robrado's comments “become a disinformation campaign and an abuse of the freedom of speech and expression, and unproductive to the mature evolution of a democratic society, a hindrance to its progress. On November 12, 2019, former Deputy Director of Human Rights Watch's Asia division Phelim Kline made a statement addressed to Robredo, stating his recommendation of arresting Duterte "and his henchmen for inciting and instigating mass murder."

On November 4, 2019, Panelo announced that Duterte had assigned Robredo to be a co-chairperson of the Inter-Agency Committee on Anti-Illegal Drugs (ICAD), effective until the end of his term in 2022. However, on November 24, after Robredo made a number of suggestions, Duterte fired the Vice President from the post. According to Panelo, her removal was "in response to the taunt and dare" of the Vice President for Duterte "to just tell her that he wants her out."

=== 2020 ===
In January 2020, vice president Leni Robredo reported her findings and recommendations on the drug war. Using data from the Philippine National Police and the Philippine Drug Enforcement Agency, Robredo said, "In spite of all the Filipinos who were killed and all the money spent by the government, we only seized less than 1 percent in supply of shabu and money involved in illegal drugs." In December 2020, Rappler reported that "International Criminal Court (ICC) Prosecutor Fatou Bensouda said there is 'reasonable basis' to believe that crimes against humanity were committed in the killings related to President Rodrigo Duterte's war on drugs."

In June of the same year, a shooting in Parañaque left one policeman and one criminal dead, and one policeman wounded. Police Lt. Armand Melad and his group were sent to Unida and Dimasalang streets, Barangay Baclaran, to answer a complaint about loud noises from a karaoke machine. They then came across two males on a motorcycle without helmets. As they questioned the two men, an argument erupted, which led to the policemen to try to arrest the two. One of them, by the name of Moamar Sarif, stepped down from the motorcycle, drew a .40 Jericho Pistol, and opened fire. The police then grabbed their own guns, while the person on the motorcycle drove away. During the shootout, both Melad and Sarif were critically wounded, later dying in the same hospital. Police Corporal Allan Baltazar was also wounded.

August 2020 was the sight of a bloody series of killings in the province of Leyte, in which many drug dealers and users were killed. Jason Golong, a former drug pusher and user, was killed outside of the Remedios Trinidad Romualdez Hospital on Calanipawan Road, shot upon while driving his car. He was the son of former Tacloban City prosecutor Ruperto Golong and was once captured in a buy-bust operation conducted by the PDEA in 2018. Meanwhile, retired police officer and drug user Pio Molabola Peñaflor was killed in a drive-by shooting together with his son Alphy Chan Peñaflor in Palo, Leyte. In the next month, four more people were killed—namely Constantino Torre, Dennis Monteza, Ian Pat Cabredo and Maritess Pami—two of whom were former police officers. Cabredo was a former guard at the Leyte Provincial Jail and was in the police's drug suspect list before his death.

On November 24, Police Captain Ariel Ilagan of the Southern Police District was driving a Toyota Fortuner in Imus, with his family inside the car, when armed assailants on foot ambushed them, firing at the SUV with M16 rifles. The attackers then fled on board a red Toyota Innova that had no registration plate. The shooting was captured on CCTV. Ilagan was killed, while his wife and daughter sustained injuries. Ilagan previously headed the Taguig City Police's Drug Enforcement Unit and had recently been transferred to the Discipline Law and Order Section (DLOS), which handles “administrative and less grave cases” of policemen.

=== 2021 ===
January 23, 2021 saw a major gun battle between the PNP and a Mindanao drug syndicate in Maguindanao. The shootout started when a joint task force of police and Marines personnel attempted to serve a search warrant to Pendatun Adsis Talusan, a former village chief who was convicted of robbery with homicide, double frustrated murder, and illegal possession of firearms. Members of Talusan's group then holed themselves up inside an apartment where the police besieged them. During the end of the firefight, 12 syndicate members including Talusan were killed, as well as one policeman. The shootout happened only a few days after the assassination of Christopher Cuan, mayor of Libungan and a politician included in Duterte's "drug list".

On February 24, Menardo Guevarra, Duterte's second Department of Justice Secretary who had been in the post since 2018, told the press that his department had started investigating alleged police misconduct during the drug war. The DOJ believed the PNP had constantly failed to observe police protocols and ethics, due to the same similar patterns that led to deaths and lack of any ballistics tests or paraffin tests. Findings from the investigation would be forwarded to Human Rights Watch, and HRW in turn urged the DOJ to keep its promise "regarding the alleged failures of the police force in its anti-drug operations." In the same month, Leila de Lima, one of Duterte's long-time critics, was acquitted of one of the three drug charges filed against her.

In the evening of the same day, a fatal friendly fire incident happened between PNP personnel and PDEA agents near a mall in Quezon City. Both organizations were conducting separate drug operations that intertwined in the area near the Ever Gotesco Mall. A botched buy-bust operation then led to a shootout between the two groups that caused the deaths of two policemen, two PDEA agents, and one PDEA informant. Although the shootout happened near a crowded area, mall management managed to secure the civilians in the mall. During the preliminary investigation, the PNP claimed that the PDEA agents fired first. The PNP and the PDEA decided to have a joint investigation on the matter, while Police General Debold Sinas appointed the CIDG as the lead investigating body. The Department of Justice also ordered the National Bureau of Investigation to create a parallel investigation on the matter.

In June, the International Criminal Court Office of the Prosecutor applied for authorization to open an investigation into the alleged crimes against humanity committed in President Rodrigo Duterte's violent campaign against illegal drugs. It also sought to probe killings committed in Davao City from 2011 to 2016. Prosecutor Fatou Bensouda, whose term was to end a week after the investigation announcement, said a preliminary probe that began in February 2018 determined "that there is a reasonable basis to believe that the crimes against humanity of murder [have been] committed" in the Philippines since Rodrigo Duterte's presidential election win in 2016. Malacañang, through presidential spokesperson Harry Roque, responded to the claims by calling it "legally erroneous." The Philippines cut its ties with the International Criminal Court in 2018 when the Philippine Supreme Court junked petitions that challenged the country's plan to withdraw from the international tribunal. The decision to withdraw was a reaction to the ICC's 2018 preliminary inquiry into accusations that Duterte and other Philippine officials had committed mass murder and crimes against humanity in the course of the drug crackdown.

=== 2022 ===
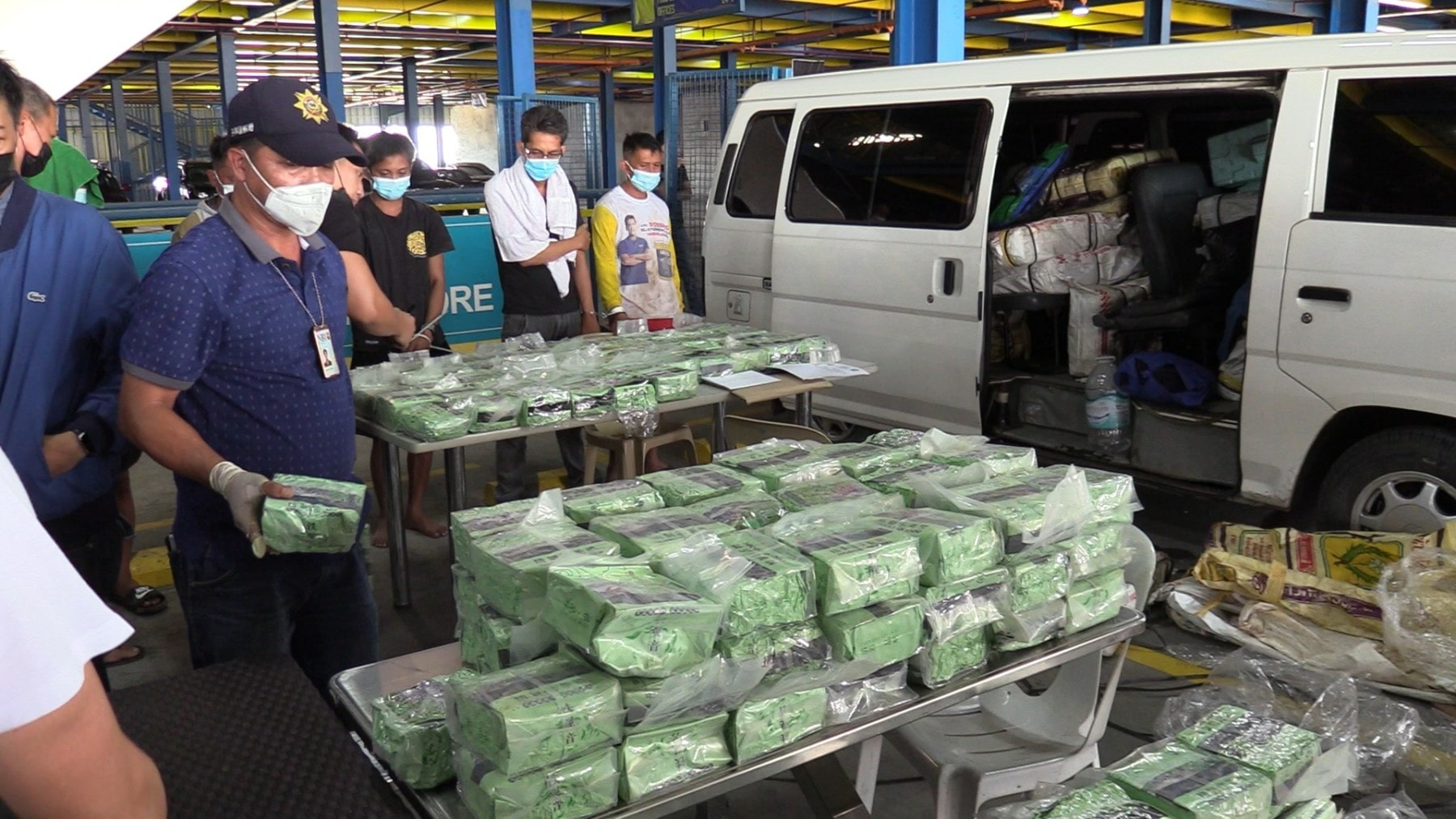
The National Bureau of Investigation presents methamphetamine seized from a March 2022 drug seizure in Infanta, Quezon.

On January 4, 2022, in his first national address of the year, President Duterte said that he would not apologize for the deaths caused by the war on drugs by his administration.

The 2022 Philippine general election took place on May 9. Duterte was limited to only a single six-year term as president and thus was ineligible to participate. Bongbong Marcos was elected as Duterte's successor, with the latter stepping down from his position on June 30. Duterte said he would still pursue his war on drugs even as a civilian after the end of his presidency.

The war on drugs was a major legacy of Duterte's presidency, being a major crackdown on illegal drugs as part of his presidential campaign back in the 2016 elections. By March 31, 2022, 1,130 drug dens and clandestine laboratories had been dismantled, 24,766 of the 42,045 barangays had been cleared of illegal drug influence, 14,888 "high-value targets" were arrested (including 527 government employees), ₱76.17 billion worth of methamnetamine were seized, and 4,307 minors (aged 4–17) had been "rescued" from the illegal drug trade. 6,241 people were killed in the 233,356 anti-illegal drug operations conducted from July 1, 2016, to March 31, 2022.

Duterte expressed willingness to be tried for his role in the war on drugs, but only in domestic courts. He refused to accept being tried by the International Criminal Court.

=== War on drugs under Marcos ===
In mid-2022, then-outgoing President Duterte advised then President-elect Bongbong Marcos to continue the former's campaign against illegal drugs, even if its continuation under Marcos would mean modifications. Marcos considered giving Duterte the role of anti-drug czar under his administration, but the latter expressed disinterest.

Among the first decisions of Marcos relating to his predecessor's campaign was establishing a stance that the Philippines would not be rejoining the International Criminal Court. Under former President Duterte, the country's membership was withdrawn from the international court in 2019 after Duterte was accused of committing crimes against humanity in relation to his campaign against illegal drugs.

Marcos announced a policy shift on the Philippines' campaign against illegal drugs. He said "drug abuse prevention and education and the improvement of rehabilitation centers will be the focus" of his own campaign. Department of the Interior and Local Government (DILG) Secretary Benjamin Abalos Jr. said that the approach of the government under his watch would be to build "airtight cases" against "big-time" drug traffickers to minimize dismissed cases.

Following the arrest of two suspected drug traffickers in separate operations in Talisay and Cebu City on July 30, which led to the seizing of ₱P8.5 million worth of methamphetamine, PNP Police Regional Office 7 chief Roque Eduardo Vega declared that "the drug war continues".

Marcos appointed his first PNP chief on August 1, 2022. The appointee, Rodolfo Azurin Jr., also believed that the war on drugs should be "relentlessly" continued but must be refined to include rehabilitation. He insisted that "killing is not the solution in drug war" and that drug lords should be arrested while communities affected by the illegal drug trade should be developed instead.

In late 2022, Human Rights Watch disputed the claim that a policy shift occurred under Marcos, citing that the PNP was undercounting war on drugs-related deaths instead of relying on data from the Dahas program of the University of the Philippines' Third World Studies Center which tallied 127 deaths from drug war incidents from July 1 to November 7. HRW disagreed with the assessment of the PNP that there were minimal deaths, even if they were to accept the police's death tally of only 46 people. Justice secretary Crispin Remulla was critical of HRW's statements, viewing it as not objective and saying it was influenced by non-government organizations sympathetic to the Communist Party of the Philippines. He insisted that extrajudicial killing is not state policy and that classifying a death arising from an anti-illegal drug operation as extrajudicial killing is wrong and misleading.

Also in November, former police chief and senator Bato dela Rosa filed a bill in the Senate proposing the decriminalization of usage of illegal drugs in a bid to decongest prisons and fill in the underutilized rehabilitation centers. This proposal was met with opposition from law enforcement agencies who believed such a move would send a "wrong signal" to people that drug abuse is alright.

On November 28, the DILG launched its Buhay Ay Ingatan, Droga'y Ayawan (BIDA; lit. 'Protect Life, Refuse Drugs') program separate from the campaign of law enforcement agencies. In coordination with local governments, the Department of Social Welfare and Development (DSWD) and the Department of Health, the DILG's program is focused on illegal drugs demand reduction and rehabilitation.

In December, Dela Rosa called for action believing there was a resurgence of drug syndicates that had come "back with a vengeance", citing two separate buy-bust operations that led to the arrest of police and PDEA agents. Dela Rosa concluded that syndicates had been emboldened to operate anew due to the departure of Duterte. In response, Interior Secretary Benhur Abalos pointed out that ₱10 billion worth of illegal drugs had been seized since the start of the Marcos administration.

In November 2024, the Department of Justice created a task force to conduct a criminal investigation into the EJKs committed in the drug war of President Duterte. It operated under the OSJPS, led by a senior assistant state prosecutor, regional prosecutor and nine National Prosecution Service members. On March 11, 2025, former president Duterte was arrested and sent to The Hague on charges related to crimes against humanity during his "war on drugs", which allegedly resulted in thousands of deaths.

==== Conviction of Caloocan policemen ====
On June 18, 2024, Caloocan Regional Trial Court, Branch 121 Presiding Judge Maria Rowena Violago Alejandria sentenced Police Master Sergeant Virgilio Cervantes and police corporals Arnel de Guzman, Johnston Alacre, and Artemio Saguros for the homicide of father and son Luis and Gabriel Bonifacio during a 2016 anti-drug operation. This marked the fourth conviction of police personnel related to Duterte's drug war, the first being the conviction around the 2018 murders of Kian delos Santos, Carl Arnaiz and Reynaldo de Guzman.

==== Quad Committee of the House of Representatives hearings ====
In August 2024, the Philippine House of Representatives set up a panel to investigate possible links between Philippine Offshore Gaming Operators (POGOs), extrajudicial killings, illegal drugs, and Chinese syndicates. The panel comprised the House's dangerous drugs committee, human rights committee, public accounts committee, and public order and safety committee. The Quad Committee held its first meeting on August 12, and held its first hearing on August 16.

==== Espenido's accusations against Senators Dela Rosa and Go ====
Also in August 2024, Jovie Espenido, a controversial police officer involved in Duterte's war on drugs, testified before the House Committee on Public Order and Safety and accused Senator Ronald dela Rosa of causing the dismissal of cases against drug lords Kerwin Espinosa and Mayor Reynaldo Parojinog. Espenido also accused senator Bong Go of sourcing intelligence funds from POGOs to fund the alleged "reward system" of Duterte's drug war. Both Dela Rosa and Go vehemently denied Espenido's claims.

==== PNP under Nicolas Torre ====
In June 2025, police general Nicolas Torre was installed as the new chief of the PNP, succeeding Rommel Marbil. A week after his appointment, Torre became the first PNP chief to make a courtesy visit to the Commission on Human Rights, where he stated that "The CHR is our boss on the protection of human rights."

== Operations ==
The Philippine National Police manages Oplan Double Barrel as part of its involvement in President Rodrigo Duterte's campaign against illegal drugs in the Philippines. It consists of two main components: Oplan Tokhang and Oplan HVT. Tokhang is characterized as the lower barrel approach while HVT, which stands for high value targets, is described as the police's high barrel approach. The operation was launched in 2016.

The Philippine police temporarily suspended its operations in October 2017 after a directive by President Duterte amidst reports of abuse by the police, with the Philippine Drug Enforcement Agency taking over as the leading agency against illegal drug activities in the country. The police resumed its operations in January 2018, but with the force officially playing a supporting role to PDEA in the campaign.

The latest iteration of Oplan Double Barrel was its Finale edition, which was launched on March 14, 2022. It is also known as the Anti-Illegal Drugs Operations Thru Reinforcement and Education (ADORE) program.

ADORE is still being implemented despite the end of Duterte's presidential term in June 2022, although his successor, President Bongbong Marcos, has indicated a policy shift towards a focus on the rehabilitation of small-time drug users. Deaths still persisted despite this. The PNP policy was placed under review in August 2024.

=== Oplan Tokhang ===
One component of the war on drugs by the administration of President Rodrigo Duterte is Oplan Tokhang, derived from the Cebuano words tuktok (knock) and hangyo (plead). As the name suggests, Oplan Tokhang involves the police visiting the houses of individuals suspected of being involved in the illegal drug trade as dealers or users, to persuade them to stop their activities and submit themselves to authority for potential rehabilitation. A more comprehensive guideline by the Philippine National Police then under the leadership of Police Chief Ronald dela Rosa was released prior to the resumption of police operations on the war on drugs in January 2019 after it was temporarily postponed. Tokhang is characterized as a Police Community Relations operation.

Under its guidelines, in a single operation, four police officers selected by the locality's police chief are designated as tokhangers to visit the suspects' houses in full uniform. They are to be accompanied by one member of the barangay, municipality, or city anti-drug abuse council, one representative from the PNP human-rights affairs office or any human rights advocate and at least one from the religious sector, and members of the media or other prominent personalities in the area. They are only allowed to enter the suspect's house upon the consent of the suspect or the house owner. The police coordinates with the Philippine Drug Enforcement Agency and the local anti-drug abuse councils for the conduct of the operations. The guidelines include the option for drug suspects to surrender themselves to the police or the barangay hall and to avail of rehabilitation. They are not required to sign any document. If the suspect refuses to surrender or engage with the visiting Oplan Tokhang team, their case is to be submitted to the Drug Enforcement Units of the PNP, which will then conduct a relevant police operation against the suspects including case build-up and negation.

The policy was first used in a more local scale in Davao, when Dela Rosa was still the police chief of the locality, leading police visits to drug suspects' houses. The word tokhang has become associated with killings related to the campaign against illegal drugs prior to the release of the guideline, prompting the PDEA chief, General Aaron Aquino, to urge the agency to discontinue the use of the word "tokhang" in reference to the government's operations.

=== Oplan HVT ===
Oplan High Value Targets (HVT) is a component of the Philippine National Police operations under Operation Double Barrel which aims to arrest and neutralize individuals whom the police allege to be involved in the country's illegal drug trade. They include drug lords and pushers who operate in groups. In its November 2016 report, the PNP Directorate for Intelligence said that of the 956 validated high-value targets identified by the national police since the start of the campaign, 23 were killed in police operations, 109 were arrested, and 361 surrendered. This accounts for over 54.6% of the total identified HVTs while another 29 targets were listed as "deaths under investigation". The PNP also reported that at least ₱1.445 billion worth of illegal drugs had been seized in the first four months of their campaign against HVTs.

The high-value targets identified by the national police include Albuera mayor Rolando Espinosa who earlier surrendered to the PNP before being killed in prison, and alleged number 2 Visayas drug lord Franz Sabalones, the brother of San Fernando, Cebu mayor Fralz Sabalones, who surrendered to the PNP after being named by President Duterte in his narco-list speech.

=== PDEA's three-pronged strategy ===
The Philippine Drug Enforcement Agency announced in 2019 that it had adopted a three-pronged strategy to enhance the Philippine government's war on drugs. These three prongs were composed of supply reduction, demand reduction, and harm reduction programs.

During the Duterte Legacy campaign launch in January 2020, PDEA claimed victory of its three-pronged approach, citing its successful activities.

Under supply reduction, PDEA and other law enforcement agencies conducted high-impact operations and arrested high-value targets. Authorities dismantled drug dens and shabu laboratories, seized billions of pesos worth of illegal drugs, and arrested over 200 thousand persons involved in illegal drugs.

Under demand reduction, advocacy campaign activities including lectures, seminars, conferences and film showings were conducted.

Under harm reduction, activities were conducted, including "Balay Silangan", a community-based reform program for surrendering drug offenders; Project "Sagip Batang Solvent", which rescued street children who were hooked on solvent-sniffing; drug-testing of public transportation drivers nationwide; and the establishment of a "Drug-Free Workplace Program" for business establishments.

Although the three-pronged approach by PDEA was only adopted in April 2019, statistics of the above activities cited under victories of the PDEA's three-pronged approach under the Duterte Legacy campaign dated back to June 2016.

== Support of non-state actors ==
Rodrigo Duterte's campaign against illegal drugs was aided by non-government organizations as well as rebel groups and vigilantes. The Communist Party of the Philippines (CPP), and its armed wing, the New People's Army (NPA), initially cooperated with the government but withdrew their support for the government's campaign in August 2016, vowing to continue their own operations against drug suspects.

The Moro Islamic Liberation Front, a rebel group in a truce with the government, forged a protocol with the Republic of the Philippines in July 2017, in which it pledged to arrest and turn over drug suspects taking refuge in the rebel group's camps and that it would allow the government to conduct its anti-drug operations in areas controlled by the group.

Killings by armed vigilantes, motorcycle-riding gunmen, and hired killers had led to accusations that the PNP had been working with these non-state actors during the campaign.

== Youth casualties ==
Children's rights non-governmental organizations reported that there were 101 child fatalities in the drug war from July 2016 through December 2018. Some children had to leave their homes and their family, fearing for their safety. Government authorities called the killings "collateral damage".

On August 23, 2016, a 5-year-old student named Danica May Garcia was killed by a stray bullet coming from unidentified gunmen in Dagupan during an "anti-drug operation". Another minor, 4-year-old Skyler Abatayo of Cebu was killed by a stray bullet from another anti-drug operation. On the same week, a 15-year-old by the name of Angelika Bonita (sometimes spelled "Angelica") was killed while riding inside the Toyota Hilux of 48-year-old narco-lawyer Rogelio Bato Jr., the attorney of Rolando Espinosa. The two were cruising in a subdivision near a mall in Marasbaras, Tacloban when they were fired upon by M16s and .45 caliber guns. Both were killed instantly. Bato and Bonita were not related, and questions surrounded their relationship. Rumors speculated that Bonita was Bato's girlfriend and that she was caught in the crossfire. In the first year of the drug war, 54 children were recorded as casualties.

On August 16, 2017, Kian Loyd delos Santos, a 17-year-old Grade 11 student, was shot dead in an antidrug operation in Caloocan. CCTV footage appeared to show Kian being dragged by two policemen. Police said they killed delos Santos in self-defense and claimed they retrieved a gun and two packets of methamphetamine. Delos Santos was the son of an overseas Filipino worker, a key demographic that supported Duterte. The teenager's death caused condemnation by senators. His funeral on August 25, attended by more than a thousand people, was to that date one of the largest protests against the drug war.

Carl Angelo Arnaiz, a 19-year-old, last found in Cainta, Rizal, was tortured and shot dead on August 17 (one day after delos Santos was killed) by police after allegedly robbing a taxi in Caloocan. His 14-year-old friend, Reynaldo de Guzman, also known by the nickname "Kulot", was stabbed to death thirty times and thrown into a creek in Gapan, Nueva Ecija. The deaths of Arnaiz and de Guzman, along with the death of delos Santos, triggered public outrage and condemnation.

Human Rights Watch repeated their call for a UN investigation. HRW Asia director Phelim Kine commented: "The apparent willingness of Philippine police to deliberately target children for execution marks an appalling new level of depravity in this so-called drug war." Duterte called the deaths of Arnaiz and de Guzman (the former being a relative of the President on his mother's side) "sabotage", claiming some groups were using the Philippine National Police to destroy his public image. Presidential spokesman Abella said, "It should not come as a surprise that these malignant elements would conspire to sabotage the president's campaign to rid the Philippines of illegal drugs and criminality," which "may include creating scenarios stoking public anger against the government."

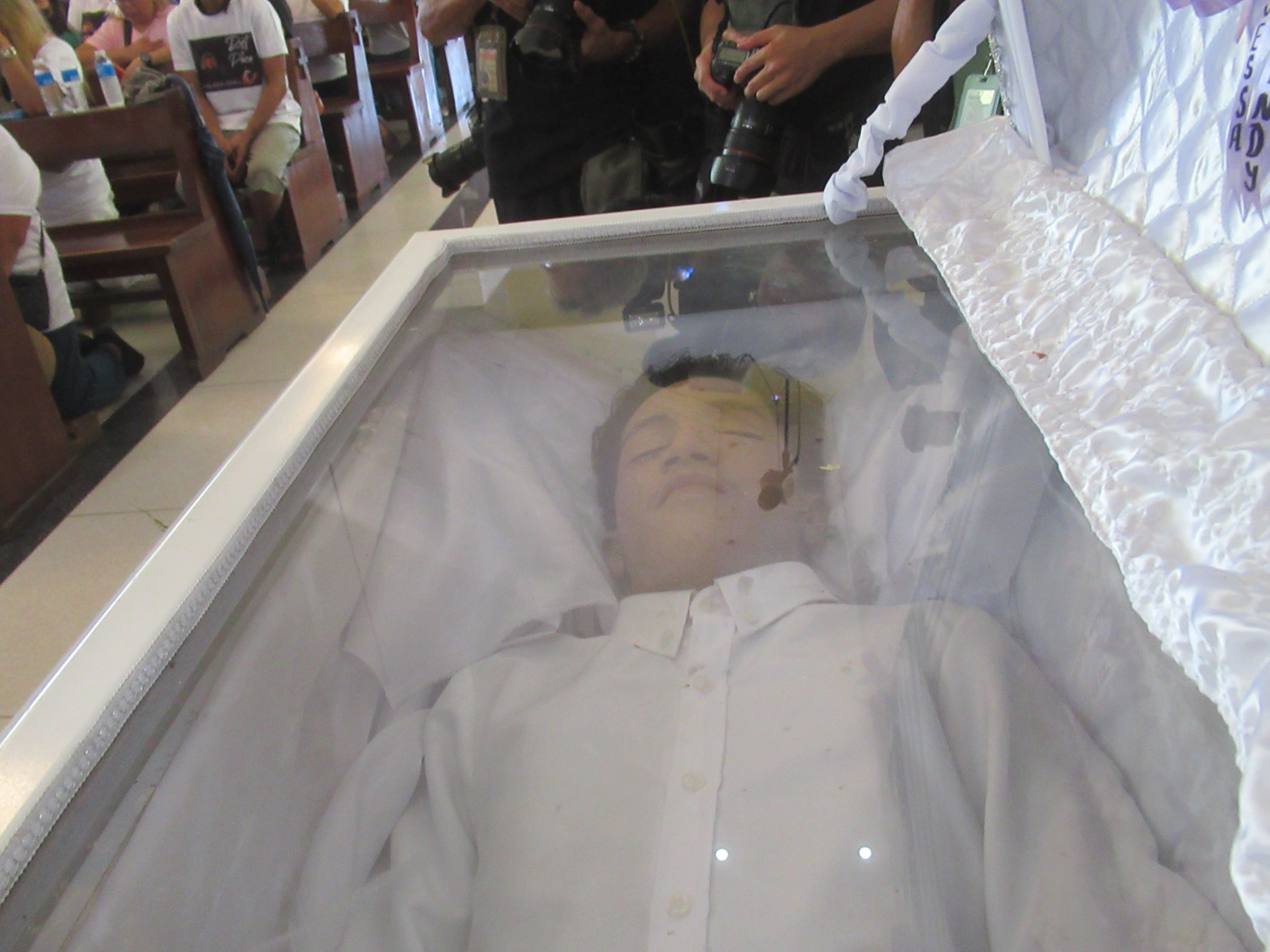
Jerhode Jemboy Baltazar funeral (San Lorenzo Ruiz and Companion Martyrs Parish Church (Navotas City)

Newly seated senator Ronald dela Rosa made a statement about the death of a 3-year-old child named Myka Ulpina who was killed in a crossfire during police operations in Rodriguez, Rizal on June 29, 2019, reacting to the incident by saying, "shit happens". It was alleged that Renato Dolofrina took his 3-year-old daughter hostage and that both were killed by the police after the father used the child as a "human shield." However, the family denied the allegations of hostage taking, insisting that the child was killed by a stray bullet. According to a police report, a police officer went undercover to buy crystal meth from Dolofrina, and that Dolofrina's companion discovered the ruse, prompting Dolofrina to grab his gun. A few days later, several militant groups and netizens, as well as opposition senators, condemned dela Rosa's remarks. The Commission on Human Rights also condemned the child's death. On July 8, 2019, dela Rosa apologized for his remarks and retracted his earlier statement, saying that the incident was "unfortunate."

On August 2, 2023, Jerhode Jemboy Baltazar, mistaken for a murderer, was shot by Navotas policemen in Barangay NBBS Kaunlaran (North Bay Boulevard South). In a 44-page decision promulgated on February 27, 2024, the Navotas Regional Trial Court, Branch 286 convicted Police Staff Sergeant Gerry Maliban of homicide and sentenced him to 4 years, 2 months, and 10 days up to six years, four months, and 20 days in prison and ordered him to pay Baltazar's heirs the sum of ₱50,000 in civil liability and ₱50,000 in moral damages. The court also convicted former Police Executive Master Sergeant Roberto Balais Jr., Police Staff Sergeant Nikko Esquilon, Police Corporal Edmark Jake Blanco, and Patrolman Benedict Mangada for the illegal discharge of firearms, with a sentence of up to 4 months and 1 day of imprisonment; former Police Staff Sergeant Antonio Bugayong was acquitted, noting that there were conflicting accounts about Bugayong firing his gun.

== Accusations of genocide ==
Many observers have compared the mass killings of alleged drug users and dealers to a genocide, and the ICC has opened a case of crimes against humanity. Writing for the Washington Post, Maia Szalavitz argued that the campaign had not had much blowback because drug users are seen by many as worthless members of society and therefore easy targets. In his book Dopeworld, former drug dealer turned author Niko Vorobyov compared the drug war to the stages of annihilation leading to the Holocaust outlined by Raul Hilberg:

- Identification – singling out a group of people as subhuman (Duterte has said meth addicts have shrunken brains).
- Confiscation and concentration – finding a way of taking those people's property before taking themselves away, either to prisons, concentration camps, or to a deportation destination.
- Annihilation – the final solution, where the unwanted people(s) are simply exterminated.

At a press conference on September 30, 2016, Duterte appeared to make a comparison between the drug war and the Holocaust, saying "Hitler massacred three million Jews. Now there are three million drug addicts. I'd be happy to slaughter them." His remarks generated an international outcry; United States Secretary of Defense Ash Carter said the statement was "deeply troubling", and the German government told the Philippine ambassador that Duterte's remarks were "unacceptable". On October 2, Duterte announced, "I apologize profoundly and deeply to the Jewish"; but he explained, "It's not really that I said something wrong but rather they don't really want you to tinker with the memory".

St. John's University visiting professor Daniel Franklin Pilario said he needed to tell the stories of the widows and orphans, and asked theologians what theology they should do after extrajudicial killings, which was the same question the German theologians of the time asked after the Holocaust.

== Stigmatization and discrimination ==
The drug war also contributed to the stigmatization of people who use drugs and people with substance use disorders. In 2024, an analysis of Philippine government documents from the Duterte administration found that official texts variously described people who use drugs as "drug dependents", "offenders", "drug personalities", and "abusers", framing them as a societal problem or "menace". Researchers and human rights groups have argued that this punitive framing can reinforce stigma and discrimination and discourage people with substance use disorders from seeking healthcare. The United Nations reporting has also identified stigma and discrimination, alongside the punitive governmental approach, as factors contributing to inadequate access to treatment, rehabilitation, and harm-reduction services in the Philippines.

== Investigations and reports ==
Investigations on the drug war have been conducted by lawmakers, human rights groups, academic institutions, and the media. Philippine law-enforcement agencies launched #RealNumbersPH on May 2, 2017, to publish data and publicity related to the drug war. In June 2017, its data were described by the Philippine Center for Investigative Journalism as unreal and inexact.

In the Philippine Senate, on August 22, 2016, the Senate committee on justice and human rights opened a Senate inquiry on extrajudicial killings and police operations under the Philippine drug war. After three public hearings, however, on September 19, the Senate ousted Senator Leila de Lima, Duterte's staunchest critic, as chair of the committee leading the investigation and replaced her with Senator Dick Gordon as the new chair.

The International Criminal Court (ICC) announced in February 2018 that it was launching a preliminary inquiry on alleged crimes done during the Philippine drug war.

Philippine Commission on Human Rights conducted investigations into the Philippine drug war. However, its investigations were "hampered by the predilection and uncooperativeness" of Philippine National Police, which denied access to evidence. The PNP cited directives by President Duterte as basis for its refusal to cooperate. In 2022, the Commission on Human Rights stated that the Duterte government "failed in its obligation to respect and protect human rights of every citizen, in particular, victims of drug-related killings."

In August 2024, four committees of House of Representatives (i.e., Dangerous Drugs, Public Order and Safety, Human Rights, and Public Accounts) began hearings on extrajudicial killings allegedly committed as part of the Philippine drug war. By mid-December 2024, the "quad committee" issued a preliminary report claiming that the anti-drug campaign was likely a front that largely benefitted a drug syndicate in Davao City connected to Duterte by eliminating its competition, stating that with the hearings, they have "started to uncover a grand criminal enterprise, and it would seem that at the center of it is former President Duterte."

After Duterte's arrest on March 11, 2025, the House stated that it may turn over drug war evidence to the ICC. On March 17, 2025, Zambales 1st district congressman and quad committee member Jay Khonghun expressed support for the ICC's upcoming trial, hoping that it will bring more evidence regarding their allegation that Duterte's drug war was "a billion-peso business" to benefit a drug syndicate in Davao City and other powerful individuals, which he dubbed a "grand budol" (lit. 'grand swindling').

The Third World Studies Center of University of the Philippines examined different sources to tally drug-related killings under President Duterte through the Dahas Project. The Dahas Project continues to track the killings under President Bongbong Marcos.

== In popular media ==
=== Television and film ===
In 2018, director Brillante Mendoza filmed Alpha: The Right to Kill, which follows themes of poverty, drugs, and corruption in the police force. In the same year, Netflix aired its first series from the Philippines entitled Amo, also made by Mendoza.

The long-running action-drama series Ang Probinsyano has also tackled the issue in its storyline. The show's portrayal of the PNP and its handling of the drug war, however, was criticized by then PNP Chief Oscar Albayalde for its alleged negative portrayal of the force. The PNP at one point also withdrew its support of the show and threatened legal action if the show's storyline was not changed. Netizens, politicians, artists and others, on the other hand, defended the show's depiction of the police force and of the drug war.

On August 1, 2018, the action film BuyBust was released; it similarly tackles the subject of the drug war. The film was released internationally and was an entry to the 2018 New York Asian Film Festival.

Also in 2018, Alyx Ayn Arumpac filmed the documentary Aswang, which frames events related to the drug war, trailing journalists and interviewing people left behind by victims. It premiered at the 2019 International Documentary Film Festival Amsterdam (IDFA) in the Netherlands.

A multi-award-winning joint production by PBS and the BBC, titled On the President's Orders; was first aired in mid-2019; it highlights to audiences in the West the war on drugs in the Philippines. The film was produced and directed by two-time Emmy Award-winning and five-time BAFTA Awards-nominated director James Jones and filmed and co-directed by Emmy Award-winner for cinematography Olivier Sarbil.

=== Music ===
In December 2016, American singer James Taylor posted on social media that he canceled his concert in Manila, which was set for February 2017, citing the increasing number of deaths related to the drug war.

"Hustisya" is a rap song about the drug war, created by a Pasay rap group called One Pro Exclusive. The song was inspired by the death of the group's friend, Micheal Siaron, whose dead body with his grieving partner was immortalized in a photograph often compared to Michelangelo's Pieta.

The 2017 song "Manila Ice" by musician Eyedress, along with its music video, depicts violence and corruption and were created as a response to the Philippine drug war.

In May 2019, the PDEA called for a ban on rapper Shanti Dope's song "Amatz" for allegedly promoting marijuana use, which is illegal in the Philippines. The Concerned Artists of the Philippines criticized the PDEA for the attempt to suppress freedom of expression. In June 2019, the National Telecommunications Commission ordered the Kapisanan ng mga Brodkaster ng Pilipinas (Association of Broadcasters of the Philippines) to stop the airing of the song.

The 2019 rap album Kolateral tells the story of the Philippine drug war through the eyes of the drug war's victims. The album features 12 songs by artists BLKD (pronounced Balakid), Calix, and others.

On December 10, 2019, Irish musician Bono of U2 sent a message to Duterte during his visit to Manila on a concert tour, saying that he "can't compromise on human rights." In a press conference, Bono said that he had been a member of Amnesty International and is "critical" when it comes to human rights. During U2's concert, the band paid tribute to important women in history during the performance of the song "Ultraviolet (Light My Way)" and included women from the Philippines, showing on a large screen pictures of former President Corazon Aquino, Rappler CEO and journalist Maria Ressa, and human rights and social justice activist Lidy Nacpil, among others.

=== Photography ===
La Pieta, or the "Philippines' Pieta", named after the sculpture by Michelangelo, refers to a photograph of Jennilyn Olayres holding the corpse of Michael Siaron, who was shot dead by unidentified assailants in Pasay, Metro Manila, on July 23, 2016. A piece of cardboard with the words "Wag tularan si Siaron dahil pusher umano" (Do not be like Siaron because they say he's a pusher) was placed on his body. The image was widely used in the national press. Malacañang alleged that the killing was committed by drug syndicates themselves. One year and three months after Siaron was killed, the police identified the suspected assailant as Nesty Santiago through a ballistic exam on the recovered firearm. Santiago was allegedly a member of a syndicate involved in robberies, car thefts, hired killings and illegal drugs. The Pasay city police declared Siaron's death as "case closed" since Santiago was himself killed in a drive-by shooting by "riding-in-tandem" assailants on December 29, 2016. No further investigation was made.

On April 11, 2017, The New York Times won a Pulitzer Prize for breaking news photography on their Philippine drug war report. The story was published on December 7, 2016, and was titled "They Are Slaughtering Us Like Animals".

A photo by Noel Celis of a body of an alleged drug dealer killed during a police anti-drug operation in Manila was selected as one of Time magazine's top 100 photos of 2017.

=== Video games ===
The war on drugs became the subject of various video games on mobile platforms where players—as caricatures of Duterte and other government officials—take on criminals through violent means. Many of these games have been removed by Apple Inc. from their App Store in violation of Apple's content guidelines following an appeal by regional organization Asian Network of People Who Use Drugs. Ben Joseph Banta, a managing partner of Ranida Games, denied that their game Tsip Bato glorified violence and maintained that it discourages recreational drug use through the use of anti-drug messages incorporated in the game.

=== Contemporary art ===
In 2016, a group of artists exhibited Everyday Impunity: Ang Mga Walang Pangalan (Everyday Impunity: The Nameless Ones) during the year's Art Fair Philippines. It was curated by Erwin Romulo, with photography by Carlo Gabuco, music by Juan Miguel Sobrepeña, sound system design by Mark Laccay, and lighting design by Lyle Sacris. The exhibit revealed a wall of photographs by Gabuco, taken from his coverage of the Philippine drug war. Central to the exhibit space was a blue sofa, which was revealed to be from a crime scene where a drug suspect was shot. The spectator was invited to sit and hear the suspect's daughter, who talked about her father and their life in Payatas.

A work by muralist Archie Oclos also references the Philippine drug war. His work, entitled Ang Mamatay nang Dahil sa Iyo and displayed at the Cultural Center of the Philippines, shows a dead body wrapped in a blanket. The work consists of 20,000 black ink strokes, roughly the estimated number of drug war casualties.

=== Literature ===
An anthology of poems, titled Bloodlust: Philippine Protest Poetry (From Marcos to Duterte), was published in 2017. Edited by Alfred Yuson and Gemino Abad, the book contains works by 65 Filipino poets writing about dictatorship, mass killings, and related subjects. Reuters also covered the war on drugs with their 2018 Pulitzer Prize-winning special report, Duterte's War, written by Clare Baldwin, Andrew Marshall, and Manuel Mogato. In 2023, journalist Patricia Evangelista published her memoir about the drug war entitled Some People Need Killing.

== See also ==
=== Other drug wars ===
- 2018–2019 Bangladesh drug war
- Brazilian drug war
- Colombian conflict
- Mexican drug war
- Human rights in Thailand § 2003 war on drugs
- Ecuadorian security crisis

=== Related topics ===
- 2017 Bureau of Customs drug smuggling scandal
- Illegal firearm trade in the Philippines
- Mega Drug Treatment and Rehabilitation Center
