= Death of Rolando Espinosa =

2016 death in Baybay, Leyte, Philippines

- Part of the Philippine drug war
- Espinosa in October 2016
- Date: November 5, 2016
- Venue: Baybay City Provincial Jail
- Location: Baybay, Leyte, Philippines
- Cause: Gunshot (autopsy findings)
- Deaths: Rolando Espinosa; Raul Yap

Rolando Rosal Espinosa Sr., the mayor of Albuera, Leyte, died on November 5, 2016, at the Baybay City Provincial Jail. He was detained at the jail due to his arrest for illegal drug possession in October 2016. According to the Criminal Investigation and Detection Group (CIDG), Espinosa was killed during a shootout that he initiated when the CIDG came to the jail to serve a search warrant on him. Espinosa's death occurred amid allegations that he was involved in the drug trade by President Rodrigo Duterte, who initiated the Philippine drug war intending to kill criminals using or distributing drugs. The Commission on Human Rights and Karapatan have held Duterte accountable for Espinosa's death, with the Senate condemning his death as extrajudicial killing.

== Background ==
Rolando Espinosa

Mayor of Albuera, Leyte
- In office June 30, 2016 – November 5, 2016
- Preceded by: Ramon de la Cerna
- Succeeded by: Rosa Nemeses

Personal details
- Born: Rolando Rosal Espinosa; May 5, 1950
- Died: November 5, 2016 (aged 66) Baybay, Leyte, Philippines

=== Rolando Espinosa ===
Rolando Rosal Espinosa Sr. was a Filipino politician who served as mayor of Albuera, Leyte. He was elected to the position in the May 2016 Philippine elections. Espinosa's campaign focused on combating illegal drugs. Prior to his political career, Espinosa already owned three houses and a hotel in Albuera. The Philippine National Police has alleged that his son Rolando "Kerwin" E. Espinosa Jr. is involved in the illegal drug trade.

=== First surrender ===
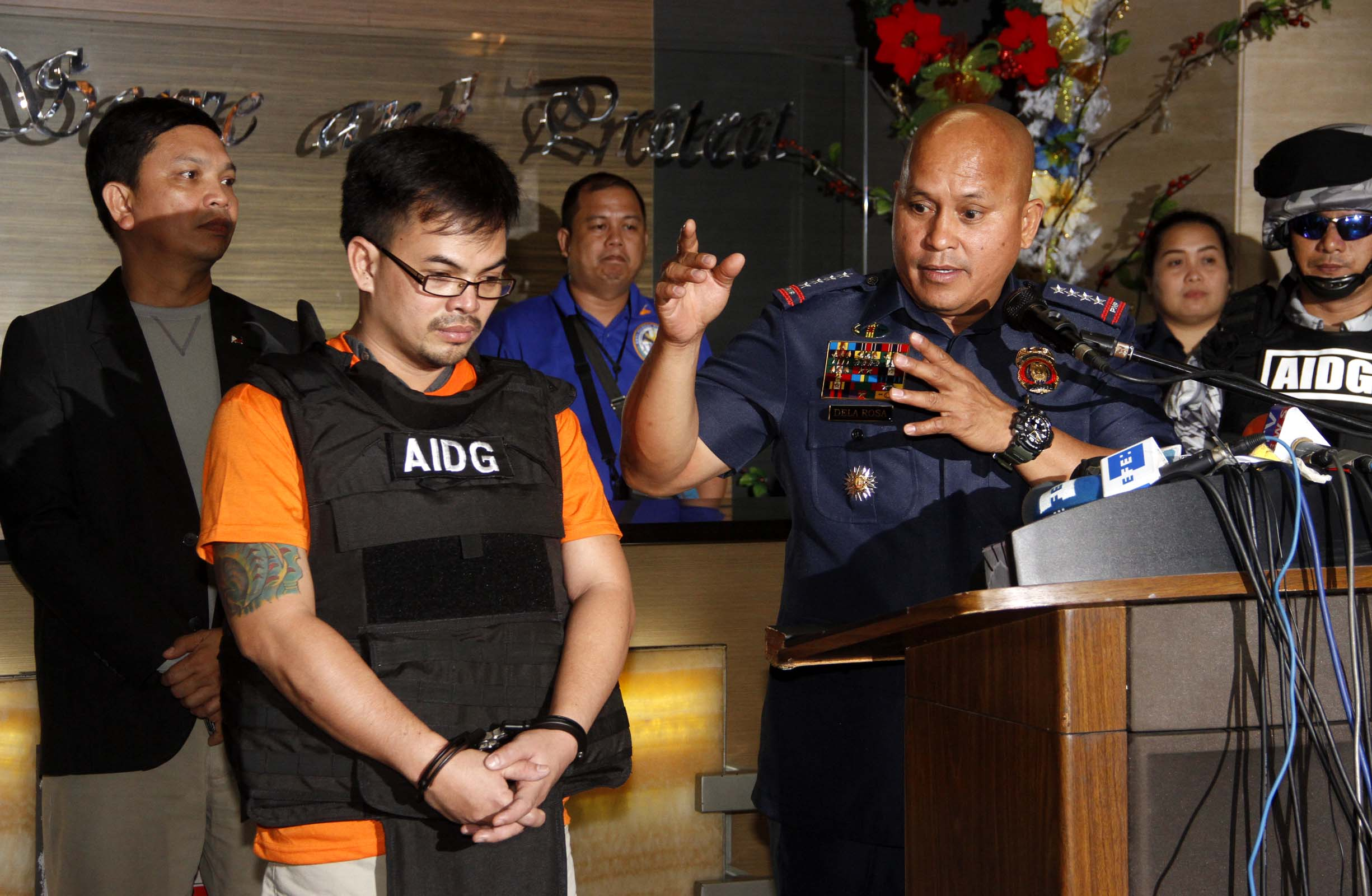
Then PNP Chief Ronald dela Rosa presents Kerwin Espinosa, who voluntarily surrendered himself to authorities, to the media.

On August 1, 2016, Philippine President Rodrigo Duterte, who was conducting a nationwide campaign against illegal drugs, asked Espinosa and his son Kerwin to surrender themselves within 24 hours "on the grounds of drug-trafficking and coddling." Duterte said that the police would arrest and possibly shoot them if they resisted arrest. Fearing for his life, Espinosa voluntarily surrendered himself at Camp Crame to Philippine National Police (PNP) Director General Ronald Dela Rosa on Aug 2. Espinosa admitted that his son Kerwin was involved in the illegal drug trade in Eastern Visayas and urged Kerwin, who had a standing arrest warrant, to surrender himself to authorities. However, Espinosa denied using money from illegal drugs to finance his election campaign. He agreed to undergo drug testing and was turned over to the Criminal Investigation and Detection Group. At the time of his arrest, the mayor did not have a standing arrest warrant.

At 5:30 a.m (UTC +8) on August 3, the police had a shootout with twelve armed men with alleged links to Espinosa in Barangay Benolho in Albuera. Six of the men were killed, and 237 grams (8.4 oz) of shabu (methamphetamine) worth ₱1.9 million, along with some firearms, were seized.

On August 4, 2016, CIDG Region 8 and the Albuera Police Station filed criminal charges against the Espinosas.

On August 6, Espinosa, along with his daughter and wife, left the PNP director general's residence in Camp Crame and went back to Leyte.

On August 7, Duterte announced a list of government officials, police officers, and law practitioners who were allegedly involved in the illegal drug trade in the country. Espinosa was included in Duterte's list.

Espinosa resumed work as mayor on August 16.

=== Second surrender and arrest ===
On August 24, 2016, Espinosa went to the police to seek custody due to threats to his life. Espinosa promised to reveal his son's connections. Three days later, the police took Espinosa into custody. On October 5, Espinosa was arrested for alleged possession of illegal drugs when the police found at least 11 kilograms (24 lb) of methamphetamine at the Espinosa ancestral home in Albuerra.

Espinosa was brought to the Baybay City Regional Trial Court, which ordered him to be detained at the Baybay City Provincial Jail. In October, he was charged with illegal drug possession by the regional trial court. He was also brought to the Western Leyte Provincial Hospital where he underwent a medical examination.

== Death ==
Judge Tarcelo Sabarre Jr. of the Regional Trial Court Branch 30 issued two search warrants against Rolando Espinosa and Raul Yap, who was also suspected of being involved in illegal drugs, at the Baybay City Provincial Jail in Barangay Hipusngo. The Criminal Investigation and Detection Group (CIDG) of Region 8, led by Police Chief Inspector Leo Laraga, served the warrants in the early morning of November 5, 2016. According to the CIDG, Espinosa and Yap first shot at the CIDG operatives, resulting in a shootout between the two men and the CIDG. Espinosa and Yap died in the alleged firefight.

== Reactions ==
The Bagong Alyansang Makabayan expressed concerns over strong indications that the death of Espinosa was a "cold-blooded murder," saying that the circumstances of his death were highly questionable. They urged the relief of CIDG operatives involved in the incident as well as of the CIDG Section 8 leadership, pending a "thorough and impartial" investigation. The group also said that those implicated in the list of alleged drug lords may take advantage of Espinosa's killing. They urged Duterte to condemn Rolando Espinosa's killing and labeled the incident as a setback for the president's war on drugs.

The Commission on Human Rights and Karapatan also called for people involved in Espinosa's death to be held accountable. Karapatan in particular linked the police to "narcopolitics" and alleged that the CIDG conducted a "rubout".

Following the incident, Senator Panfilo Lacson called for the possible resumption of the Senate inquiry into deaths related to the Philippine war on drugs. He labeled the incident as a "clear case of extrajudicial killing" and as the "biggest challenge to the credibility of the PNP". Lacson alleged that there was a cover-up for "bigger personalities" and questioned why the CIDG, instead of a court sheriff, was sent, since Espinosa was already detained. He also alleged that Yap was killed so that there would be no witnesses.

== Aftermath ==
=== Investigation ===
PNP Chief Ronald Dela Rosa ordered an investigation of the incident, promising that there would be no cover-up. On the same day as the CIDG operation, operatives arrived at the crime scene where they were apprised of a Super Caliber .38 pistol, a magazine of live ammunition, a small heat-sealed sachet of suspected methamphetamine, and drug paraphernalia in Espinosa's cell.

A panel led by the Regional Director Chief Superintendent of region 8, a certain Beltejar, was formed to investigate the incident. The Regional Internal Affairs Service also planned to conduct a separate investigation.

Video footage of the CIDG operations was found to be missing. An autopsy on Espinosa's body revealed that he was shot four times, with one bullet managing to exit the body. The findings of the study also raised the possibility that Espinosa may have been lying down when he was shot dead. Two of his expensive rings were also found to be missing. The bullets were sent to the regional crime laboratory for further investigation.

The National Bureau of Investigation (NBI) also became involved in the case. In December 2016, the agency concluded that the death of Rolando Espinosa was a result of a rubout. It recommended the filing of murder and perjury charges against police personnel involved in the operation. The NBI described the arrest warrants, which served as the basis for the operation, as having been "maliciously obtained". It noted that Paul Olendan, whose perjured affidavit the warrant was based on, was in Leyte National High School in Tacloban at the time he claimed to have visited the Baybay Jail. The NBI added that there had been an anti-contraband operation on October 30, 2016, in the jail where Espinosa was detained, and that enforcers only found cellphones during that operation.

=== Burial of Espinosa ===
Espinosa was buried at the Catholic Cemetery in Albuera, Leyte on December 3, 2016, following a requiem mass at the Saint James Parish Church. His funeral procession was attended by 1,500 people.

== See also ==
- 2017 Ozamiz police raid
