= Inter-Agency Committee on Anti-Illegal Drugs =

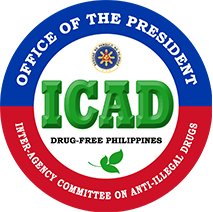
- Official Seal
- Abbreviation: ICAD

Agency overview
- Formed: March 6, 2017

Jurisdictional structure
- Operations jurisdiction: Philippines

Operational structure
- Headquarters: PDEA Bldg., NIA Northside Road, National Government Center, Barangay Pinyahan, Diliman, Quezon City
- Agency executive: PDEA Director-General Isagani R. Nerez, Chairperson
- Parent agency: Office of the President of the Philippines

Website
- icad.gov.ph

The Inter-Agency Committee on Anti-Illegal Drugs (ICAD) is an inter-governmental forum in the Philippines responsible for ensuring government agencies in implementing and complying with all policies pertaining to the anti-illegal drug campaign. The agency was formed by Executive Order No. 15, signed by President Rodrigo Duterte on March 6, 2017.

The agency is divided into four clusters—enforcement, justice, advocacy, and rehabilitation and reintegration. Enforcement is carried out by the National Anti-Illegal Drugs Task Force, alongside the Philippine Drug Enforcement Agency, which also chairs ICAD.

== History ==
In May 2017, ICAD launched #RealNumbersPH to tally extrajudicial killings and deaths associated with the Philippine drug war.

On Leni Robredo's appointment as ICAD vice chair, she said she aimed to "fix the campaign against illegal drugs", by ending the killing of innocent people and going after officials responsible for the kilings. In January 2020, Robredo released a report calling the drug war a "massive failure" and noting that only about 1% of illegal drugs in circulation have been seized.

== Member agencies ==
The agency is chaired by Philippine Drug Enforcement Agency (PDEA) Director-General Aaron Aquino. Vice President Leni Robredo, referred to as the drug czar, served as co-chairperson of the agency from November 6 to November 24, 2019. The member agencies of the committee are:

- Dangerous Drugs Board
- Department of the Interior and Local Government
- Department of Justice
- Department of Health
- Department of Education
- Department of Social Welfare and Development
- Department of Trade and Industry
- Department of Agriculture
- Department of National Defense
- Technical Education and Skills Development Authority
- Philippine Information Agency
- Public Attorney's Office
- Office of the Solicitor General
- Philippine Coast Guard
- Philippine National Police
- National Bureau of Investigation
- Bureau of Customs
- Bureau of Immigration
- Armed Forces of the Philippines
- Anti-Money Laundering Council
