= Albuera, Leyte =

Municipality in Leyte, Philippines

Albuera
- Municipality
- Municipality of Albuera
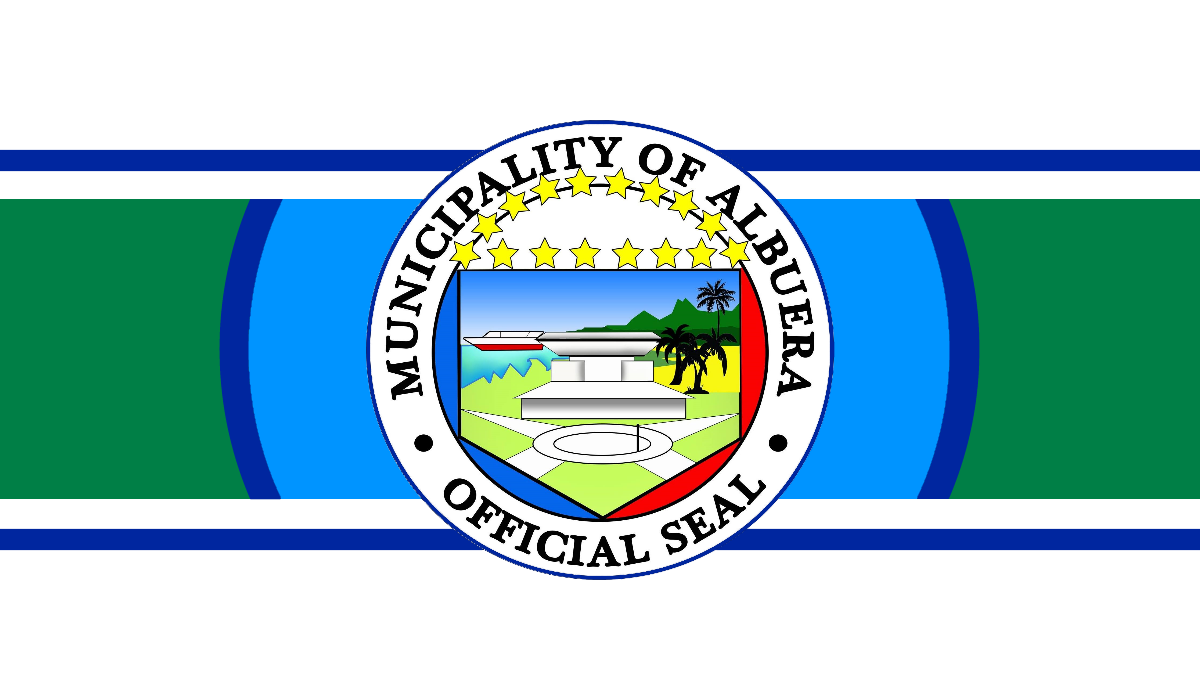
- Flag
- Nickname: Heart of Leyte
- Interactive map of Albuera
- Location within the Philippines
- Coordinates: 10°55′07″N 124°41′32″E
- Country: Philippines
- Region: Eastern Visayas
- Province: Leyte
- District: 4th District
- Barangays: 16 (see Barangays)

Government
  - Type: Sangguniang Bayan
  - Mayor: Rolan "Kerwin" E. Espinosa (Independent)
  - Vice Mayor: Mariel "RR" E. Marinay (Independent)
  - Representative: Richard I. Gomez (PFP)
  - Councilors: List: • Germanico C. Barte; • Mary Jane B. Cagula; • Imelda A. Fadul; • Leny S. Bilbao; • Manuel E. Bantasan; • Miguel D. Retuya; • Mario T. Barte; • Roxanne R. Zaldivar; DILG Masterlist of Officials
  - Electorate: 32,251 voters (2025)

Area
  - Total: 303.35 km^{2} (117.12 sq mi)
- Highest elevation: 848 m (2,782 ft)
- Lowest elevation: 0 m (0 ft)

Population (2024 census)
  - Total: 47,333
  - Density: 156.03/km^{2} (404.13/sq mi)
  - Households: 11,992

Economy
  - Income class: 1st municipal income class
  - Poverty incidence: 27.45% (2023)
  - Revenue: ₱ 287.1 million (2024)
  - Assets: ₱ 904.2 million (2024)
  - Expenditure: ₱ 229.6 million (2024)
  - Liabilities: ₱ 147.7 million (2024)

Service provider
  - Electricity: Leyte 5 Electric Cooperative (LEYECO 5)
- Time zone: UTC+8 (PST)
- ZIP code: 6542
- PSGC: 0803703000
- IDD : area code: +63 (0)53
- Native languages: Cebuano; Tagalog
- Website: www.lgualbuera.com

Albuera, officially the Municipality of Albuera (Cebuano: Lungsod sa Albuera; Waray: Bungto han Albuera; Tagalog: Bayan ng Albuera), is a First Class municipality in the province of Leyte, Philippines. According to the 2024 census, it has a population of 47,333 people.

== Etymology ==
The place got its name Albuera which means fresh water lake, named after a town in Galicia, Spain by a Spanish Priest.

== History ==
=== Consolidation of Albuera into Ormoc ===
In 1903, Albuera was consolidated into Ormoc..

=== Mayor shot dead inside prison ===
On November 4, 2016, 1st-term Albuera Mayor Rolando Espinosa Sr., who was linked to illegal drugs through his son and alleged drug lord Rolan "Kerwin" Espinosa, was shot dead inside his prison cell at the Baybay City Sub Provincial Jail. Espinosa was replaced by his vice mayor Rosa Meneses while councilor Sixto dela Victoria filled in as vice mayor.

== Geography ==
=== Barangays ===
Albuera is politically subdivided into 16 barangays. Each barangay consists of puroks and some have sitios.

- Antipolo
- Balugo
- Benolho
- Cambalading
- Damula-an
- Doña Maria (Kangkuirina)
- Mahayag
- Mahayahay
- Poblacion
- Salvacion
- San Pedro
- Seguinon
- Sherwood
- Tabgas
- Talisayan
- Tinag-an

=== Climate ===
Climate data for Albuera, Leyte
Month	Jan	Feb	Mar	Apr	May	Jun	Jul	Aug	Sep	Oct	Nov	Dec	Year
Mean daily maximum °C (°F)	28 (82)	28 (82)	29 (84)	30 (86)	31 (88)	30 (86)	29 (84)	29 (84)	29 (84)	29 (84)	29 (84)	28 (82)	29 (84)
Mean daily minimum °C (°F)	22 (72)	22 (72)	22 (72)	23 (73)	24 (75)	25 (77)	24 (75)	25 (77)	24 (75)	24 (75)	23 (73)	23 (73)	23 (74)
Average precipitation mm (inches)	73 (2.9)	56 (2.2)	75 (3.0)	71 (2.8)	114 (4.5)	174 (6.9)	172 (6.8)	163 (6.4)	167 (6.6)	161 (6.3)	158 (6.2)	125 (4.9)	1,509 (59.5)
Average rainy days	15.2	12.5	16.2	17.3	23.9	27.3	28.4	26.9	26.9	27.1	23.8	19.3	264.8
Source: Meteoblue

== Demographics ==
Population census of Albuera
Year	Pop.	±% p.a.
1903	4,635	—
1918	8,542	+4.16%
1939	13,696	+2.27%
1948	20,950	+4.84%
1960	18,501	−1.03%
1970	22,205	+1.84%
1975	25,368	+2.71%
1980	27,585	+1.69%
1990	32,395	+1.62%
1995	33,939	+0.88%
2000	34,335	+0.25%
2007	39,199	+1.84%
2010	40,553	+1.24%
2015	46,332	+2.57%
2020	47,151	+0.37%
2024	47,333	+0.09%
Source: Philippine Statistics Authority

In the 2024 census, the population of Albuera was 47,333 people, with a density of 160 inhabitants per square kilometre or 410 inhabitants per square mile.

== Economy ==
Poverty incidence of Albuera

Source: Philippine Statistics Authority

== Education ==
Albuera has 5 secondary schools

- Balugo National High School
- Damula-an National High School
- Doctor Geronimo B. Zaldivar Memorial School of Fisheries
- Seguinon National High School
- Albuera Private High School

== Elected Officials ==
2025-2028 Albuera, Leyte Officials
Position	Name	Party
Mayor	Rolan E. Espinosa	Independent
Vice Mayor	Mariel E. Marinay	Independent
Councilors	Carl Kevin E. Batistis	Independent
Councilors	Rolando M. Ebcas Jr.	Independent
Councilors	Joje B. Ybañez	Independent
Councilors	Rodolfo S. Bilbao Jr.	Independent
Councilors	Alberto C. Sumaljag	Independent
Councilors	Roberto C. Colasito	Bunyog
Councilors	Romeo M. Junco	Independent
Councilors	Andres C. Tudio	Bunyog
Ex Officio Municipal Council Members
ABC President	TBD	Nonpartisan
SK Federation President	TBD	Nonpartisan
