= International Criminal Court investigation in the Philippines =

Situation in the Republic of the Philippines
- The seal of the International Criminal Court
- File no.: ICC-01/21
- Date opened: July 15, 2021
- Incident(s): Philippine drug war
- Crimes: Crimes against humanity: · Murder · Torture · Rape

Status of suspects
- Rodrigo Duterte: In custody; ongoing trial
- Ronald dela Rosa: At-large

The International Criminal Court investigation in the Philippines, or the situation in the Republic of the Philippines, is an ongoing investigation by the International Criminal Court (ICC) into alleged crimes against humanity committed during the Philippine drug war.

The Philippines announced its intention to withdraw from the Rome Statute on March 14, 2018, approximately one month after the ICC launched a preliminary investigation into the situation in the country. The withdrawal took effect on March 16, 2019. Since the Philippines is no longer a state party to the Rome Statute, the investigation covers only the period during which the treaty was in force in the country, between November 1, 2011, and March 16, 2019. In a 2021 ruling, the Supreme Court of the Philippines stated that the Philippines remains obligated to cooperate with ICC proceedings despite its withdrawal from the Rome Statute.

On March 11, 2025, former president Rodrigo Duterte was arrested by the Philippine National Police in coordination with Interpol following the issuance of an arrest warrant by the ICC. On April 23, 2026, ICC Pre-Trial Chamber I unanimously confirmed all charges against Duterte and committed him to trial before a Trial Chamber. The judges found substantial grounds to believe that Duterte was criminally responsible for crimes against humanity in connection with the Philippine drug war.

== Background ==
=== Davao Death Squad ===
The Davao Death Squad (DDS), a Davao City–based vigilante group linked to former president Rodrigo Duterte, is estimated to have killed at least a thousand people since the 1990s. According to Human Rights Watch, the group mostly targeted alleged drug dealers, petty criminals, and was involved in forced disappearances, summary executions, and drug dealing.

During an October 2016 Philippine Senate inquiry into extrajudicial killings, opposition Senator Leila de Lima presented a witness, Edgar Matobato, a self-confessed former member of the DDS; Matobato testified that the DDS was taking orders from Duterte and claimed that Duterte himself, while he was still mayor of Davao City, had killed a member of the Department of Justice with an Uzi submachine gun. Duterte dismissed Matobato's claims as a lie, and the Senate probe was terminated on October 13, 2016, for lack of evidence. Arturo Lascañas, a retired police officer who initially denied being a member of the group in the Senate hearing, retracted his statement a year later, backed up Matobato's accusations, and admitted to killing 200 people as a DDS member, claiming that they "were motivated by the reward system ... when a killing is ordered and there's a price".

=== Philippine drug war ===
A day after the 2016 presidential election, presidential forerunner Duterte said, "I will be a dictator [...] but only against forces of evil – criminality, drugs and corruption in government", and vowed that if he failed to fulfill his promise to end crime, corruption, and drugs within the first six months of his term, he would step down from the presidency. On July 1, the day after the inauguration of Duterte as president, the Philippine National Police (PNP) launched Project Double Barrel, marking the beginning of the Philippine drug war.

From his presidential campaign to the end of his presidency, President Duterte made multiple remarks to kill criminals and drug syndicates. He has also given law enforcers "shoot-to-kill" orders for criminals and drug syndicates, further assuring their protection from prosecution and saying he would go to jail in place of them.

By the end of Duterte's term, the number of drug suspects killed since Duterte took office was officially tallied by the Philippine government as 6,252. Human rights groups, including the ICC, however, claim drug casualties reached as high as 12,000 to 30,000 and the killings reached their peak between 2016 and 2017.

== History ==
On October 13, 2016, about four months into the Philippine drug war, ICC prosecutor Fatou Bensouda expressed deep concern over reports of extrajudicial killings of alleged drug dealers and users in the Philippines, stating that the ICC would be "closely following developments" in the country to assess whether to open a preliminary examination if necessary. The following month, on November 17, President Duterte threatened to follow Russia's lead (Note: Russia signed the Rome Statute in 2000 but never ratified it. It later withdrew its signature in 2016 (see: States parties to the Rome Statute#Russia).) by withdrawing the Philippines from the ICC, which he called "useless" in Filipino.

On April 27, 2017, Filipino lawyer Jude Sabio submitted a 77-page document to the ICC titled "The Situation of Mass Murder in the Philippines", requesting charges of mass murder and crimes against humanity against President Duterte and 11 other officials. Similarly, then-Senator Antonio Trillanes and members of the Magdalo Party-List, led by then-Representative Gary Alejano, filed a 45-page supplemental complaint requesting charges of crimes against humanity in addition to the earlier filing by Sabio. However, in January 2020, Sabio retracted his allegations and requested the ICC to dismiss the charges, claiming that his 2017 case was an orchestrated move by the Liberal Party, particularly Senators Antonio Trillanes and Leila de Lima, to discredit Duterte. The ICC rejected Sabio's request, stating that it "cannot effectively destroy or return information once it is in its possession or control".

On August 28, 2018, activists and families of eight victims of the Philippine drug war, led by the National Union of People's Lawyers, submitted a 50-page document to the ICC. This was followed up by two supplemental pleadings, filed in October 2018 and October 2019, respectively.

Inquiries on the drug war were held by the House of Representatives' Quad Committee and the Senate Blue Ribbon sub-committee in October 2024. Duterte attended the Senate inquiry and transcripts from the hearings was later submitted to the ICC by Duterte's staunch critic, former Senator Antonio Trillanes.

=== Arrest of Rodrigo Duterte ===
On March 11, 2025, Rodrigo Duterte was arrested by the Philippine National Police through the Interpol at Ninoy Aquino International Airport upon his arrival from Hong Kong, following the issuance of an arrest warrant by the ICC on charges of crimes against humanity.

=== Arrest warrant against Ronald dela Rosa ===
CCTV footage of the Senate showing Dela Rosa being chased by NBI agents inside the Senate premises.

On May 11, 2026, Senator Ronald dela Rosa resurfaced at the Senate of the Philippines after months of absence amid reports of an impending arrest by the International Criminal Court (ICC). Dela Rosa returned to participate in the election of the Senate President, where Senator Alan Peter Cayetano successfully ousted incumbent Senate President Tito Sotto.

Earlier that day, agents of the National Bureau of Investigation (NBI), accompanied by former senator Antonio Trillanes, reportedly attempted to serve an ICC arrest warrant against dela Rosa inside the Senate premises. CCTV footage later released by the Senate showed dela Rosa running through Senate corridors while being pursued by law enforcement agents. The Senate was subsequently placed under lockdown and dela Rosa was placed under Senate protective custody by the Office of the Sergeant-at-Arms upon the orders of newly elected Senate President Cayetano.

Later that evening, the ICC officially confirmed that Pre-Trial Chamber I had unsealed an arrest warrant against dela Rosa that had originally been issued under seal on November 6, 2025. The warrant charged dela Rosa as an "indirect co-perpetrator" of the alleged crime against humanity of murder in relation to killings committed during the Philippine drug war between July 3, 2016 and April 30, 2018, when he served as Chief of the Philippine National Police. The Chamber stated that there were reasonable grounds to believe that dela Rosa contributed to a widespread and systematic attack against civilians pursuant to a state policy targeting alleged drug offenders.

Following the unsealing of the warrant, human rights organisations including Human Rights Watch and Amnesty International Philippines called on the Philippine government to immediately arrest and surrender dela Rosa to the ICC.

== Jurisdiction ==
The Philippines signed the Rome Statute of the International Criminal Court (ICC) on December 28, 2000, and ratified it on August 30, 2011. The treaty came into force in the country on November 1, 2011. On March 14, 2018, a month after the ICC opened a preliminary investigation into the situation in the Philippines, President Duterte said in a statement that "the Philippines is withdrawing its ratification of the Rome statute effective immediately". Duterte rebuked the idea of permitting foreigners to interfere in the country's justice system and his administration emphasized that cases against him should be filed before the national courts; additionally, he argued that the Rome Statute, which was ratified by the Senate in 2011, was never binding in the Philippines as it was never published in the Official Gazette, a requirement for a law in the country to take effect. However, in accordance with article 127 (1) of the treaty, the withdrawal shall only take effect "one year after the date of receipt of the notification". Two days later, on March 16, the Philippines formally notified the secretary-general of the United Nations of its decision to withdraw from the Rome Statute. The country officially left the ICC one year later, on March 17, 2019.

The jurisdiction of the ICC investigation in the Philippines will be limited to the period when the country was a state party to the Rome Statute, between November 1, 2011, and March 16, 2019, encompassing almost three years of Duterte's presidency, during which the Philippine drug war was at its height. The Philippine Supreme Court, in a 2021 ruling, commented on the withdrawal from the Rome Statute and stated that the Philippines still has an obligation to cooperate in the ICC proceedings.

The administration of president Bongbong Marcos, which succeeded Duterte in June 2022, maintained that the ICC has no jurisdiction in the Philippines. He argued that the Philippines has a working justice system and hence does not warrant a probe by the ICC. This is despite the ICC meant to be complementary to domestic court systems and only prosecute cases only if "when States do not or are unwilling or unable to do" Regardless, the government has allowed the ICC to conduct its investigation in the Philippines independently. Marcos stated the PNP acted on behalf on Interpol, which the Philippines is a member of, leading to Rodrigo Duterte's arrest in March 2025.

In October 2024, former Senator Leila de Lima said that there is no legal obstacle to prevent the Philippine government's cooperation with the ICC citing Republic Act 9851 or the "Philippine Act on Crimes Against International Humanitarian Law, Genocide, and Other Crimes Against Humanity" including the surrender or extradition of accused persons "to the appropriate international court". The 2009 law came into effect two years before the Philippines ratified the Rome Statute.

== Investigation ==
On September 15, 2021, the ICC's Pre-Trial Chamber I authorized the prosecutor of the International Criminal Court to open an investigation of crimes within the court's jurisdiction in the Philippines, spanning between November 1, 2011, and March 16, 2019, before the Philippines withdrew from the ICC.

In the same month, the government of the Philippines announced that it would not cooperate with the ICC on their investigation and would bar their investigators from entering the country. However, by 2024, the government under the succeeding Bongbong Marcos administration stated that it could not prevent investigators from acting independently, despite the state's continued non-cooperation.

== Court proceedings ==
=== Pre-trial proceedings ===
Rodrigo Duterte made his initial appearance before the ICC via video link on March 14, 2025. Duterte's camp had earlier requested that his first appearance be postponed, but this was rejected. Salvador Medialdea reiterated this request in his manifestation.

The confirmation of charges hearing was scheduled for September 23, 2025. Nicholas Kaufman was named lead counsel of Duterte's defense team. Lawyers Harry Roque and Salvador Medialdea were initially selected as supporting members, but Duterte's daughter and Vice President Sara Duterte later stated that Roque and Medialdea would no longer be part of the team, which would instead consist of foreign lawyers experienced with the ICC. Dov Jacobs was later appointed associate counsel.

Kaufman stated that he would argue the ICC has no jurisdiction over the case to prevent the start of a trial. He also indicated that he would seek an interim release for Duterte, though no timeline for such an application had yet been provided.

In June 2025, Duterte's team petitioned that judges Reine Alapini-Gansou of Benin and Socorro Flores Liera of Mexico be disqualified from adjudicating on the issue of jurisdiction. All 18 judges rejected the plea on July 3, 2025.

On July 4, 2025, prosecutors at the ICC formally charged Duterte with three counts of crimes against humanity, alleging his involvement, as an indirect co-perpetrator, in at least 76 murders over several years:

- Count 1: the murder of 19 individuals between 2013 and 2016 while Duterte was mayor of Davao City and was accused of being at the apex of the Davao Death Squad
- Count 2: the assassination of 14 "high value targets" in 2016 and 2017 when Duterte was president
- Count 3: "barangay clearance operations" resulting in the murder of 43 alleged low-level drug dealers or drug addicts between 2016 and 2018 during his presidency.

In a later Pre-Confirmation Brief, the prosecution listed various eye witness statements (along with quotes from Duterte himself) in setting out their accusations that he was ultimately responsible for a vast number of extrajudicial killings, such as by providing firearms to the actual DDS gunmen or by making public statements promising law enforcement officials immunity from prosecution during any "shoot to kill" operations against drug dealers.

On August 18, 2025, Duterte's lawyers submitted an official Request for an Indefinite Adjournment to the ICC, alleging that he suffered from significant cognitive deficiencies affecting his memory and capacity for complex reasoning. A 13-page document submitted to the court described medical and psychological evaluations conducted while Duterte was in custody at the ICC Detention Centre, asserting that his condition rendered him unable to meaningfully participate in proceedings and therefore unfit to stand trial. On September 8, 2025, ICC judges allowed an indefinite postponement of pre-trial proceedings to permit further testing to determine whether Duterte was fit to stand trial.

On October 15, 2025, the ICC dismissed chief prosecutor Karim Ahmad Khan from continuing in the case over bias concerns, due to links between him and victims of Duterte's alleged crimes.

On January 26, 2026, the court declared that Duterte was fit for pre-trial hearings.

==== Alleged co-perpetrators ====
On February 13, 2026, the ICC Office of the Prosecutor disclosed additional details in its charge sheet against former Philippine president Duterte, identifying several individuals as alleged co-perpetrators in relation to crimes against humanity committed during the Philippine government’s anti-drug campaign. According to the prosecution, Duterte and these individuals allegedly shared a common plan to “neutralise” suspected drug personalities through acts including murder, carried out by law-enforcement units and associated structures.

The ICC document stated that the alleged co-perpetrators exercised either de jure or de facto authority over police and security forces involved in the implementation of the anti-drug operations. The prosecution further alleged that these individuals contributed to the planning, coordination, or supervision of the campaign and failed to prevent or punish the commission of crimes under their control.

Those named in the ICC charge sheet included incumbent and former government officials, among them senators, former chiefs of the Philippine National Police, senior police commanders, and heads of law-enforcement agencies. Media reports identified the alleged co-perpetrators as including Senator Ronald dela Rosa, Senator Bong Go, former Philippine National Police chiefs Oscar Albayalde and Camilo Cascolan, former Manila Police District director Vicente Danao, former National Bureau of Investigation director Dante Gierran, former Philippine Drug Enforcement Agency chief Isidro Lapeña, and former Justice Secretary Vitaliano Aguirre II, among others.

==== Confirmation of charges ====
Duterte's confirmation of charges hearing was held between February 23 and 27, 2026. On April 23, 2026, all charges against Rodrigo Duterte were confirmed by the ICC Pre-Trial Chamber I, committing him to a trial. In a unanimous decision, the pre-trial judges found that there are "substantial grounds to believe" Duterte was "criminally responsible" for the crimes against humanity presented by the prosecution. The chamber then affirmed that the case would be transferred to an ICC Trial Chamber.

Following the confirmation, Palace Press Officer Claire Castro said that the Philippine government welcomes and respects the chamber's decision to confirm all criminal charges against Duterte and to put him on trial. Families of victims of the war on drugs celebrated the decision. Their lawyers described it as their "first big step in attaining justice for their murdered loved ones." Members of the House Minority Bloc released similar reactions and statements about the confirmation of charges. ML Partylist representative Leila de Lima characterized it as "a victory for the families of the victims, for the bereaved who have long yearned for justice", while Makabayan Bloc representatives Antonio Tinio, Sarah Elago, and Renee Co, framed it as "a critical step forward for victims and survivors who have long been denied justice in the Philippines".

=== Trial proceedings ===
In May 2026, former president Rodrigo Duterte reorganized his legal defense team before the ICC ahead of trial proceedings. On May 8, Duterte's lead counsel Nicholas Kaufman filed a request before the ICC Trial Chamber III seeking permission to withdraw from the case, stating that Duterte had informed him of his decision to appoint new lead counsel and restructure his defense team. Associate counsel Dov Jacobs also withdrew from Duterte's legal team as part of the reorganization, with his request being approved immediately.

On May 11, 2026, the ICC Trial Chamber III granted Kaufman's request to withdraw as Duterte's lead counsel. The chamber ruled that the withdrawal would not cause prejudice or inconvenience because replacement counsel was prepared to immediately assume representation. The chamber also ordered that the identity of Duterte's new counsel be publicly disclosed unless sufficient justification for confidentiality was presented.

Subsequent reports identified British barrister Peter Haynes as the lawyer appointed to succeed Kaufman as Duterte's lead counsel before the ICC. According to Kaufman, Rodrigo Duterte's daughter Kitty Duterte and common-law wife Honeylet Avanceña picked his successor counsel. Meanwhile, the ICC announced that Australian lawyer Kate Gibson has been appointed as the new associate counsel for Duterte on May 18 upon the request of Haynes the same day. The ICC also released the document dated May 13, 2026, showing Duterte himself signed the file appointing Haynes as his new lead counsel. Haynes' appointment was formalized on May 15 by the ICC.

Duterte's trial is scheduled to start on November 30, 2026.

== Further readings ==
- Flores, Dominique Nicole (March 14, 2025). "Full Text: Rodrigo Duterte's first court appearance before the ICC". The Philippine Star.
- "Timeline: ICC's probe into PH drug war". CNN Philippines. July 18, 2023. Archived from the original on July 19, 2023.
- Gavilan, Jodesz (March 10, 2025). "Timeline: The International Criminal Court and Duterte's bloody war on drugs". Rappler.
