= Dante Gierran =

Filipino lawyer and accountant (born 1955)

Director of the National Bureau of Investigation
- In office July 1, 2016 – February 2020
- President: Rodrigo Duterte
- Preceded by: Virgilio Mendez

Chief Executive Officer and President of the Philippine Health Insurance Corporation
- In office September 17, 2016 – 2022
- President: Rodrigo Duterte
- Preceded by: Ricardo Morales

Personal details
- Born: Dante A. Gierran; February 1955 (age 71)

Dante A. Gierran is a Filipino lawyer and accountant who was the director of the National Bureau of Investigation from 2016 to 2020 and later the president of the Philippine Health Insurance Corporation from 2020 to 2022.

== Early life and education ==
Born in February 1955, Dante Gierran attended the Rizal Memorial Colleges in Davao City graduating with an accounting degree in 1978. He also worked with the Tardal Security Guards Service in the 1970s.

In the 1990s, he pursued studies in law attending the University of Mindanao and the International Harvardian University. He obtained his law degree in 1993.

== Career ==
=== Early years ===
Gierran as a credit investigator and accountant worked for the Manila Banking Corporation from 1979 to 1990. As per Supreme Court records, Gierran joined the bar on May 8, 1997.

=== National Bureau of Investigation ===
Gierran first joined the National Bureau of Investigation (NBI) as a line agent back in 1990 and was assigned in Manila until 1991. From 1992 to 2001, he was assigned in Davao City, and from 2002 to 2003, Gierran was allocated to Vigan. He later became a training director and served under the office of then-NBI director Nonnatus Rojas.

Gierran also became the NBI regional director for Southern Mindanao from 2013 to 2016.

==== Director ====
When President Rodrigo Duterte assumed office in 2016, Gierran was elevated as director of the NBI. He assumed office on July 1, 2016, succeeding Virgilio Mendez.

Under his watch, the NBI led an investigation on the kidnapping and killing of Jee Ick-Joo, WellMed, a dialysis clinic, over an alleged "ghost" Philhealth claims, alleged corruption within the Philippine Charity Sweepstakes Office and the Bureau of Corrections, and cases involving the illegal drug trade and figures allegedly linked to it such as Kerwin Espinosa.

In September 2016, self-confessed member of the Davao Death Squad (DDS) Edgar Matobato alleged that Gierran, then an NBI agent, led a 2007 DDS operation in which a man was killed and fed to a crocodile. Gierran denied the accusations. While admitting knowing Matobato personally, he said he never brought Matobato with him as part of his official duties during his assignment in Davao. In February 2026, the International Criminal Court publicized the list of co-perpetrators in the war on drugs case and Gierran is among them.

Gierran left his post in mid-February 2020 after reaching the mandatory retirement age of 65. Duterte gave him a deadline until December 2020 to "clean up" the state-run insurer and has been considering to abolish or privatize it.

Gierran is among the "Davao Boys", a small circle of Duterte's trusted associates, which included law enforcers who were previously assigned to Davao, tasked to implement the nationwide drug war, and afterwards given choice positions in government.

=== Philhealth ===
President Rodrigo Duterte announced on August 31, 2016, that he will be appointing Gierran as president and CEO of Philhealth (Philhealth). He succeeded Ricardo Morales who resigned on August 26, 2020, due to health reasons.

Admitting he had no prior knowledge on public health, Gierran stated he was "scared, but not cowed" and was tasked to deal with the corruption issue within the agency. The Duterte administration cited his seven years of management experience and a background as a certified public accountant and a lawyer as justification for his appointment. The Citizens Urgent Response to End COVID-19 (CURE Covid) said that the "law says the PhilHealth CEO should have seven years experience in public health, management, finance and health economics" and that Gierran's appointment demonstrated Duterte's "lack of understanding of the workings of the state health insurance firm and the chronic problems plaguing it".

Gierran took his oath of office on September 17, 2016. He ordered all officials of Philhealth to tender their courtesy resignations on September 30.

The succeeding administration of President Bongbong Marcos, named Emmanuel Ledesma Jr. as acting president and CEO of Philhealth in November 2022.

== Personal life ==
Gierran is a member of the Lex Talionis Fraternitas, which had President Rodrigo Duterte as among its ranks.
