= Edgar Matobato =

Filipino hitman and whistleblower (born 1959)

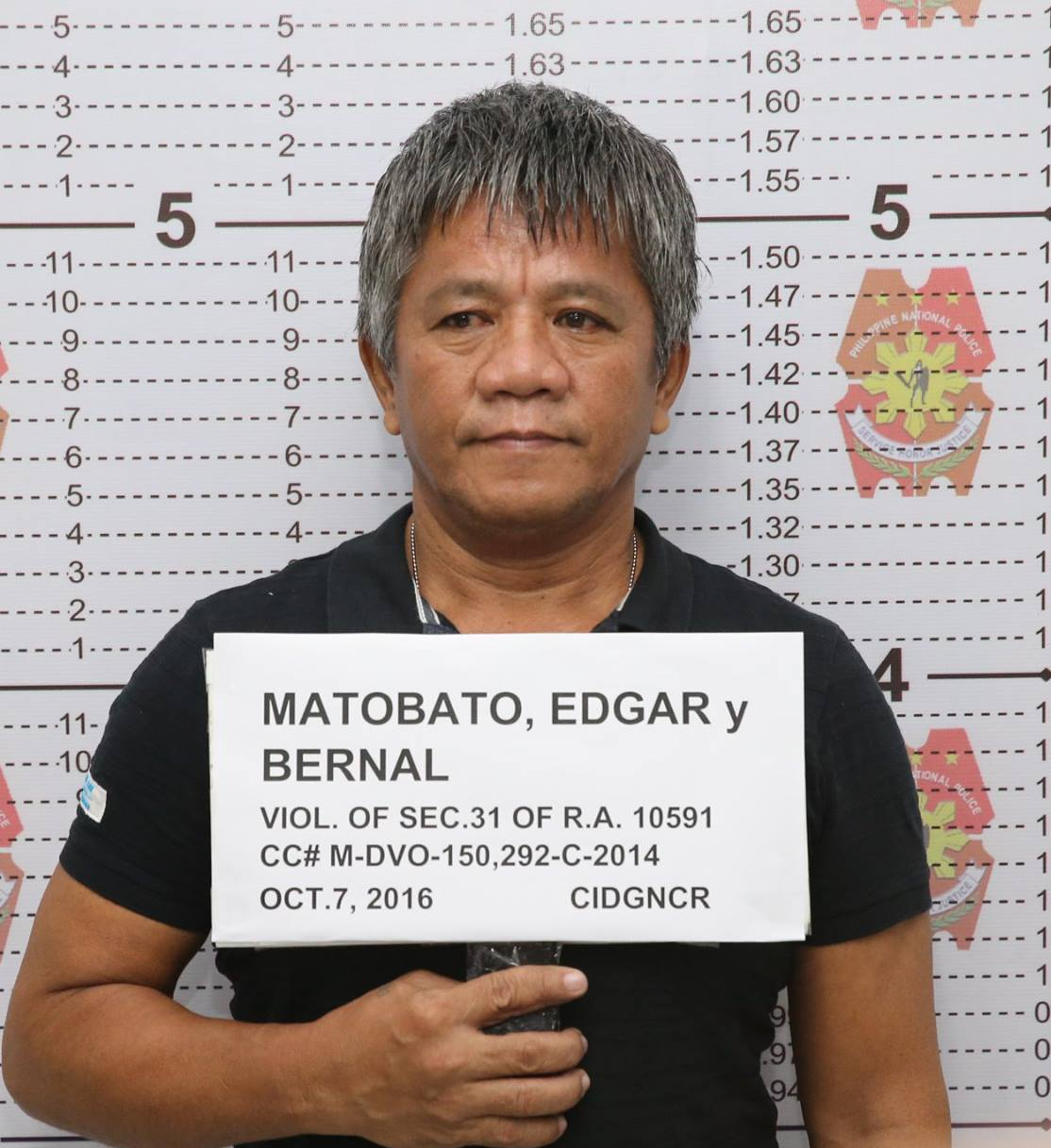
- Mug shot of Matobato during his October 2016 arrest
- Born: Edgar Bernal Matobato; June 11, 1959 (age 67); Davao City, Philippines
- Occupation: Former hitman
- Years active: 1988–2013
- Known for: Testifying about the Davao Death Squad and Rodrigo Duterte's involvement

Edgar Bernal Matobato (born June 11, 1959) is a Filipino self-confessed hitman and whistleblower who claims to be a member of the Davao Death Squad (DDS), an alleged vigilante group tasked to summarily execute suspected criminals, from 1988 to 2013. He gained international recognition in 2016 when he testified before the Senate of the Philippines, reporting about his experience as a hitman under the DDS. In his testimony, he also alleged that former Philippine president Rodrigo Duterte acted as the group's commander. Since withdrawing from the DDS, he had been in hiding in various places in the Philippines, under the custody of both the National Bureau of Investigation and then by priests from the Catholic Church.

In 2017, his lawyer filed a complaint to the International Criminal Court (ICC), asking for a formal investigation into the mass killings in the Philippine drug war. As of 2025, Matobato has escaped the Philippines, aided by priests of the Church and under the protection of the ICC, and remains in hiding following persistent death threats against him.

== Early life and career ==
Edgar Bernal Matobato was born on June 11, 1959. Matobato grew up in an impoverished household and is mostly illiterate. His father was a member of the Civilian Home Defense Forces (CHDF) and was killed by communist insurgents in front of him when he was a teenager. He joined the CHDF himself in 1982, ultimately joining Davao City's "Heinous Crimes Unit"—informally called the "Lambada Boys" and later the "Davao Death Squad" (DDS)—in 1988. He alleges that the DDS told him to kill those who they considered as accused criminals like drug pushers, rapists, and thieves. Matobato specialized in body disposal, which involved slicing corpses into smaller parts before burying them into "Laud quarry", named after a policeman who owned the quarry and its firing range, or off a bridge in San Rafael, Davao City which ran over the Davao River. He recounts that in 2009, he began to kill others who were not criminals—including businessmen, politicians, and journalists—at the command of Duterte. The alleged hit list also included then-Commission on Human Rights chairwoman Leila de Lima, who had been investigating the DDS and extrajudicial killings in Davao.

In 2013, Matobato withdrew from the DDS. He alleges that in June 2014, police officers arrested him without a warrant for illegal possession of firearms, and that the officers tortured him for a week, pressuring him to take responsibility and confess to the killing of Richard King, a businessman from Cebu City. He was later released at the request of his uncle, a former police officer. He then fled between Cebu City, Leyte, and Samar. There, he attempted to surrender to a regional office of the Commission on Human Rights in August 21, 2014, but was told that they were unable to protect him. He was then instructed by staff to go to the Department of Justice in Manila, where he applied to be part of the National Bureau of Investigation's (NBI) Witness Protection Program in September of that year. Matobato's torture was corroborated by NBI investigators, who recommended filing a case against the police officers involved. The case was later dismissed by the Department of Justice in 2016 from a lack of evidence to establish a probable cause.

A few days before Rodrigo Duterte won the 2016 Philippine presidential election, at his lawyer's advice, Matobato left the program and went into hiding. On the same day, escorts from the Presidential Security Group brought Matobato to a safe house in Bulacan, following one of former president Benigno Aquino III's last orders as president. He was later brought to the office of the Catholic Bishops' Conference of the Philippines, who hid Matobato and his wife to various church compounds in Manila. His protection was handled by members of Magdalo, a political party headed by former senator Antonio Trillanes. A priest helped Matobato contact De Lima, a senator at the time and a critic of Duterte's drug war, who then met up with him in early September 2016.

== Senate hearing ==
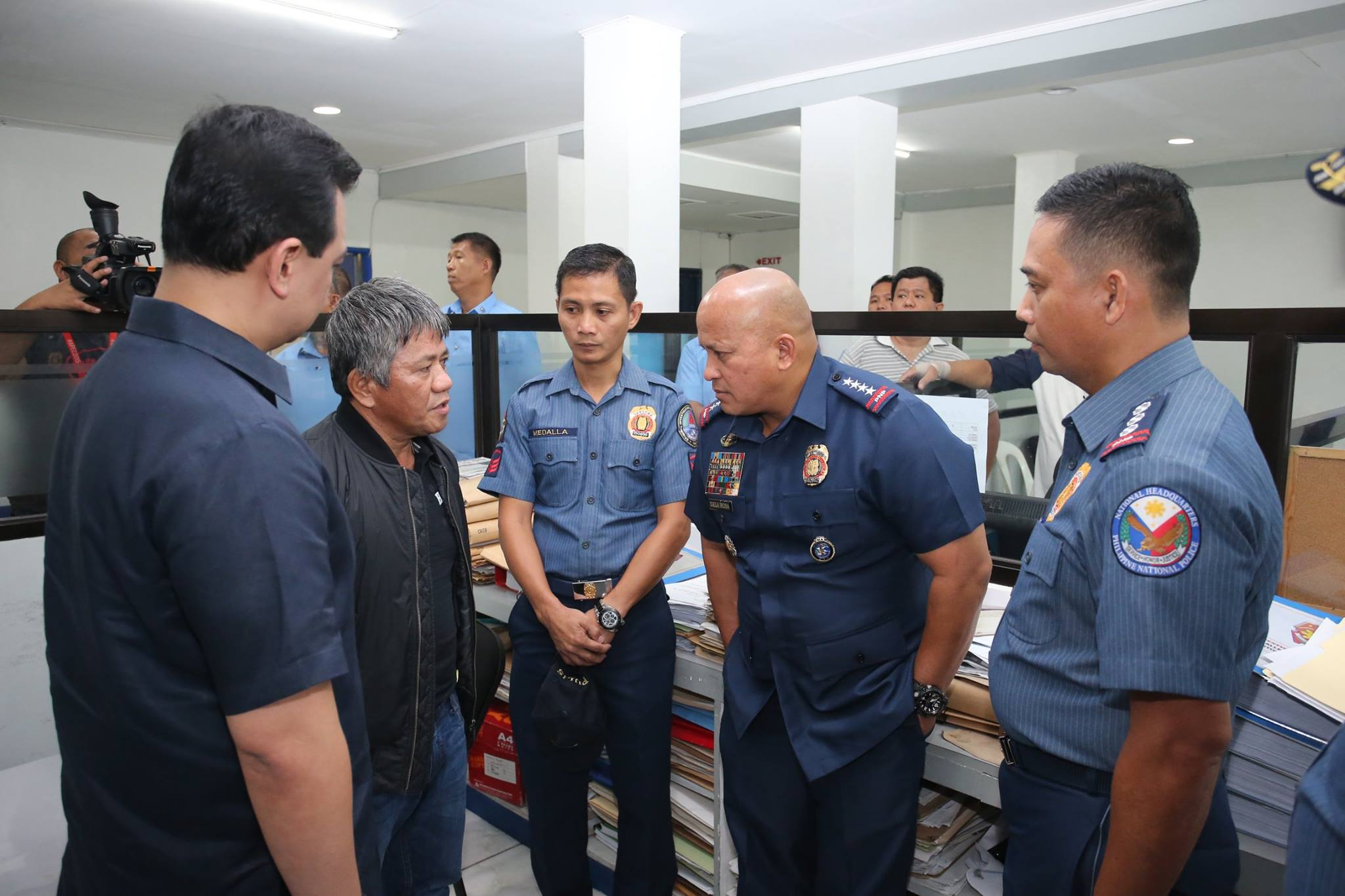
Matobato speaking with Philippine National Police (PNP) chief Ronald dela Rosa on October 7, 2016, shortly after his arrest for illegal possession of firearms.

Matobato appeared before the Philippine Senate Justice Committee on September 15, 2016, during a hearing on extrajudicial killings, having been invited by De Lima who chaired the committee. At the hearing, he narrated his experiences and even revealed names of policemen he worked with in the past. He confessed that he had killed many people, including an alleged terrorist named Sali Makdum. Matobato further recounted that Duterte, the Davao City mayor at the time, once emptied an Uzi in killing a National Bureau of Investigation official only known as "Amisola", (Note: Also reported as being named "Jamisola".) though the President denied ties with Matobato and claimed not knowing him.

Matobato says he was among the names listed under Davao City Hall's Civil Security Unit (CSU) although he was considered a "ghost employee". From 1988 to 2013, Matobato said hundreds were killed in the 25-year span of his service to Davao's CSU. Senator Alan Peter Cayetano questioned Matobato, pointing out how in his testimonies, he changed his stance from "pretending to have personal knowledge" to "hearsay". Retired policeman Arturo Lascañas, who Matobato named as his handler in the DDS, was brought to the Senate in October to testify. There, he denied the existence of the DDS and allegations that he was part of it. In February 2017, Lascañas recanted his earlier statements, admitting that he had been forced to lie under oath fearing the safety of his family.

Shortly after Matobato's testimony, De Lima was removed from her position as chairwoman of the Senate Justice Committee. The House Justice Committee also began hearings on allegations that De Lima had been receiving payments from drug lords imprisoned at the New Bilibid Prison in exchange for preferential treatment. Those hearings led to her imprisonment and court charges filed in 2017, which were all dropped by 2024.

Following Matobato's hearing, he was denied Senate protection by then-Senate President Koko Pimentel. His protection under Trillanes remained until October 7, 2016, when he was turned over by Trillanes to the Philippine National Police after an arrest warrant was issued against him by a Davao municipal trial court. The warrant stemmed from a failure to appear at his arraignment for a case of illegal possession of firearms, filed in 2014. He was kept at Camp Crame for a week, and was later released after posting a bail of ₱30,000. Trillanes then continued providing protection for Matobato after his release. He filed murder, kidnapping, and crimes against humanity charges against Duterte and other alleged DDS members to the Office of the Ombudsman in December 2016 through his lawyer, Jude Sabio. Duterte was later removed from the list of respondents in 2017. Matobato was arrested again on March 6, 2017, for a frustrated murder charge, where he posted a ₱200,000 bail. He went into hiding again in 2017, after the Regional Trial Court of Panabo issued a non-bailable warrant for his arrest in connection to the kidnapping of Sali Makdum on March 27.

== International Criminal Court case ==
On April 24, 2017, representing Matobato, Sabio filed a 77-page complaint at the International Criminal Court (ICC) against Duterte and his subordinates titled "The Situation of Mass Murder in the Philippines, Rodrigo Duterte: The Mass Murderer" to its Prosecutor Fatou Bensouda. Aside from President Duterte, the complaint included Senators Richard Gordon and Alan Peter Cayetano, House Speaker Pantaleon Alvarez, Justice Secretary Vitaliano Aguirre II, Interior Secretary Ismael Sueno, PNP Chief Ronald dela Rosa, Police Colonels Edilberto Leonardo, Royina Garma, and Sanson Buenaventura, NBI Director Dante Gierran, and Solicitor General Jose Calida.

On January 14, 2020, Sabio, accompanied by now-disbarred attorney Larry Gadon, announced that he was withdrawing his complaint at the ICC. Sabio would claim that the withdrawal was due to his refusal to be a part of the politics of Senators Trillanes and de Lima, Congressman Gary Alejano, as well as the Liberal Party against President Duterte. Bensouda responded that Sabio's withdrawal would not affect the case, since there were 57 other communications to the ICC against Duterte.

Following persistent death threats, in January 2025, Matobato fled the Philippines with his family using a fake passport. Posing as a gardener, he left the country together with two Catholic priests who negotiated his escape and two journalists from The New York Times. Their first flight brought them to Dubai, then to an undisclosed location. He was brought under the protection of the ICC, and gave a deposition for the court to "secure his statements and testimonies". The Bureau of Immigration began investigating Matobato's escape from the country, including whether he had changed his appearance, and identified the fake name he used during immigration. Meanwhile, the Department of Foreign Affairs reported that Matobato did not have any passport records under his name.

== Personal life ==
Matobato is informally married to Joselita Abarquez. He has two stepchildren.
