= Caparas =

Caparas is a surname. Notable people with the surname include:

- Carlo J. Caparas (born 1958), Filipino comic strip creator/writer-turned director and producer
- Emmanuel Caparas, Filipino lawyer and government official
- Mateo A. T. Caparas (1923–2020), Filipino politician, lawyer, and civic leader
