= Ramoncito Ocampo =

Filipino lawyer

Ramoncito Bienvenido T. Ocampo Jr., nicknamed "Sonny", is a Filipino lawyer and former police officer currently serving as Bulacan's provincial prosecutor. At the Department of Justice, he led a panel of prosecutors in the drug trafficking cases against Senator Leila de Lima.

== Education ==
Ocampo passed the Philippine Bar Examination in 2001.

== Career ==
Ocampo previously served as a Makati police homicide investigator in the 1990s and 2000s. He later served as head of the Ninoy Aquino International Airport Task Force by 2010.

As a lawyer, Ocampo served as an assistant city prosecutor for Quezon City. In July 2010, Ocampo was appointed to the Inter-Agency Council Against Trafficking (IACAT) after Justice Secretary Leila de Lima called on the agency to intensify its anti-human trafficking operations. By March 2011, at the request of Secretary de Lima, Ocampo joined the Department of Justice prosecution panel for the agency's investigation into the Maguindanao massacre.

=== Prosecution panel of Leila de Lima's drug trafficking cases ===
In 2017, Ocampo began serving as senior assistant state prosecutor in the prosecution panel of the Department of Justice's three drug trafficking cases filed against Senator Leila de Lima before the Muntinlupa Regional Trial Courts (RTC). In December 2017, the prosecution panel amended the complaints against de Lima and other co-accused, altering the charges from drug trading to conspiracy to commit drug trading; after de Lima's counsel criticized the amendments for delaying court proceedings, Ocampo stated that it was only meant to make the cases "more precise", noting that "We will not in any way prejudice the rights of the accused". In the same month, Ocampo was appointed by President Rodrigo Duterte to be the provincial prosecutor of Bataan. By 2018, Ocampo had been named as the lead prosecutor of the three cases.

In December 2020, Ocampo and the prosecution panel filed a contempt suit against Senator de Lima and her lawyer Boni Tacardon, charging them with violation of the sub judice rule when Tacardon issued press releases on de Lima's trials; the suit was filed after pro-Duterte blogger Mark Lopez brought Tacardon's statements to their attention. The Supreme Court had previously ordered the Muntinlupa RTCs to allow media coverage of de Lima's trials in 2018. In February 2021, Senator de Lima was acquitted by Judge Liezel Aquiatan at the Muntinlupa RTC Branch 205, citing the prosecution's lack of evidence that de Lima received ransom money from convicted drug trafficker Peter Co during the 2016 Senate election.

On February 2, 2022, Ocampo was appointed by President Duterte as the provincial prosecutor of Bulacan, succeeding Renato D. Samonte Jr.

In April 2023, state prosecutors attempted to present a new witness, lawyer Demiteer Huerta of the Public Attorney's Office, to one of de Lima's cases at Muntinlupa RTC Branch 204 after Judge Abraham Alcantara stated his intention to render judgement the next month. Upon the acquittal of de Lima and her former driver Ronnie Dayan by RTC Branch 204 on May 12, 2023, Ocampo and the panel of prosecutors appealed for the court to reconsider its decision. Ocampo and the prosecutors further objected to the raffling of de Lima's then-remaining drug case to Judge Alcantara for questions regarding his impartiality on a "near identical case" to what Alcantara gave his decision to in May, resulting in Alcantara recusing himself in July 2023. On July 6, Judge Alcantara upheld his court's initial decision in May and denied the prosecution's motion to reconsider de Lima's acquittal. Solicitor General Menardo Guevarra, however, appealed the May decision to the Court of Appeals by September.

In late 2023, several witnesses including retired policeman Jerry Valeroso recanted their accusations against de Lima for her remaining drug case, and by June 24, 2024, Muntinlupa RTC Branch 206 granted de Lima's demurrer petition, citing the prosecution's failure to "prove the guilt of all the accused beyond reasonable doubt" and thus acquitting her and other co-accused of conspiracy to commit drug trading. A motion for reconsideration filed by the prosecution panel was later denied by the court in August 2024.

On April 30, 2025, the Court of Appeals granted Solicitor General Guevarra's petition and declared the RTC Branch 204's decisions from 2023 "null and void", remanding the case back to the RTC. On June 27, 2025, RTC Branch 204 reaffirmed its initial 2023 decision, upon which the panel of prosecutors led by Ocampo filed a motion before the court to reconsider its final decision. Justice Secretary Jesus Crispin Remulla criticized the panel of prosecutors' motion as "following a political agenda, not a legal agenda" and instructed Prosecutor General Richard Fadullon to "stop the foolishness of these people under us". By July 23, 2025, Ocampo and the prosecutor panel withdrew their motion for reconsideration before the RTC. Former Supreme Court spokesperson Theodore Te denounced the attempt by Ocampo and his prosecution panel to overturn de Lima's acquittal as having "no manifest intent to follow the Constitution", stating that "There must be consequences for this rogue behavior."

On September 30, 2025, Judge Alcantara of RTC Branch 204 granted the motion of Ocampo and others to withdraw their motion for reconsideration, thus deeming the court's drug case against de Lima and Dayan "closed and terminated".
