= Caguioa =

Caguioa is a surname. Notable people with the surname include:

- Alfredo Benjamin Caguioa (born 1959), Filipino jurist
- Mark Caguioa (born 1979), Filipino basketball player
