= Emmanuel Caparas =

Filipino lawyer

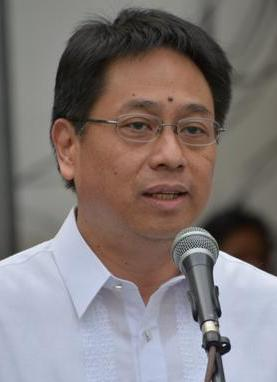
- Caparas in 2016

Secretary of Justice Acting
- In office January 22, 2016 – June 30, 2016
- President: Benigno Aquino III
- Preceded by: Alfredo Benjamin Caguioa
- Succeeded by: Vitaliano Aguirre II

Personal details
- Born: Emmanuel Leido Caparas
- Education: University of the Philippines Diliman
- Occupation: Lawyer

Emmanuel Leido Caparas is a Filipino lawyer who served as acting Secretary of Justice under the presidency of Benigno Aquino III. Prior to his appointment as acting secretary he worked as undersecretary and spokesperson of the Department of Justice. He also worked as Acting Chief of the Metropolitan Waterworks and Sewerage System Regulatory Office.

== Early life and education ==
Caparas finished elementary in Ateneo in 1973 then high school in 1977. He obtained his Economics degree from University of the Philippines Diliman in 1981, and acquired his Bachelor of Laws from the University of the Philippines College of Law, also at UP Diliman, in 1985. He was admitted to the Philippine Bar the following year.

== Career ==
Caparas started working in the Philippine Constitutional Commission of 1986 as Research attorney of then Chief Justice Roberto Concepcion from July 2 to September 15, 1986. He was then assigned as Senior Law Clerk for Associate Justice Florentino P. Feliciano from September 16, 1986 until October 31, 1989.

In November 1989, he joined SyCip Salazar Hernandez and Gatmaitan Law Office where he worked as Senior Associate focusing on litigation, arbitration and corporate work until January 1994. He then founded CD Technologies Asia, Inc in February 1994. While serving as chair and president of the new company he also served as IT Consultant at the Commission on Human Rights, Integrated Bar of the Philippines and Office of the Government Corporate Counsel. In February 2006, he retired from CD Asia and set up Symferon KMR, Inc. which engaged in local and overseas activities.

He closed shop in March 2008 to rejoin the Supreme Court as head of its Management Information Systems Office. He also worked in Philippine Judicial Academy as Mediation Trainer since 2005, Court of Appeals Mediator since 2006 and Chairman of the Court Technology Department since 2008. He's also serving as Director of the National Center for Legal Resources of Integrated Bar of the Philippines since August 2011. In May 2011 he resigned from the Supreme Court. In October of the same year he was appointed to the board of trustees of the Metropolitan Waterworks and Sewerage System or MWSS. He was also assigned to serve, in concurrent capacity, as Acting Chief of the MWSS Regulatory Office.

Caparas resigned as the Acting Chief Regulator of MWSS in June 2014. This is after the Commission on Audit issued a report stating that he violated the agreement of MWSS with the concessionaires. On October 29, 2015, he was appointed as spokesman of the Department of Justice by then Acting Secretary Alfredo Benjamin Caguioa. Following the appointment of Caguioa as Associate Justice, Caparas was appointed as Acting DOJ Secretary by his former classmate and President Benigno Aquino III.
