= Leila de Lima =

Filipino lawyer, politician and human rights activist (born 1959)

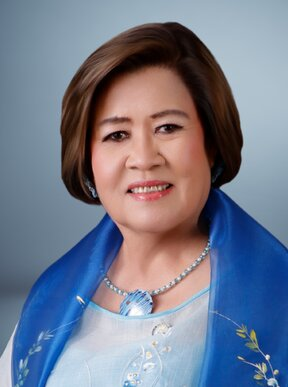
- Official portrait, 2026

House Senior Deputy Minority Leader
- Incumbent
- Assumed office March 3, 2026
- Leader: Marcelino Libanan
- Preceded by: Edgar Erice

Member of the Philippine House of Representatives for Mamamayang Liberal
- Incumbent
- Assumed office June 30, 2025

Senator of the Philippines
- In office June 30, 2016 – June 30, 2022
Senate positions
Chair of the Senate Electoral Reforms and People's Participation Committee
In office July 25, 2016 – July 24, 2018
Preceded by	Koko Pimentel
Succeeded by	Koko Pimentel
Chair of the Senate Justice and Human Rights Committee
In office July 25, 2016 – September 19, 2016
Preceded by	Koko Pimentel
Succeeded by	Dick Gordon

Secretary of Justice
- In office June 30, 2010 – October 12, 2015
- President: Benigno Aquino III
- Preceded by: Alberto Agra (Acting)
- Succeeded by: Alfredo Benjamin Caguioa (Acting)

Chairperson of the Commission on Human Rights
- In office May 19, 2008 – June 30, 2010
- President: Gloria Macapagal Arroyo
- Preceded by: Purificacion Quisumbing
- Succeeded by: Etta Rosales

Chairperson of the Liberal Party
- Incumbent
- Assumed office January 26, 2026
- Preceded by: Kiko Pangilinan

Personal details
- Born: Leila Norma Eulalia Josefa Magistrado de Lima; August 27, 1959 (age 67) Iriga, Camarines Sur, Philippines
- Party: Liberal (2015–present); ML (partylist; 2024–present)
- Spouse: Pláridel Bohol (annulled)
- Children: 2
- Relatives: Lilia de Lima (aunt)
- Education: De La Salle University (AB); San Beda University (LL.B)
- Occupation: Politician
- Profession: Lawyer
- Website: Official website

Leila Norma Eulalia Josefa Magistrado de Lima (born August 27, 1959) is a Filipino politician, lawyer, human rights activist and law professor who has served as the representative for Mamamayang Liberal, the sectoral wing of the Liberal Party, since 2025. De Lima previously served as a senator of the Philippines from 2016 to 2022 and as secretary of justice from 2010 to 2015.

Born in Iriga, Camarines Sur, de Lima was educated at the De La Salle University and the San Beda College of Law. She passed the Philippine Bar Examinations in 1985 and began her legal career as a staff member of Associate Justice Isagani Cruz. From 2008 to 2010, she served as the chairperson of the Commission on Human Rights under the presidency of Gloria Macapagal Arroyo. In 2010, President Benigno Aquino III appointed de Lima to his cabinet as secretary of justice. She would hold the position until 2015, when she sought a seat in the Senate of the Philippines. In 2016, de Lima was elected to the Senate, having run under the Koalisyon ng Daang Matuwid. She was defeated in her re-election bid in 2022 under Team Robredo–Pangilinan.

Known as a vocal critic of the administration of President Rodrigo Duterte, she was arrested in 2017 under charges linked to the New Bilibid Prison drug trafficking scandal during her term as justice secretary. Later that year, she was awarded the Prize for Freedom by Liberal International. She was held in pretrial detention until a court granted her petition for bail in 2023, although she served out her remaining term as senator and filed legislation while held.

Following her release, de Lima successfully ran as the first nominee of the Mamamayang Liberal party-list in the 2025 House of Representatives elections.

== Early life and education ==
De Lima was born on August 27, 1959, in Iriga, Camarines Sur, where she was raised. She is the eldest daughter of former Philippine Commission on Elections commissioner Vicente de Lima and Norma (née Magistrado).

De Lima completed her basic education at La Consolacion Academy (now La Consolacion College Iriga), graduating as class valedictorian. She graduated in 1980 from the De La Salle University with an AB History and Political Science degree. She finished her Bachelor of Laws (Salutatorian) degree at the San Beda College of Law in 1985. She placed eighth in the 1985 Philippine Bar Examinations with an 86.26% bar rating.

== Legal career ==
De Lima began her career as a staff member of Supreme Court Associate Justice Isagani Cruz from 1986 to 1989. She subsequently entered private practice in the 1990s, specializing in election law. She also taught law at San Beda College of Law from 1986 to 1994 and from 2006 to 2007 and worked as secretary of the House of Representatives Electoral Tribunal from 1993 to 1995.

== Chairperson of the Commission on Human Rights (2008–2010) ==
Leila de Lima was appointed as the Chairperson of the Commission on Human Rights under the administration of President Gloria Macapagal-Arroyo, serving from 2008 to 2010. Her two-year term was marked by high-profile cases such as the Davao Death Squad, human rights cases against general Jovito Palparan, and the Maguindanao massacre in 2009.

== Secretary of Justice (2010–2015) ==
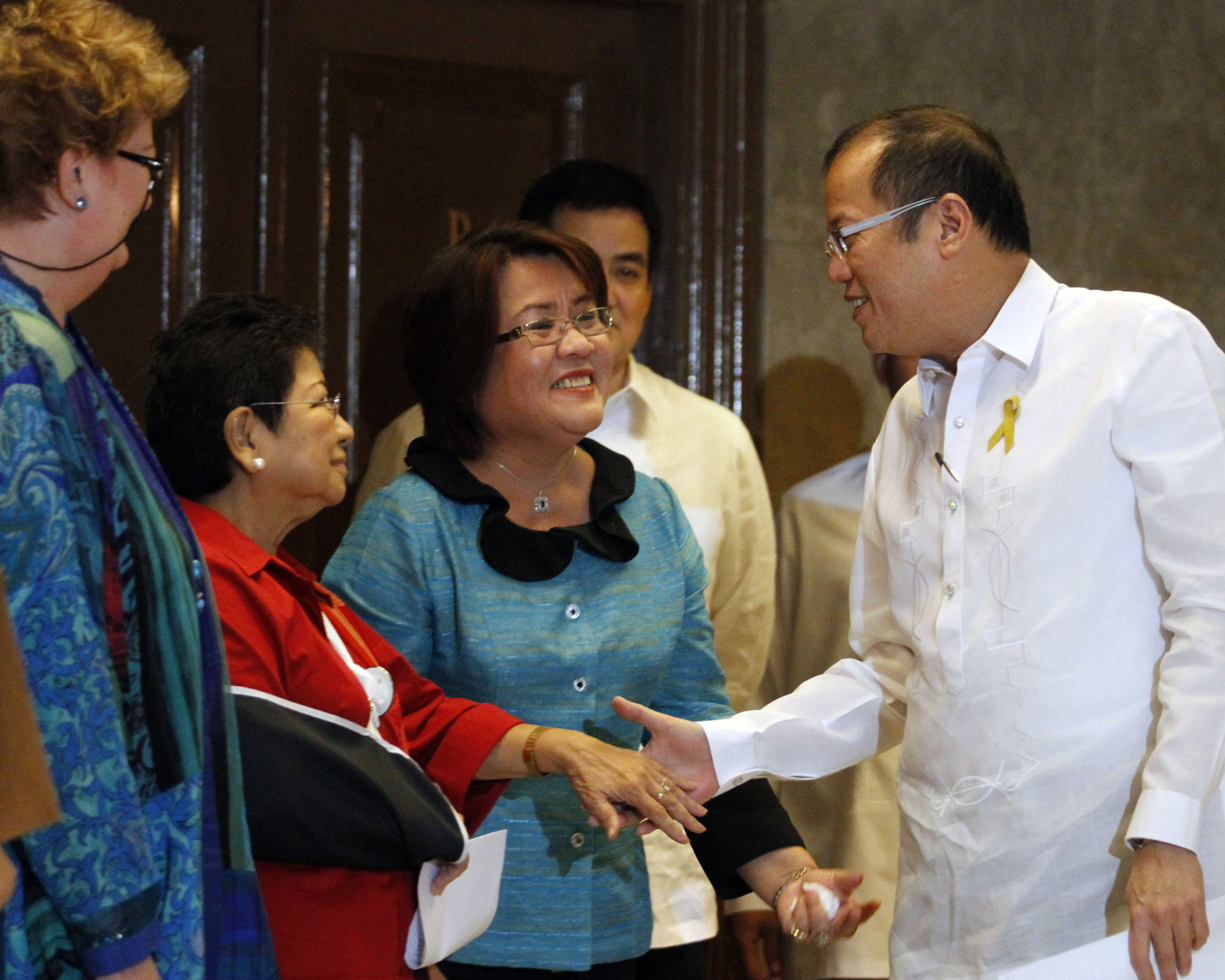
Secretary de Lima (center) with Commission on Human Rights chairperson Etta Rosales (left, in red) and President Benigno Aquino III (right), December 2010.

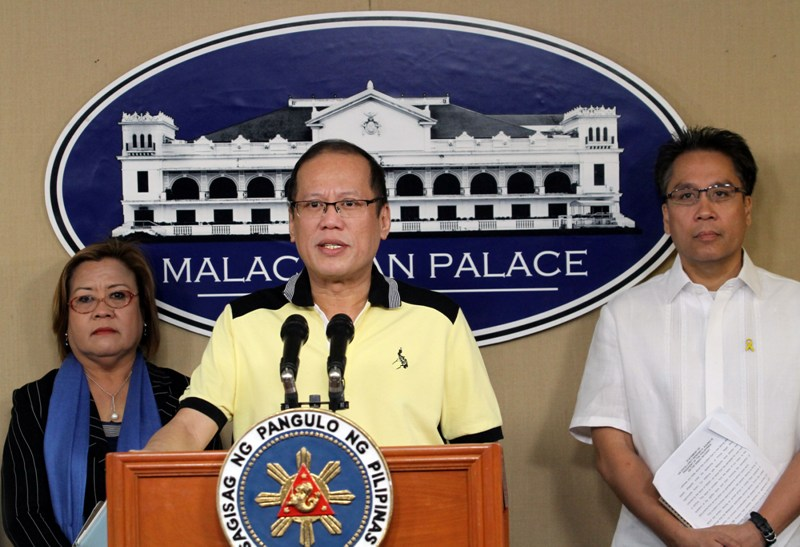
Secretary de Lima (left) with President Aquino (center) and the interior secretary Mar Roxas (right), February 2013.

In 2010, President Benigno Aquino III offered her the position of justice secretary, which she accepted. Her first high-profile case was the Manila hostage crisis, where eight Hong Kong nationals were killed. De Lima led the Incident Investigation and Review Committee that examined the botched police rescue; the panel's report recommended sanctions and criminal charges against several officials deemed responsible for mishandling the crisis.

In December 2010, following President Aquino's order, she oversaw the dropping of charges against the "Morong 43", a group of 43 health workers who had been arrested in 2010 under suspicion of rebellion. The Department of Justice (DOJ) withdrew the cases after evidence emerged that the 43 had been illegally arrested and detained, leading to the release of most of the detainees.

In November 2011, de Lima directed the Bureau of Immigration to bar former president Gloria Macapagal Arroyo from leaving the country to seek medical treatment, citing pending investigations into Hello Garci scandal. This enforcement of a DOJ "watch list" travel order defied a temporary restraining order (TRO) from the Supreme Court that would have allowed Arroyo to travel. Days later, a joint DOJ–Commission on Elections panel chaired by de Lima filed an electoral sabotage case against Arroyo in connection with alleged cheating in the 2007 elections. A court in Pasay promptly issued an arrest warrant (electoral sabotage being non-bailable), and Arroyo was arrested and placed under hospital detention. The Supreme Court demanded that de Lima explain why she should not be cited for contempt for ignoring its TRO. In 2018, the Supreme Court declared as unconstitutional the DOJ directive that de Lima had invoked to bar Arroyo's travel.

In early 2013, de Lima acted on the investigation of a shootout in Atimonan, Quezon, on January 16, 2013, in which 13 men were killed at a police-military checkpoint under suspect circumstances. A probe by the National Bureau of Investigation (NBI) found it was a "rubout" rather than a legitimate shootout, rooted in a turf rivalry over illegal gambling. President Aquino approved the NBI's findings, and de Lima's DOJ filed multiple murder charges against the police and soldiers involved, including a senior police superintendent who led the operation. De Lima publicly stated that evidence showed the victims were summarily executed (none of the suspects had fired back), underscoring that the operation's apparent objective was to kill all the targets.

Her department secured the arrest of Jovito Palparan, a retired Army general accused of orchestrating the disappearance of student activists during the Arroyo administration. Palparan had been indicted in 2011 for the 2006 disappearance of Sherlyn Cadapan and Karen Empeño and had gone into hiding. In August 2014, the NBI tracked down and arrested Palparan in Manila. He was later convicted of kidnapping in 2018, after de Lima's tenure.

De Lima became best known for her role in uncovering the pork barrel scam. In 2013, she directed the DOJ and NBI to investigate allegations that businesswoman Janet Lim-Napoles had conspired with lawmakers to siphon off their discretionary funds into fake non-governmental organizations. The investigation gathered testimonies from whistleblowers and led to the filing of complaints, which were subsequently elevated to the Office of the Ombudsman for formal charges. By mid-2014, the Ombudsman indicted several prominent legislators – including senators Juan Ponce Enrile, Jinggoy Estrada, and Bong Revilla – on plunder and graft charges for allegedly funneling huge sums of public money to Napoles' bogus projects. All three senators were arrested and detained in 2014 as their cases went to trial. The DOJ's work with state auditors and the Ombudsman in the pork barrel cases was credited with "capping off" Aquino's anti-corruption drive, as it was the first time in Philippine history that multiple senior politicians were jailed pending trial for corruption. However, the pork barrel prosecutions also attracted allegations of selective justice. Critics highlighted that the charged officials were mostly from the opposition, saying that de Lima and the administration spared allies from similar scrutiny; only one political ally of Aquino's was implicated and he faced lesser offenses. De Lima responded by saying that the cases were pursued "without fear or favor" based on evidence. In August 2015, when the Supreme Court allowed Enrile (then age 91) to post bail on humanitarian grounds, de Lima openly criticized the court's decision – warning that it set a "banana republic" precedent of special treatment for the powerful.

During the 2015 Iglesia ni Cristo leadership controversy and its subsequent protests, de Lima was criticized for meddling in the internal affairs of the denomination.

== Senator (2016–2022) ==
=== Elections ===
De Lima ran as a senatorial candidate for the 2016 general elections under the Koalisyon ng Daang Matuwid (lit. 'Coalition of the Straight Road') of the Liberal Party. She finished 12th, after amassing more than 14 million votes.

In 2022, de Lima ran for reelection as senator under the Liberal Party, but lost after placing in the 23rd position (only the top 12 candidates are elected).

=== Tenure ===
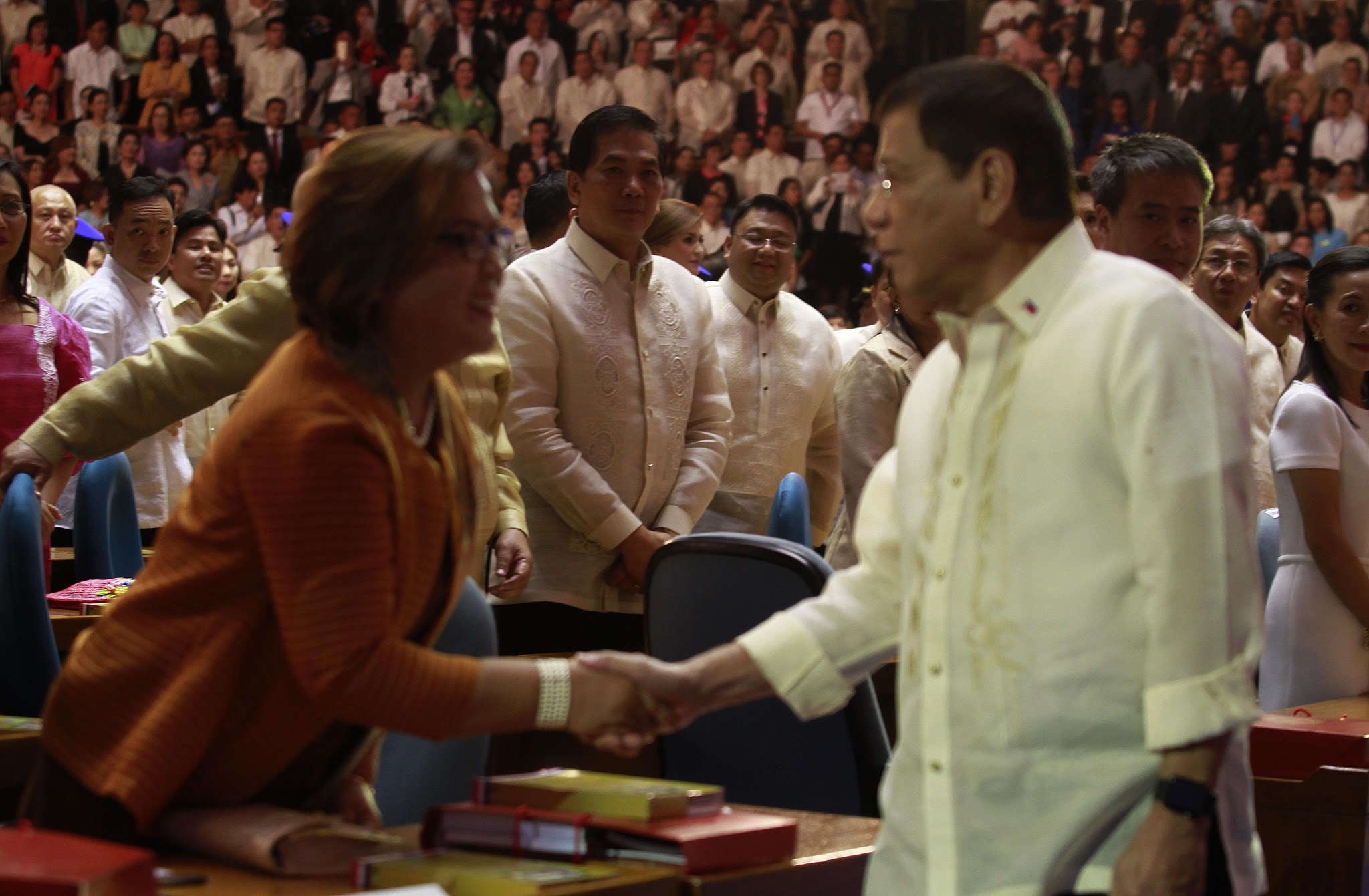
Senator de Lima shakes hands with President Rodrigo Duterte before the 2016 State of the Nation Address.

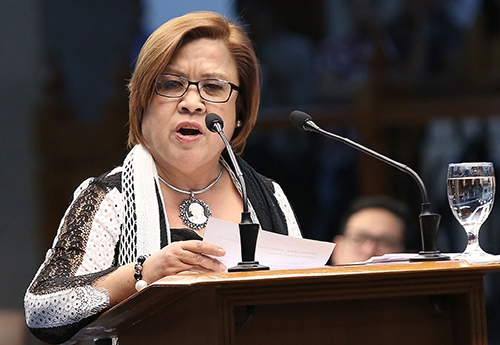
Senator de Lima delivering a privilege speech condemning the drug war, 2016.

De Lima condemned the Philippine drug war and urged Congress to investigate. In a privilege speech before the Senate on August 2, 2016, she called for an end to vigilante killings of drug suspects. De Lima lamented the indifference of President Rodrigo Duterte's government to extrajudicial killings and warned that more innocent people will suffer if the killings fail to stop.

De Lima chaired the Philippine Senate Committee on Justice and Human Rights. On August 22, 2016, she opened a Senate inquiry on extrajudicial killings and police operations under the drug war.

== Imprisonment and trial (2017–2024) ==
On August 17, 2016, Philippine president Rodrigo Duterte alleged that de Lima was having an affair with her driver, Ronnie Dayan, who Duterte also alleged functioned as de Lima's collector for drug protection money when she was justice secretary. Duterte also alleged that Dayan had been using drugs. Duterte later claimed that he had in his possession wiretaps and ATM records which confirmed his allegations which he had received from an unnamed foreign country. In September 2016, de Lima was removed as chair of the Senate Justice and Human Rights committee investigating extrajudicial killings. She later admitted that she had a relationship with Dayan many years ago. Justice secretary Vitaliano Aguirre called on convicted drug lords, former prison officials and police officers as prime witnesses against de Lima in a congressional probe on illegal drug trafficking in the New Bilibid Prison. Dayan went into hiding after being advised by de Lima to not attend the House probe, but was captured days later.

Rolando Espinosa, then-mayor of Albuera, Leyte, corroborated allegations that de Lima benefited from the illegal drug activities of his son Kerwin in Eastern Visayas. Included in the mayor's affidavit was a picture of de Lima with Kerwin Espinosa in Baguio. Kerwin Espinosa later testified that he gave her a total of ₱8 million to help finance her senatorial campaign in 2016.

On July 19, 2019, the PNP–Criminal Investigation and Detection Group (CIDG) filed charges against de Lima and other members of the opposition for "sedition, cyber libel, libel, estafa, harboring a criminal, and obstruction of justice". On February 10, 2020, she was cleared of all charges.

=== Retracted testimonies ===
In late April 2022, Kerwin Espinosa recanted his statements on the case, and said that he was coerced by the police after his father was killed in jail. The Department of Justice downplayed his recantation, saying it did not affect their case against de Lima, as he was not a witness. In October 2024, Espinosa testified before the House of Representatives that former police chief Bato dela Rosa forced him to link de Lima to the drug trade.

In early May 2022, Rafael Ragos, former Bureau of Corrections director general and another witness in de Lima's drug case, recanted his testimony. Ragos previously testified that de Lima accepted ₱5 million from him via drug lord Peter Co, while she was Secretary of Justice, and that it was later used to fund her senatorial campaign in 2016. Ragos alleged that Justice Secretary Vitaliano Aguirre II coerced him to lie to implicate de Lima. Aguirre denied the accusation.

Co-accused Ronnie Dayan also recanted his testimony in May 2022. Dayan alleged that Representative Reynaldo Umali had coerced him to lie in his 2016 testimony in Congress.

In October 2023, former police officers PMaj. Rodolfo Magleo and PSgt. Nonilo Arile retracted their testimonies against de Lima.

=== Detention and legal proceedings ===
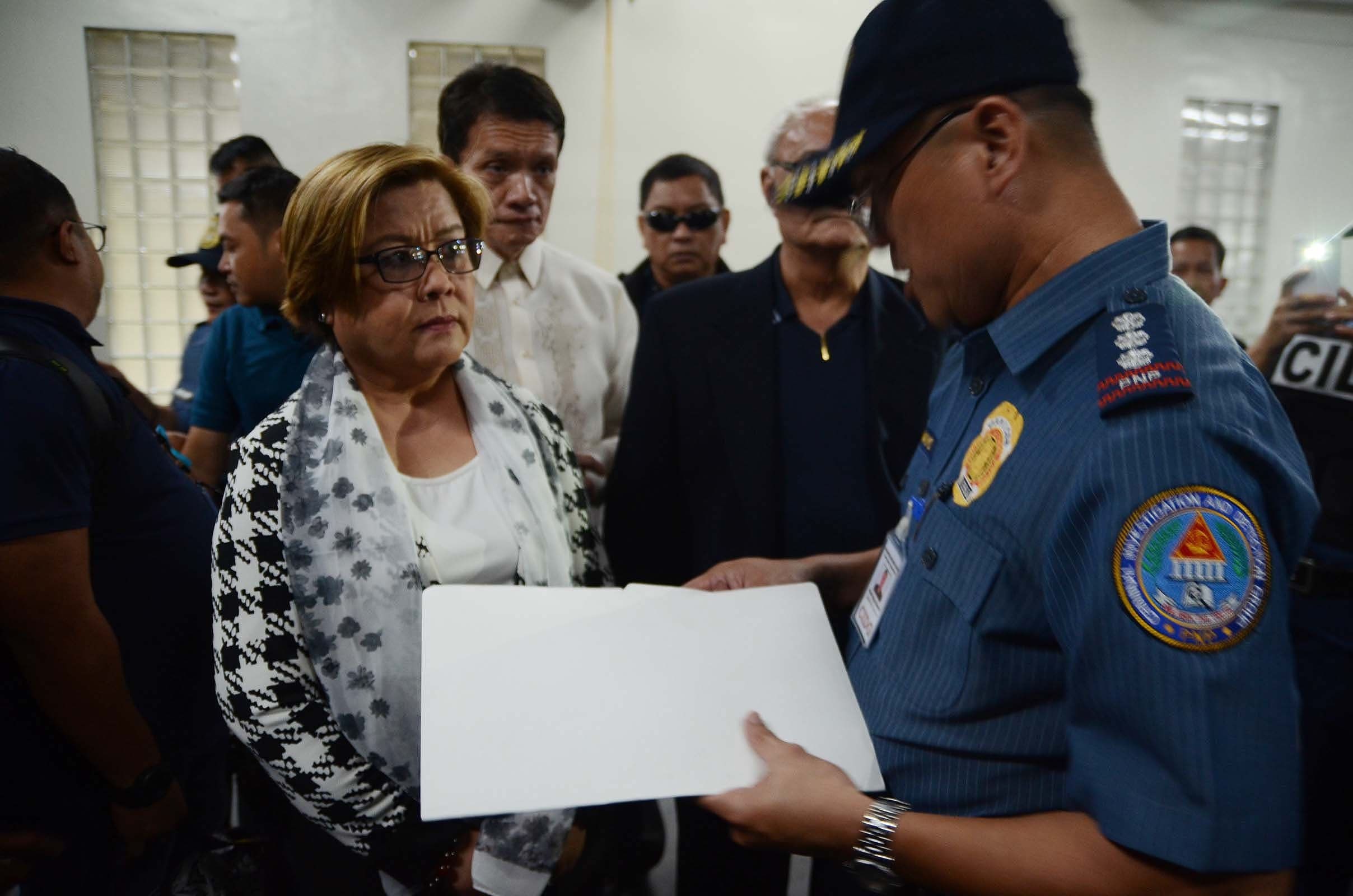
Senator Leila de Lima listens to a PNP-CIDG officer who served the warrant for her arrest at the Senate grounds in Pasay, February 24, 2017.

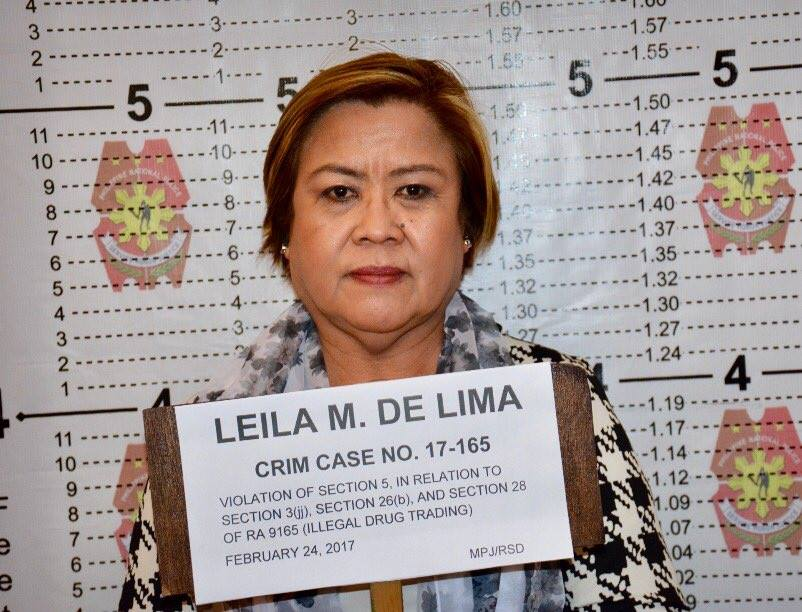
Mug shot of Leila de Lima after her arrest by the Philippine National Police on February 24, 2017.

On February 17, 2017, a court pressed drug-related charges against de Lima. On February 23, the Muntinlupa Regional Trial Court issued an arrest warrant against de Lima for allegedly violating the drug trafficking law. De Lima faced drug related cases for allegedly using her position as Secretary of Justice to acquire money from drug pushers to make their drug business operational even though they were imprisoned. De Lima turned herself in the following morning of February 24, 2017. She was referred to as a 'prisoner of conscience' by numerous international human rights organizations.

On February 5, 2018, the Ombudsman of the Philippines cleared de Lima from all charges of financial terrorism and violation of the anti-graft law. On February 20, during the World Day of Social Justice, all ethics complaints filed against de Lima were thrown out by the Philippine Senate.

On March 3, 2018, de Lima sought the approval of the court to let her attend the impending impeachment trial against Chief Justice Maria Lourdes Sereno. On March 10, a court approved de Lima's medical furlough due to problems in her liver. On March 13, the self-confessed drug lords were freed by the government due to 'lack of evidence'. On April 5, Justice Secretary Vitaliano Aguirre II, who initiated de Lima's imprisonment, resigned after evidences on corruption surfaced to media attention, along with his acquittal of the self-confessed drug lords.

On May 28, 2018, the Muntinlupa court denied de Lima's plea to attend the law graduation of her youngest son, Vincent. The court stated that de Lima 'cannot be given a different treatment as that of other prisoners'. On May 30, de Lima filed a motion to reconsider her plea to attend her son's graduation, citing convicted plunderer and ex-senator Jinggoy Estrada, who was allowed by the Sandiganbayan to attend his son's graduation in 2015. Hours before her son's graduation on June 3, Presiding Judge Amelia Fabros-Corpuz of the Muntinlupa Regional Trial Court Branch 205 rejected de Lima's motion for reconsideration in attending to her son's law graduation.

On October 29, 2018, de Lima filed with Ombudsman Samuel Martires complaints against Vitaliano Aguirre II and Menardo Guevarra for violation of section 10(f) of RA 6981, the "Witness Protection, Security and Benefit Act." The Ombudsman, however, in 2019 and 2020, dismissed the complaints which were reversed. In 2023, the Court of Appeals remanded the case. Accordingly, De Lima pleaded for the investigation of her cases.

On June 6, the Supreme Court of the Philippines upheld the 'constitutionality' of de Lima's arrest based on drug charges filed by Aguirre, blasting calls from international human rights organizations. The court added that 'no further pleadings will be entertained', effectively blocking all remedies for release. On August 6, the Supreme Court denied de Lima's plea to allow her to join the Senate debates regarding Duterte's initiative to withdraw the Philippines from the International Criminal Court. On August 10, 18 months after her imprisonment, de Lima was finally arraigned in the drug cases established by the Department of Justice.

On August 3, Ronnie Dayan formally refused to testify against her alleged 'disobedience case'.

On October 8, 2022, de Lima survived an attempted hostage taking inside Camp Crame after detainees said to be linked with the Abu Sayyaf Group stabbed a police officer. Police reported that de Lima was safe and that the officer was hospitalized.

The leader of the hostage-takers, Abu Sayyaf terrorist Anduljihad "Idang" Susukan, was delivered in August 2020 to Mayor Sara Duterte in Davao City by MNLF leader Nur Misuari, flying in from Jolo, Sulu in a private jet.

Thereafter, the Duterte Administration ordered Susukan to be detained at the PNP Custodial Center in Camp Crame, the same detention center where De Lima was imprisoned. Susukan was kept in Camp Crame until the day he attempted to take De Lima hostage with two other Abu Sayyaf members.

=== Recognition and calls for release ===
On March 16, 2017, the European Parliament condemned the wave of killings in the Philippines and called for de Lima's release. It expressed "serious concerns that the offences Senator de Lima has been charged with are almost entirely fabricated". Amnesty International regards de Lima as a "prisoner of conscience". Despite her imprisonment, de Lima continued to oppose the policies of Duterte and remained a member of the Philippine Senate and the Liberal Party.

On March 29, 2018, Human Rights Watch (HRW) and the Inter-Parliamentary Union (IPU) called for de Lima's release due to the insufficiency of evidence filed against her.

In late July 2017, de Lima was visited by members of the European Parliament and the Liberal International. In September, the Council of Asian Liberals and Democrats (CALD) demanded de Lima's immediate release and the restoration of human rights in the Philippines. In the same month, de Lima's ally in the Senate, Risa Hontiveros, caught justice secretary Vitaliano Aguirre II drafting fabricated charges against her through text messages during a hearing on the deaths of minors caused by the Philippine drug war. The same tactic was used by him against de Lima, which led to her arrest. In November 2017, de Lima was awarded the Prize for Freedom by Liberal International, becoming the second Filipino to receive the prestigious award after Corazon Aquino. She formally accepted the prize in absentia on July 28, 2018. On December 5, 2017, she was again awarded with the Leading Global Thinker award by Foreign Policy for the second consecutive year.

On February 1, 2018, de Lima topped Asian Correspondent's list of five prominent Southeast Asian leaders and human rights defenders who are facing charges for defying the norm. On February 3, de Lima was dubbed as the "conscience of our time" by an independent news agency. On February 20, the ASEAN Parliamentarians for Human Rights (APHR) called for de Lima's immediate and unconditional release and cited her 'heroism' against corruption and autocracy. It was followed by the Senate minority bloc, liberal members of the House of Representatives, and Amnesty International pushing anew for her release. On April 20, de Lima was named by Fortune magazine as one of the 'World's 50 Greatest Leaders' for 2018. On May 29, Amnesty International conferred to de Lima its first ever Most Distinguished Human Rights Defender award during the Ignite Awards for Human Rights. She was also declared one of the world's "Women Human Rights Defenders Under Threat". On de Lima's birthday on August 27, Amnesty International called for the dropping of charges again, adding that she is a 'prisoner of conscience'. Opposition lawmakers also called for her release.

On June 5, 2020, Amnesty International called on Philippine authorities to unconditionally release de Lima. It also called for them to end unreasonable restrictions imposed on her; permit communication with her family, lawyers, staff and doctors; and allow her to undertake her role as an elected legislator and a human rights defender.

=== Statements from detention ===
Since October 2017, de Lima released numerous statements while in prison condemning the death toll of the Philippine drug war which by then had killed 14,000 people, mostly minors.

In her 94th letter while in prison on May 29, 2018, de Lima stated "People choose to be passive, perhaps because they feel responsible for voting for him—but no. You are not responsible for what he does after you vote for him. You are, however, responsible for letting him get away with things like this with your silence. By electing him, he has not bought your souls and conscience—on the contrary, he now owes you his accountability."

=== Court decisions ===
People of the Philippines v. De Lima, et al.
- Court: Muntinlupa Regional Trial Court
- Branch: 204 (17-165); 205 (17-166); 206 (17-167)
Full case name
People of the Philippines v. Leila M. De Lima and Ronnie Paloc Dayan (17-165)
People of the Philippines v. Leila De Lima y Magistrado and Jose Adrian Tiamson Dera aka "Jad de Vera" and "Jad" (17-166)
People of the Philippines v. Leila M. De Lima, Franklin Jesus B. Bucayu, Wilfredo G. Elli, Jaybee Niño Manicad Sebastian, Ronnie Paloc Dayan, Joenel Tan Sanchez and Jose Adrian Tamson Dera (17-167)
- Decided: May 17, 2023 (17-165); February 17, 2021 (17-166); June 24, 2024 (17-167)
- Verdict: Not guilty: Conspiracy to commit drug trading
- Citation: Criminal Case Nos. 17-165, 17-166 and 17-167
- Ponente: Abraham Joseph Alcantara (17-165); Liezel Aquiatan (17-166); Gener Gito (17-167)

On January 5, 2022, the Ombudsman dismissed bribery complaints filed in 2018 against de Lima and Ronnie Dayan, citing lack of probable cause to indict the two, in connection with accusations that de Lima received a total of ₱8 million from Kerwin Espinosa, allegedly through Dayan, on four separate occasions in 2015–2016. The ruling was only made public in August.

On May 27, 2022, Muntinlupa Regional Trial Court Branch 206 dismissed the petition to cite de Lima and her legal counsel, Filibon Tacardon, in indirect contempt over their statements on the testimonies of prosecution witnesses, citing lack of merit and rendering other pending incidents as moot and academic.

=== Release on bail and acquittal ===
On November 13, 2023, Muntinlupa RTC Branch 206 Judge Gener Gito granted de Lima's petition for bail on her remaining drug charge, guaranteeing her release after six years in detention. She was released from Camp Crame that evening after paying a bond of ₱300,000.

Following her release, de Lima held a press conference at Novotel Manila Araneta City in Quezon City, during which she stated that she forgave Duterte but was considering whether to file counter-complaints regarding the accusations against her. After staying overnight in Quezon City, she then went on a pilgrimage to Manaoag, Pangasinan, the next day and reunited with her family in Iriga on November 15.

On June 24, 2024, Judge Gito granted de Lima's petition for demurrer to evidence on her third and last charge involving her alleged conspiracy in the illegal drug trade in the New Bilibid Prison, eventually dismissing the case and acquitting her from all criminal cases.

On the same day, the Quezon City RTC Branch 76, granting her petition for certiorari against the Metropolitan Trial Court, dismissed two disobedience cases against her, which was filed for defying, along with Dayan, the House inquiry into the said drug trade. De Lima was reportedly detained for 2,321 days, longer than the penalty for disobedience—with the maximum of six months.

In May 2025, the Court of Appeals voided de Lima's acquittal in 2023 but let her remain free while it remanded the case to the Muntinlupa RTC Branch 204 and ordered the judge to write a new decision, resulting in an acquittal the following month. An attempt by the Department of Justice panel of prosecutors led by Ramoncito Ocampo to appeal the decision was criticized by Justice Secretary Jesus Crispin Remulla for "following a political agenda, not a legal agenda", instructing Prosecutor General Richard Fadullon to "stop the foolishness of these people under us". On July 23, 2025, Ocampo and the prosecutor panel withdrew their filed motion, and by September 30, Judge Abraham Alcantara of RTC Branch 204 granted their withdrawal, deeming the court's drug case against de Lima and Dayan "closed and terminated".

== Post-imprisonment (since 2024) ==
On December 4, 2023, de Lima was designated as the official spokesperson of the Liberal Party (LP / Liberal), having previously been its vice president for policy, platform, and advocacy. On December 13, she announced that she would serve as a professor of De La Salle University's Tañada-Diokno School of Law starting in January 2024, marking her return to teaching law.

In early January 2025, as the United States House of Representatives prepared to vote on a bill sanctioning the International Criminal Court (ICC) for issuing an arrest warrant to Israeli prime minister Benjamin Netanyahu, de Lima signed a letter alongside 27 other individuals requesting US congressmen to vote "no", arguing that the ICC's other investigations might be affected if sanctions are issued, such as the investigation into the Philippine drug war of former president Rodrigo Duterte.

When International Criminal Court judges said that the mental capacities of Duterte cannot be an obstacle his trial in The Hague, Leila de Lima said: "This ruling tells victims that in the reckoning of Duterte at the ICC, their voices will not be sidelined by technical evasions".

== House of Representatives of the Philippines (since 2025) ==
=== Election ===
On September 20, 2024, de Lima accepted the lead nomination for the Mamamayang Liberal, the sectoral wing of the Liberal Party, for the 2025 Philippine House of Representatives elections, marking her return to national politics. Her co-nominees included former representatives Teddy Baguilat and Erin Tañada. Following the election on May 12, 2025, the party-list attained enough votes to secure a seat in the lower chamber, making de Lima a member-elect of the party-list for the 20th Congress. On her election, de Lima affirmed that she will sit as a "fiscalizer" in an "independent opposition". While she has expressed her openness to joining the majority bloc allied with President Bongbong Marcos, she stated that she would prefer joining a minority or an independent minority bloc.

=== Tenure ===
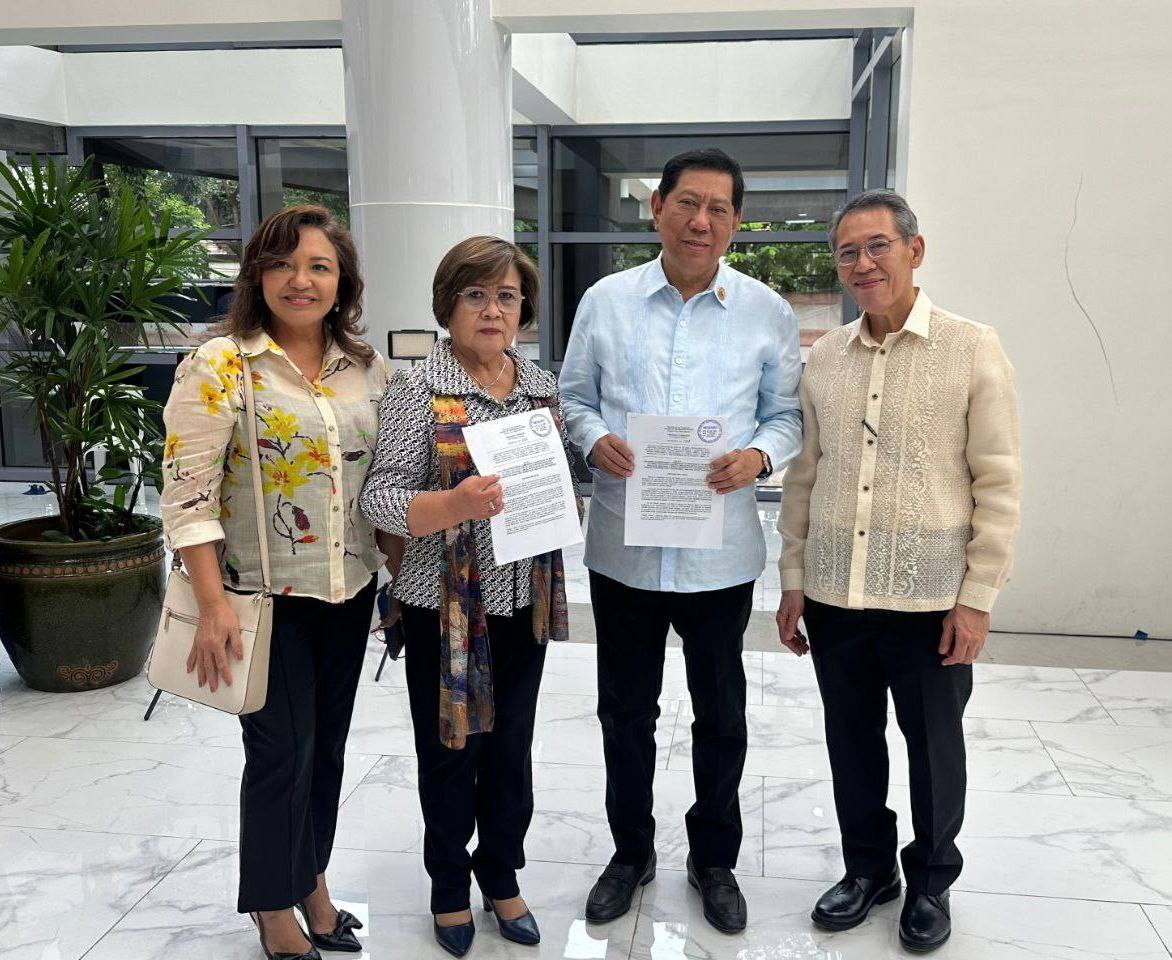
De Lima (second from the left) files a bill with fellow representatives Krisel Lagman, Edgar Erice, and Chel Diokno to establish the Independent Commission for Infrastructure, September 9, 2025.

On May 14, 2025, House Speaker Martin Romualdez invited de Lima as well as fellow representative-elect Chel Diokno to serve in the prosecution panel in the first impeachment of Sara Duterte. The invitation was seconded by Representatives Joel Chua (Manila–3rd) and Jay Khonghun (Zambales–1st), who noted the "background and legal expertise" of de Lima as being beneficial to the panel. She accepted the invitation, citing her commitment to "duty and principle" and affirming non-partisanship in her role, in a move that her colleagues regarded as a "boost" to the panel.

On September 9, 2025, de Lima and 12 other lawmakers filed House Bill No. 4453, which seeks to address the limited powers of the Independent Commission for Infrastructure (ICI) by granting it broader powers in investigating the massive flood control projects scandal.

On October 7, 2025, de Lima and 15 other legislators filed House Resolution No. 342, which called on the Department of Foreign Affairs to enact "bolder initiatives" to address Myanmar's humanitarian crisis amidst its ongoing civil war, such as condemning the then-upcoming 2025–26 Myanmar elections and engaging with the exiled National Unity Government, to protect human rights and to further the "restoration of democracy, justice, and regional stability".

On March 3, 2026, de Lima was elected as the Senior Deputy Minority Leader of the House of Representatives, replacing Caloocan's second district representative Edgar Erice.

On May 12, 2026, De Lima was elected to serve on the prosecution panel for the second impeachment of Sara Duterte.

== Political positions ==
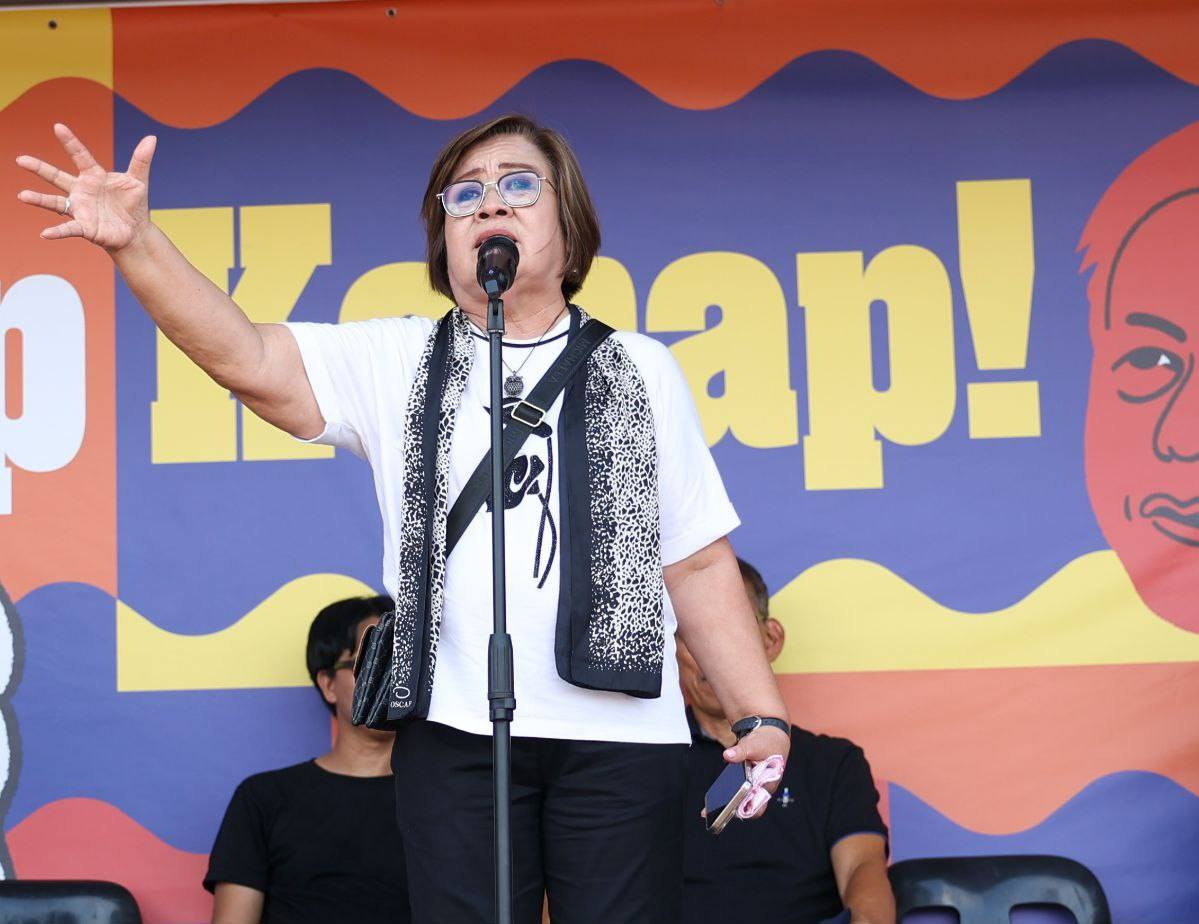
De Lima addresses the Baha sa Luneta protest at Rizal Park, Manila, September 21, 2025.

De Lima was unable to vote against the congressional vote on extending martial law in Mindanao following the Battle of Marawi in 2017 because of her detention. In December 2017, de Lima criticized Duterte for his pivot to China, citing what happened in Sri Lanka, Myanmar, Malaysia, and Cambodia, where those countries were put by China in a debt trap after accepting Chinese loans, leading to China's economic control on those countries.

In January 2018, de Lima criticized Duterte after it was revealed that the national debt ballooned to ₱6.6 trillion and the debt-to-GDP ratio expanded into 36.4%. She also criticized the government for 'bowing down' to China amidst the South China Sea dispute and Chinese exploration in the Benham Rise.

De Lima sought Senate inquiries regarding the terms of loans of the government's infrastructure program, which indebted the country rapidly within a few months, and the anti-money laundering law compliance after the Ombudsman dropped all money laundering cases against Duterte due to his administration's threats. On April 4, de Lima filed a dismissal for the ouster petition filed against Chief Justice Maria Lourdes Sereno. On May 13, de Lima joined liberal senators in condemning Sereno's ouster through a quo warranto petition, which de Lima said was an unconstitutional way to oust an impeachable officer.

On June 1, de Lima filed a resolution seeking to probe blacklisted Chinese firms that were accepted by the Duterte administration in the rehabilitation of Marawi despite being banned by the World Bank due to corrupt practices. On June 3, de Lima filed a resolution seeking to probe the state-sponsored immigration of Chinese citizens into the Philippines which caused the unemployment of Filipinos. On June 5, de Lima called solicitor-general Jose Calida, who had helped spearhead her arrest, as a 'role model in government corruption' after reports of a multi-million peso corruption scandal involving him surfaced.

On July 25, de Lima wrote a letter expressing her dismay on the ascension of Duterte ally and former president Gloria Macapagal-Arroyo, as House Speaker. She added that Arroyo's rise to power via unconstitutional means has led to the rise of the country's 'true minority'. On July 31, de Lima called on Congress to pass a bill seeking to prohibit premature campaigning in elections. On August 28, she also pushed for a bill that seeks to increase the pension of qualified indigent senior citizens. She also sought the passage of the Pedestrian Safety Act.

On August 1, de Lima welcomed the indictment against Pork barrel scam mastermind Janet Lim-Napoles. On August 4, de Lima and other senators spearheaded the need to probe the conditions of displaced persons in war-torn areas of Mindanao, notably in Marawi. On August 7, de Lima pushed for the passage of the calamity leave bill, which would provide 5 days of calamity leave for workers. On August 11, de Lima filed a bill on incentivizing the use of solar energy in households. On the same day, she joined other senators in calling for a ban on single-occupancy vehicles on EDSA. On August 18, de Lima expressed the need to probe the Bureau of Immigration's ₱869-million loss from express lane fees.

On August 24, minority senators called on the Supreme Court to allow de Lima to be present during the ICC withdrawal case through video conference. On August 25, de Lima called for a Senate probe into delays in the free irrigation law's mandated implementing rules and regulations. On August 30, de Lima filed a bill that would raise the statutory age of rape to 18.

== Writings ==
On February 22, 2018, de Lima announced that she would launch an e-book, entitled, Dispatches from Crame I on February 23, a day before the anniversary of her incarceration. On February 23, the e-book was officially launched at the office of the Commission on Human Rights in Quezon City. It contained all the statements and letters written by her since she her imprisonment in 2017. It also contained statements from her supporters from various local and international organizations and personalities.

On June 1, 2018, a book by de Lima's spiritual adviser, Fr. Robert Reyes, entitled, Prisoner of Conscience Prisoner of Hope, was launched, containing various accounts from different personalities giving their views of and conversations with de Lima during her incarceration.

On de Lima's birthday on August 27, 2018, she released her second book, entitled, Fight for Freedom and Other Writings, which collects her speeches, letters, and notes, as well as letters of support from prominent personalities such as Vice President Leni Robredo, former Hong Kong Legislative Council Member Emily Lau, and Liberal International President Juli Minoves.

== Personal life ==
De Lima was previously married for more than thirty years to lawyer Plaridel Bohol, who was her classmate in college, before their marriage was annulled. She has two children.

De Lima's father, Vicente de Lima used to be a commissioner of the Commission on Elections during the time of Christian Monsod. Her aunt, Lilia de Lima, served as the head of the Philippine Economic Zone Authority and is a Ramon Magsaysay Awardee.

Following her release, de Lima adopted five cats from Camp Crame who accompanied her constantly during her detention.

== Electoral history ==
Electoral history of Leila de Lima
Year	Office	Party	Votes received				Result
Year	Office	Party	Total	%	P.	Swing	Result
2016	Senator of the Philippines	Liberal	14,144,070	31.45%	12th	—N/a	Won
2022	Senator of the Philippines	Liberal	7,278,602	13.10%	23rd	-18.35	Lost
2025	Representative (Party-list)	ML	547,949	1.31%	14th	—N/a	Won

== Honors and recognition ==
- MetroBank Foundation Professorial Chair for Public Service and Governance (2010)
- Excellent Public Servant Award (2010)
- Defender of People's Rights (2010)
- "Agent of Change" Award (2010)
- Most Outstanding Alumna Award 2010 by San Beda University
- Most Outstanding Alumna Award 2011 by San Beda University
- 2016 Global Thinker Award by Foreign Policy
- Top Most Influential People for 2017 by Time Magazine
- Women Human Rights Defenders for 2017 by Amnesty International
- The 2017 Prize For Freedom by Liberal International.
- 2017 Leading Global Thinker Award
- World's 50 Greatest Leaders for 2018 by Fortune Magazine
- 2018 Southeast Asia's Women to Watch by The Diplomat
- 2018 Most Distinguished Human Rights Defender Award by Amnesty International
- 2018 Women Human Rights Defenders Under Threat recognized by Amnesty International
- 2018 Human Rights Defenders recognized at the Human Rights Defender World Summit in Paris

== See also ==
- List of Filipino Nobel laureates and nominees

Political offices
Preceded by Alberto Agra as Acting Secretary of Justice	Secretary of Justice; 2010–2015	Succeeded by Alfredo Caguioa as Acting Secretary of Justice
Preceded by Purificacion Quisumbing	Chairperson of the Philippine Commission on Human Rights; 2008–2010	Succeeded by Etta Rosales
Senate of the Philippines
Preceded by Aquilino Pimentel III	Chair of the Philippine Senate Electoral Reforms and People's Participation Committee; 2016–2018	Succeeded by Aquilino Pimentel III
Preceded by Aquilino Pimentel III	Chair of the Philippine Senate; Justice and Human Rights Committee; 2016	Succeeded by Richard J. Gordon
House of Representatives of the Philippines
New office	Member of the House of Representatives from Mamamayang Liberal; 2025–present	Incumbent
Party political offices
Preceded by Kiko Pangilinan	Chairperson of the Liberal Party; 2026–present	Incumbent
