= Mamamayang Liberal =

Philippine sectoral organization of the Liberal Party

- — Philippine partylist —
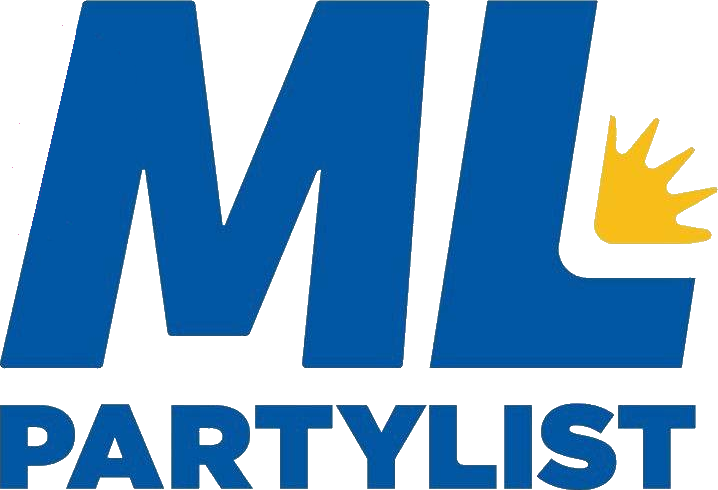
- Abbreviation: ML
- President: Teddy Baguilat
- Secretary general: Jobelle Joan Domingo
- Type: Sectoral organization
- Sector(s) represented: Multi-sector
- Founded: 2024; 2 years ago
- Ideology: Social liberalism
- National affiliation: Liberal

Current representation (20th Congress)
- Seats in the House of Representatives: 1 / 3 (Out of 63 Partylist seats)
- Representative(s): Leila de Lima

Mamamayang Liberal (ML; lit. 'Liberal citizens'), also known as the ML Partylist, is a political organization which has party-list representation in the House of Representatives of the Philippines.

== History ==
Mamamayang Liberal (ML) was formed as the sectoral organization of the Liberal Party to cater to marginalized groups. ML ran for the 2025 elections as a party-list organization largely relying on the supporter base of Liberal and former 2022 presidential candidate Leni Robredo. It received accreditation as a regional sectoral organization from the Commission on Elections (COMELEC) in July 2024.

ML has listed former senator Leila de Lima as their first nominee. Aside from advancing the interest of various marginalized sectors, ML pledged to reform the partylist system if they win a seat.

== Sectors represented ==
ML names workers, farmers, fisherfolk, indigenous peoples, urban poor, women, youth, professionals, and members of the LGBTQ community as the sectors they represent.

== Electoral results ==
Election	Votes	%	Secured Seats	Party-List Seats	Congress	Representative
2025	547,949	1.31%	1 / 3	63	20th Congress; 2025–2028	Leila de Lima
Note: A party-list group, can win a maximum of three seats in the House of Representatives.
