= Menardo Guevarra =

Former Solicitor General of the Philippines

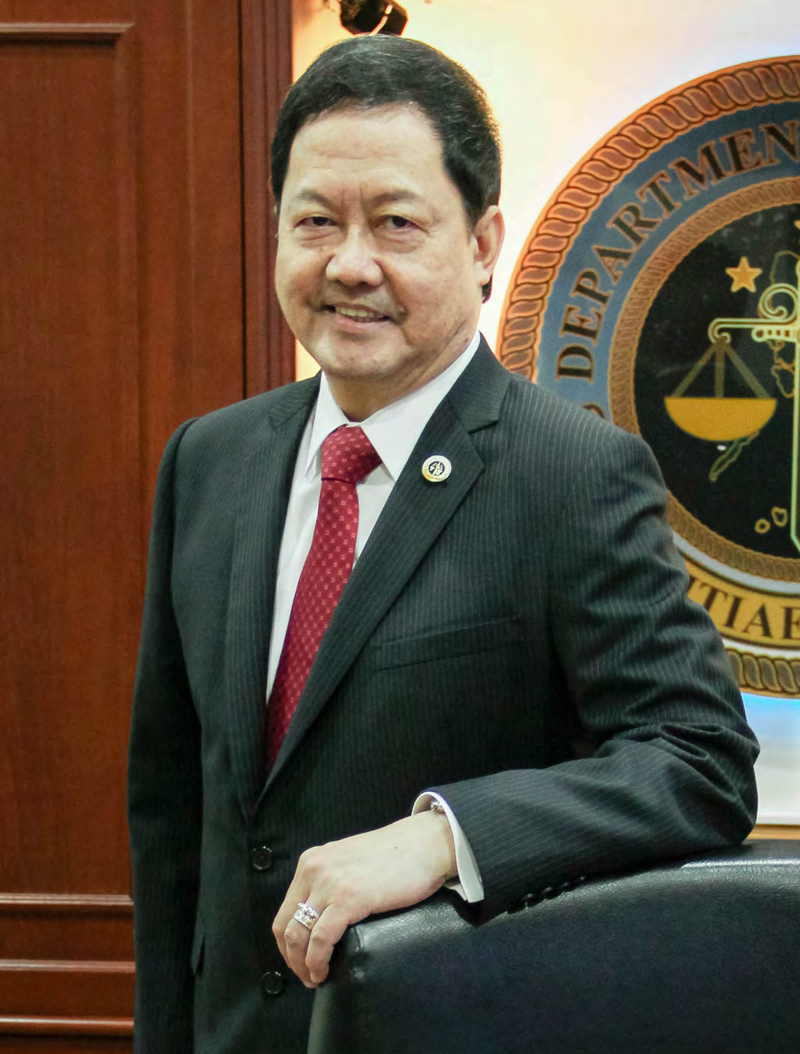
- Guevarra as Justice Secretary

Solicitor General of the Philippines
- In office June 30, 2022 – May 29, 2025
- President: Bongbong Marcos
- Preceded by: Jose Calida
- Succeeded by: Darlene Berberabe

58th Secretary of Justice
- In office April 5, 2018 – June 30, 2022
- President: Rodrigo Duterte
- Preceded by: Vitaliano Aguirre II
- Succeeded by: Jesus Crispin Remulla

Deputy Executive Secretary
- In office June 30, 2016 – April 4, 2018
- President: Rodrigo Duterte
- Succeeded by: Michael P. Ong
- In office May 27, 2015 – January 31, 2016
- President: Benigno S. Aquino III
- Preceded by: Michael G. Aguinaldo

Commissioner of the Philippine Competition Commission
- In office February 1, 2016 – June 30, 2016
- President: Benigno S. Aquino III

Personal details
- Born: Menardo Ilasco Guevarra; May 23, 1954 (age 72) Meycauayan, Bulacan, Philippines
- Spouse: Cynthia
- Children: 4
- Education: Ateneo de Manila University (AB, LL.B); University of the Philippines Diliman (M.Econ)
- Profession: Lawyer, Professor, Civil Servant

Menardo Ilasco Guevarra (born May 23, 1954) is a Filipino lawyer who served as Solicitor General of the Philippines from 2022 to 2025 under President Bongbong Marcos. He previously served as the Secretary of Justice under President Rodrigo Duterte and as a commissioner of the Philippine Competition Commission under President Benigno Aquino III. Before joining the government, he was involved in private litigation practice as a founding partner of the Medialdea Ata Bello Guevarra & Suarez law firm since 1990. He was also an active faculty member at his alma mater Ateneo de Manila University, where he graduated in 1974.

== Early life and education ==
Guevarra was born on May 23, 1954, in Malhacan, Meycauayan, Bulacan. He attended Meycauayan College, formerly Meycauayan Institute, and completed his secondary education in 1970. After high school, Guevarra moved to Manila to study at Ateneo de Manila University, where he majored in political science and graduated magna cum laude in 1974. He then enrolled at the University of the Philippines Diliman and completed his master's degree in economics in 1977.

Guevarra then served as a staff economist at the National Economic and Development Authority and the Bangko Sentral ng Pilipinas while pursuing his law degree at the Ateneo de Manila Law School. He obtained his LL.B. degree in 1985, graduating with Second Honors, and placed second in the Philippine Bar Examination in the same year. He also underwent an intensive practical training in Maritime and Admiralty law at the Steamship Mutual Underwriting Association (Bermuda) Limited in London, U.K. in 1999.

== Career ==
Guevarra first worked as an economist after finishing his master's degree in economics in 1977. He joined the National Economic and Development Authority in 1977 and served as a staff economist until 1983. He was then hired by Bangko Sentral ng Pilipinas as a bank economist under its Department of Economic Research from 1983 to 1986. Guevarra's first legal job was as part of the technical staff of the Philippine Constitutional Commission of 1986 hired by the government of President Corazon Aquino to draft the 1987 Constitution of the Philippines.

Guevarra started his private law practice as an associate of the Ponce Enrile Cayetano Bautista Picazo & Reyes (PECABAR) Law Offices in Makati in 1987. In 1990, he formed his own law partnership firm based in Ortigas Center which would later be known as the Medialdea Ata Bello Guevarra & Suarez (MABGS) law offices, now simply Medialdea Bello Suarez (MBS). Since 1990, Guevarra had also been teaching at his alma mater Ateneo de Manila University as a member of the Law School faculty. He taught a broad range of subjects, including Property, Civil Procedure and Evidence.

Guevarra's work as a private lawyer for more than thirty years involved thousands of cases concerning contract disputes, family and property relations, intra-corporate controversies, tax appeals, criminal actions, and legal representation in various regulatory agencies. His clients included well-known personalities such as Sharon Cuneta and Rodrigo Duterte. While teaching at the Ateneo Law School, he was also a lecturer in the Mandatory Continuing Legal Education (MCLE) program of the Supreme Court of the Philippines. He also served as Accredited Arbitrator of the Philippine Dispute Resolution Center, the arbitration arm of the Philippine Chamber of Commerce and Industry.

=== Aquino administration ===
Guevarra returned to government service in September 2010 when he was appointed by President Benigno Aquino III to the five-member Philippine Truth Commission formed to investigate the alleged corruption scandals of the previous Gloria Macapagal Arroyo administration. The commission headed by former Chief Justice Hilario Davide Jr. was abolished in 2011 after the Supreme Court declared it as unconstitutional. Guevarra then assumed the position of deputy executive secretary for legal affairs under Aquino's executive secretary and his law school classmate Paquito Ochoa Jr. in May 2015. He also served briefly as a commissioner of the Philippine Competition Commission in February 2016 until the end of Aquino's term in June 2016.

As an Aquino appointee, Guevarra was also involved in the Philippines v. China arbitration case at the Permanent Court of Arbitration in The Hague, Netherlands as a member of the Philippine legal team. He also sat briefly as an ex-officio member of the Judicial and Bar Council. On June 30, 2016, upon the assumption of Rodrigo Duterte as President of the Philippines, Guevarra returned to the deputy executive secretary portfolio under his former law partner Salvador Medialdea. Concurrent to his executive department service, he also served in the board of trustees of the Development Academy of the Philippines and as representative of the office of the president in the board of directors of the Subic Bay Metropolitan Authority.

=== Justice secretary ===
Guevarra was appointed ad interim justice secretary on April 5, 2018, replacing Vitaliano Aguirre II. In a speech before the employees of the Department of Justice on his first day at the department on April 16, 2018, Guevarra said it was his personal mission to "restore the dignified and respectable image" of the Justice department, after it was hounded by controversial cases under his predecessor. His appointment was confirmed by the Commission on Appointments in May 2018.

=== Solicitor General ===
On June 17, 2022, President-elect Bongbong Marcos nominated Guevarra as the next solicitor general, of which he was sworn in on the role on July 1, 2022, following the Inauguration of Bongbong Marcos as president.

In a bid to prevent the Arrest of Rodrigo Duterte for the International Criminal Court in March 2025, Duterte's associates filed a petition before the Supreme Court. The high court denied immediate relief but will still consider the merits of the case. Guevara decided to recuse the office of the solicitor general in its manifestation; abstaining from representing the respondents from the Marcos administration. The act caused calls for him to resign.

== Legal issue ==
On October 29, 2018, Senator Leila de Lima filed with Ombudsman Samuel Martires complaints against Justice Secretary Vitaliano Aguirre II and Guevarra for violation of section 10(f) of RA 6981, the "Witness Protection, Security, and Benefit Act". The Ombudsman, however, in 2019 and 2020, dismissed the complaints, which were reversed—"This case is remanded to the Office of the Ombudsman for appropriate action," Justice Raymond Reynold Lauigan, CA Special 17th Division, ruled in a decision dated November 21, 2023. Accordingly, De Lima pleaded for the investigation of her cases.

== Personal life ==
Guevarra is married to Cynthia with whom he has four children.

Political offices
Preceded by Vitaliano Aguirre II	Secretary of Justice; 2018–2022	Succeeded by Jesus Crispin Remulla
Preceded by Jose Calida	Solicitor General of the Philippines; 2022–2025	Succeeded by Darlene Berberabe
