= Alfredo Benjamin Caguioa =

Filipino judge

Alfredo Benjamin Caguioa GCrL
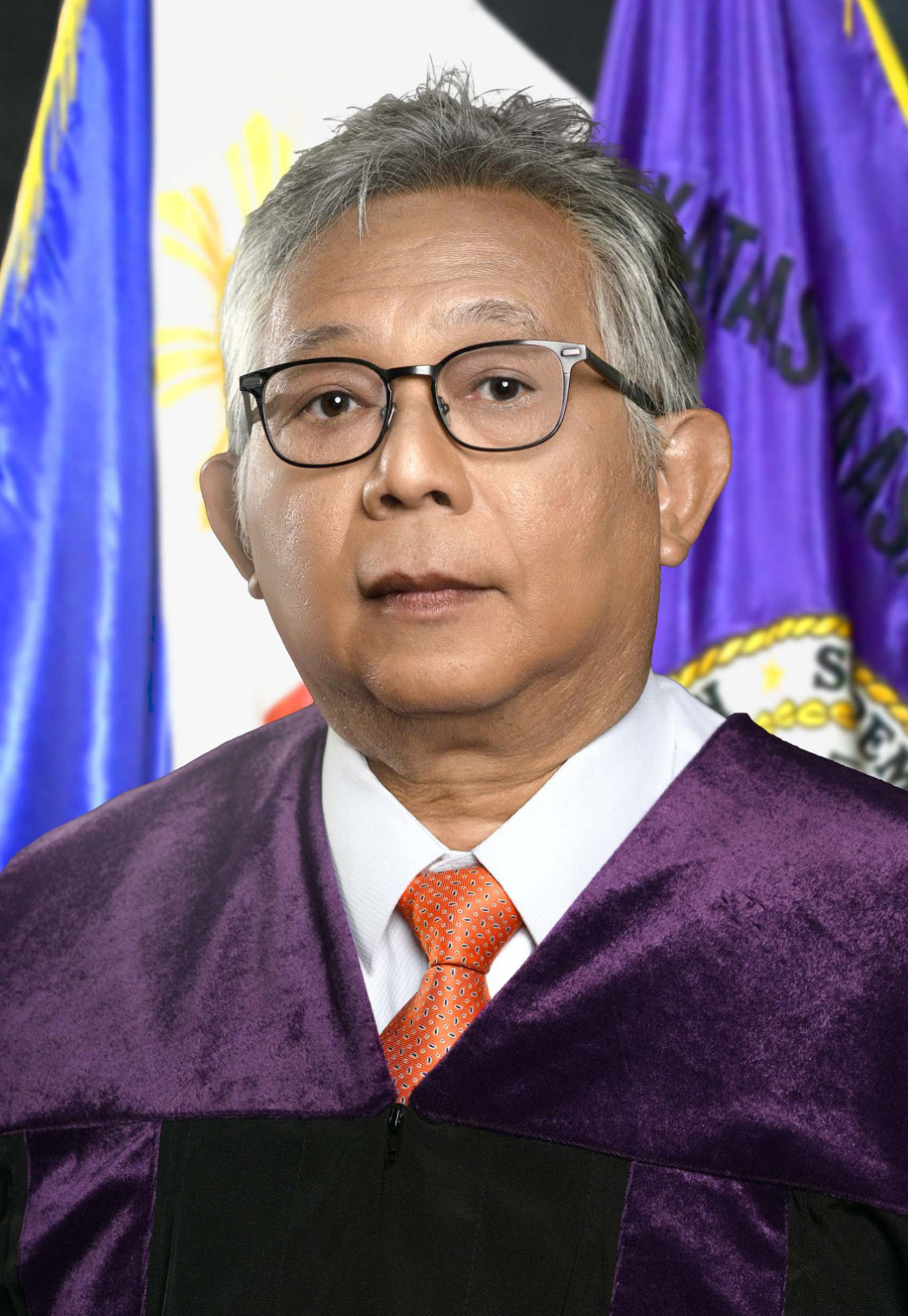
- Caguioa in 2023

Associate Justice of the Supreme Court of the Philippines
- Incumbent
- Assumed office January 22, 2016
- Appointed by: Benigno Aquino III
- Preceded by: Martin Villarama Jr.

Secretary of Justice
- Acting
- In office October 12, 2015 – January 21, 2016
- President: Benigno Aquino III
- Preceded by: Leila de Lima
- Succeeded by: Emmanuel Caparas (Acting)

5th Chief Presidential Legal Counsel
- In office January 10, 2013 – October 12, 2015
- President: Benigno Aquino III
- Preceded by: Eduardo de Mesa
- Succeeded by: Judd H. Polloso

Personal details
- Born: Alfredo Benjamin Sabater Caguioa; September 30, 1959 (age 67)
- Spouse: Pier-Angela P. Caguioa
- Education: Ateneo de Manila University (BA, LL.B)
- Profession: Lawyer, jurist

Alfredo Benjamin Sabater Caguioa GCrL (born September 30, 1959) is a Filipino lawyer who has served as an associate justice of the Supreme Court of the Philippines since 2016. Before his appointment as associate justice, he served as the acting secretary of justice from 2015 to 2016 and chief presidential legal counsel under President Benigno Aquino III from 2013 to 2015.

== Early life and education ==
Caguioa was born on September 30, 1959. He is a son of Court of Appeals Justice Eduardo P. Caguioa. Having studied at the Ateneo de Manila University for his basic education, he finished elementary in 1973 then high school in 1977. He obtained his Economics degree from the same institution in 1981, and obtained a Bachelor of Laws from Ateneo de Manila Law School in 1985 where he ranked fifth in his class. On the same year he ranked 15th on the bar exam and was admitted to the Philippine Bar the following year.

Caguioa joined SyCip Salazar Hernandez and Gatmaitan in 1986 and was a partner there from 1994 until February 2007. Together with five other lawyers from his previous firm, they founded the Caguioa and Gatmaytan and Associates in February 2007. He was a professor at the Ateneo de Manila Law School and San Sebastian College College of Law. He became a professor of civil law at the University of Santo Tomas in 2015. Caguioa was cited as a leading Philippine lawyer in dispute resolution by Chambers & Partners in its 2010 and 2011 Asia-Pacific publications.

== Cabinet service under the Aquino III administration (2013–2016) ==
On January 10, 2013, he was appointed as chief presidential legal counsel of President Benigno Aquino III, his classmate since grade school. He was part of the official delegation of the country to the Permanent Court of Arbitration for the South China Sea arbitration. After the resignation of then Secretary Leila de Lima in October 2015, he was appointed as acting secretary of the Department of Justice.

== Associate Justice of the Supreme Court ==
He was appointed as the 174th associate justice of the Supreme Court of the Philippines replacing the retired Associate Justice Martin Villarama Jr.

In July 2019, Caguioa wrote the Supreme Court's decision in People v. Narvas (G.R. No. 241254), reversing the June 2016 conviction of Armie Narvas on illegal drug charges, which cited the prosecution's failure to prove his guilt beyond a reasonable doubt before a regional trial court (RTC) in relation to a buy-bust operation within a subdivision in Santa Barbara, Pangasinan in March 2011, where no witnesses were present for Narvas' warrantless arrest. In the decision, Caguioa stated that "by thrashing basic constitutional rights as a means to curtail the proliferation of illegal drugs, instead of protecting the general welfare, oppositely, the general welfare is viciously assaulted.... A battle waged against illegal drugs that tramples on the rights of the people is not a war on drugs. It is a war against the people."

In June 2020, Caguioa penned the landmark Supreme Court En Banc decision in People v. Sapla (G.R. No. 244045), which reversed the lower and appellate court convictions of Jerry Sapla and invalidated an intrusive, warrantless search conducted by police officers who intercepted a passenger jeepney in Tabuk, Kalinga, relying solely on an unverified text message from an anonymous informant. In the ruling, Caguioa emphasized that law enforcers cannot act exclusively on the basis of tipped information, stressing that an anonymous tip is fundamentally hearsay and does not constitute the probable cause required to justify a warrantless search of a moving vehicle.

Upon Chief Justice Diosdado Peralta's early retirement in March 2021, Caguioa did not apply for the post of chief justice, with President Duterte appointing Alexander Gesmundo to the position; Duterte was noted to have bypassed more senior associate justices, including Caguioa, in spite of his stated position of respecting seniority.

In his concurring opinion issued on May 25, 2026, regarding the denial of the petition for a temporary restraining order (TRO) sought by Senator Ronald "Bato" dela Rosa, Caguioa sharply emphasized that the High Tribunal must fiercely protect its institutional integrity against political maneuvering, stating that the Court "should strongly guard against being used as a politically convenient doormat, for the wiping of those who are charged with blood on their hands."

Caguioa underwent public panel interviews by the Judicial and Bar Council (JBC) on October 22, 2026, as part of the formal selection process to succeed retiring Chief Justice Alexander G. Gesmundo, who reached his mandatory retirement age on November 6, 2026. During the hearing, Caguioa emphasized that his primary administrative and institutional goal is restoring public trust in the judiciary, pointing out that systemic distrust often drives citizens to bypass legal channels. To address trial-level bottlenecks and a massive backlog exceeding one million cases, he pitched high-performance court initiatives focused on fixing judicial apportionment and updating the rules on electronic evidence. Reaffirming his judicial philosophy, Caguioa pledged strict adherence to constitutional boundaries and the separation of powers, stating that his colleagues can expect him to remain steadfastly independent and predictable.

== Awards ==
In 2016, President Benigno Aquino III awarded Caguioa the rank of Grand Cross or Bayani of the Order of Lakandula for his outstanding service.

Legal offices
Preceded by Eduardo de Mesa	Chief Presidential Legal Counsel; 2013–2015	Succeeded by Salvador Panelo
Preceded by Martin Villarama Jr.	Associate Justice of the Supreme Court of the Philippines; 2016–present	Incumbent
Political offices
Preceded by Leila De Lima	Secretary of Justice; Acting; 2015–2016	Succeeded by Emmanuel Caparas; Acting
