= Davao Death Squad =

Filipino death squad

- Suluguon sa Katawhan
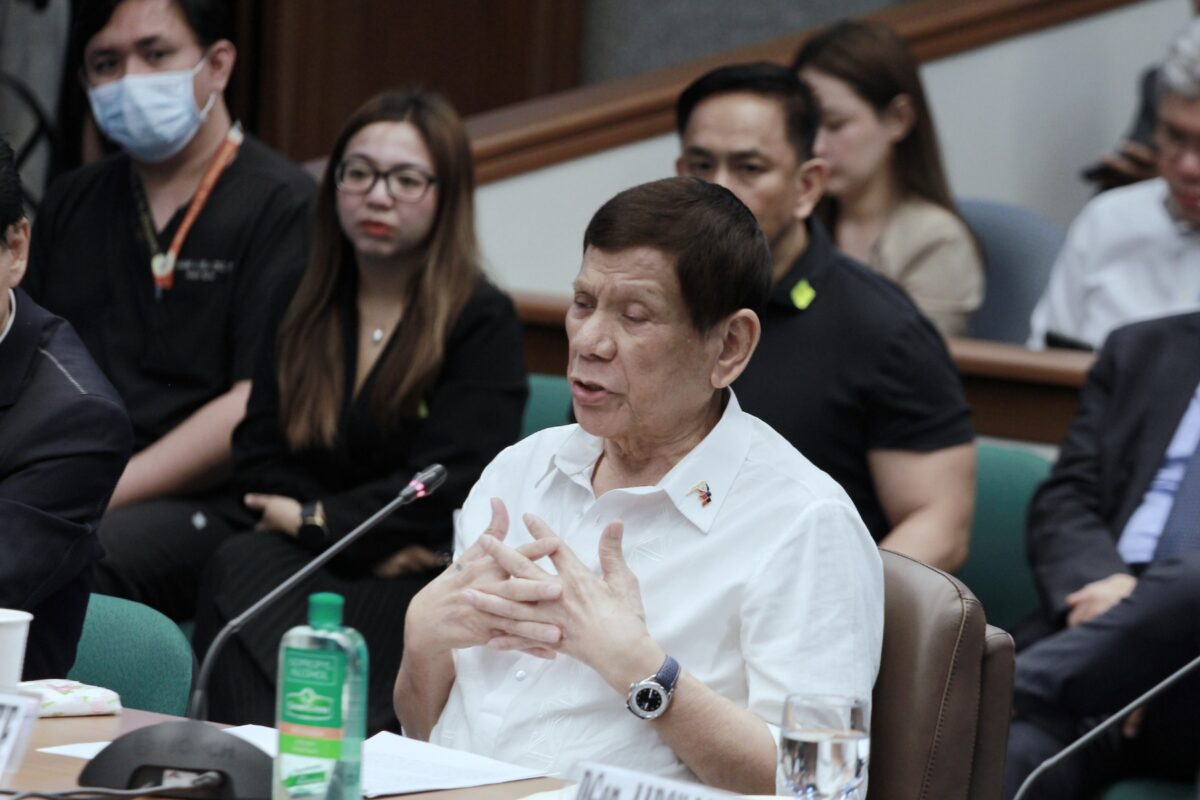
- Duterte admitting to controlling the death squad during Senate hearing on War on Drugs on October 28, 2024.
- Other name: Servants of the People
- Founder: Rodrigo Duterte (alleged)
- Leader: Rodrigo Duterte (1988 - 2025)
- Founded: 1988
- Dates active: 1988 – present
- Country: Philippines
- Allegiance: Rodrigo Duterte
- Headquarters: Davao City
- Active regions: Davao Region
- Ideology: Dutertismo; Vigilantism
- Political position: Right-wing
- Status: Active
- Size: 7 - 10 (core group) approximately 500
- Wars: Philippine drug war

The Davao Death Squad (DDS) is a death squad group in Davao City, Philippines, founded in the late 1980s by then mayor Rodrigo Duterte. The group is alleged to have conducted summary executions of street children and individuals suspected of petty crimes and drug dealing. It has been estimated that the group is responsible for the killing or disappearance of more than 1400 people by 2016. A 2009 report by the Philippine Commission on Human Rights (CHR) noted stonewalling by local police under the mayorship of Duterte while a leaked cable observed a lack of public outrage among Davao residents. Duterte has been arrested and is scheduled to face trial for the killings on 30 November 2026.

== Victims ==
According to Amnesty International and local human rights groups, death squads killed over 300 people in Davao City between 1998 and 2005. The rate of killing accelerated after this. Between 2005 and 2008, death squads were responsible for between 700 and 720 executions. In a 2009 report by Human Rights Watch, the victims were mostly alleged drug dealers, petty criminals, and street children. Amnesty International states that killings and extrajudicial executions, particularly of criminal suspects, continued throughout the year. In Mindanao many such killings, including those of minors, were attributed to the so-called "Davao Death Squad" vigilante group. It was reported that local officials in some areas advocated a "shoot to kill" policy with respect to criminal suspects resisting arrest.

Retired policeman Arthur Lascañas, a self-confessed leader of DDS, claims that the group was responsible for mosque bombings and the killing of a journalist during its heyday. According to Lascañas, the squad was ordered to bomb mosques in Davao in retaliation for the San Pedro Cathedral bombing.

== Origins ==
DDS was conceptualized by former Integrated National Police Regional Commander Dionisio Tan-Gatue Jr. to fight the New People's Army's Sparrow Unit. Tan-Gatue allegedly used the late Juan "Jun" Pala, a known anti-New People's Army propagandist and radio commentator, to report stories about the death squad, which allegedly curbed executions perpetrated by the Sparrow Unit. By mid-1997, the DDS was deemed responsible for more than 60 unsolved murders in the city. Before the media coined the term "Davao Death Squad", they operated under the name "Suluguon sa Katawhan" or "Servants of the People"

It is believed that the original members of the death squad included former members of the Sparrow Unit. Initially the death squad had around 10 members. This increased to around 500 by 2009.

== Vigilante methods ==
Members of the death squad were managed by police, according to Human Rights Watch. These officers provided the assailants with training, weapons and ammunition, motorcycles, and information on the targets. Lists of targets were drawn up by police or barangay (village or district) officials. Information might include a name, address and a photograph. Local police stations were allegedly pre-warned to facilitate the murders and the escape of the assailants. According to testimony by Edgar Matobato in a 2016 Senate hearing, he was assigned to kill certain targets that the police wanted dead such as drug pushers, rapists, and snatch thieves.

Witnesses reported that police officers took a surprisingly long time to respond to incidents, even where these occurred in the vicinity of police stations. Officers neglected to follow basic investigative procedures, such as collecting bullet casings from the street. Human Rights Watch reported that the standard tactics of the killers was to arrive in small groups of two or three on unlicensed motorbikes. Victims would be stabbed or shot without warning during daytime in public areas, such as bars, cafes, markets, shopping areas, jeepneys or tricycles, and in the presence of numerous witnesses. Assailants were generally paid between PHP5,000 and PHP50,000 (US$114 – US$1,147) for an assassination, depending on the target.

== Public opinion ==
There appears to have been a certain degree of public approval among citizens of Davao City for the actions of the death squad, primarily fueled by public discontent at "the arduous and ineffective judicial system" that created an environment where extrajudicial executions seemed to be a "practical resort" to suppress crime in the city. There were subsequent reports of death squads operating in other cities, including General Santos, Digos, and Tagum City in Mindanao as well as in Cebu City.

== Official complicity ==
In its 2009 report, Human Rights Watch criticized authorities for failing to act against the death squads. It condemned the then president, Gloria Macapagal Arroyo for tolerating the lawlessness, saying that she had, "largely turned a blind eye to the killing spree in Davao City and elsewhere." In 2004, Arroyo announced Rodrigo Duterte as her special advisor on crime, an appointment which was viewed as signifying her approval of extrajudicial killings. Human Rights Watch also highlighted the inaction of the Philippine National Police and national institutions such as the Department of Justice, the Ombudsman's Office, and the Commission on Human Rights. This official tolerance of vigilantism had created, it said, an environment of "widespread impunity".

From 2009, Philippines government institutions periodically stated their intention to investigate the death squads. On one such occasion the National Commission on Human Rights created an inter-agency task force to look into the matter. However, no real action was forthcoming. In 2008, the UN special rapporteur on extrajudicial executions, Philip Alston, pointed out that the fact that the killers made no effort to hide their identity and threatened parents with the murder of their children, suggested a belief by the killers that they were immune from police action.

In 2005, the deputy ombudsman for the Military and Other Law Enforcement Offices suspended four senior police officials for six months without pay because of their failure to solve a number of vigilante killings in their area. In an official statement the deputy ombudsman said: "The inability of the respondent police officers to prevent the summary killing in Davao City is an indication of gross neglect of duty and inefficiency and incompetence in the performance of official functions."

When the four officers were suspended, the mayor of Davao, Duterte, directed the four officials to file a petition for certiorari, on the basis that the penalty would demoralize the police, reportedly claiming, "I have pledged to help [the police] especially when they are prosecuted for simply performing their duties." The suspension order was subsequently reversed by the Court of Appeals after the police officers filed a petition.

In 2012, the Office of the Ombudsman charged 21 police officers with simple neglect of duty over the vigilante killings. The charge provided for penalties of 1-month suspension or a fine of 1 month's salary. Investigators from the Ombudsman's office found that there was an "unusually high number of unsolved killings" from 2005 to 2008 in the areas of jurisdiction of the officers' precincts. The officers ranged in seniority from police chief inspector to police senior superintendent.

=== "Davao Death Squad" 1998–2015 report ===
In 2017, hermit "biking" priest Amado "Picx" Picardal, CSsR, published the "Davao Death Squad" 1998-2015 report, reportedly sent to the International Criminal Court. As the Coalition Against Summary Execution spokesperson, he also assisted the Commission on Human Rights and the Human Rights Watch regarding the extrajudicial killings and forced disappearances in the Philippines investigation. He served as the Episcopal Commission of Basic Ecclesial Communities' former executive secretary.

On May 29, 2024, Fr. Edilberto Cepe, provincial superior, announced the passing of Picardal, 69, of cardiac arrest in Cebu City Busay Retreat House alongside Bruno, his dog, on the 47th year of his sacerdotal ministry.

=== Involvement of Rodrigo Duterte ===
Former Davao City mayor and former president of the Philippines Rodrigo Duterte has been heavily criticized by numerous organizations for condoning and even inciting executions to take place during his leadership.

The Mayor of Davao City has done nothing to prevent these killings, and his public comments suggest that he is, in fact, supportive.

— April 2009 UN General Assembly of the Human Rights Council, the UN report (Eleventh Session Agenda item 3, par 21),

In 2001–2002, Human Rights Watch reported that Duterte appeared on local television and radio and announced the names of "criminals", some of whom were later executed. In July 2005, at a crime summit in the Manila Hotel, Duterte said, "Summary execution of criminals remains the most effective way to crush kidnapping and illegal drugs".

In 2008, commenting on Duterte, the UN special rapporteur on extrajudicial, summary or arbitrary executions said, "The mayor's positioning is frankly untenable: He dominates the city so thoroughly as to stamp out whole genres of crime, yet he remains powerless in the face of hundreds of murders committed by men without masks in view of witnesses."

In 2009, Duterte said: "If you are doing an illegal activity in my city, if you are a criminal or part of a syndicate that preys on the innocent people of the city, for as long as I am the mayor, you are a legitimate target of assassination."

In 2009, Duterte responded to a reported arrest and subsequent release of a notorious drug lord in Manila.

In 2014, referring to the arrest of a suspected rice smuggler, Duterte spoke out at a Senate hearing, saying: "If this guy would go to Davao and starts to unload (smuggled rice)… I will gladly kill him." For these comments Duterte was attacked in an editorial in The Manila Times, which condemned "the mentality of lawlessness and vigilantism." The newspaper argued that this culture of impunity enabled those in power, including officials, "private warlords and businessmen vigilantes" to take retribution against those they felt had acted against their interests: "They kill journalists exposing corruption and human rights activists exposing abusive police and military men."

In 2014, following Duterte's comments in relation to killing a person suspected of smuggling rice, the office of the President of the Philippines then under Benigno Aquino III issued a statement saying, "Killing a person is against the law. The President has been firm in the belief that no one is above the law. We must not resort to extralegal methods."

In 2015, despite his earlier statements of support for the extrajudicial killing of criminals, Duterte has constantly denied any involvement in the death squad.

In a January 2016 decision by the Office of the Ombudsman on the investigation conducted by the Commission on Human Rights on the alleged death squad in Davao between 2005 and 2009, the Ombudsman found no evidence to support "the killings attributed or attributable to the Davao Death Squad, much less the involvement of Mayor Rodrigo Duterte" to such acts. Ombudsman Conchita Carpio-Morales said she recused herself from these investigations because of affinity with Duterte. Morales is the sister of attorney Lucas Carpio Jr., husband of Court of Appeals Justice Agnes Reyes Carpio. Agnes and Lucas are the parents of Sara Duterte's husband, Mans Carpio. Sara Duterte is President Duterte's daughter and now-mayor of Davao City.

When Duterte was elected president, he appointed Vitaliano Aguirre II, a former classmate, as his secretary of the Department of Justice. Aguirre had been the former mayor's lawyer against cases linking Duterte to the death squads, and the lawyer representing a policeman who owned a quarry site turned into a firing range, where remains of supposed victims of these alleged death squads were believed to have been buried. Aguirre helped argue against the CHR's investigation of the quarry site, and had an earlier search warrant quashed.

In September 2016, during the Senate hearing on extrajudicial killings, Edgar Matobato, a former member of the "Lambada Boys", later renamed the DDS, testified that then-Davao City Mayor Duterte ordered the group to bomb a mosque and to kill the Muslim brethren therein in 1993, an event that another report on this so-called bombing placed as having been perpetrated by alleged "Christian militants" eight hours after Matobato's testified-to time of the incident, with no casualties reported. Because of other inconsistencies in Matobato's allegations, Senator Panfilo Lacson invoked the legal principle of falsus in uno, falsus in omnibus (false in one, false in everything).

On December 14, 2016, Senator Leila de Lima reminded the public that the president's admission to committing murder is grounds for impeachment under the Philippine's current constitution. De Lima said this in response to Duterte publicly commenting that he had killed drug suspects when he was Mayor of Davao. In March 2017, De Lima was arrested due to allegations that she was accepting bribes from prisoners while she was Justice Secretary. Many international organizations and Filipino citizens voiced their concern regarding the arrest of Senator De Lima. Since she is an outspoken critic of Duterte and his war on drugs, many believe that is why she was arrested. Duterte's administration claimed that the reason for De Lima's arrest was due to the alleged bribes she received from imprisoned drug lords in order to allow them to continue to operate behind bars, and not her opinion on Duterte. During that time it was revealed that the killings under Duterte as mayor of Davao City from 300 from the late 1990's-2005 to 700 deaths in a three year period from 2005-2008 timeframe.

As of January 2020, the International Criminal Court confirmed that an investigation into Duterte's involvement with the death squads was ongoing, despite the Philippines having withdrawn from the ICC in 2018, because it continued to have jurisdiction over crimes committed when the country was still a member. Duterte withdrew the Philippines one month after the opening of the investigation.

In 2024, alleged hitman Edgar Matobato left the country with his wife and two stepchildren via identity fraud and fake passport, posing as a gardener. Duterte admitted to maintaining and directing the squad in Senate hearing in October 2024.

As of 2025, the former President Rodrigo Duterte has been arrested and transferred to the Netherlands to face trial for alleged crimes against humanity. The Prosecutor of the International Criminal Court released a statement affirming that the Duterte administration's alleged role in the Davao Death squad will be factored into their argument. Subsequently, rallies in The Hague, Malaysia, and Melbourne to have the charges dropped on humanitarian grounds were attended and organized by Sara Duterte, who is both the current Vice President of the Philippines and his daughter.

As of 2026 the International Criminal Court investigating the ties between the Dutertes and the Davao Death Squad.

== Portrayal on film ==
A film depicting vigilante killings in the Philippines Engkwentro ("Square Off"), premiered in July 2009 at the Cinemalaya Independent Film Festival, where it received strong reactions. The film was later selected for the 66th Venice International Film Festival where it won the Best Picture award in the Orizzonti (New Horizons) program. The film's director, Pepe Diokno, won the Luigi de Laurentiis Venice Award for a Debut Film, also known as the "Lion of the Future" prize.

== Other uses of the term ==
The initialism DDS has been adopted by hardline civilian supporters of former President Rodrigo Duterte and Vice President Sara Duterte in order to stand for '"Diehard Duterte Supporters". According to political science Professor and Manila Times columnist Antonio Contreras of De La Salle University, the term was adopted by Duterte supporters during the President's campaign in 2016 and used "as a rallying point to consolidate the Duterte political base."

== See also ==
- Extrajudicial killings and forced disappearances in the Philippines
- Social cleansing
