= Vitaliano Aguirre II =

Filipino lawyer and government official

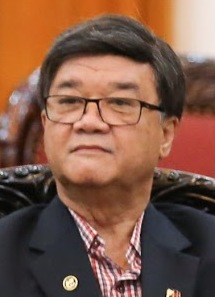

Vice-Chairman of the National Police Commission
- In office January 11, 2021 – June 30, 2022
- President: Rodrigo Duterte
- Preceded by: Rogelio T. Casurao
- Succeeded by: Atty. Alberto A. Bernardo

Secretary of Justice
- In office July 1, 2016 – April 5, 2018
- President: Rodrigo Duterte
- Preceded by: Emmanuel Caparas
- Succeeded by: Menardo Guevarra

Vice President for Legal Affairs of Clark Development Corporation
- In office March 16, 2013 – June 30, 2016
- President: Benigno Aquino III
- Preceded by: Perlita M. Sagmit

Personal details
- Born: Vitaliano Napeñas Aguirre II; October 16, 1946 (age 79) Mulanay, Quezon, Philippines
- Party: PDP (2016–present)
- Other political affiliations: Liberal (1987–2016)
- Education: San Beda College
- Profession: Lawyer

Vitaliano "Vit" Napeñas Aguirre II (Tagalog: [vitɐlˈjano naˈpɛɲas ʔaˈɡirɛ]; born October 16, 1946) is a Filipino lawyer who served as a commissioner of the National Police Commission from January 11, 2021, to June 30, 2022. He previously served as Secretary of Justice under the Duterte administration from 2016 until his resignation in 2018, and vice president and chief legal counsel of Clark Development Corporation under former President Benigno Aquino III. He gained wide public attention in 2012 during the impeachment trial of Supreme Court Chief Justice Renato Corona when he was cited for contempt after he was caught covering his ears while being lectured by the late Senator Miriam Defensor Santiago.

Aguirre is currently being investigated by the International Criminal Court (ICC) in The Hague for crimes against humanity due to his involvement in the drug war during the administration of Rodrigo Duterte, who has been arrested in March 2025. The ICC is expected to release more arrest warrants against people involved in the case.

== Early life and education ==
Vitaliano Aguirre II was born and raised in Mulanay, Quezon to Alfaro G. Aguirre and Maria Napeñas. His father was a mayor of the town who also served as Liberal Party chairman for almost 40 years. The eldest of nine children, he attended the Mulanay Elementary School and graduated as valedictorian in 1959. His family then moved to Manila where he received his high school and college education. He was a full scholar at San Beda College, graduating magna cum laude with a Bachelor of Arts in 1967. He then pursued legal studies at San Beda College of Law, where he and Rodrigo Duterte would become classmates and fraternity brothers in Lex Talionis Fraternitas. He graduated from law school as valedictorian and cum laude in 1971, and passed the bar examination the same year. As a young lawyer, he joined young activists who fought the Ferdinand Marcos dictatorship. He went into hiding for five years after the Marcos dictatorship charged him for inciting to sedition until the case against him was dropped. In later years, he would support the Marcos family in politics due to his ties with Rodrigo Duterte.

== Career ==
He established a law firm in Makati with partners Rodolfo Robles, Sixto Brillantes, Jose Ricafrente, Antonio Nachura and Antonio San Vicente. He served as the lead counsel of Hubert Webb in the 1995 Vizconde murders case and as deputy counsel of the Feliciano Commission's fact-finding investigation of the 2003 Oakwood mutiny. He is a managing partner at Aguirre & Aguirre Law Office, and taught law at the Arellano University Law Foundation. Aguirre supported the 2010 presidential campaign of President Benigno Aquino III.

During the impeachment trial of Renato Corona, he was tapped as one of several private prosecutors tasked to secure the Chief Justice's conviction. In February 2012, during the impeachment of Renato Corona where he was a counsel, Aguirre was cited for contempt after a disrespectful gesture and argument with senator-judge Miriam Defensor Santiago, who was the most vocal on the court trial proceedings. In March 2013, President Aquino appointed Aguirre as vice president for legal affairs of the government-owned Clark Development Corporation.

Aguirre was also a lawyer for then Davao Mayor Rodrigo Duterte. He served as the latter's chief legal counsel on the cases seeking to disqualify Duterte during the 2016 presidential campaign, as well as on cases linking the President Duterte to the Davao death squads. He likewise represented a policeman who owned a quarry site turned into a firing range where remains of supposed victims of these alleged death squads were believed to have been buried.

In July 2016, following the victory of Duterte for the Philippine presidency, Aguirre was appointed as the new secretary of the Department of Justice. On July 26, 2016, Mulanay plantation farmers accused Aguirre that he was asking and "threatening" them to pay rent in a land they rightfully own. The resident farmers who have been living and farming for generations in the 200-hectare Hacienda Tulungan in Brgy. Sta. Rosa claimed that the land belongs to them under the government's Comprehensive Agrarian Reform Program (CARP).

On November 27, 2016, two commissioners of the Bureau of Immigration, an attached agency to Aguirre's department, were embroiled in an extortion controversy. Commissioners Al Argosino and Michael Robles were accused of extorting P50 million from gaming tycoon Jack Lam in exchange of release of 1,316 Chinese employees of Fontana Leisure Parks and Casino. Aguirre denied knowledge of the alleged exchange between the immigration commissioners and the tycoon, even after he personally met Jack Lam.

Aguirre sparked controversy after he pushed for state prosecutors, which he controlled, to file cases against incumbent senator Leila de Lima, which led to de Lima's arrest on February 24, 2017. Afterwards, in a two-page motion, prosecutors from the Department of Justice (DOJ), which Aguirre headed, asked the Muntinlupa Regional Trial Court (MCRTC) Branch 204 to consolidate and handle the three cases against the senator de Lima. Judge Juanita Guerrero, presiding judge of Branch 204, was the same judge who ordered de Lima's arrest.

On June 8, 2017, Aguirre downgraded from murder to homicide the charges filed against CIDG members involved in the killing of Albuera, Leyte mayor Rolando Espinosa in 2016, sparking public outrage. CIDG Region 8 police chief Supt. Marvin Marcos, along with 18 others, were the main suspects of the killings.

During the 2017 Marawi Crisis, Aguirre tagged various opposition senators, including Bam Aquino and Antonio Trillanes, along with others as masterminds of the siege, an accusation that would later be proved as fabrications. Aguirre claimed that the senators flew to Marawi and met with members of two influential local political clans a few days before the May 23 siege. Aguirre showed to the media a photo of the supposed meeting. However, Aguirre was apparently unaware that the photo of the alleged meeting in Marawi was posted on a Facebook fan page created by the President's supporters on May 13, or more than a week before terrorists mounted the attack. Aguirre drew flak from the public especially those he named due to his false claims and the fact that he picked an image that was first shared and posted on several pro-Duterte blogs and known sources of fake news, including dugongmaharlika.com and allthingspinoy.com. After the incident, Aguirre was labelled as the King of Fake News by citizens and other lawmakers. Aguirre was criticized for saying that he "willingly" amplified fake news "like a troll" against political opponents.

In September 2017, senator Risa Hontiveros caught justice secretary Aguirre drafting fabricated charges against her through text messages during a hearing on the deaths of minors caused by the Philippine drug war, notably the brutal murder of Kian delos Santos. Aguirre's text messages instructed former Negros Oriental representative Jacinto Paras, a member of controversial group VACC, to 'expedite' cases against Hontiveros, a sitting senator who was seeking justice for the minors killed. The same tactic was used by Aguirre against senator Leila de Lima, which led to de Lima's arrest a few months past. Despite being caught and the evidence presented in the Senate, Aguirre still filed cases against Hontiveros in October.

On November 22, 2017, Aguirre cleared former commissioner Nicanor Faeldon, a government ally, and other former officials of the Bureau of Customs in the charges (drug and criminal) filed against them by the country's drug agency over the smuggling of a whopping P6.4-billion shabu shipment in May 2027, erupting into a controversy.

On March 13, 2018, Aguirre cleared various drug offenders, including Cebu-based businessman Peter Lim, kumpare and campaign supporter of President Duterte. Lim was tagged by Kerwin Espinosa, a self-confessed drug offender who was also cleared by Aguirre on the same day. Other offenders who were cleared included Peter Co, Max Miro, Ruel Malindangan, Jun Pepito and Lovely Adam Impal as well as 12 other unnamed persons.

On March 16, 2018, Aguirre placed Janet Lim-Napoles, the alleged brains behind the pork barrel scam, under provisional government protection, re-opening the Priority Development Assistance Fund scam under former president Benigno Aquino III. The complaint to re-open the case was filed by staunch Duterte supporter and ally Greco Belgica.

On March 27, 2018, Aguirre tagged Cebu mayor Tomas Osmeña, who had a conflict with president Duterte, as a drug lord protector. However, the Philippine National Police has disapproved the tagging as no concrete evidence was found.

After continuous protests for his resignation, Aguirre resigned from his post on April 5, 2018. His resignation was accepted by president Rodrigo Duterte. Majority of politicians, including Grace Poe and Sonny Angara, have pointed out that his resignation should not shield him from the injustices he may have committed when he was justice secretary. Aguirre later retaliated, stating that he left the Department of Justice with a 'better image', to which majority of politicians and fact-checking organizations do not agree with. On the same day, the people of Mulanay, Aguirre's hometown, slammed him for "bringing shame" to the town. On April 6, 2018, the president appointed Menardo Guevarra as the new justice secretary.

Speculations of Aguirre gunning for a Senate seat was widespread since House Speaker Alvarez stated that he was asking President Duterte to include Aguirre in his party's senatorial slate, however, Aguirre did not file his candidacy for the 2019 elections after being ranked at the bottom of a senatorial survey.

On January 11, 2021, Duterte appointed Aguirre as a commissioner of the National Police Commission, representing the private sector.

In May 2022, Rafael Ragos, former Bureau of Corrections director general and a witness in de Lima's drug case recanted his testimony. Ragos previously testified that de Lima accepted ₱5 million from him via drug lord Peter Co, while she was Secretary of Justice, and that it was later used to fund her senatorial campaign in 2016. Ragos alleged that Justice Secretary Vitaliano Aguirre II coerced him to lie to implicate de Lima.

On February 13, 2026, the International Criminal Court included Aguirre among eight indirect co-perpetrators in the crimes against humanity case against president Duterte during the Philippine drug war.

== Controversies ==
Aguirre, during his lead as Secretary of Justice has faced many controversies, some of which are:

- He was instrumental for the arrest and prosecution of opposition senator Leila de Lima due to her allegedly coddling of drug activities inside New Bilibid Prison as former DOJ secretary.
- He allegedly requested to expedite cases against senator Risa Hontiveros.
- The alleged false tagging of senators Bam Aquino and Antonio Trillanes to the Marawi siege which he eventually denied.
- Aguirre allegedly threatened Mulanay plantation farmers to pay him "rent" for the land that the farmers claimed as theirs under the Comprehensive Agrarian Reform Program (CARP). Aguirre alleged that the farmers were staying on the plantation beyond the timeframe prescribed by the CARP.
- The amendment of the cases of the policemen allegedly involved in the Espinosa slay from murder to homicide.
- Clearance of BOC Commissioner Nicanor Faeldon in the P6.4-billion shabu shipment case which was under his watch.
- DOJ prosecutors dropped the charges on Peter Lim and self-confessed drug lord Kerwin Espinosa due to alleged weak evidence by "inconsistencies of the lone witness" former Drug "distributor" Marcelo Adorco. CIDG then overturned this and filed a case against Peter Lim. Makati court ordered for his arrest and prosecution and the government offered a P500,000 bounty for his capture.
- The re-investigation of the PDAF case of 2013 in which he intended to put alleged pork barrel mastermind Janet Lim-Napoles as a state witness.
- He was slammed by Mayor Ojeda of his hometown of Mulanay and accused him of "bringing shame to the town". Ojedas are political rival of Aguirres in the said town.
- Aguirre is being "investigated" by the Hague-based International Criminal Court, which launched a "preliminary examination" into allegations of "crimes against humanity" allegedly committed by President Rodrigo Duterte in the midst of Philippine war on drugs.
- On October 29, 2018, Leila De Lima filed with Ombudsman Samuel Martires complaints against Aguirre II and Menardo Guevarra for violation of section 10(f) of RA 6981, the "Witness Protection, Security and Benefit Act." The Ombudsman, however, in 2019 and 2020, dismissed the complaints which were reversed - "This case is remanded to the Office of the Ombudsman for appropriate action", Justice Raymond Reynold Lauigan, CA Special 17th Division ruled in a decision dated November 21, 2023. Accordingly, De Lima pleaded for the investigation of her cases.

Political offices
Preceded by Emmanuel Caparas; Acting	Secretary of Justice; 2016–2018	Succeeded by Menardo Guevarra
