= Timeline of the Philippine drug war =

The following is the timeline of important major events that occurred during the Philippine drug war, which began in 2016 under the regime of Rodrigo R. Duterte, and persisted under the administration of Bongbong Marcos. Throughout the years since it started, the drug war had seen numerous violent incidents involving Filipino law-enforcement agencies and various criminal groups. It had also claimed the lives of several politicians, high-ranking public servants, and innocent people – including children – through murders, assassinations, and acts of vigilantism.

== Rodrigo R. Duterte's administration ==
=== 2016 ===
- June 30 – Rodrigo R. Duterte was inaugurated as the 16th president of the Philippines. In his speeches, he urged civilians to fight and kill potential drug suspects. Days later, the Philippine National Police (PNP) announced they had killed 30 alleged drug dealers since Duterte was sworn in as president on June 30.
- July 18 – Jefferson Bunuan, a 20-year-old Criminology student, was killed by the police in Sta Ana, Manila. The latter claimed that the student opened fire first, but this was denied by his family.
- August 2 – Albuera mayor Rolando Espinosa and his son Kerin Espinosa, both linked to drug trafficking, surrendered. The PNP then had a shootout a day later with twelve armed men, who were alleged to have links to Espinosa, in Barangay Benolho in Albuera. Six of the men were killed, and 237 grams (8.4 oz) of shabu (methamphetamine) worth ₱1.9 million, along with some firearms, were seized.
- August 11 – Edgar Allen Alvarez, alleged drug lord from Laguna, was shot and killed by the police in the Leyte Regional Prison after he allegedly threw a grenade at the police as they were about to search his bunk house. His body was said to have been found with two handguns and leaves suspected to be marijuana.
- August 13 – Three Chinese drug lords incarcerated at the Davao Prison and Penal Farm were stabbed and killed by Filipino inmates; a crime allegedly sanctioned by the police.
- August 25 – Duterte released a drug matrix showing the structure of drug trafficking operations at the New Bilibid Prison and identified the two former top officials of the Department of Justice, the former provincial governor and board member of Pangasinan, and the former Bureau of Corrections director as being involved in the Bilibid narcotics trade.
- August 26 – Alleged drug lord Melvin Odicta was killed together with his wife after being shot by unknown suspects while disembarking from a passenger ship in Caticlan, Aklan.
- September 1 – A 4-year-old girl named Althea Barbon sustained gunshot wounds and died during a buy-bust operation in Guhuilngan City, Negros Oriental against her father, Aldrick Barbon. The two were riding a motorcycle at that time when the police surprised them. Aldrick allegedly tried to speed away, forcing the police to open fire. Unbeknownst to them, Althea was also on the aforementioned motorcycle.
- September 15 – Edgar Matobato, an alleged member of the Davao Death Squad, surrendered and confessed about the group's activities and Duterte's participation.
- September 19 – Leila de Lima, Duterte's most staunch rival, was ousted from her position heading the Senate committee.
- September 28 – A riot erupted inside Building 14 at New Bilibid Prison. Initial reports from acting Bureau of Corrections director Rolando Asuncion said that one inmate witnessed three other convicts, namely Peter Co, Tony Co and Vicente Sy, using methamphetamine moments before the riot started. Tony Co was stabbed and killed.
- October 18 – Jesus Tulin, alleged hitman of the Espinosas, was killed in a rest house together with his wife in Barangay Talisayan, Albuera, Leyte.
- October 28 – Datu Saudi Ampatuan Mayor Samsudin Dimaukom and nine others, including his five bodyguards, were killed during an anti-illegal drug operation in Makilala, North Cotabato. According to police, the group were heavily armed and opened fire on police, who found sachets of methamphetamine at the scene. No police was injured in the incident. Dimaukom was among the drug list named by Duterte on August 7; he had immediately surrendered, and then returned to Datu Saudi Ampatuan.
- October 29 – Drug suspect Fernando Balagbis was killed while detained in Baybay City Jail.
- November 5 – Rolando Espinosa, who had been detained at Baybay City Sub-Provincial Jail for violation of the Comprehensive Dangerous Drugs Act of 2002, was killed in what was described as a shootout inside his jail cell with personnel from the Criminal Investigation and Detection Group (CIDG).
- November 19 – Joshua Cumilang, 18-year-old student from Tondo, was searched, apprehended, and dragged by policemen led by patrolman Ronald Alvarez, to an alley before being executed. The police claimed self-defense.
- December 3 – San Niño Batucan, a 7-year-old boy, was shot and killed inside his house in Consolacion, Cebu during a gunfight involving an alleged drug-related individual.
- December 11 – Francis Mañosca, a 5-year-old boy, was killed by unknown gunmen inside his home in Pasay City together with his father, Domingo Mañosca, who was a drug surrenderee.
- December 22 – Kristine Joy Sailog, a 12-year-old girl, was caught in a crossfire in Laguna while attending a mass, during an vigilante-style assassination attempt on drug personality Allan Hernandez.

=== 2017 ===
- January 4 – Sputnik gang member by the name of Randy Lizardo shot and killed policeman PO1 Enrico Domingo in Tondo. Domingo, together with other PNP officers, were conducting a buy-bust operation inside Lizardo's home.
- January 8 – Hideyoshi Kawata, a 17-year-old student in Caloocan, was caught in a police anti-drug operation. Police claimed that Kawata was armed with an Uzi submachine gun during the operation, which the family denied.
- February 23 – Muntinlupa Regional Trial Court issued an arrest warrant against Leila de Lima for allegedly violating the drug trafficking law.
- March 11 – Duterte issued an executive order creating the Inter-agency Committee on Anti-illegal Drugs (ICAD), composed of 21 government entities, headed by the Philippine Drug Enforcement Agency (PDEA), tasked to lead the fight against illegal drugs.
- April 27 – A raid by the Commission of Human Rights on the Manila Police District revealed twelve men and women detained inside a hidden cell. They were to be released after a payment of a ransom.
- July 30 – Reynaldo Parojinog, the mayor of Ozamiz City, was killed along with 14 others, including his wife Susan, in a dawn raid at around 2:30 am on his home in San Roque Lawis.
- August 17 – Kian Loyd Dogillo delos Santos, a 17-year-old student, was loitering around his house in Caloocan, Metro Manila one night, when two plainclothes policemen grabbed and dragged him to a secluded area, where he was shot. The PNP claimed that he was a "drug runner" but evidence suggested that he was not on any drug watch list. Officers responsible for his death were later arrested and charged.
- August 17 – 25 alleged criminals were killed in separate police shootouts and drug busts in Manila, including members of the notorious Bahala Na Gang.
- August 18 – Two teenagers, 19-year-old Carl Arnaiz and 14-year-old Reynaldo "Kulot" De Guzman, went missing in Caloocan. Their bodies were later found several days later, and the PNP reported that both were killed after they allegedly fired weapons at the police. The PNP also claimed both were in possession of illegal substances. Police officers responsible for their deaths, including one PO1 Jeffrey Perez, were charged and sentenced for murder.
- August 23 – 5-year-old student named Danica May Garcia was killed by a stray bullet coming from unidentified gunmen in Dagupan during an anti-drug operation.
- August 24 – Narco-lawyer Rogelio Bato Jr., the attorney of Rolando Espinosa, was killed by unknown assailants in Tacloban together with high school student Angelica Pabonita.
- September 1 – Alleged drug lord Richard Prevendido was killed together with his son in a police operation in Iloilo City. Before his death, he was considered the "Top 1 Drug Lord" in Western Visayas by the Acting Director of the Iloilo Provincial Police, Police Senior Supt. Marlon Tayaba.
- October 12 – Duterte announced the transfer of anti-drug operations to the Philippine Drug Enforcement Agency, ending the involvement of the PNP.

=== 2018 ===
- January 18 – Human Rights Watch released World Report 2018, criticizing the Philippine drug war and alleging that thousands of people had been killed since the campaign began in 2016.
- February 8 – The Prosecutor of the International Criminal Court (ICC) announced the opening of a preliminary examination into alleged crimes committed in connection with the Philippine drug war.
- March 14 – The Philippine government formally notified the United Nations of its withdrawal from the Rome Statute, the treaty that established the International Criminal Court.
- June 18 – A minor, 4-year-old Bladen Skyler Abatayo, was killed by a stray bullet in Cebu during an 'anti-drug operation'.
- July 2 – Tanauan, Batangas Mayor Antonio Halili, known for his anti-drug campaign, was assassinated by a sniper during a flag-raising ceremony.
- July 3 – General Tinio, Nueva Ecija Mayor Ferdinand Bote was ambushed and killed by unidentified gunmen.
- September 5 – Mariano Blanco III, the Mayor of Ronda, Cebu, was gunned down unidentified gunmen inside his municipal hall office. He had been linked to illegal drugs by the Duterte administration, and he had reportedly been stripped of police control prior to his murder.
- October 10 – Six members of a Waray-Waray gang were killed in a buy-bust operation in Barangay San Isidro, Rodriguez, Rizal.
- October 30 – President Rodrigo Duterte signed Executive Order No. 66, institutionalizing the Philippine Anti-Illegal Drugs Strategy (PADS) and establishing a whole-of-government approach to the anti-drug campaign.
- November 29 – The Caloocan Regional Trial Court convicted three police officers for the murder of Kian delos Santos, marking the first conviction of police personnel in a drug-war-related killing.

=== 2019 ===
- March 17 – The Philippines' withdrawal from the Rome Statute officially took effect, ending its membership in the International Criminal Court.
- April 1 – The Philippine Drug Enforcement Agency reported continued implementation of the anti-drug campaign and expansion of rehabilitation programs.
- June 3 – Jason Cada, small-time drug pusher, was ambushed and shot dead in Tacloban, Leyte.
- July 27 – Three police officers convicted in the murder of Kian delos Santos appealed their convictions before the Court of Appeals.
- September 16 – The United Nations Human Rights Council adopted a resolution requesting a comprehensive report on the human rights situation in the Philippines.
- October 7 – Vice President Leni Robredo accepted President Duterte's offer to serve as co-chairperson of the Inter-Agency Committee on Anti-Illegal Drugs (ICAD).
- October 25 – Mayor David Navarro of Clarin, Misamis Occidental was assassinated by masked gunmen while in police custody in Cebu. Duterte had named Navarro among the 44 public officials linked to drugs.
- November 24 – President Duterte removed Vice President Robredo from her position as ICAD co-chairperson after less than three weeks.

=== 2020 ===
- June 4 – The Office of the United Nations High Commissioner for Human Rights released a report stating that thousands of killings linked to the drug war had occurred amid what it described as widespread impunity. The report cited at least 8,663 deaths based on official government data and called for greater accountability.
- June 25 – Retired police officer SPO3 Francisco Homeres Jr., a personnel associated with illegal narcotics, was killed in an ambush by unidentified gunmen in Tacloban, Leyte.
- June 26 – A police anti-drug operation in Barangay Minuyan, City of San Jose del Monte, Bulacan resulted in the seizure of illegal drugs and the deaths of several suspects during an armed encounter with law enforcement officers.
- July 7 – Rolando Loyola, a leader of the Sigue-Sigue Sputnik, was arrested during Operation Pagtugis led by Regional Intelligence Division, NCRPO in Sampaloc, Manila.
- July 30 – Wesley Barayuga, the Philippine Charity Sweepstakes Office board secretary, was gunned down by unknown assailants while cruising in Mandaluyong, Metro Manila. He was included without evidence in Duterte's narcolist. NAPOLCOM commissioner Edilberto Leonardo, and police colonel Royina Garma we're suspected of the hit.
- August 7 – Former drug user Jason Golong was shot and killed by unidentified assailants in Tacloban. According to later accounts, the attackers used high-caliber 5.56 mm firearms.
- August 25 – Retired police officer Pio Peñaflor and his son, Alphy Peñaflor, were shot dead by unidentified gunmen near the Palo Metropolitan Cathedral in Palo, Leyte. The former was a drug user who had just finished rehabilitation at Department of Health - Treatment and Rehabilitation Center.
- September 13 – Retired police officers Dennis Monteza and Constantino Torre, together with former jail guard Ian Pat Cabredo and his live-in partner Maritess Pami, were ambushed and killed in Palo, Leyte.
- November 24 – Police Captain Ariel Ilagan of the Southern Police District was ambushed and killed while driving at Imus, Cavite. Ilagan previously headed the Taguig City Police's Drug Enforcement Unit and had recently been transferred to the Discipline Law and Order Section (DLOS), which handles “administrative and less grave cases” of policemen.
- December 3 – Mayor of Los Baños, Laguna, Caesar Perez, was assassinated at the Los Baños Municipal Hall. Perez was one of several politicians who was included in Duterte's list of "narco-politicians".

=== 2021 ===
- January 26 – The PNP reported that anti-drug operations conducted during 2020 resulted in thousands of arrests and the seizure of billions of pesos worth of illegal drugs, while hundreds of suspects were killed in police operations.
- February 10 – Infamous drug trafficker Jayson Sampiano Deniega, who was the fifth most wanted person in Lanao del Sur, was killed in a shootout together with two cohorts against a joint task force consisting of the Balabagan Municipal Police Station and the Marine Battalion Landing Team 5.
- March 29 – Police and Philippine Drug Enforcement Agency personnel had a shootout near a shopping mall along Commonwealth Avenue in Quezon City after a miscoordination during an anti-drug operation. Two police officers, two PDEA agents, and one informant were killed.
- June 17 – Former Mayor Montasser Sabal of Talitay of Maguindanao was shot by his own police escort while being transported to Camp Crame, following his arrest for drug-related charges. PNP stated that he tried to grab one of their guns.
- June 23 – The Department of Justice released the results of its review of selected anti-drug operations, acknowledging irregularities in several cases involving deaths during police operations.
- September 15 – The Pre-Trial Chamber of the International Criminal Court authorized a formal investigation into alleged crimes against humanity committed in connection with the Philippine drug war from 2011 to 2019.
- November 10 – The Department of Justice disclosed that dozens of anti-drug operations resulting in deaths were under further review as part of the government's examination of drug-war cases.
- December 31 – Government data indicated that official anti-drug operations since July 2016 had resulted in more than 6,200 deaths and over 300,000 arrests by the end of 2021.

== Bongbong Marcos' administration ==
=== 2022 ===
- March 15 – The National Bureau of Investigations (NBI) intercepted three vans containing ₱11 billion worth of illegal drugs in Infanta, Quezon. The event became known as the March 2022 Infanta drug seizure, and is considered as the largest drug haul in Philippine history, in terms of monetary value.
- May 9 – The Philippines conducted national and local elections that resulted in the victory of presidential candidate Bongbong Marcos, who pledged to continue anti-drug efforts while placing greater emphasis on prevention and rehabilitation programs.
- June 30 – President Rodrigo Duterte ended his six-year term in office. Government figures reported more than 6,200 deaths during official anti-drug operations since 2016.
- July 1 – Presidency of Bongbong Marcos assumed office and announced that the anti-drug campaign would continue but with greater emphasis on prevention, rehabilitation, and targeting major traffickers.
- July 18 – In his first State of the Nation Address, President Marcos reaffirmed the government's commitment to combating illegal drugs while emphasizing human rights-based enforcement.
- September 23 – The Department of Justice reported that additional cases involving deaths during anti-drug operations remained under review as part of ongoing investigations.
- October 8–9 – In what became known as the October 2022 Manila drug raids, Philippine National Police Drug Enforcement Group seized over 990 kilograms of illegal drugs in Pasig and Manila. The series of raids had been described by former DILG Secretary Benjamin Abalos Jr. as the "biggest drug haul in the history of the Philippines".
- December 31 – Government statistics indicated that anti-drug operations conducted throughout 2022 resulted in thousands of arrests and continued nationwide enforcement against illegal drugs.

=== 2023 ===
- January 27 – The International Criminal Court authorized the reopening of its investigation into killings associated with former President Rodrigo Duterte's anti-drug campaign, citing concerns that domestic investigations had not sufficiently addressed alleged crimes against humanity.
- March 14 – Former police officer Jeffrey Perez was convicted for the murders of teenagers Carl Angelo Arnaiz and Reynaldo de Guzman, one of the few convictions linked to drug war killings.
- March 28 – President Bongbong Marcos announced that the Philippines would cease engagement with the ICC after the court rejected the government's appeal to suspend its investigation into drug war killings.
- April 22 – Alleged drug pusher and hired gun Ricky Lopez Manuel was killed in a buy-bust operation in Mandaue City.
- August 2 – Cousins Vincent Repangue Arriesgado and Jerome Arriesgado were shot dead by motorcycle-riding assailants in a case classified by DAHAS as drug-related violence.
- September 18 – Body of Dhinz Adzyl Abadilla Zabala, a 32-year-old tattoo artist, was dumped in Barangay Sambag 1 in Cebu City. He had multiple gunshot wounds to the back of the head. Suspects of his murder, Tereso Dayupay Jr. and Estepan Estrera Canoy, were apprehended by the PNP. Both were known hired guns and members of a drug syndicate.
- September 22 – Alleged drug suspect Muksidal Jumadil was killed during a firefight with police in Panamao, Sulu, while authorities were serving arrest warrants. Nine members of the Philippine National Police Special Action Force were wounded: Nolie Agmaliw, Jhorlino Rico Apal, Earl Abdurajan III, Reymir Subion, Lindo Macua, Oliver Alviar, Andres Dalang, Edison Ray Paris, and Lionel Suaverdes.
- October 29 – SWAT officer Police Staff Sgt. Michael Malan was killed in a raid on alleged drug suspects Glen “Bongbong” Iturriaga and Ivan Palmejar in Iloilo City.
- November 15 – Staff Sergeant Ryan Languido Baculi, a member of the Regional Police Drug Enforcement Unit 7, was killed during a drug bust in Sitio Pagtambayayong, Barangay Kinasang-an, Cebu City.

=== 2024 ===
- March 14 – A drug suspect, identified only as “Bentong,” was killed in a buy-bust operation in Barangay Maa, Davao City after allegedly trading fire with undercover police officers.
- March 28 – At least seven drug suspects were killed in separate buy-bust operations in Davao City and nearby areas amid intensified anti-drug operations.
- April 23 – Paul John Seguerra, an inmate facing drug charges, escaped from the Southern Leyte Provincial Jail with two others by scaling a fence. They were shot and killed hours later in Barangay Asuncion, Maasin by unknown suspects.
- June 15 – A suspected drug dealer, Jeffrey Sobusa Pudadera, was killed in a shootout with PDEA agents in Koronadal City after allegedly firing at undercover operatives during a buy-bust operation.
- September 13 – Joeraldine Gevana, a known drug personality, was killed in a shootout with the PNP in Barangay Jampang, Argao. Gevana was armed with a sniper rifle and managed to wound the police chief, Major Janus Giangan, before being taken down.
- November 13 – The House of Representatives Quad Committee (Quadcom) held a major public hearing on the Duterte administration's war on drugs, extrajudicial killings, and alleged reward systems for police involved in anti-drug operations. Former President Rodrigo Duterte attended the hearing and defended his anti-drug policies amid intense questioning from lawmakers.
- November 15 – Two police officers were killed and two others injured during a buy-bust operation in Maguindanao del Norte after the operation escalated into a firefight with armed drug suspects.
- December 10 – The House Quad Committee announced plans to recommend criminal and administrative charges against individuals linked to illegal drugs, extrajudicial killings, and related crimes investigated during its hearings.

=== 2025 ===
- February 20 – Suspected drug den operator identified as alias “Tata” was killed in a firefight with police, military, and PDEA operatives during a buy-bust operation in Buluan, Maguindanao del Sur after allegedly opening fire on arresting officers.
- March 8 – Police Staff Sergeants Dennis Cudiamat and Gian George Dela Cruz were killed in a buy-bust operation in Bocaue, Bulacan after suspects opened fire during an anti-firearms and anti-drug sting operation. Authorities said the suspects fled with the officers’ firearms after the shootout.
- March 11 – Former President Rodrigo Duterte was arrested and flown to The Hague to face charges for crimes against humanity related to the Philippine drug war.
- March 14 – Former President Rodrigo Duterte appeared in videolink before the ICC, officially starting his trial.
- April 9 – A suspected drug dealer identified only as “Sady” was killed in a buy-bust operation in Parañaque City after allegedly drawing a firearm during a transaction with PDEA operatives, while four PDEA agents were wounded in the ensuing gunfight.
- August 7 – Criminal Investigation and Detection Group officer Patrolman Ferry Sida Jaso and suspect Abner Casador were both killed in a shootout in San Jose, Dinagat Islands after Casador allegedly opened fire during surveillance and arrest operations related to illegal firearms and suspected drug activity.
- September 5 – Suspected drug trafficker Stephen Dagismol was killed in Surallah, South Cotabato after allegedly selling shabu to undercover police officers and drawing a firearm when he discovered he was dealing with law enforcement.
- November 18 – Three suspected drug offenders were killed in a buy-bust operation in Quezon City conducted by the PNP after allegedly opening fire on operatives during a ₱68-million shabu sting operation.

=== 2026 ===
- May 5 – A man recently released from prison due to drug charges was shot dead by a gunman in General Mariano Alvarez, Cavite.
- May 13 – During an alleged arrest of Senator Ronald dela Rosa, who had been issued with an arrest warrant by the ICC for his role in the drug war, a gunfight erupted at the Senate Chamber of the GSIS Building. Senator dela Rosa escaped the premises with assistance from fellow senator Robin Padilla.
- May 25 – A shootout occurred between Police Corporal Bixby Johnson A. Cular and a drug lord nicknamed "Reo" in Barangay Busay, Barugo, Leyte. An initial investigation stated that the policeman, who was a member of an intelligence unit, was waylaid by the armed drug lord. The latter fired first and missed, prompting the policeman to return fire, hitting the suspect in the left arm. Reo was then rushed to a hospital for treatment.
- June 30 – Two mechanics was shot dead by unknown suspects in Taguig. The PNP managed to chase the killers along the C5 Road. But during the running gun-battle, the suspects escaped. Investigators believe that competition in the sale of illegal narcotics was the cause.
- July 7 – Two policemen, Joerel Bullos and Apollo Pagurayan, were ambushed and killed while riding a motorcycle in Lambayong, Sultan Kudarat, by unknown assailants armed with M16 rifle. Both were killed on the spot. Investigators believe their deaths may have been related to recent anti-illegal drug operations and campaigns against smuggled contraband in Lambayong.
- August 9 – A PDEA intelligence officer named Enfernie Jim Dayag was killed in a buy-bust operation that targeted Jimhar Jawadil, a former Abu Sayyaf operative. Jawadil and 5 of his cohorts were also killed in the 20-minute gunfight.
- August 17 – An armed confrontation between the Police Regional Office-Northern Mindanao and members of the alleged Masaronay Group resulted in the death of the latter's leader, aliased "Talib". The suspect was listed as the number seven most wanted person in Lanao del Norte. The Masaronay Group is allegedly involved in drug-trafficking as well as financing terroristic activities of the Dawlah Islamiyah-Maute Group.
- September 30 – DILG Secretary Jonvic Remulla ordered a crackdown on a street gang known as True Brown Style for alleged grooming of minors to commit crimes. Many of its members had been linked to drug-related offenses.
- October 1 – A private jet bound for the Philippines, containing over 521 kilograms of methamphetamines that's worth ₱3.5 million, was captured in Laos. The shipment was allegedly organized by members of the PNP and former Bangsamoro Parliament member, including Edrieza Hadji Nasser Rimbang.
- October 2 – An alleged drug den in Tondo, Manila was fired upon by four assailants, killing two people. One of the assailants was seen in a CCTV footage wearing a bulletproof vest.
