= Bong Go =

Senator of the Philippines since 2019 (born 1974)

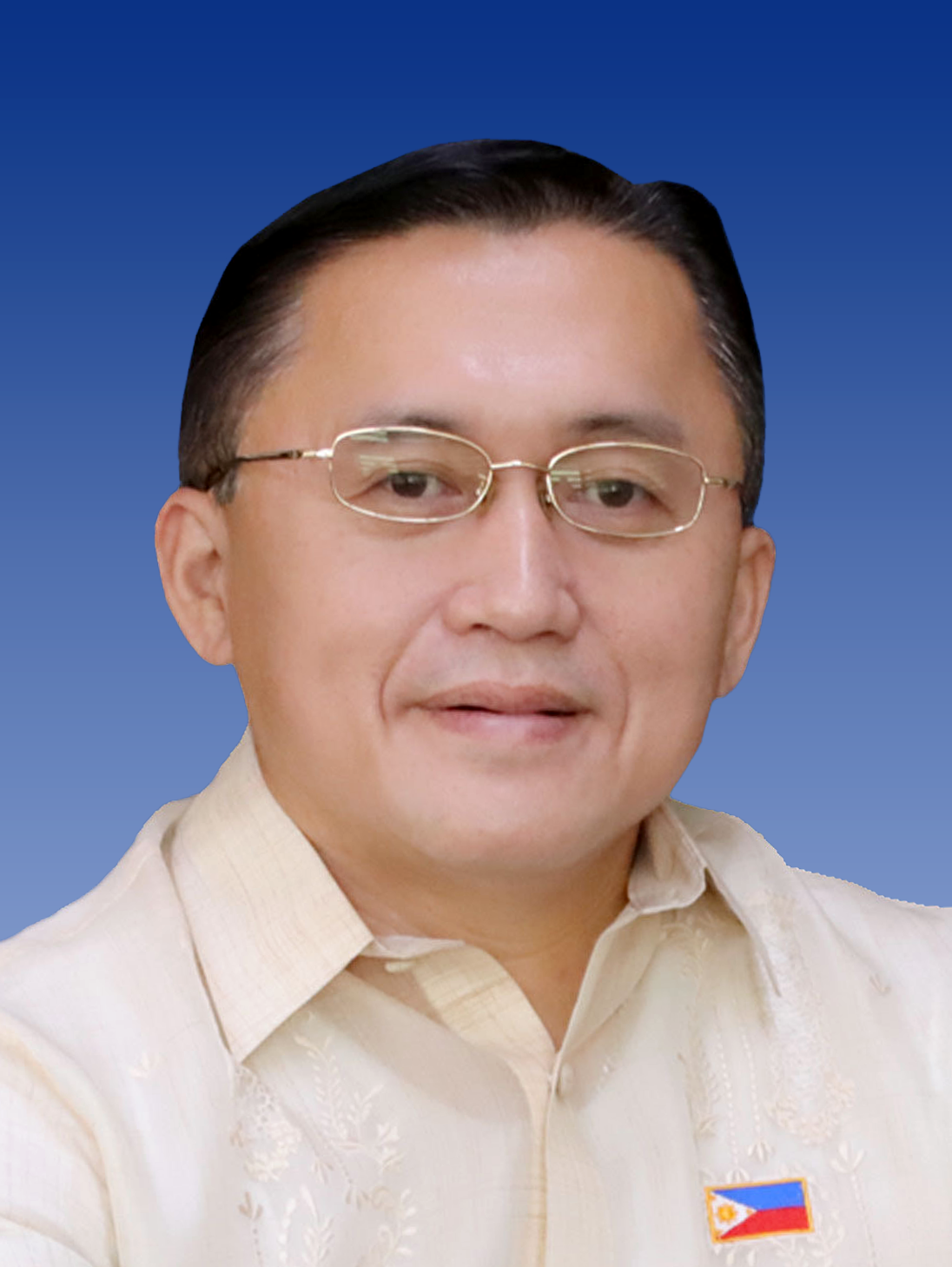
- Portrait of Go as member of the Philippine Commission on Appointments

Senator of the Philippines
- Incumbent
- Assumed office June 30, 2019

Chair of the Senate Youth Committee
- Incumbent
- Assumed office July 23, 2024
- Preceded by: Sonny Angara

Chair of the Senate Sports Committee
- Incumbent
- Assumed office July 22, 2019
- Preceded by: Panfilo Lacson

Chair of the Senate Health and Demography Committee
- In office July 22, 2019 – September 9, 2025
- Preceded by: JV Ejercito
- Succeeded by: Risa Hontiveros

1st Special Assistant to the President
- In office June 30, 2016 – October 15, 2018
- President: Rodrigo Duterte
- Preceded by: Position established
- Succeeded by: Jesus Melchor Quitain

Head of the Presidential Management Staff
- In office June 30, 2016 – October 15, 2018
- President: Rodrigo Duterte
- Preceded by: Julia Abad
- Succeeded by: Jesus Melchor Quitain

Personal details
- Born: Christopher Lawrence Tesoro Go; June 14, 1974 (age 52) Davao City, Philippines
- Party: PDP (since 2018)
- Other political affiliations: PDDS (2021); HNP (2018–2019)
- Spouse: Emmylou Cruz
- Children: 2
- Relatives: Richard Mata (uncle)
- Education: De La Salle University; Ateneo de Davao University (BS)
- Website: Official website
- Basketball career

Personal information
- Listed height: 5 ft 6 in (1.68 m)
- Position: Guard
- Number: 18

Career history
- 2018–2019: Muntinlupa Cagers

Christopher Lawrence "Bong" Tesoro Go (Tagalog: [bɔŋ ˈɡɔ]; born June 14, 1974) is a Filipino politician serving as a senator since 2019. He previously served under the administration of President Rodrigo Duterte as Special Assistant to the President and Head of the Presidential Management Staff from 2016 to 2018. Go served as Duterte's personal aide and special assistant from 1998 to 2025, although he focused more on his senatorial duties after his election in 2019. Go was reelected to the Senate in 2025, earning the most number of votes in a senate election in Philippine history.

In a 2020 affidavit submitted to the International Criminal Court, Go was accused by former policeman-contract killer Arturo Lascañas of being closely involved in the operations of the Davao Death Squad during Duterte's tenure as mayor of Davao City, although he has denied the allegations.

== Early life and education ==
Go was born on June 14, 1974, to a Chinese Filipino family. He is the son of Davao-based businessman Desiderio Go and Batangas-native Marichu Tesoro-Go. He is a grandson of August Tesoro, who founded one of the largest printing companies in Davao City.

Go attended La Salle Green Hills during his high school years. He initially took up a management degree in De La Salle University but transferred to and eventually graduated from Ateneo de Davao University with a bachelor's degree in marketing.

== Career ==
=== Duterte's aide (1998–present) ===
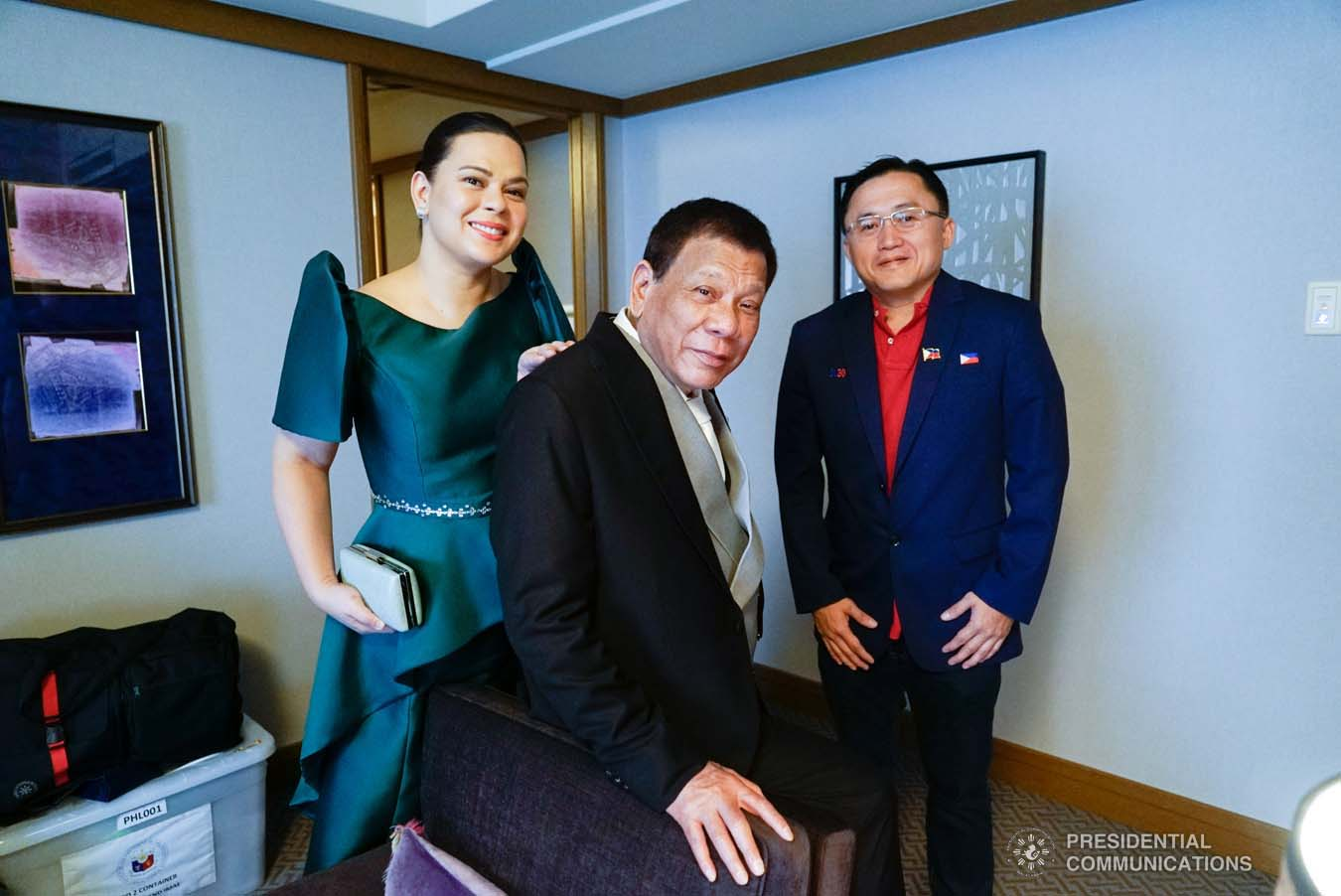
Go (right) with President Rodrigo Duterte (center) and Davao City Mayor Sara Duterte in October 2019

Since 1998, Go has served as executive assistant and personal aide for then-Davao City 1st district Representative Rodrigo Duterte. He replaced Duterte's aide who died during a basketball game. Duterte was later elected mayor of Davao City in 2001, vice mayor in 2010, and mayor once again in 2013. Being in charge of both personal and official matters, Go has called himself Duterte's all around utility man. Go is among the "Davao Boys", a small circle of Duterte's closest and trusted associates, who were later tasked with implementing the drug war nationwide.

During the 2016 election campaign season, Go was often described as the "national photobomber" by the media, for being always in the photos at the side of Duterte in his campaign sorties. He was one of the key people in Duterte's campaign for presidency. On October 15, 2015, Go filed Duterte's certificate of candidacy on Duterte's behalf at the Comelec office in Manila, for a re-election bid for the Davao City mayoralty post.

=== Special Assistant to the President (2016–2018) ===
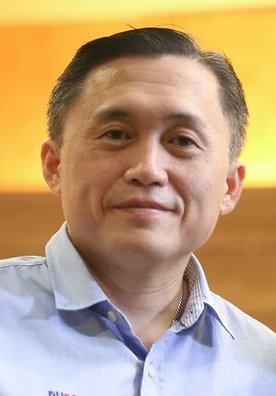
Go in 2018

On June 2, 2016, then-President-elect Rodrigo Duterte announced the appointment of Go as Special Assistant to the President and is tasked to provide general supervision to the Presidential Management Staff.

During Go's time as Special Assistant to the President, his alleged involvement in the Philippine Navy's ₱16 billion frigate deal was revealed by online news site Rappler. Pertinent documents that linked Go to the deal, detailing how he had interfered with the process, violating several procurement laws when he endorsed a supplier outside the bidding process were released to the public; Go denied the allegations, declaring that he would resign if ever he was proven guilty and said that the media and his critics were endangering national security. Vice Admiral Mercado of the Philippine Navy, who was allegedly sacked for questioning the frigate deal, has cleared Go of any involvement, claiming that Go had never communicated with those who were involved in the deal. Duterte defended Go, saying that "he owns a yacht, therefore he doesn't need to steal in the frigate deal". Malacañang also made their stand clear that Go did not intervene. A probe by the Senate regarding the deal was made, but did no further clarifications about Go's role on the deal.

During his time as Special Assistant to the President, Go became known for selfies he posted online, saying he values these images as part of his "personal collection".

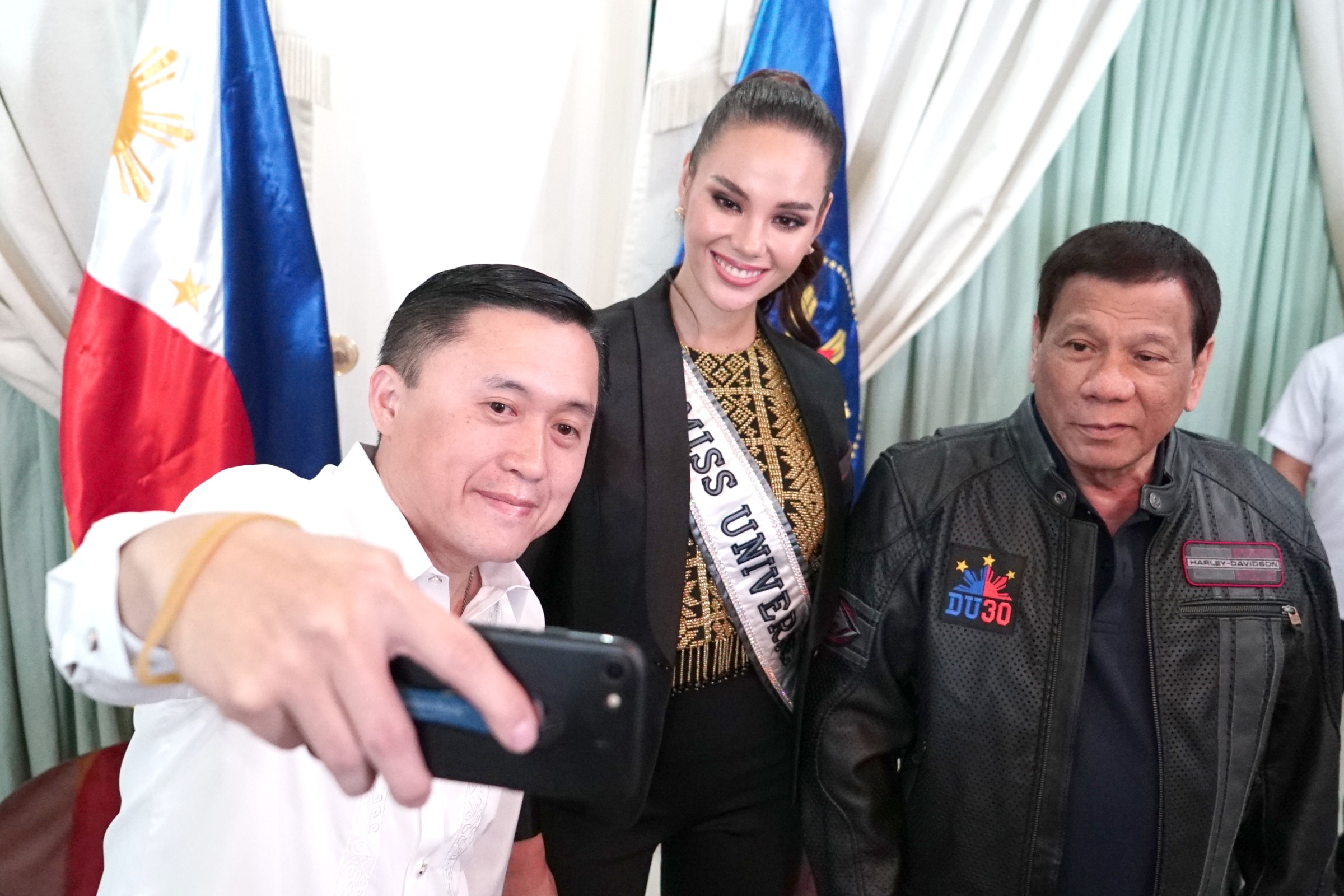
Go (left) with President Duterte (right) pose for a selfie with Miss Universe 2018 Catriona Gray (center), who paid a courtesy call with the President at the Villamor Air Base in Pasay on December 20, 2018.

=== Senator (2019–present) ===
Go made a formal bid for the Senate on October 15, 2018, when he filed his certificate of candidacy accompanied by President Rodrigo Duterte and other members of the president's Cabinet. Go's platform for his Senate bid included pledges to build healthcare and social service facilities called "Malasakit Centers" across the Philippines as well as the repeal of the Juvenile Justice law which sets the minimum age of criminal liability at 15 years old. Doubts about his capability to conduct a nationwide campaign was countered by President Duterte, noting that the Tesoros, Go's mother's family, own one of the largest printing firms in Mindanao.

Prior to his formal filing of candidacy, Go has been the subject of allegations of premature campaigning. In relief operations after a fire in Manila, relief goods with "Ready Set Go" branding were distributed alongside government relief goods provided by the Department of Social Welfare and Development. Go has repeatedly denied that he was personally involved in the production or distribution of any merchandise, once citing his supporters as producing them without his consent and on one occasion said that it was done under the President's directive. Go also urged his supporters to stop "politicizing" their cause by using his name and likeness. Calls for tarpaulins bearing his image to be removed had made the rounds in social media.

==== 18th Congress ====
Go received roughly 21 million votes during the May 2019 election and was sworn into office after placing third overall; he officially took his seat in the Senate beginning his term on June 30, 2019. On his first months in office, Go had filed several bills including creating a Department of Disaster Resilience, the postponement of the 2020 Sangguniang Kabataan elections on the barangay level, and a bill co-authored with fellow Senator Manny Pacquiao reinstating the death penalty for heinous crimes such as illegal drugs, plunder, rape, and murder.

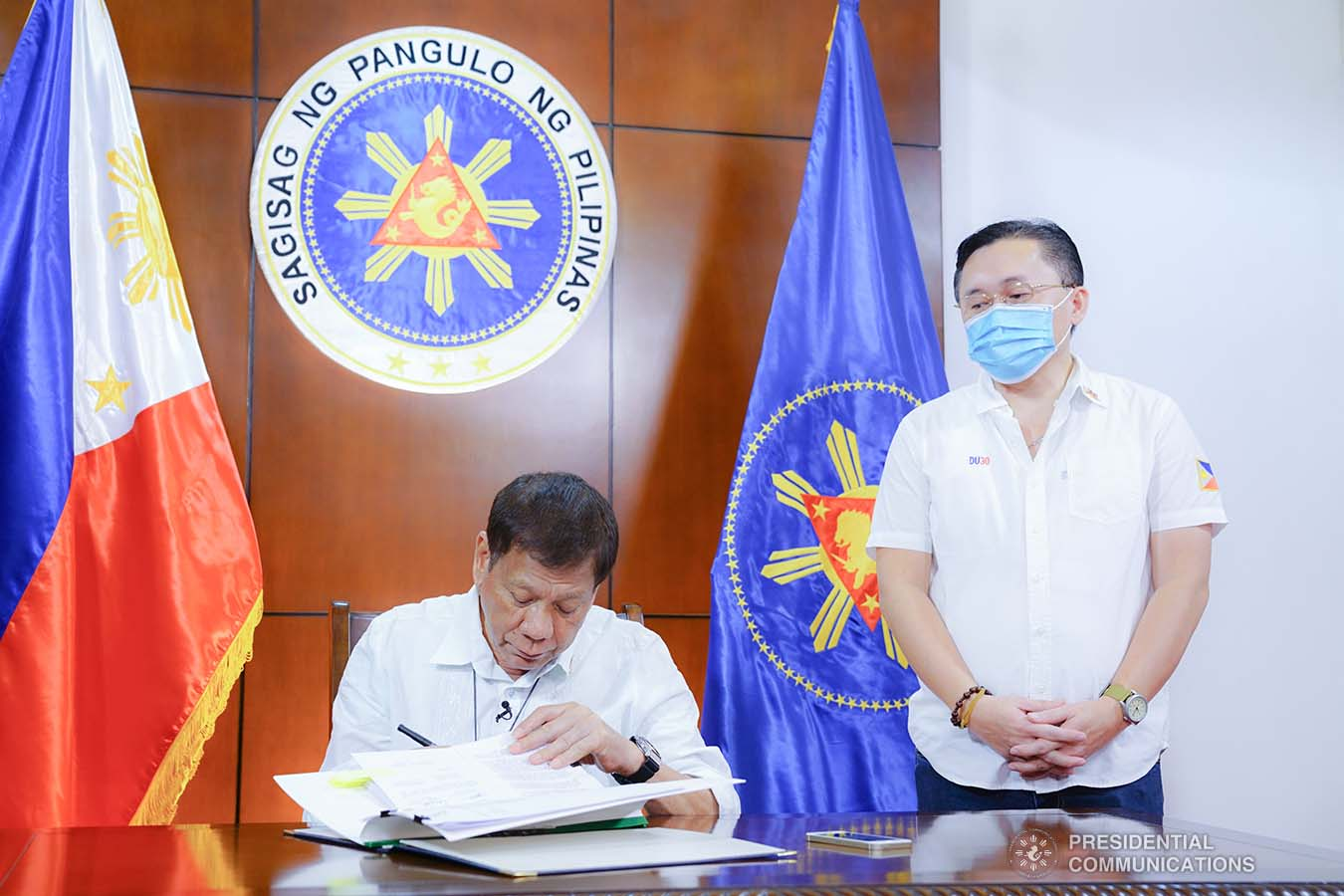
Bong Go witnesses President Rodrigo Duterte sign into law the establishment of the National Academy of Sports in June 2020.

In 2019, Go authored the Malasakit Center Act, which meant to serve as one-stop for easy access to medical and financial assistance needed to receive health care services; the bill was later enacted into law by President Duterte. Amid the COVID-19 pandemic, Go proposed the Balik Probinsya program, which meant to decongest the overcrowded Metro Manila once the coronavirus pandemic is put under control; the program was institutionalized by President Duterte on May 6 via Executive Order No. 114. In July 2019, Go called for the creation of a separate department dedicated to overseas Filipino workers; a law creating the Department of Migrant Workers was signed by President Duterte two years later. Go was briefly involved in a controversy on July 17, 2020, when a college student was served a subpoena order by the National Bureau of Investigation after Go complained of the student sharing a post on social media possibly containing fake news that was critical of Go.

Go advocated for the establishment of the Virology Science and Technology Institute of the Philippines (VIP) and the Philippine Center for Disease Control and Prevention (CDC); he supported the creation of Super Health Centers around the country to help reduce hospital occupancy rates. On October 29, 2021, Go led the opening of the country's 146th Malasakit Center at the Las Piñas General Hospital and Satellite Trauma Center in Las Piñas City—reaching a milestone for the said program being the 30th in Metro Manila and the first in the city. On September 21, 2021, Republic Act No. 11590, the law legalizing Philippine Offshore Gaming Operators (POGOs), was signed into law by President Duterte. Bong Go voted in favor of the law.

==== 2022 elections ====
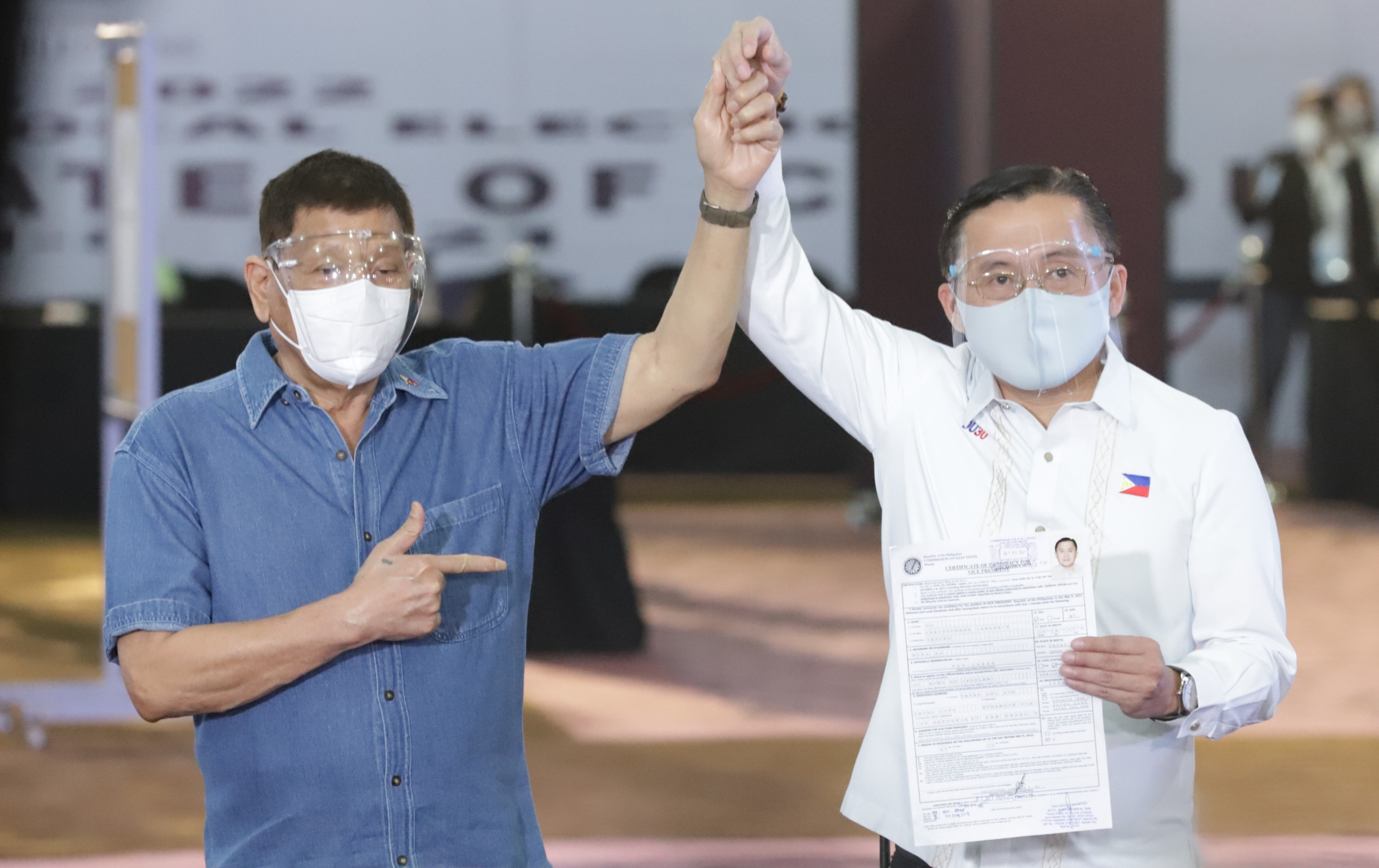
Go filed his certificate of candidacy for vice president on October 2, 2021.

PDP-Laban initially nominated Go to be their presidential candidate, with President Duterte as their candidate for vice president on September 8, 2021. However, Duterte withdrew from his vice presidential bid, and Go filed a certificate of candidacy for the position of vice president instead on October 2, 2021. Fellow senator Ronald dela Rosa then became Go's running mate after dela Rosa unexpectedly filed his certificate of candidacy on October 8.

Dela Rosa later withdrew his bid under the directive of PDP-Laban; Go also followed suit withdrawing his bid for the vice presidency on November 13, 2021. Go then announced that he would be running for president instead, albeit under the Pederalismo ng Dugong Dakilang Samahan (PDDS) party rather than PDP-Laban; he substituted the candidacy of PDDS' Grepor Belgica, father of Greco Belgica. Go explained that he withdrew his bid to run for vice president to avoid complicating the campaign of Sara Duterte who launched her own vice president bid under Lakas–CMD. Despite officially running for a different party, he vowed to continue to the plans of incumbent President Duterte's administration.

The faction of PDP–Laban led by Alfonso Cusi allowed Go to run under a different party as a bid to avoid complications since the party was under a leadership dispute. The other faction was led by Manny Pacquiao and Koko Pimentel, who disputed the legitimacy of Cusi's faction as representatives of the party. Cusi's side anticipated that there would be legal issues if Go substituted the candidacy of dela Rosa as president if the COMELEC ruled dela Rosa's candidacy as invalid. Cusi's PDP-Laban adopted and endorsed Go as their presidential candidate for the 2022 election. The Go campaign had no formal vice president candidate since President Duterte had endorsed his daughter Sara Duterte as Go's vice president.

On November 30, 2021, Go announced he would be dropping out of the presidential race, saying his heart and mind contradicted his actions, and cited his family's opposition to his move to run as president. He formally withdrew from the presidential race on December 14, 2021.

==== 19th Congress ====
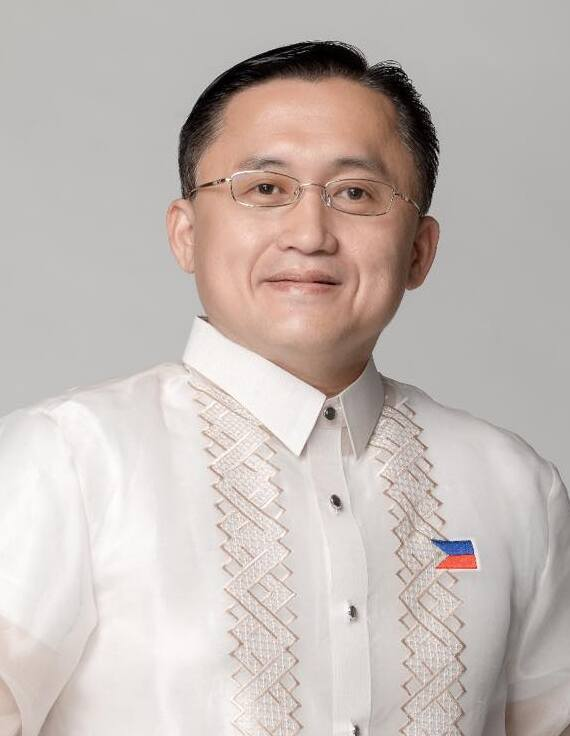
Official portrait, 2022

At the start of the 19th Congress in July 2022, Go filed his priority bills seeking to create the Department of Disaster Resilience and requiring the establishment of evacuation centers in all provinces, cities, and municipalities. He also filed bills institutionalizing the Department of Trade and Industry's One Town, One Product (OTOP) program to improve innovation among MSMEs; requiring Drug Abuse Treatment and Rehabilitation Centers to be established nationwide; creating the Philippine National Games; providing compensation to Barangay Health Workers; and enacting a "Magna Carta for Barangays".

In January 2023, Go—together with senators Ronald dela Rosa, Mark Villar, and Francis Tolentino—filed a bill seeking to provide additional benefits to former Philippine presidents for their performance of "post-presidential duties" which include meetings with foreign and local public officials.

In July 2024, former senator and Duterte's staunch critic Antonio Trillanes IV filed plunder charges against Go and former President Duterte, accusing Go of "unduly enriching himself" by allegedly using "his position, authority and influence to corner billions worth of government projects in favor of his father and brother". Trillanes further alleged that Go's father and brother were awarded ₱6.6 billion worth of government contracts. Trillanes based his case on a Philippine Center for Investigative Journalism 2018 report stating that CLTG Builders was awarded ₱4.6 billion government contracts while Alfrego Builders, owned by Go's brother, won ₱1.74 billion worth of projects. Trillanes also accused Go and Duterte of violating Republic Act No. 3019 (The Anti-Graft and Corrupt Practices Act) and Republic Act No. 6713 (The Code of Conduct and Ethical Standards for Public Officials and Employees). In August 2024, Trillanes furthermore filed with the DOJ plunder under Republic Act No. 7080 and graft cases against Go, Rodrigo Duterte, and former Philippine Navy chief Vice Admiral Robert Empedrad regarding what Trillanes claimed as the allegedly anomalous ₱16-billion acquisition contract of the Philippines' first two frigates, BRP Jose Rizal (FF-150) and BRP Antonio Luna (FF-151), with HD Hyundai Heavy Industries.

In September 9, 2024, Go changed his position on Philippine Offshore Gaming Operators (POGOs), expressing his opposition to it due to its links with Chinese illegal activities. Go and 17 other senators previously supported POGOs by voting in favor of a law signed in September 2021 by President Duterte that imposed additional taxes on POGOs nationwide. Go falsely claimed that he has long been against POGOs, and was fact-checked and noted his previous support for POGO-related legislation.

==== 2025 senatorial campaign ====
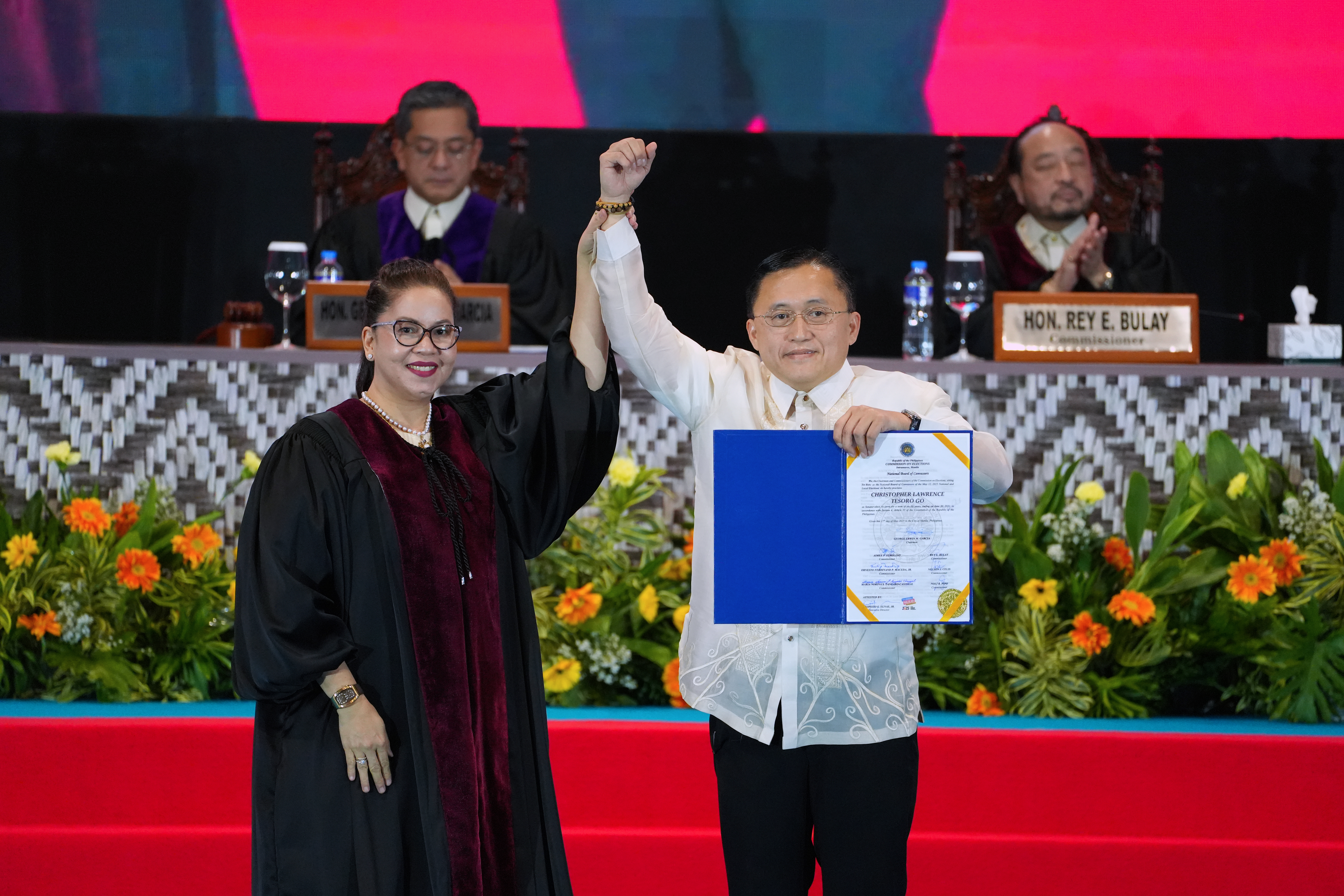
Go being proclaimed as a senator-elect on May 17, 2025

On October 3, 2024, Go filed his candidacy for the 2025 Philippine Senate elections under the Duterte-led Partido Demokratiko Pilipino (PDP), which eventually became DuterTen. Go would later garner the most votes and end up to be the top notcher of the election, gaining 27,121,073 votes and 47.29% of the vote. Go pledged to focus on public health.

==== 20th Congress ====
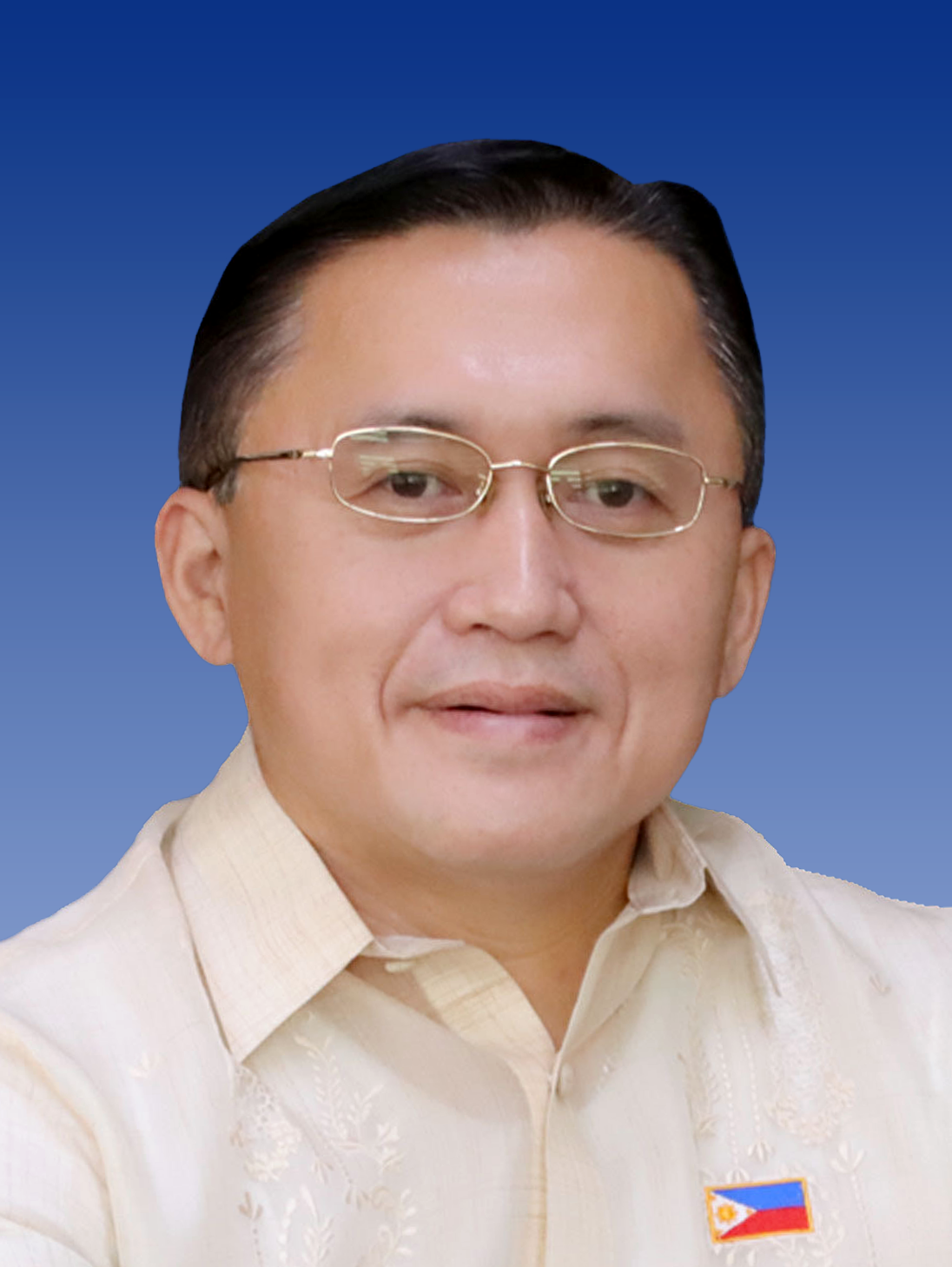
Go's Commission on Appointments portrait for the 20th Congress

In August 2025, it has been alleged that Go's father Deciderio Go owns CLTG Builders (the initials stand for Bong Go's full name, Christopher Lawrence Tesoro Go), which facilitated a joint-venture with Sarah Discaya's St. Gerrard Construction. which was the top 1 contractor under the Duterte presidency. Go denied these claims.

== Personal life ==
Go is married to Emmylou Cruz, with whom he has two children. His eldest son, Christian Lawrence (Chrence), became a certified public accountant in 2019, placing third in the October licensure exam, and was elected vice mayor of Lupon, Davao Oriental, in 2025. He is also a nephew of internet personality and pediatrician Richard Mata, as Go's mother is Mata's cousin.

Beyond politics, Bong Go is also an avid basketball fan. He has participated in amateur leagues and guested in prominent local basketball events in the country. Go usually watches the Philippine Basketball Association (PBA). He joined the three-point shooting competition of the 2018 PBA All-Star Week. Along with Senators Sonny Angara and Joel Villanueva, Go was featured in a three-point shoot out exhibition during the 2018 FIBA 3x3 World Cup which was hosted in Bocaue, Bulacan.

Go also joined the roster of the Muntinlupa Cagers in the Maharlika Pilipinas Basketball League (MPBL). This move was objected by his critics as using the MPBL as a platform for his senatorial bid in 2019. Go defended the move saying he just wanted to promote basketball in the country and acknowledged his old age and the superior height of his opponents. He rarely played appearing in only one season with the team, as his primary focus on his Senate job and on assisting Rodrigo Duterte.

== Controversy ==
=== CLTG Builders ===
In 2018, the Philippine Center for Investigative Journalism published an article on CLTG Builders, which has received more than PhP1.85 billion in public infrastructure projects in the Davao Region from the Department of Public Works and Highways (DPWH). CLTG's listed owners are the father of Bong Go, Deciderio Go, and his half-brother. CLTG coincides with the initials of Christopher Lawrence Tesoro Go. The report indicated that the projects as of 2018 have been unfinished. Go denied owning CLTG, and accused the PCIJ report as malicious. Go said "Being related to me does not disqualify them to bid. These projects are publicly bid anyway. I never intervened nor influenced the DPWH on how they bid or award these projects. My office does not control DPWH to begin with." This said despite Republic Act 6713 prevents relatives of public officials from receiving contracts in government projects.

On July 5, 2024, former Senator Antonio Trillanes IV filed plunder charges at the Department of Justice against former President Rodrigo Duterte and Senator Go for their connection in the anomalous awarding of 184 contracts to CLTG Builders and Alfrego Builders, owned by Go's brother, amounting to about PhP6.6 billion. Go and Duterte were accused of violating RA 6713, RA 3019 (Anti-Graft and Corrupt Practices Act), and RA 7080 (Anti-Plunder Act).

As the flood control scandal became the top news in August 2025, news came out that CLTG Builders signed joint venture bids with key contractor St. Gerrard Construction, owned by Sarah Discaya, at the DPWH amounting to ₱816.98 million (US$16.59 million) in 2017. The joint venture had five infrastructure projects in Davao. Bong Go's father Desiderio Go signed contracts with DPWH as the "Authorized Managing Officer" and represented the two companies. According to the DPWH database, the five joint projects for road construction have already been completed. Go denied involvement in the projects awarded to CLTG Builders.

=== Philippine Navy Frigate Procurement Scandal ===
On December 18, 2017, various news agencies broke out the rumor that Philippine Navy Flag Officer-in-Command (FOIC) VAdm. Ronald Joseph Mercado, who was supposed to serve until his retirement until March 2018, was abruptly relieved by the Armed Forces of the Philippines, Chief-of-Staff, Gen. Rey Leonardo Guerrero. The official confirmation of VAdm. Mercado's relief was issued by the AFP the following day. The AFP Spokesperson Col. Edgar Arevalo informed that the AFP was simply following instructions from higher authorities, and the reasons for VAdm. Mercado's relief will be given in due time. VAdm. Mercado was replaced by RAdm. Robert Empedrad, as Acting FOIC.

News would detail that VAdm. Mercado's abrupt relief came after his clash with Department of National Defense (DND) officials over the PhP 15.7 billion Frigate Acquisition Project (FAP). The FAP was already signed and awarded during the Pres. Benigno Aquino's administration to Hyundai Heavy Industries (HHI) for the building of two frigates. However, delays in the construction was mainly in the final selection of the Combat Management System (CMS).

The CMS preferred by the Philippine Navy's Technical Working Group (TWG) for the FAP was the Tacticos of Nederlands Thales, as this already had a proven Link 16 operability, which was used by the Philippine Navy and its allies. HHI was pushing for the Hanwha Thales CMS, which was used by the Republic of Korea Navy. DND Secretary Delfin Lorenzana would later admit that VAdm. Mercado was relieved due to insubordination and his causing of the delay in the selection of the CMS, as he was pushing for Tacticos.

The Philippine Daily Inquirer however was able to acquire documents where it would prove that Malacanang already had special interest in the FAP as early as January 2017. Sec. Lorenzana sent a note to the Philippine Navy to respond to Special Assistant to the President Sec. Bong Go's question on the CMS preference. Lorenzana's letter had an attached unsigned letter from Go, criticizing the selection of Tacticos by the Philippine Navy, and raised the positive features of Hanwha's Naval Shield Integrated Combat Management System (ICMS). Sec. Go's letter also included a white paper from Hanwha.

Former PMS Undersecretary Lloyd Christopher Lao would confirm the authenticity of Sec. Go's letter to Sec. Lorenzana, and it was normal procedure for their office to take action when they receive a complaint. The complainant in this case at the OSAS and PMS was HHI over the preference of the Philippine Navy for Tacticos. USec. Lao would also confirm that they have invited RAdm. Empedrad, who at that time was the chief of the TWG of the FAP, to Malacañang Palace to provide clarification on the matter.

The fallout would put Go's influence and Lao's actions under scrutiny, causing the relief of a career naval officer, VAdm. Mercado. President Duterte would extend himself and defend Go from the issue. Go offered to resign, but Duterte refused this. VAdm. Mercado would later defend Go and say he never had any discussion with Go over Hanwha or the FAP.

During the Congressional hearing of August 2021 on the Covid-19 pandemic government procurements, Probinsyano Ako Cong. Jose Bonito Singson questioned Lao on his involvement in the FAP fiasco. Lao denied knowing anything about the issue twice. Cong. Singson presented a letter written by Lao to the RAdm. Empedrad on the CMS procurement. Lao would correct himself, confirm he wrote the letter, and admit that he was involved in the FAP mainly to address the complaint of the HHI.

On August 6, 2024, former Senator Antonio Trillanes IV, a former Philippine Navy officer, filed a plunder case against former President Rodrigo Duterte, Sen. Bong Go, Defense USec. Raymundo Elefante, former Navy FOIC VAdm. Empedrad, and Lao.

=== Davao Death Squad ===
During the 2024 House of Representatives Quad Comm Hearing, retired Police Colonel Royina Garma disclosed that there was an existence of the Davao Death Squad (DDS), and that Bong Go who was then a special assistant to Mayor Rodrigo Duterte had his own death squad. She said that Duterte would provide public funds from the Davao City government running in the millions to Go for a reward system. This would also corroborate the testimonies submitted to the International Criminal Court by former Davao policeman Arturo Lascañas and Edgar Matobato. Lascañas would testify that Go beginning 1999 himself would hand the death squad leaders the reward money. He also claimed that Go would receive information on the target from the Land Transportation Office in Davao. During Garma's confession, she admitted to the Quad Comm that she and her Philippine National Police Academy classmates met with Duterte before his ascendancy to the Presidency, and they received the marching orders to implement the "Davao Model" for the Philippine drug war. The Davao Model would be the utilization of a reward system for every suspected drug personality killed during the drug war. Go would deny these allegations.

Lascañas would also disclose that Duterte provided the funds to the Davao Death Squad through the ghost employees of Davao City. The COA took note in 2015 that Davao government had 11,000 ghost employees. Former policeman Jovie Espenido would also confirm that Go handed them reward money from Duterte for any and all confirmed kills in Davao.

Sen. Bato dela Rosa on October 14, 2024, would disclose that Duterte mainly gave additional allowance to policemen in Davao and there was no reward system.

Former President Duterte would attend the Quad Comm hearing on November 11, 2024, and would admit to a reward system saying it was "natural" for a mayor to do this. He didn't disclose the source of the funds but confirmed this was from "confidential funds." Later he would admit that these were from surplus campaign funds. Duterte also confirmed being involved in the killing of 6 individuals.

On December 18, 2024, the Quad Comm recommended filing charges of crimes against humanity against Duterte, Sen. Bong Go, Sen. Bato dela Rosa, former PNP Chiefs Oscar Albayalde, Debold Sinas, Royina Garma, Edilberto Leonardo, and Garma's aide Irmina "Muking" Espino.

On June 11, 2025, two weeks before the close of the 19th Congress, the QuadCom came out with the report providing for further investigation of Go and other personalities, such as former Presidential Spokesperson Harry Roque, and Alice Guo, for their involvement in a reward system during the Duterte drug war.

On February 13, 2026, the ICC included Go among eight indirect co-perpetrators in the crimes against humanity case against president Duterte during the Philippine drug war.

== Electoral history ==
Electoral history of Bong Go
Year	Office	Party	Votes received				Result
Year	Office	Party	Total	%	P.	Swing	Result
2019	Senator of the Philippines	PDP	20,657,702	43.68%	3rd	—N/a	Won
2025	Senator of the Philippines	PDP	27,121,073	47.29%	1st	+3.61	Won

Political offices
New office	Special Assistant to the President; 2016–2018	Succeeded by Ferdinand B. Cui Jr. as Officer in Charge
Preceded by Julia Abad	Head of the Presidential Management Staff; 2016–2018	Succeeded by Jesus Melchor Quitain
