= 2007 Davao del Norte local elections =

Philippine election

- May 14, 2007
Candidate	Rodolfo del Rosario	Gelacio Gementiza
Party	Lakas	UNO
Running mate	Victor Suaybaguio Jr.	—
Popular vote	197,205	67,471
Percentage	68.53	23.45
Governor before election
Gelacio Gementiza
Lakas
Elected Governor
Rodolfo del Rosario
Lakas

Local elections were held in the province of Davao del Norte on May 14, 2007, as part of the 2007 general election. The voters elected candidates for all local positions: a town mayor, vice mayor and town councilors, as well as members of the Sangguniang Panlalawigan, the vice-governor, governor and representatives for the two districts of Davao del Norte.

== Candidates ==
For Governor
Candidate	Party
Rodolfo del Rosario	Lakas–CMD
Jesus Gaviola	Independent
Gelacio Gementiza	UNO

For Vice-Governor
Candidate	Party
Shirley Belen Aala	KAMPI
Victorio Suaybaguio Jr.	Lakas–CMD

Representative/Board Members (1st District)
Candidate (Representatives)	Party
Pantaleon Alvarez	NPC
Arrel Olaño	Lakas–CMD
Candidate (Board Members)	Party
Rex Jasper Aala	Independent
Macario Bermudez II	Lakas–CMD
Virgilio Boiser	NPC
Cesar Cuntapay	PMP
Alfredo de Veyra	NPC
Jose Recarido Federiso	Lakas–CMD
Rogelio Israel	Lakas–CMD
Roger Laguna	Independent
Antonio Lagunzad	Lakas–CMD
Leopoldo Monteroso	Lakas–CMD

Representative/Board Members (2nd District)
Candidate (Representative)	Party
Antonio Lagdameo Jr.	Lakas–CMD
Rolando Sta. Ana	KAMPI
Candidate (Board Members)	Party
Rolando Cadano	Independent
Jose Cate	KAMPI
Ely Dacalus	Lakas–CMD
Gregorio Facula	Lakas–CMD
Janet Gavina	Lakas–CMD
Salvador Royo	Lakas–CMD
Artemio San Juan	Lakas–CMD

== Provincial elections ==
=== Governor ===
Incumbent Gelacio Gementiza is running for reelection against former Governor and Presidential Adviser for Government Centers Rodolfo del Rosario and Carmen Mayor Jesus Gaviola.

Candidate	Party	Votes	%
Rodolfo del Rosario	Lakas–CMD	197,205	68.53
Gelacio Gementiza	United Opposition	67,471	23.45
Jesus Gaviola	Independent	23,085	8.02
Total		287,761	100.00

=== Vice Governor ===
1st District Board Member Shirley Belen Alaa is running against Victor Suaybaguio Jr.

Candidate	Party	Votes	%
Victor Suaybaguio Jr.	Lakas–CMD	197,233	71.62
Shirley Belen Alaa	Kabalikat ng Malayang Pilipino	78,144	28.38
Total		275,377	100.00

=== Provincial board ===
==== First district ====
- City: Tagum
- Municipalities: Asuncion, Kapalong, New Corella, San Isidro, Talaingod

Candidate	Party	Votes	%
Rogelio Israel	Lakas–CMD	73,080	14.71
Macario Bermudez II	Lakas–CMD	69,177	13.93
Antonio Lagunzad	Lakas–CMD	62,704	12.62
Leopoldo Monteroso	Lakas–CMD	53,245	10.72
Jose Recarido Federiso	Lakas–CMD	46,773	9.42
Rex Jasper Alaa	Independent	45,008	9.06
Virgilio Boiser	Nationalist People's Coalition	44,448	8.95
Alfredo de Veyra	Nationalist People's Coalition	38,044	7.66
Roger Laguna	Independent	33,594	6.76
Cesar Cuntapay	Pwersa ng Masang Pilipino	30,594	6.16
Total		496,667	100.00

==== Second district ====
- City: Panabo, Samal
- Municipalities: Braulio E. Dujali, Carmen, Santo Tomas

Candidate	Party	Votes	%
Janet Gavina	Lakas–CMD	80,612	18.35
Salvador Royo	Lakas–CMD	74,620	16.98
Gregorio Facula	Lakas–CMD	72,742	16.55
Artemio San Juan	Lakas–CMD	70,237	15.98
Ely Dacalus	Lakas–CMD	66,157	15.06
Jose Cate	Kabalikat ng Malayang Pilipino	56,333	12.82
Rolando Cadano	Independent	18,721	4.26
Total		439,422	100.00

== Congressional elections ==
=== First district ===
Incumbent representative Arrel Olaño is running for reelection against former transportation and communications secretary Pantaleon Alvarez.

Candidate	Party	Votes	%
Arrel Olaño	Lakas–CMD	82,414	58.74
Pantaleon Alvarez	Nationalist People's Coalition	57,894	41.26
Total		140,308	100.00

=== Second district ===
Antonio Floirendo Jr. is term-limited. His nephew, businessman Antonio Lagdameo Jr. will run against Rolando Sta. Ana.

Candidate	Party	Votes	%
Antonio Lagdameo Jr.	Lakas–CMD	111,283	90.14
Rolando Sta. Ana	Kabalikat ng Malayang Pilipino	12,178	9.86
Total		123,461	100.00

== City and municipal elections ==
=== First district ===
==== Tagum ====
Candidate	Party	Votes	%
Rey Uy	Lakas–CMD	59,601	75.73
Meliton Lemos	United Opposition	19,102	24.27
Total		78,703	100.00

=== Second district ===
==== Panabo ====
Candidate	Party	Votes	%
Jose Silvosa Sr.	Kabalikat ng Malayang Pilipino	31,274	54.85
Ruperto Cagape Jr.	Lakas–CMD	25,746	45.15
Total		57,020	100.00

==== Samal ====
Incumbent mayor Rogelio Antalan is term limited. His brother, Aniano Antalan will run in his place.

Candidate	Party	Votes	%
Aniano Antalan	Lakas–CMD	15,149	41.19
Austerio Obenza	Kabalikat ng Malayang Pilipino	14,788	40.21
Pedro Durano	Pwersa ng Masang Pilipino	6,840	18.60
Total		36,777	100.00
