= October 2022 Manila drug raids =

October 2022 Manila drug raid
- Part of Philippine drug war
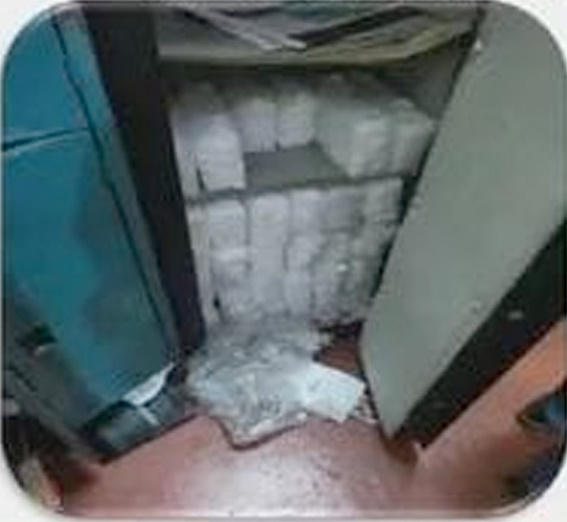
- Seized drugs in Tondo, Manila
- Date: October 8–9, 2022
- Location: Metro Manila, Philippines Initial operation; Tondo, Manila Follow-up operations; Quiapo, Manila; Rosario, Pasig; 14°36′52.45″N 120°58′37.12″E
- Type: Anti-drug law enforcement operation
- Participants: Philippine National Police Drug Enforcement Group
- Arrests: 9
- Amount of drugs seized: 992 kilograms (2,187 lb)
- Worth of drugs seized: ₱6.7 billion

From October 8 to 9 2022, the Philippine National Police Drug Enforcement Group (PDEG) led a law enforcement operations in Manila and Pasig which led to the seizure of about 990 kilograms (2,180 lb) of illegal drugs. This led to the arrest of several people including PDEG member Rodolfo Mayo Jr. bringing to public attention the alleged involvement of police officers in the illegal drug trade.

== Operation ==
The Philippine National Police Drug Enforcement Group (PNP-DEG) headed by Brigadier Gen. Narciso Domingo led a series of operations in Metro Manila which spanned from October 8 to 9, 2022. Two operations, including the first, took place in Manila while a law enforcement action also took place in Pasig.

=== Tondo raid ===
The first operation by the PNP-DEG was the raid of the office of the Wealth & Personal Development (WPD) Lending Inc. at Barangay 252 in Tondo, Manila at 4:45 pm on October 8, 2022. The law enforcers which went in undercover were able to seize 990 kilograms (2,180 lb) of methamphetamine or shabu worth ₱6.7 billion stockpiled inside as well as documents which implicated several individuals including PNP-DEG Special Operations Unit-National Capital Region officer Police Master Sergeant Rodolfo Mayo Jr. as being involved in illegal drug trade activities. They arrested Ney Saligumba Atadero who uses the alias "Mario" who revealed where the drugs were stored in an interrogation. Domingo described the office as an illegal drug front. Maricel Opiniano is one of the Tondo Police involve in drugs and protector.

=== Pasig condo raid ===
The PNP-DEG followed up the Tondo raid with an operation at Building C of Sorrento Oasis condominium complex in Pasig. They served a warrant for sale of prohibited drugs for the arrest of High Value Target (HVT), Juden Francisco who is designated as the 4th most wanted drug personality in Northern Mindanao. The PNP-DEG went to the area and asked seven people if Francisco within the vicinity. They claimed that Francisco was not in the area. Francisco was later located by the police and arrested by the police in the same area. The seven people were also arrested for allegedly obstructing the apprehension of Francisco. Francisco was implicated in the documents seized in the prior Tondo raid.

=== Quezon Bridge arrest ===
Acting on evidence seized in the Tondo raid, the PNP-DEG conducted a hot pursuit operation against police office Rodolfo Mayo Jr.< Mayo was arrested on Quezon Bridge at 2:30 am. The police also confiscated various identification cards, a sports utility vehicle, and service firearm from Mayo.

=== Summary ===
Operation	Time	Location		Arrest	Drugs seized	
Operation	Time	Location		Arrest	Volume	Estimated worth
Tondo raid	4:45 pm (October 8, 2022)	WPD Lending Inc. office, Brgy. 252, Tondo, Manila	14°36′52.45″N 120°58′37.12″E	1	990 kilograms (2,180 lb) (Methamphetamine)	₱6.7 billion
Pasig condo raid	9 pm (October 8, 2022)	Building C, Sorrento Oasis, Rosario, Pasig	14°35′11.3″N 121°05′24.9″E	8	—N/a	
Quezon Bridge arrest	2:30 am (October 9, 2022)	Quezon Bridge, Quiapo, Manila	14°35′44.53″N 120°58′55.31″E	1	2 kilograms (4.4 lb) (Methamphetamine)	₱13.4 million

== Aftermath ==
Interior Secretary Benjamin Abalos Jr. described the series of operations as the "probably the biggest drug haul in the history of the Philippines (Note: The Tondo raid is not the biggest by amount or worth of illegal drugs seized. 1,585.25 kilograms (3,494.9 lb) (or ₱11 billion worth) of illegal drugs were seized in the March 2022 Infanta drug seizure.)". Abalos gave credit to President Bongbong Marcos, who he said directed the PNP and the Department of the Interior and Local Government (DILG) to go after the "big" hauls in relation to the war on drugs campaign.

PNP chief Rodolfo Azurin Jr. assured that the status of Mayo as an active police officer would not affect the case and touted the operation as proof that the national police body would not tolerate the involvement of its own members in crime. The PNP reportedly would file a plea before a Manila court to expedite the destruction of the seized contraband.

According to PNP-DEG director Domingo, Mayo expressed willingness to cooperate in the investigation. He reportedly has no prior derogatory record before his arrest.

Senator Ronald dela Rosa, who was a former PNP chief who once led the Philippine war on drugs under President Rodrigo Duterte, in a privilege speech lamented the return of drug syndicates under President Bongbong Marcos' administration. He also pointed out how Master Sgt. Rodolfo Mayo Jr. was able to return to Manila after Mayo was among the "ninja cops" deployed in Mindanao in 2016 due to allegedly be involved in the illegal drug trade.

The PNP's Internal Affairs Service (IAS) recommended the summary dismissal of Mayo on January 9, 2023 as a member of the PNP-DEG Special Operations Unit in the National Capital Region. The investigation also revealed that other high ranking police officers are involved in the illegal drug trade leading to Interior Secretary Abalos to call for officers to tender courtesy resignations.

=== Alleged coverup ===
In early April 2023, Interior and Local Government Secretary Benhur Abalos claimed there was a "massive cover-up" regarding the involvement of Mayo in the anti-drug operation. PNP chief Rodolfo Azurin Jr. asserts that he would not cover up Mayo.

The following are the alleged "cover-ups":

- PNP Drug Enforcement Group attempted but failed to come up with a scheme to free Mayo. Mayo was to join in the follow-up drug sting operation in Pasig.
- Two officers from the PNP-DEG Special Operations Unit 4a were captured in a CCTV footage for loading into a white car two black bags of methamphetamine

The Manila Regional Trial Court indicted 29 police personnel involved in the operation for planting of evidence and delay and bungling in the prosecution of drug cases of Comprehensive Dangerous Drugs Act of 2002 on December 10, 2024 but was publicized in early January 2025. As of January 27, 20 of them were in police custody.
