= Jesus Melchor Quitain =

Filipino lawyer

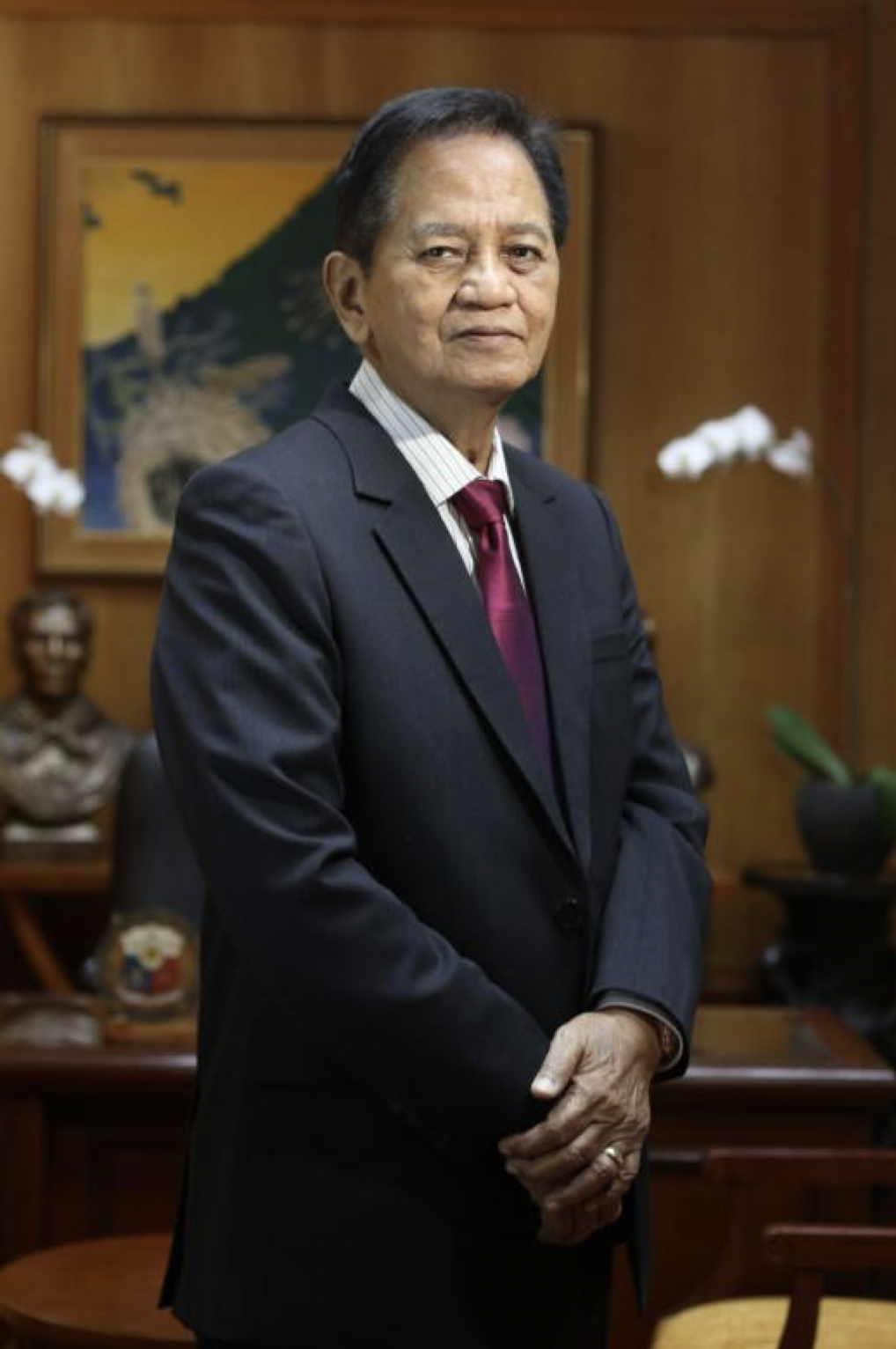

8th Chief Presidential Legal Counsel
- In office October 19, 2021 – June 30, 2022
- President: Rodrigo Duterte
- Preceded by: Salvador Panelo
- Succeeded by: Juan Ponce Enrile

Special Assistant to the President
- Officer in Charge
- In office November 9, 2018 – June 30, 2022
- President: Rodrigo Duterte
- Preceded by: Ferdinand B. Cui Jr.
- Succeeded by: Antonio Lagdameo Jr.

Head of the Presidential Management Staff
- In office November 9, 2018 – June 30, 2022
- President: Rodrigo Duterte
- Preceded by: Bong Go
- Succeeded by: Zenaida Angping

Member of the Davao City Council from the 1st district
- In office June 30, 2010 – June 30, 2016

Personal details
- Born: Jesus Melchor Vega Quitain; January 6, 1945 (age 81)
- Party: HTL (since 2012)
- Other political affiliations: Liberal (2010–2012)
- Spouse: Anita Bumpus
- Children: 2 (inc. J. Melchor Jr.)
- Education: San Beda College (LL.B)
- Profession: Lawyer

Jesus Melchor "Boy" Vega Quitain (born January 6, 1945) is a Filipino lawyer who served as Chief Presidential Legal Counsel and Special Assistant under the Duterte administration. He is also serving as an Undersecretary in the Office of the President of the Philippines from 2016 to 2022. He is reported to be the writer of most of President Rodrigo Duterte’s high-impact speeches, like his State of the Nation Addresses and inaugural speech. Quitain is among the "Davao Boys", a small circle of Duterte's trusted associates, and one of two Davao City administrators who were given key national government posts under Duterte's presidency.

== Early life and career ==
Jesus Quitain graduated from the San Beda College of Law in 1970. He is from Davao City. He joined Upsilon Sigma Phi in 1963.

Quitain engaged in private law practice since 1971. He also served in the academe as dean of the College of Law of the University of Mindanao.

He was the first National President of the Association of Resident Ombudsman in Government Agencies and Former President of the Rotary Club of South Davao.

== Public service ==
Jesus Quitain joined the government in 2001 when then Davao City Mayor Rodrigo Duterte appointed him as City Legal Officer.

He also served in Davao City as Councilor of the First District, and as City Administrator. He was also the Former Resident Ombudsman of Davao City, for which he was awarded as Outstanding Resident Ombudsman of the Philippines for 2008.

Prior to his latest appointment as Chief Presidential Legal Counsel in 2021, Quitain served as the officer in charge of the Office of the Special Assistant to the President.

== Personal life ==
Quitain is the father of Jesus Melchor Quitain Jr. ("Jay", born 1972), incumbent first district councilor and former vice mayor of Davao City, and Grace Quitain Pecson; he is also the grandfather of Richard Quitain Pecson.

Legal offices
Preceded by Salvador Panelo	Chief Presidential Legal Counsel; 2021–2022	Succeeded by Juan Ponce Enrile
Political offices
Preceded by Ferdinand B. Cui Jr. as Officer in Charge	Special Assistant to the President; Officer in Charge; 2018–2022	Succeeded by Antonio Lagdameo Jr. as Special Assistant to the President
Preceded by Bong Go as Special Assistant to the President and Head of the Presidential Management Staff	Head of the Presidential Management Staff; 2018–2022	Succeeded by Zenaida Angping
