= Edilberto Leonardo =

Police officer and government official in the Philippines

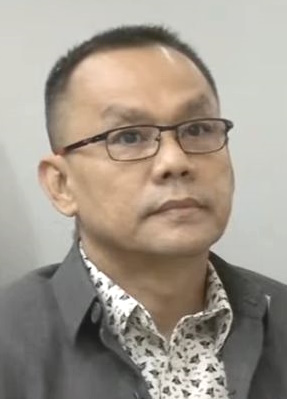
- Leonardo in 2024
- Born: Edilberto Dela Cruz Leonardo
- Police career
- Service: Philippine National Police
- Division: Criminal Investigation and Detection Group
- Service years: Until 2020
- Rank: Police Colonel

Edilberto Dela Cruz Leonardo is a retired Filipino police officer and government official.

== Education ==
Leonardo attended the Rizal Memorial Colleges in Davao City where he obtained a master's degree in educational management in 2009; as well as the University of Makati where he got his executive doctorate in leadership-public management in 2019.

== Career ==
=== Police career ===
Leonardo was an officer for the Philippine National Police. He was noted for being part of the Criminal Investigation and Detection Group (CIDG).

He graduated from the PNP Academy in 1998.

In May 2016, Leonardo was tasked by then president-elect Rodrigo Duterte to implement the "Davao model" in a nationwide scale as alleged by underclassman Royina Garma who endorsed him for the role. As per Garma, Leonardo was endorsed since he fit Duterte's specification of a person who is a PNP officer or an Iglesia ni Cristo member. This led to the implementation of the police-led Philippine drug war.

In 2017, Leonardo was stationed as commander of the Manila Police District's (MPD) Moriones police station. In the same year, Leonardo would be tagged as one of the suspects in the International Criminal Court's (ICC) investigation on Duterte's war on drugs campaign.

His last role in the PNP was being chief of the CIDG for the Davao region, retiring from police duty on September 29, 2020.

=== DENR ===
Leonardo worked in the Department of Environment and Natural Resources (DENR) as the body's undersecretary for protected areas and special concerns. He concurrently was the executive director of Anti-Illegal Logging Task Force of the DENR. He was also director of the Biodiversity Management Bureau until 2021.

=== Napolcom ===
On February 14, 2022, Leonardo was appointed by president Rodrigo Duterte as commissioner for the National Police Commission (Napolcom)

During the administration of president Bongbong Marcos, the House of Representatives quad committee had him as a guest in its inquiries in September 2024. During the hearings he was alleged to play a part in the 2016 Davao prison killings and the killing of PCSO board secretary Wesley Barayuga in 2020. He resigned on October 4, 2024.

== Personal life ==
Leonardo is a member of the Iglesia ni Cristo.
