= Special Assistant to the President (Philippines) =

Official aide to the President of the Philippines

- Office seal

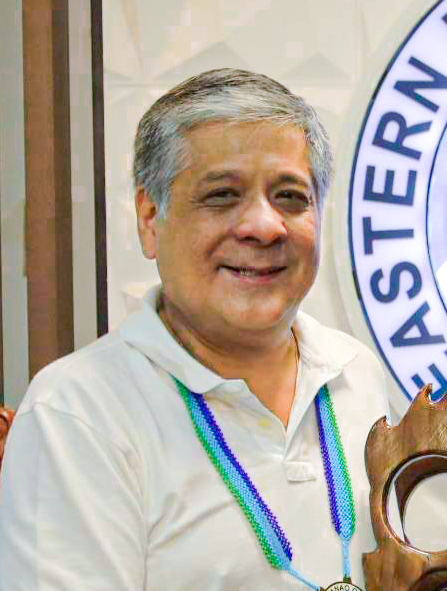
- Incumbent; Antonio Lagdameo Jr. since June 30, 2022
- Abbreviation: SAP
- Member of: Cabinet
- Reports to: President of the Philippines
- Appointer: President of the Philippines
- Constituting instrument: Executive Order No. 1
- Formation: June 30, 2016

The special assistant to the president (SAP) is the official aide of the president of the Philippines. The holder of the position leads the Office of the Special Assistant to the President (OSAP). The SAP provides general supervision to the Presidential Management Staff.

== History ==
=== Duterte administration ===
President Rodrigo Duterte appointed Christopher "Bong" Go, a close personal aide of his prior to his presidency, as the Special Assistant to the President (SAP) upon assuming office as the chief executive of the Philippines in 2016. Duterte issued Executive Order No. 1 tasking the SAP to oversee the Office of the Special Assistant to the President (OSAP) as well as the Office of the Appointments Secretary, and the Presidential Management Staff. Go would resign from his post two years later on October 15, 2018, to pursue a bid to be elected as senator in the 2019 elections, although he remained at duty of his functions as SAP in an unofficial capacity until his replacement was officially declared by President Rodrigo Duterte himself.

On November 9, 2018, Jesus Melchor Quitain took over the Office of the Special Assistant to the President (OSAP) as its Officer in Charge.

=== Marcos Jr. administration ===
President Bongbong Marcos appointed Antonio Lagdameo Jr., a known business associate of Marcos as the Special Assistant to the President (SAP) upon assuming the presidency in 2022. Lagdameo was also the largest individual donor to the Marcos' 2022 presidential campaign, contributing more than ₱240 million to the campaign.

== Officeholders ==
No.	Image	Name	Term of office	President
1.		Bong Go	June 30, 2016 – October 15, 2018	Rodrigo Duterte
*		Ferdinand B. Cui Jr. (OIC)	October 15, 2018 – November 9, 2018	Rodrigo Duterte
*		Jesus Melchor Quitain (OIC)	November 9, 2018 – June 30, 2022	Rodrigo Duterte
2.		Antonio Lagdameo Jr.	June 30, 2022 – Present	Bongbong Marcos
