= 2016 Davao prison killings =

- Date: August 13, 2016
- Venue: Davao Prison and Penal Farm
- Location: Panabo, Davao del Norte
- Type: Homicide
- Motive: Drug deal disagreement or promise of liberty and monetary reward
- Target: Chinese inmates alleged to be drug lords
- Perpetrators: Fernando Magdadaro; Leopoldo Tan Jr.
- Outcome: Deaths of Chu Kin Tung, Li Lan Yan, and Wong Mien Pin
- Verdict: Guilty
- Convictions: Homicide (both Magdadaro and Tan)

On August 13, 2016, three Chinese nationals detained at the Davao Prison and Penal Farm in Panabo, Davao del Norte were stabbed to death by two Filipino inmates.

Initially reported to be an altercation over a drug deal among inmates at the time, the incident was later the subject of Congressional inquiry in 2024 where allegations that the police have sanctioned the killings.

== Killings ==
On August 13, 2016, three Chinese nationals were stabbed to death by two Filipino inmates at the Disciplinary Dormitory or bartolina of Davao Prison and Penal Farm (DPPF) in Panabo, Davao del Norte.

The altercation was initially reported to be due to a previous drug deal inside the prison.

The perpetrators are Fernando Magdadaro and Leopoldo Tan Jr. who are convicts. Magdadaro is convicted of murder and illegal possession of firearms Tan was sentenced for violations of the Comprehensive Dangerous Drugs Act of 2002.

Gerardo Padilla was the warden of the DPFF at the time.

Magdadaro and Tan were convicted of homicide for the killings after pleading guilty.

== Victims ==
Chu Kin Tung (alias Tony Lim; aged 46)

Tung was a transferee from the New Bilibid Prison in Muntinlupa

Li Lan Yan (alias Jackson Li; aged 54)

Li was a transferee from the New Bilibid Prison (NBP) in Muntinlupa. He had a reputation of being one of the "biggest drug lords" in the Philippines. Accused of operating a methamphetamine business, Li was first arrested in 2003. The Ozamis robbery-holdup gang helped him escape from detention in February 2013 while he was enroute to a court hearing. He was rearrested in July of the same year. He reportedly was still able to continue illegal drug trade operations from within the NBP. Li was transferred to the Davao Prison and Penal Farm during the time of Justice Secretary Leila de Lima in a bid to curb the drug trade within the NBP.

Wong Mien Pin (alias Wang Ming Ping; aged 53)

Pin was a transferee from the Cebu City Jail

== 2024 Congressional inquiry ==
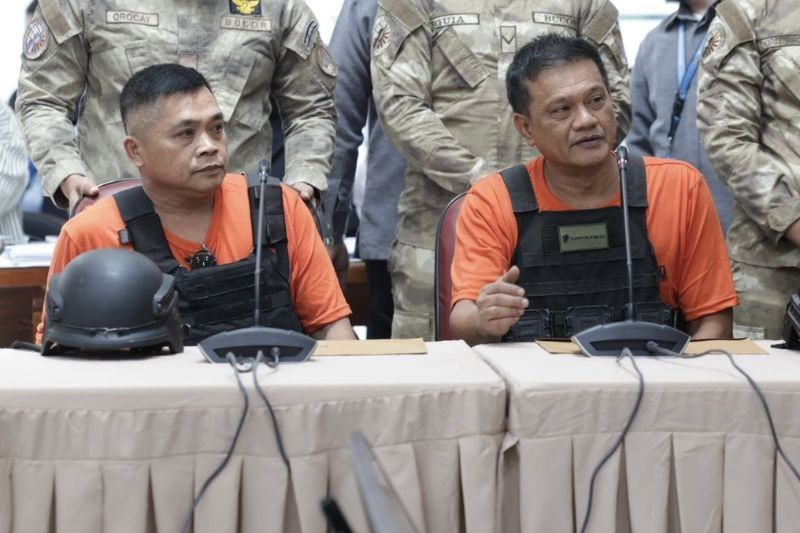
Fernando Magdadaro and Leopoldo Tan during the Quad Committee hearing on August 22, 2024.

A quad committee was formed by the House of Representatives to investigate Philippine Offshore Gaming Operators, extrajudicial killings and the Philippine drug war in August 2024.

On August 22, 2024, the Fernando Magdadaro and Leopoldo Tan Jr. in the quad committee inquiries alleged that they were promised and promised liberty for killing the three Chinese inmates back in 2016. They alleged that SPO4 Arthur Narsolis convinced them to kill the three in exchange of talking to President Rodrigo Duterte for their release if they are successful. They noted that the three Chinese inmates are detained in a separate cell than Magddaro and Tan.

On August 11, 2016, a search was conducted on the two's cell where authorities found the two in possession of meth which would be allegedly used as a pretext to move them to a same cell as the three Chinese. Two days later the killing would occur. The promise of liberty to the Magdadaro and Tan were left unfilled as Duterte's presidential term expired in 2022.

Tan said he allegedly overhead a phone call of DPPF Officer in Charge Gerardo Padilla being congratulated by President Rodrigo Duterte for the killing. Padilla affirmed Tan's testimony of the call having taken place.

Police official Royina Garma was implicated in the killings. Padilla initially denied prior interactions with her but recanted the statement. He alleged Garma pressured him not to intervene in a plot against the Chinese inmates via the phone of former policeman and inmate Jimmy Fortaleza. Garma denies the allegation, insinuating Padilla is attempting to absolve himself of accountability and Fortaleza due to resentment of her not pushing for a presidential pardon for him.

Rodrigo Duterte's former presidential spokesperson Harry Roque dismissed the claims as hearsay while his legal counsel Salvador Panelo labeled the hearing as a demolition job against former President Duterte.
