= Cebu City Police Office =

PNP's police command in the City of Cebu

Philippine National Police Cebu City Police Office
- Abbreviation: CCPO

Jurisdictional structure
- Operations jurisdiction: Cebu City, Region VII, PH
- Map of Cebu City, the PNP CCPO's jurisdiction
- General nature: Local civilian police

Operational structure
- Headquarters: Camp Sotero Cabahug, Gorordo Avenue, Kamputhaw, Cebu City
- Agency executive: Police Colonel George V. Ylanan, City Director
- Parent agency: Philippine National Police

Facilities
- Police Stations: 11 stations: 1 - Parian; 2 - Osmeña Boulevard; 3 - Waterfront Pier; 4 - Mabolo; 5 - Carbon Market; 6 - Sawang Calero; 7 - Poblacion Pardo; 8 - Talamban; 9 - Guadalupe; 10 - Punta Princesa; 11 - Mambaling

Website
- Official website

The Cebu City Police Office (CCPO) is a division of the Philippine National Police (PNP) which has jurisdiction over Cebu City and is under Police Regional Office VII (Central Visayas). It is headquartered in Camp Sotero Cabahug.

As of July 9, 2026, the current CCPO Chief Director is Police Colonel Ricky C. Sumalde.

== Stations ==
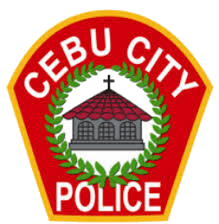
Former logo as the PNP Cebu City Police Office.

The CCPO currently oversees 13 police stations, namely:

- Station 1: Parian Police Station (Sikatuna St)
- Station 2: Abellana Police Station (Osmeña Blvd)
- Station 3: Waterfront Pier Police Station (Pier 1 area)
- Station 4: Mabolo Police Station
- Station 5: Carbon Police Station (M.C. Briones St)
- Station 6: Pasil / Sawang Calero Police Station (Spolarium St)
- Station 7: Inayawan Police Station (I. Tabura St)
- Station 8: Talamban Police Station (Talamban Rd)
- Station 9: Guadalupe Police Station (V. Rama Ave)
- Station 10: Labangon / Punta Princesa Police Station (Tres de Abril St)
- Station 11: Mambaling Police Station (Maria Gochan St)
- Station 12: Malubog Police Station (Langub-Sirao Rd)
- Station 13: Adlaon Police Station (Sitio Kang-atis)

== List of City Directors ==
Note: Term does not distinguish the date of appointment as officer in charge and formal designation as city director.

Name	Term	Ref.
Cecil Ezra Sandalo	? – April 2004	
Melvin Gayotin	April 2004 – January 2007	
Patrocinio Comendador Jr.	January 2007 – August 2012	
Melvin Ramon Buenafe	August 2012 – December 27, 2012	
Mariano Natuel Jr.	December 27, 2012 – July 30, 2013	
Noli Romana	July 30, 2013 – December 6, 2014	
Conrad Capa	December 6, 2014 – March 16, 2015	
Marciano Batiancela Jr.	March 16, 2015 – January 9, 2016	
Benjamin Santos Jr.	January 9, 2016 – July 13, 2016	
Joel Doria	July 13, 2016 – July 1, 2018	
Royina Garma	July 1, 2018 – July 11, 2019	
Gemma Vinluan	July 11, 2019 – October 30, 2019	
Giovanie Maines	October 30, 2019 – December 27, 2019	
Engelbert Soriano	December 27, 2019 – March 20, 2020	
Hector Grijaldo	March 20, 2020 – April 9, 2020	
Josefino Ligan	April 9, 2020 – January 11, 2022	
Ernesto Tagle	January 11, 2022 – October 1, 2022	
Ireneo Dalogdog	October 1, 2022 – July 26, 2024	
Antonietto Y. Cañete	July 26, 2024 – January 13, 2025	
Enrico Evangelista Figueroa	January 13, 2025 – November 12, 2025	
George V. Ylanan	November 12, 2025 – present	
