= Killing of Wesley Barayuga =

2020 shooting in Manila, Philippines

- Part of the Philippine drug war
- Location: 14°34′46.4″N 121°02′58.5″E; Mandaluyong, Metro Manila, Philippines
- Date: July 30, 2020; 3:30pm (UTC+8)
- Target: Wesley Barayuga
- Attack type: Assassination by shooting
- Weapon: .45 caliber pistol
- Deaths: Wesley Barayuga
- Injuries: Barayuga's driver
- Assailants: Alias "Toks" and "Loloy"
- Motive: Under investigation
- Inquiry: September–October 2024 House of Representatives Quad Committee

Philippine Charity Sweepstakes Office board secretary Wesley Barayuga was killed by an unidentified gunman on July 30, 2020, in Mandaluyong, Metro Manila, Philippines. Barayuga was initially speculated to have been killed due to work-related issues. He was also without evidence, accused of being part of a 'narcolist' created for President Rodrigo Duterte's Philippine drug war.

Despite Barayuga's profile as a high-ranking government official and a former police officer, his killing remained a cold case for four years until police officer Santie Mendoza implicated National Police Commission commissioner Edilberto Leonardo and then PCSO general manager Royina Garma of masterminding the killings during a House of Representatives inquiry in September 2024, two years into the presidency of Duterte's successor Bongbong Marcos.

== Background ==
Wesley Barayuga was a former police officer who held the rank of police brigadier general. He graduated in the Philippine Military Academy (PMA) in 1983 as part of Matikas class which included Eduardo Año, who was then serving as the Secretary of the Interior and Local Government at the time of his death. He is a graduate of University of San Agustin in Iloilo City where he obtained a law degree in 1996. From 2006 to 2008, he was Iloilo City Police Office director. A native of Nueva Ecija, Barayuga had his family settle in Iloilo City. On October 31, 2014, he retired from the PNP with his last position being Directorate of Logistics chief at Camp Crame, Quezon City.

At the time of his death, Barayuga is the board secretary of the Philippine Charity Sweepstakes Office (PCSO) which was then led by general manager and former police official Royina Garma. He has been with the PCSO since January 24, 2018. He is credited for cleansing the roster of small-town lottery operators (STLs) which superseded illegal jueteng operators in Central Luzon and masiao in the Visayas

Barayuga often used public transportation prior to the onset of the COVID-19 pandemic. He was shot dead in July 2020, while he was being driven in a Mitsubishi Strada provided for by the PCSO. He died at age 62.

== Killing ==
Wesley Barayuga was riding a Mitsubishi Strada back to his residence when he and his driver were shot by one of two masked gunmen riding separate motorcycles. They were at the corner of Calbayog and Malinaw Streets at around 3:30pm (UTC+8) in Mandaluyong.

Barayuga died on the spot while his driver was rushed to the VRP Medical Center after sustaining injuries.

The driver of a brown Honda City who stopped their vehicle in front of Barayuga's victim was also tagged as a suspect after their failure to file a report despite the victims' pick-up crashing into their vehicle aroused suspicion from the authorities.

== Immediate reactions ==
=== PCSO ===
PCSO general manager Royina Garma released a statement condemning the attack and offering condolences to the Barayuga family. She said that the agency's Security Office is coordinating with the police regarding the incident.

=== Linkage to the illegal drug trade ===
In the context of the Philippine drug war of President Rodrigo Duterte, National Capital Region Police Office chief Debold Sinas said that Barayuga might be part of Duterte's 'narcolist', a list of people allegedly involved in the illegal drug trade. He did not provide evidence that the PCSO official was part of such list.

Barayuga's niece denied the allegations pointing out that her uncle is a key witness on investigations on the alleged anomalies within the PCSO at the time. The PMA batch 1983 attested to Barayuga's character was never involved in drugs.

== Initial investigation ==
The Mandaluyong City Police, National Bureau of Investigation (NBI), and the Criminal Investigation and Detection Group (CIDG) launched an investigation on the killing. The police were able to recover surveillance videos of the incident to help ascertain the possible perpetrators of the killing. The consensus at the time is that the shooting is a work of a professional with a gambling operator denied permits speculated to be the mastermind of Barayuga's killing. The Eastern Police District (EPD) has activated a special investigation task group (SITG) in August 2020 in relation to the case.

His batchmates in the PMA in October 2020 released a bounty of ₱1 million for information that would lead to the arrest of the suspects of Barayuga's case. The incident has been a cold case with no leads to the case identified.

== Reopening of case in 2024 ==
=== Congressional inquiry ===
At a hearing by the House of Representatives in the latter half of 2024, police officer Santie Mendoza alleged that National Police Commission commissioner Edilberto Leonardo, then a police colonel at the time and PCSO general manager Royina Garma were the masterminds of the killing.

According to Mendoza's testimony in the lower house's Quad Committee, Leonardo first contacted him in October 2019 on the prospect of eliminating a "high-value target", or a high-profile individual involved in the illegal drug trade. In February 2020, Leonardo identified the target as Barayuga. Mendoza insists he was hesitant to carry out the plan but was convinced after Leonardo said the operation is supported by PCSO head Garma.

The operation was delayed by the community quarantines measures imposed for the COVID-19 pandemic. Mendoza contacted fellow police officer Nelson Mariano to carry out the task who reached out to a hitman known under the alias Toks. Toks and Mariano was allegedly given monetary incentives by Garma after Barayuga's successful assassination.

Both Garma and Leonardo denied the allegations. On October 12, 2024, Leonardo resigned from the National Police Commission, citing the investigations against him. In November 2024, Garma fled to the United States and filed for asylum. However, this was denied and she returned to the Philippines in September 2025.

On November 13, 2024, Rodrigo Duterte denied having any knowledge or involvement over Barayuga's murder during a congressional hearing.

=== Reinvestigation and filing of charges ===
On September 29, 2024, Philippine National Police chief Rommel Marbil ordered the immediate reopening the investigation on the Barayuga case in light of new allegations that its personnel were allegedly involved in the killing. The CIDG has issued subpoenas to undisclosed people in relation to the case.

Barayuga's widow and driver plans to file murder charges against personalities linked to his killing at the 2024 Quad Committee hearings.

On February 3, 2025, the PNP and the NBI filed charges of murder and frustrated murder against Garma, Leonardo and three other police officials over Barayuga's killing. On September 29, a court in Mandaluyong issued arrest warrants against Garma and four others over Barayuga's murder. Two of the suspects surrendered by September 30, while Garma, who is involved in a case at the International Criminal Court against former president Rodrigo Duterte, was in Malaysia for a meeting with the ICC.
