= March 2022 Infanta drug seizure =

Drug raid in the Philippines

- Part of Philippine drug war
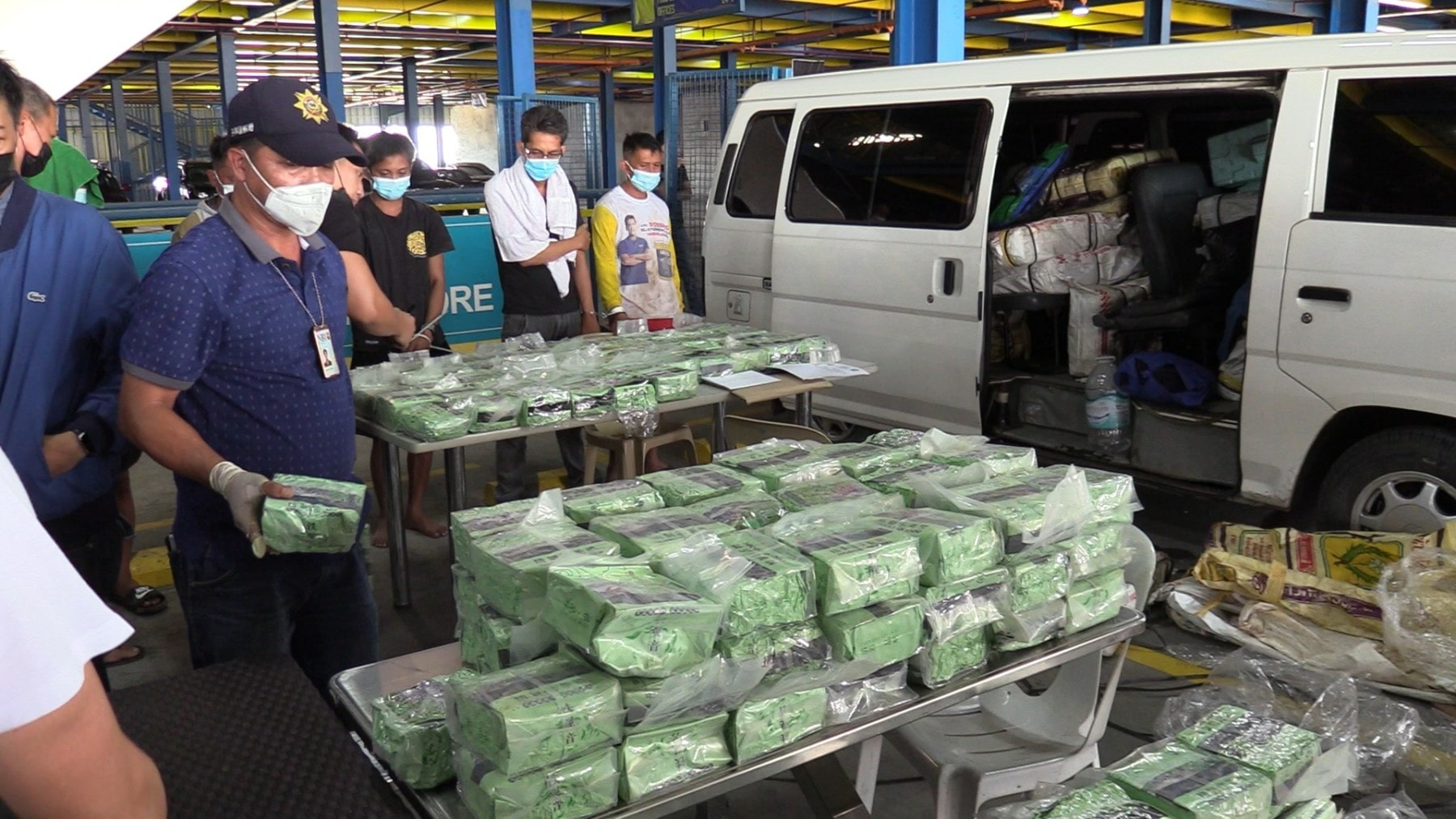
- Portion of the confiscated drugs from the Infanta drug seizure
- Date: March 15, 2022
- Time: c. 4 am (PHT)
- Location: National Highway, Brgy. Comon, Infanta, Quezon, Philippines; 14°44′27.02″N 121°38′42.54″E
- Type: Anti-drug law enforcement operation
- Participants: National Bureau of Investigation: Task Force Against Illegal Drugs; Research and Analysis Division; Lucena District Office; Philippine National Police–Infanta; Philippine Drug Enforcement Agency (PDEA)–Lucena
- Arrests: 10
- Accused: 10
- Amount of drugs seized: 1,585.25 kilograms (3,494.9 lb)
- Worth of drugs seized: ₱11 billion

On March 15, 2022, law enforcement agents intercepted three vans in Brgy. Comon, Infanta, Quezon, Philippines, seized ₱11 billion worth of illegal drugs. The operation was described as the "biggest drug haul in Philippine history".

== Operation ==
The National Bureau of Investigation's (NBI) Task Force Against Illegal Drugs (TFAID) and Research and Analysis Division, the Lucena District Office, along with the Philippine National Police-Infanta and Philippine Drug Enforcement Agency (PDEA)-Lucena conducted a seizure of methamphetamine hydrochloride, an illegal drug in the Philippines, on March 15, 2022 in Brgy. Comon, Infanta in Quezon province.

At a checkpoint setup along the National Highway at around 4am, the combined law enforcement operatives intercepted three white Nissan Urban vans. Ten individuals were arrested.

An informant from the PDEA provided leads to the NBI-TFAID which made the drug operation possible.

The NBI received a tip, that a shipment of illegal drugs would arrive in the Philippines in the shores of Quezon province and would be received by land-based transporters. The contraband reportedly were retrieved from waters between Polillo and Balesin islands.

== Drugs seized ==
The drugs retrieved are methamphetamine hydrochloride. They were placed inside 1,589 teabags which in turn were concealed inside 80 sacks. The drugs weigh 1,585.25 kilograms (3,494.9 lb) in total, and are estimate to worth around ₱11 billion. The seized contrabands would undergo inventory and marking at the Taytay Tiangge Building in Taytay, Rizal with the presence of Brgy. Comon officials and Infanta, Quezon media representatives.

The seizure would be tagged as the "biggest drug haul in Philippine history" by the NBI.

== Suspects ==
Ten suspects were arrested on the spot as a result of the operation. The Department of Justice (DOJ) approved the filing of cases against all of the detained for violation of the Comprehensive Dangerous Drugs Act of 2002 (Republic Act No. 9165). They were detained at the NBI center in Manila.

The NBI has categorically deny linking any public officials of Quezon province to the drug seizure responding to circulating unverified information through social media.

== Honors ==
President Rodrigo Duterte conferred the Order of Lapu-Lapu to the National Bureau of Investigation which at the time was led by Officer in Charge Eric Distor.
