= Antonio Lagdameo Jr. =

Filipino politician and businessman (born 1968)

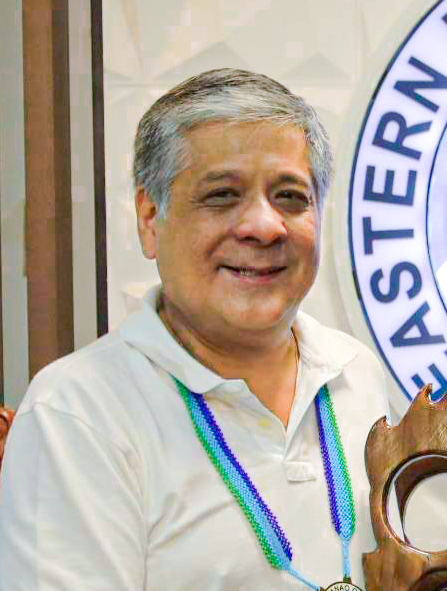
- Lagdameo in 2025

2nd Special Assistant to the President of the Philippines
- Incumbent
- Assumed office June 30, 2022
- President: Bongbong Marcos
- Preceded by: Jesus Melchor Quitain (OIC)

Member of the House of Representatives from Davao del Norte's 2nd district
- In office June 30, 2007 – June 30, 2016
- Preceded by: Antonio Floirendo Jr.
- Succeeded by: Antonio Floirendo Jr.

Personal details
- Born: Antonio Ernesto Floirendo Lagdameo Jr. January 22, 1968 (age 58) Tagum, Davao del Norte, Philippines
- Party: PFP (2018–present)
- Other political affiliations: NUP (2011–2018); Lakas (2006–2011)
- Spouse: Dawn Zulueta (m. 1997)
- Relations: JM Lagdameo (brother)
- Children: Jacobo Antonio and Ayisha Madlen
- Education: University of Pennsylvania (B.S); University of Asia and the Pacific (M.S.)
- Occupation: Politician
- Website: Official website

Antonio Ernesto "Anton" Floirendo Lagdameo Jr. (born January 22, 1968) is a Filipino politician and businessman serving as the Special Assistant to the President since June 2022 in President Bongbong Marcos' administration. He was the Representative of Davao del Norte's 2nd district from 2007 to 2016. He is the son of the former Philippine Permanent Representative to the United Nations Antonio Manuel Lagdameo, is a member of the wealthy Floirendo clan in Southern Mindanao, and is married to actress Dawn Zulueta.

As a public servant, Lagdameo's main focus was on rural and agricultural development, social conservatism, education and lifelong learning, tourism and sustainable development. He is the largest individual donor to the 2022 presidential campaign of Bongbong Marcos, contributing more than ₱240 million to the campaign.

== Early life and education ==
Lagdameo was born on January 22, 1968, in the then-municipality of Tagum, Davao del Norte to Antonio Manuel Lagdameo and Linda Floirendo. He is a grandson of "banana king" Antonio Floirendo Sr., one of Ferdinand Marcos' cronies.

Being innately drawn to business, economics and trade, Lagdameo finished his Bachelor of Business Administration from the University of Pennsylvania in 1989. In 2016, he was included in the prestigious Penn Notables list, a roster of alumni, faculty and trustees of the University of Pennsylvania who served outstandingly in foreign government. He continued his education in 1998 at the University of Asia and the Pacific, earning a master's degree in Business Economics.

== Business career ==
Prior to his entry to politics as representative of the second district of Davao del Norte, he was a successful businessman. He was a credit analyst for Manufacturers Hanover Trust in Manhattan, New York from 1989 to 1992 and after that, of National Westminster Bank in New York for a year. He then became Director of Cambrick Trading Ltd. in London from 1993 to 1996. He returned to the Philippines and served as the Vice President of Anflo Management & Investment Corp. in Davao from 1996 until 2007.

== Political career ==
Lagdameo was also a member of the Commission on Appointments, an independent body separate and distinct from the Legislature, though composed of members of Congress that acts as a restraint against the abuse of the appointing power of the President by approving only those who are fit and qualified to ensure the efficient and harmonious functioning of the government.

He is the current Special Assistant of President Bongbong Marcos.

== Personal life ==
Lagdameo is married to actress Dawn Zulueta, with whom he has two children, Jacobo Antonio and Ayisha Madlen.

House of Representatives of the Philippines
Preceded by Antonio R. Floirendo Jr.	Representative, 2nd District of Davao del Norte; 2007–2016	Succeeded by Antonio R. Floirendo Jr.
Political offices
Preceded by Jesus Melchor Quitain as Officer in Charge	Special Assistant to the President of the Philippines; 2022–present	Incumbent
