= Presidential Management Staff =

Philippine government agency

- Pampanguluhang Lupon sa Pamamahala
- Seal since 2017

Agency overview
- Formed: July 29, 1970
- Headquarters: 10/F, PMS Bldg., Arlegui St., San Miguel, Manila
- Employees: 268 (2024)
- Annual budget: ₱224.347 million (2009)
- Agency executive: Elaine Masukat, Secretary and Head
- Website: www.pms.gov.ph

The Presidential Management Staff (PMS; Filipino: Pampanguluhang Lupon sa Pamamahala) is a Philippine government agency attached to the Office of the President that is tasked to manage the development and formulation of the projects and policies of the Office of the President. Though the PMS is headed by a Secretary, the Secretaries of the Cabinet, Chief of Staff, and Appointments support the agency. The PMS, the Office of the Appointments Secretary and the Events Management Cluster are under the supervision of the Special Assistant to the President.

The position is currently held by Elaine Masukat, after the resignation of Zenaida Angping on December 2, 2022.

== History ==
The Presidential Management Staff traces its origins to the Program Implementation Agency (PIA), established by President Diosdado Macapagal to serve as his technical staff for the socio-economic projects of his administration. The PIA was created on August 24, 1962, under the leadership of Assistant Executive Secretary Sixto K. Roxas and Armand Fabella, who was appointed Director-General.

The PIA reported directly to the President and conducted socio-economic planning, formulate policy recommendations, established priorities, and programmed the utilization of public funds, manpower resources, materials and equipment. It also ensured that the projects of the Office of the President were completed on-time as planned.

On February 1, 1966, President Ferdinand E. Marcos dissolved the PIA and established the Presidential Economic Staff (PES) in its place through Executive Order No. 8. The PES retained all the functions of the PIA and in addition, it was tasked to establish ties with international financial institutions to help the government and the private sector tap foreign credit and assistance. The PES was headed by Placido Mapa and Apolinario Orosa and translated the economic targets of the National Economic Council into actual projects.

On July 29, 1970, President Marcos then issued Executive Order No. 250, which created the Development Management Staff (DMS) under the Office of the President. The DMS was located at the Arlegui Guest House.

In 1972, Internal Reorganization Plan was implemented and the PES was absorbed by the National Economic and Development Authority and the DMS was retained as an attached agency of the Office of the President, serving as the principal information and staff resource of Malacañang on matters involving monitoring, coordinating, and controlling development programs at execution. Executive Secretary Alejandro Melchor was appointed to run the DMS; he then proceeded to hire 50 young men and women, including Colonel Luis M. Mirasol, whom he would appoint as managing director.

The DMS held office at the New Executive Office Building (San Miguel Building) and produced regular status reports for 21 priority programs as well as provided staff to various government programs and agencies. The priority programs included projects related to land reform, housing, education, and rural electrification. These status reports would then be used for briefings as well as Cabinet meetings.

On July 8, 1976, Presidential Decree No. 955 reorganized the Office of the President, renaming the DMS as the Presidential Management Staff.

On June 30, 2022, President Bongbong Marcos placed the Presidential Broadcast Staff - Radio Television Malacañang which was previously attached to the Presidential Communications Group under the direct supervision and control of the PMS. Also, the chief of the Presidential Management Staff took over all powers and functions of the Cabinet Secretary after the Office of the Cabinet Secretary was abolished by virtue of Executive Order No. 1, s. 2022.

== Mandate ==
The Presidential Management Staff (PMS) shall be the primary government agency directly responsible to the Office of the President for providing staff assistance in the Presidential exercise of overall management of the development process.

== Powers and functions ==
To accomplish its mandate, the PMS shall have the following powers and functions pursuant to Executive Order No. 130, s. 1987:

(a) Provide technical assistance and advice directly to the President in exercising overall management of the development process;

(b) Analyze and monitor national programs and projects;

(c) Formulate and implement development management information systems and programs that will include upgrading and strengthening the Office of the President in terms of computer and communications technology for more effective information management and decision management support;

(d) Conduct continuing analysis and evaluation of economic, social and political trends;

(e) Conduct studies on methods for the effective and efficient execution of development programs and projects;

(f) Conduct, review, analysis and evaluation of proposed and existing policies affecting development;

(g) Provide centralized feedback mechanism on the implementation of national government projects;

(h) Identify bottlenecks in project implementation or problem areas and possible sources of delays, and formulate solutions or corrective measures thereto;

(i) Translate Presidential perspective/insights, policies and plans on development issues into strategic action programs/projects;

(j) Assist in the coordination function for the President with respect to the implementation of the various development programs of the Government;

(k) Implement initial action on critical areas such as, but not limited to, the National Reconciliation and Development Program, where the President wishes to lead in piloting development initiatives that can subsequently be turned over and directly managed by the line ministries;

(l) Provide a direct feedback mechanism to and from the people and the Office of the President;

(m) Exercise direct control and supervision over such organizations, offices, agencies, programs and projects as may be aligned/assigned/transferred to the Office pursuant to the provisions of Administrative Orders Nos. 9 and 10 (January 5, 1987), or as provided in existing or subsequent promulgations, orders and instructions of the President;

(n) Organize and supervise such task forces as may be necessary to respond to instructions from the President;

(o) Formulate, implement, and supervise the government’s policies, plans and programs pertaining to the technical support and development management requirements of the President, in accordance with Presidential directives and administrative orders;

(p Exercise management supervision and control over all bureaus, agencies, corporations, centers, councils, committees placed under the control of the former Office of Development Management and such other agencies placed under its supervision and control by the Office of the President;

(q) Establish policies and implement programs for the efficient management and operations of its Office and undertake research and such other management measures of efficiency and economy that will redound to the benefit of the Office and the achievement of its development management objectives;

(r) Exercise such other functions and powers as may be provided by law.

== Structure ==
The head of the PMS, holding the rank of secretary, has direct control and supervision over the organization's operations and resources. Supporting the PMS head is a deputy, who holds the rank of undersecretary. The management team (MANTEAM), consisting of all PMS officials and unit heads, provides a forum to enhance the involvement and participation of key officials in managing the organization's affairs. The PMS has four functional operations units, which provide technical inputs to the president and the Office of the President. These units are structurally and functionally created by the sector to address presidential concerns and to ensure efficient coordination among concerned departments/agencies/bodies. These units are as follows:

- Development Management Staff Office (DMSO)
- Office for Regional Concerns (ORC)
- Office for the Facilitation of Presidential Assistance (OFPA)
- ORC Field Units (ORC-FUs)

They are tasked to monitor issues and developments focusing specifically on those that shall impact on the Presidency and national interest, translate Presidential insights/perspectives into operational terms, provide alternative opinions/recommendations on policy and program issues, and conduct policy reviews within their sectoral jurisdiction. A Speechwriting Group answers the speech requirement of the President. PMS also has support units which assist other PMS Units and PMS programs and projects in the performance of their tasks – Administrative and Management Office (ADMO), Conference Management Office (CMO), Editorial and Visual Design Office (EVIO), Legal Office (LO), and Information Technology Office (ITO). All the PMS units operate with the benefits of computer technology. PMS ensures that it keeps abreast with the fast-changing trends in IT to provide an even better, more responsive staff work for the Presidency. General Manpower Attributes PMS Has a multi-disciplinary staff that enables it to be more responsive to the various tasks it handles. About 60% of its staff performs managerial, supervising or technical functions. By academic discipline, the officials and employees of PMS are graduates of some of the finest schools and educational institutions here and abroad. About 65% are graduates of the following fields of specialization, either masteral or bachelor's degree level: public/business administration; economics; behavioral and social sciences; engineering; computer education; accounting; agriculture-related courses; law; education; and organizational/mass communication. The PMS is composed of relatively young employees. Close to 70% are between 20 and 40 years old.

== Development Performance Evaluation System ==
The Development Performance Evaluation System is tasked by the President to conduct audits of the Executive Departments. It aims to pinpoint problems and subsequently recommending solutions to align the different departments towards development objectives.

== Gallery ==
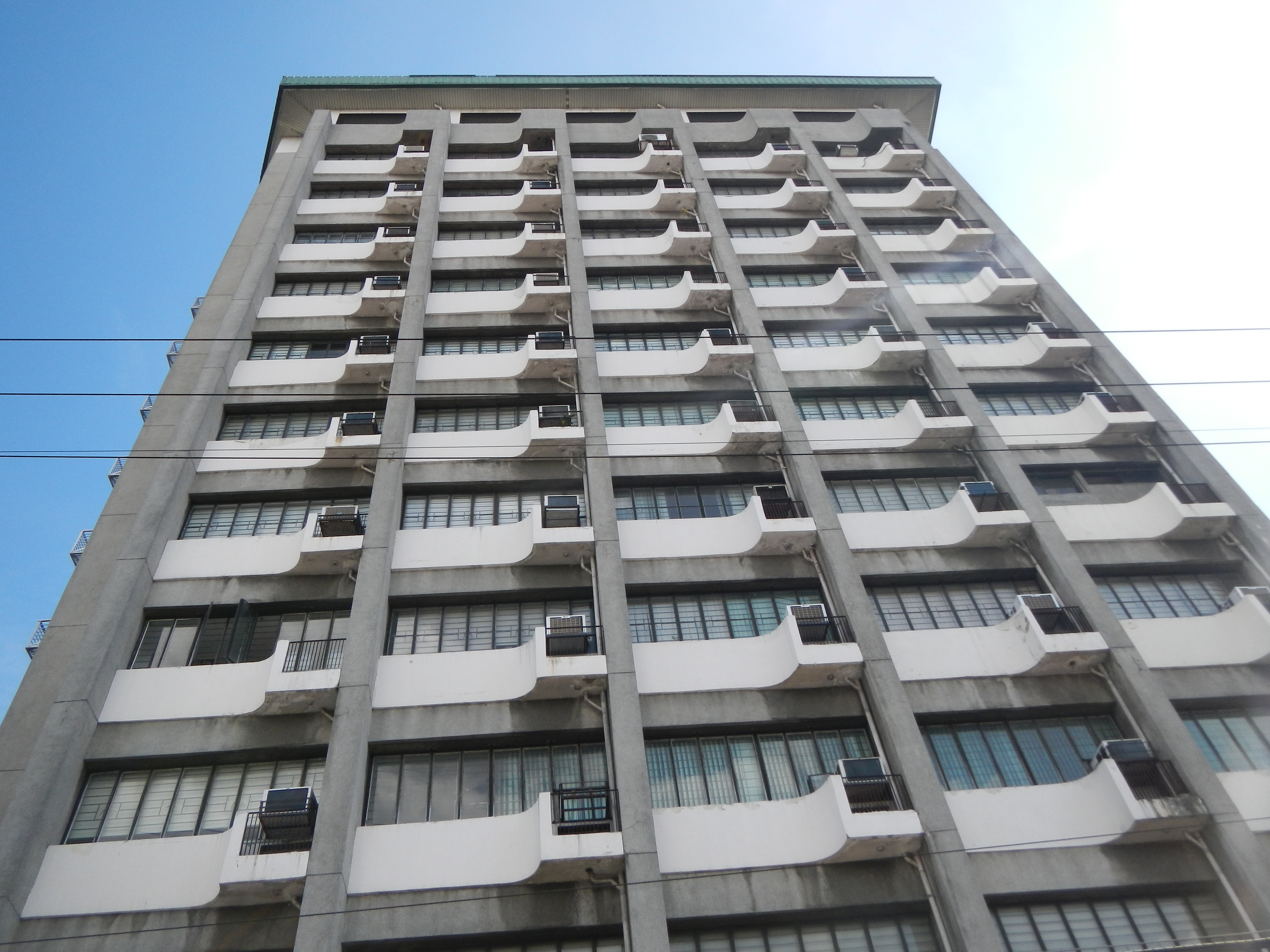
PMS building

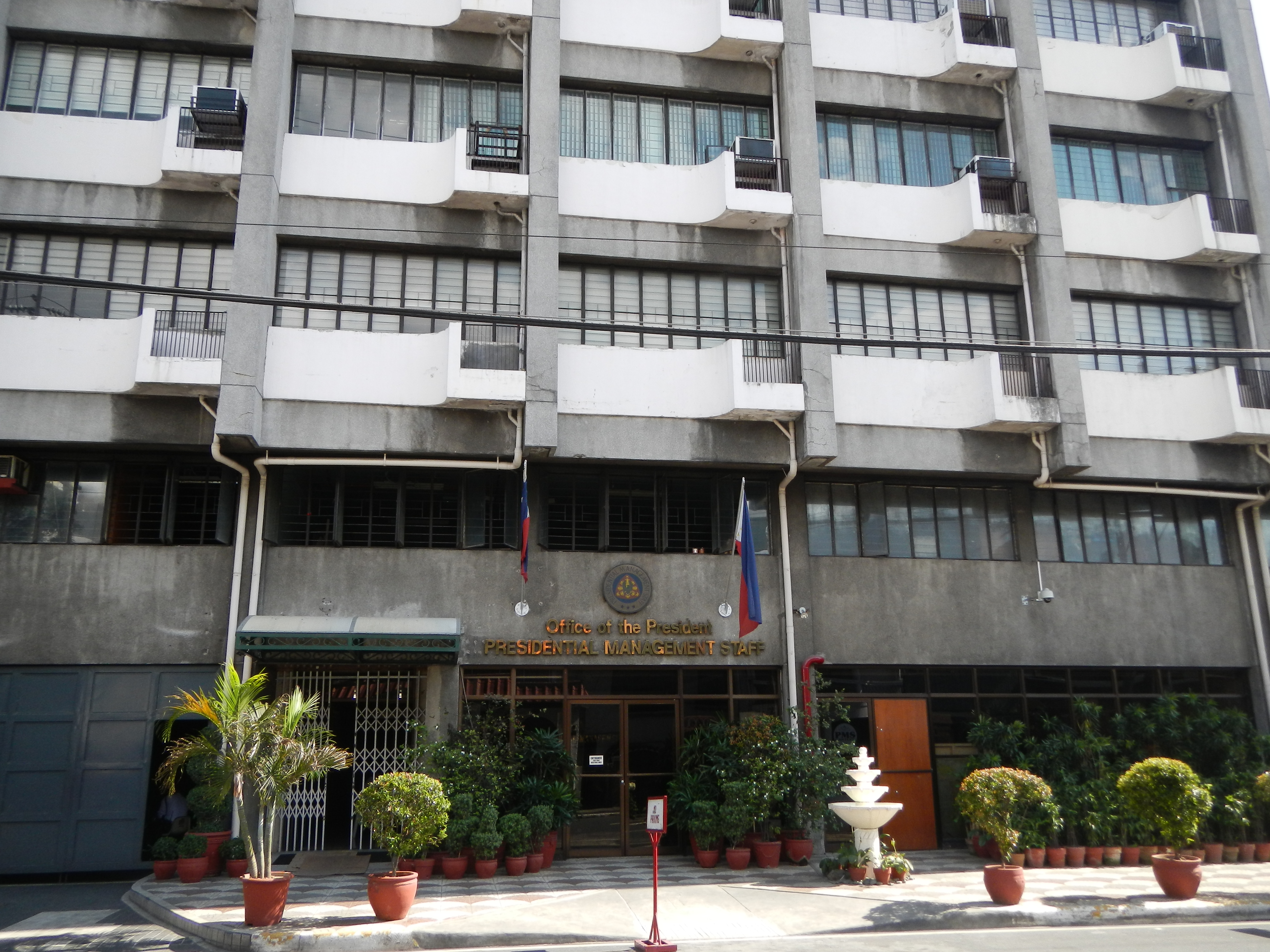
Frontage
