= Royina Garma =

Former Filipino policewoman and sweepstakes official

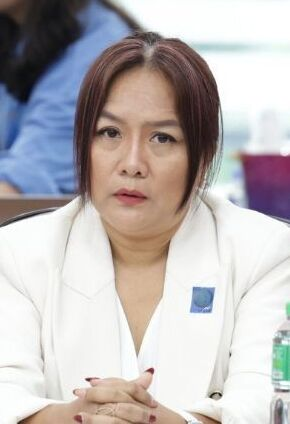
- Garma in 2024

General Manager of the Philippine Charity Sweepstakes Office
- In office July 15, 2019 – June 30, 2022
- President: Rodrigo Duterte
- Succeeded by: Melquiades Robles

Personal details
- Born: Royina Marzan Garma; 1972 or 1973 (age 53–54) Cagayan Valley, Philippines
- Spouse: Roland Vilela (annulled)
- Children: 1 (adoptive)
- Education: Philippine National Police Academy
- Police career
- Service: Philippine National Police
- Division: Criminal Investigation and Detection Group Region 7
- Police office: Davao City Police Office; Cebu City Police Office; Police Regional Office 11; Police Regional Office 7
- Service years: 1998–2019
- Rank: Police Colonel

Royina Marzan Garma is a retired police officer and government official.

She was a long-time police officer in Davao City and later in Cebu City from 2018 until her retirement in 2019. Garma was the general manager of the state-run Philippine Charity Sweepstakes Office from 2019 to 2022. She is known to be a close associate of Rodrigo Duterte.

== Education ==
Garma attended high school at the Saint Louis College of Tuguegarao, graduating in 1990. She obtained a bachelor's degree in mathematics at the Cagayan Colleges Tuguegarao in 1995. She attended the Philippine National Police Academy, graduating from the institution in 1997. Garma obtained a masters degree in education management from the Rizal Memorial Colleges in 2007 and an executive doctorate degree in leadership at the University of Makati in 2019.

== Career ==
=== Police career ===
==== Davao City and CIDG ====
Garma was a long-time officer of the Philippine National Police (PNP) in Davao City.

From 1996 to 1998, Garma was the anti-vice unit head of the city police during Rodrigo Duterte's third term as Davao City mayor. From 1999 to 2004, under mayor Benjamin de Guzman she led the city police's women and children's protection desk. She was officer for the Criminal Investigation and Detection Group (CIDG) working assignments in Metro Manila and Davao from 2004 to 2007.

In 2005, while assigned in Davao City, her then-husband Roland Vilela, who was head of the city police's anti-vice unit was accused of raping a 17-year old minor who came to him to ask for help to file charges against her aunt who forced her to prostitution. Garma pleaded to Duterte who was again mayor during that time, to not reassign him and had him only suspended.

In 2009, Garma settled in Davao City during the time Duterte was once again mayor. She began working as administrative officer under Ramon Apolinario. From 2011 and 2015, she was station commander of Sasa, the seaport and airport area of Davao; and Santa Ana which also covers Davao Chinatown.

She was appointed as the head of the CIDG for Region 7 (Central Visayas) on January 4, 2017. She held this role amidst the Philippine drug war waged by President Rodrigo Duterte. Aside from the drug war, Garma committed to make the arrest of Philippine Benevolent Missionaries Association supreme master and fugitive Ruben Ecleo Jr. possible as CIDG Region 7 head.

Garma would be one of the named personalities implicated in the case filed before the International Criminal Court against Duterte for the extrajudicial killings under the anti-drug operation in 2017 by self-confessed gunman Edgar Matobato. Another policeman SPO4 Arturo Lascanas, who was a self-confessed member of the Davao Death Squad (DDS), would name Police Captains Garma and Edilberto Leonardo as its operational heads in his affidavit to the ICC, while taking direct orders from then Davao Mayor Duterte's Special Assistant and now Senator Bong Go.

==== Cebu City ====
On July 1, 2018, Garma assumed the position of chief of the Cebu City police. She replaced Joel Doria. This was despite then-mayor Tomas Osmeña's opposition with the appointment due to allegations that Garma was receiving a ₱1 million weekly bribe as CIDG head.

Her relationship with the mayor was not cordial with Garma filing an obstruction of justice case against Osmeña for ordering the release of three suspects who were caught illegally refilling butane canisters with liquefied petroleum gas within the same year. Garma's case against Osmeña was dismissed by the Ombusdman in 2024.

In October 2018, Garma led an operation in Cebu City as part of the wider war on drugs of then President Rodrigo Duterte. A man suspected to be a drug user was allegedly shot in his sleep. The man's mother, through a sworn statement read in the 2024 congressional inquiries an alleged Garma visited the man's wake by his family and was quoted to have yelled "Why is there only one dead?".

PNP Region 7 chief Debold Sinas would praise the Cebu City police role under Garma in Duterte's war on drugs including the busting of the Ygot Drug Syndicate, and the confiscation of ₱600 million worth of suspected methamphetamine which is the biggest in the history of the city police.

That would be her final police assignment before opting an early retirement in 2019 with ten years left before reaching the mandatory retirement age of 56. She held the rank of Police Lieutenant Colonel.

Killings in the Cebu City rose under Garma. In a case before the International Criminal Court, Garma is named among the law enforcers who allegedly presided over death squad operations.

=== PCSO general manager ===
After 15 days from retiring, Garma would be appointed as the general manager of the Philippine Charity Sweepstakes Office (PCSO) by President Rodrigo Duterte. She served the role from July 15, 2019 until 2022. She would appoint her daughter and cousins to various positions within the agency.

==== Wesley Barayuga killing ====
PCSO board secretary Wesley Barayuga was shot dead in July 2020 in Mandaluyong. In September 2024, Santie Mendoza of the Philippine National Police-Drug Enforcement Group (PNP-PDEG) alleged that the death was an assassination claiming that National Police Commission Commissioner Edilberto Leonardo and Garma wanted Barayuga dead for the PCSO's official's alleged involvement in illegal drug trade.

General Rommel Marbil ordered the immediate full re-investigation of Barayuga's murder based on the new evidence, including the testimony of key witnesses Edilberto Leonardo and Garma during a House of Representatives quadcom hearing.

== Post-retirement and congressional inquiry ==
In 2024, Garma was linked to the August 2016 killings of three Chinese inmates at the Davao Prison and Penal Farm (DPPF) during inquiries by the House of Representatives of the Philippines on the Philippine drug war. DPPF head Gerardo Padilla alleged that Garma had coerced him to cooperate in the killings of the three Chinese nationals.

Her career in both the police and the PCSO as well as the extent of her relationship with former president Rodrigo Duterte was also put into scrutiny. She would make a personal appearance in the inquiries in September 2024.

Garma and her daughter went to the United States after her release. They were arrested San Francisco on November 7 and were ordered deported by the INS in coordination with the Philippine Bureau of Immigration. Garma applied for asylum but was denied prompting her to return to the Philippines in September 2025.

== Personal life ==
Garma was married to Roland Vilela who was a provincial police chief for Iloilo. She ended her marriage with Vilela through annulment after a scandal broke them up in 2007. She also has an adopted daughter. Spending most of her police career in Davao City, she was born in Cagayan Valley, with Cagayan as her home province. Garma also owns a tree house ("hilltop mansion") property in Balamban, Cebu.
