= Comprehensive Dangerous Drugs Act of 2002 =

Drug control law in the Philippines

12th Congress of the Philippines
- Long title: An Act Instituting the Comprehensive Dangerous Drugs Act of 2002, Repealing Republic Act No. 6425, Otherwise Known As the Dangerous Drugs Act of 1972, As Amended, Providing Funds Therefor, and for Other Purposes
- Citation: Republic Act No. 9165
- Territorial extent: Philippines
- Enacted by: House of Representatives of the Philippines
- Enacted by: Senate of the Philippines
- Signed by: Gloria Macapagal Arroyo
- Signed: June 7, 2002
- Commenced: June 22, 2002

Amends
- Republic Act No. 7659

Repeals
- Dangerous Drugs Act of 1972
- Status: In force

The Comprehensive Dangerous Drugs Act of 2002, officially designated as Republic Act No. 9165, is a consolidation of Senate Bill No. 1858 and House Bill No. 4433. It was enacted and passed by the Senate of the Philippines and House of Representatives of the Philippines on May 30 and 29, 2002, respectively. It was signed into law by President Gloria Macapagal Arroyo on June 7, 2002.

It repealed Republic Act No. 6425, otherwise known as the Dangerous Drugs Act of 1972, as amended, and providing funds for its implementation. Under this act, the Dangerous Drugs Board (DDB) remains as the policy-making and strategy-formulating body in the planning and formulation of policies and program on drug prevention and control.

It also created the Philippine Drug Enforcement Agency (PDEA) under the Office of the President, which serves as the implementing arm of the DDB. The PDEA is responsible for the enforcement of all the provisions on any dangerous drugs, controlled precursors and essential chemicals as provided in the act.

== Enforcement ==
The law took effect on June 22, 2002, 15 days after it was signed by Gloria Macapagal Arroyo. Its primary implementing agency is the Philippine Drug Enforcement Agency. The list of illegal drugs may be modified by the DDB through a proceeding initiated by the PDEA, the Department of Health, or any petition by a concerned party.

=== Penalties ===
Under the law, anyone found guilty of importation or sale of dangerous drugs, with the manufacture of illegal drugs, or with the operation of a drug den can be punished with life imprisonment and a fine ranging from ₱500,000 (then ~$10,000) to ₱10,000,000 (then ~$200,000). Anyone found guilty of importing or selling drug precursors, protecting other violators, or working as an employee in a drug den can be punished with 12 years and a day to 20 years of imprisonment and a fine ranging from ₱100,000 (then ~$2,000) to ₱500,000 (then ~$10,000). The maximum penalty is given if the sale or delivery was done within 100 meters of a school, if a minor was directly involved in the process of handling dangerous drugs, or if the victim of the offense is a mentally incapacitated individual.

The penalty for possession of illegal drugs depends on the quantity of the drug (regardless of quality) and the type of drug.

== See also ==
- Illegal drug trade in the Philippines
