= Sigue Sigue Sputnik (gang) =

Filipino gang

- Founded: 1960s
- Founding location: Tondo, Manila, Philippines
- Years active: 1960s–present
- Ethnicity: Filipino
- Criminal activities: drug trafficking, arms trafficking, murder
- Rivals: Bahala Na Gang, Sigue Sigue Commandos

Sigue Sigue Sputnik is a Filipino street gang. They are one of the largest and most well-known gangs, whose influence and territory extend throughout the slums of Tondo, Manila. They are one of the gangs present in major penitentiaries in Manila including Manila City Jail and New Bilibid Prison.

== Origins ==
High poverty led to many in Tondo, Manila to band and form gangs. The gang was born in the 1960s as part of two branching groups of "Sigue Sigue" hoodlums in Tondo, the other one being Sigue Sigue Commandos, who are the Sputnik's most ardent rival. During the decade, they made turfs of many slums and jails in Manila. Researcher Franklin G. Ashburn described them as "perhaps the most structured and best organized conflict gang in the Manila City Jail at the time".

The motto of the gang was "He who comes to destroy us, will himself be destroyed", which is a direct reference to the Visayan gangs like the Oxo group who the Sputniks felt had "invaded" the Tagalog territory of Manila. Their name was derived from the Russian orbital satellite of the same name because of its "spying" or "all-knowing" capabilities. The Sputniks pride themselves on their knowledge of what was going on both inside and outside of the jail at all times—among friends, enemies, and the police. In addition, the claim was made that the Sputnik organization is not confined to the Manila area alone, but that it was well known throughout the Philippines. Many murders in both the slums and in the jail of rival gangs were attributed to the Sputniks.

== Culture ==
All full members of the Sputnik gang must undergo an initiation where they must wear a "tatak" (tattoo or brand), considered to be a badge of honor. There was a pride among the Sputniks regarding the tatak that borders on "blood brother" ties. The tatak is usually tattooed on the buttocks of each member and the ones examined by the investigator were found to be works of art. Talent does not go unnoticed in confinement for the Sputniks had one member who was designated as the official artist and he enjoyed a high status position in the group. The Sigue Sigue Sputniks in confinement have an elaborate system of "kautusan" or "regulations" which have come down from the Muntinglupa Prison and to which the members must subscribe while in jail. These "regulations" are known as the "Ten Commandments" of the Sputniks and are as follows:

1. Thou shalt not "squeal".
2. Thou shalt not kill fellow members.
3. Thou shalt not organize another gang.
4. Thou shalt not be selfish.
5. Thou shalt not steal from fellow members.
6. Thou shalt not own your own knife. If you own a knife, the leader must keep it.
7. Thou shalt not tell fairy tales to fellow members.
8. Obey your leader.
9. Love and honor your mark.
10. Be careful.

There is no set punishment for any given offense until the case has been tried before a council of elders and judges. One exception to this rule is in cases involving "squealing" where the punishment is merciless. Although the role definitions of individual Sputnik members were diffuse, even for the leaders, there was one main role that all must play. Every member must at all times "be friendly" with every other member of the gang - a kind of forced practice of "pakikisama". Each must help their fellow member whenever asked to do so, regardless of the situation or the circumstances.

== Philippine drug war ==
The Sigue Sigue Sputnik gang became one of the most embroiled street gangs during the Philippine drug war. Various cases of violence were conducted by the gang during the war. On January 4, 2017, a Sputnik member named Randy Lizardo shot and killed policeman PO1 Enrico Domingo in Tondo. Domingo, together with other PNP officers, was conducting a buy-bust operation inside Lizardo's home. As the lawmen burst in, the gang surprised them from behind the curtains with handguns. Domingo was hit in the head and died instantly, while another, PO2 Harley Gacera, was wounded in the shoulder. Lizardo and the gang managed to get away, but he would later be captured as he tried to flee the city nine days later.

On July 27, 2020, big time gang leader Rolando Loyola was captured during Operation Pagtugis led by Regional Intelligence Division, NCRPO; MPD Police Station 4 in Sampaloc, Manila. Loyola was a known leader of a robbery stick-up group. The Sputnik gang was also one of the main combatants during the 2020 New Bilibid Prison riots, one of the largest prison riots in contemporary Philippines. Although the reasons varied for the cause of the riot (investigations either saying it was started when a Sputnik gang member was killed or beheaded, or one of their LGBT members was insulted). Nonetheless, the gang retaliated against an alliance of Sigue Sigue Commando and Abu Sayyaf convicts, who they believed were the ones responsible. During the two month long series of riots, gang members fought with improvised melee weapons, knives, arrows, and allegedly, firearms. The riot was quelled after a combined force of Special Action Force and SWAT members stormed the prison. Thirteen convicts from both sides were killed.

== In popular culture ==
- The gang's name was adopted in the 1980s by British new wave/punk band Sigue Sigue Sputnik.
- Bahala Na vs. Sputnik was a film released in 1995 that told the story of a gang war between the Bahala Na Gang and the Sputniks. The film starred George Estregan Jr. and Chuck Perez.
- Sigue Sigue Sputnik was featured in the Discovery Channel show Inside The Gangsters' Code episode "The Commandos" hosted by Louis Ferrante.
- The gang was also featured in the episode "Man Gets Attacked by Gang In The Filipino Slums" of the series Beyond Human Boundaries by Wonder.

== See also ==
- Bahala Na Gang
