= Bahala Na Gang =

Filipino gang

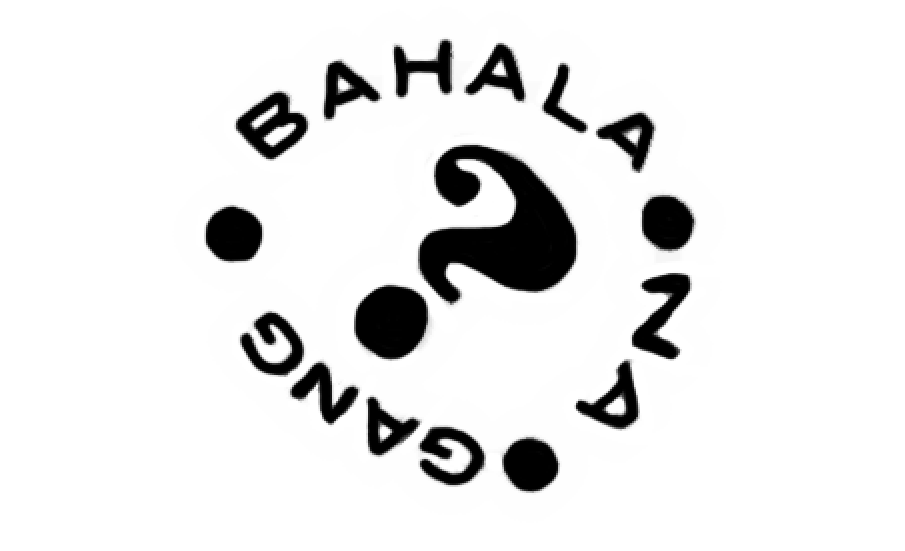
- Founded: 1940; 86 years ago
- Founding location: Sampaloc, Manila, Philippines
- Years active: 1940s–present
- Territory: Philippines and United States
- Ethnicity: Filipino
- Criminal activities: drug trafficking, weapons trafficking, murder
- Allies: Nuestra Familia; True Brown Style
- Rivals: Satanas; Bahala Na Barkada; Pinoy Real

The Bahala Na Gang (BNG) is a street gang founded in the Philippines which subsequently spread to the United States.

== Early history ==
The Bahala Na Gang was established in the early 1940s in Sampaloc, Manila, Philippines, by Divino Talastas, a native of Bulacan who was born in the early 1920s and who later moved with his siblings to Sampaloc. Before the formation of the Bahala Na Gang, Divino had a brother known as "Emong" who at the early age of 13–14 was most feared in the area, known for his fighting skill, and was notorious for targeting and killing police officers. This was rooted from his early trouble with the police, when he was arrested and tortured (including the use of electricity on his genitals), allegedly in order to secure his confession. When Emong was released, he became the top enemy for the police and soon, numerous murdered policemen followed and terror ensued. However, the authorities eventually found his whereabouts and shot him dead at the age of 15. A five-year-old half brother witnessed how his brother's dead body moved while gunshots continued to hit the body. The event would have an impact on Emong's siblings, including Divino (or Diving, as he was known in the area).

After Emong's death, there was a struggle for territorial power as to who would lead. Another gang tried to take control: the Sige-Sige Gang. This was the Golden Period of Philippine Street Gangs. To counter the existing Sige-Sige Gang, Divino formed the Bahala Na Gang, whose name he took from the existing night bar in Sampaloc, the "Bahala Na Bar." A place known as a meeting place for tough guys around the area. This was where Divino gained a reputation for his fighting skill. Divino was only 5'6, quiet, had a soft pleasant face, but was known for his skills fighting even with numerous men. He earned the respect within the criminal group. The earliest members were hardcore street fighters who were loyal to Emong; their main goal was merely to protect them from terror from other gangs. The gang spread and eventually many members of the gang were doing all kinds of criminal activities. Divino himself was a regular to Iwahig Prison, and whenever he would reside there, he held a top position among inmates, as their "mayor". Before he died, Divino himself told his story to few people he knew as he reached his old age. He died in the early 1980s, after being abducted, and his body was later found inside a sack floating in a river. There was evidence of torture and he most likely suffered a painful slow death, believed to be in connection with some kind of 'unfinished job' he made for one influential person of power.

== The 1960s ==
The gang continued to gain notoriety decades after the deaths of the original founders. In the 1960s, the gang eventually made their homes and territories in prisons throughout the Philippines, including New Bilibid Prison and the Bureau of Corrections. July 10, 1961, saw the highly-documented murder of Bahala Na Gang member, Roberto Monreal, who was forced to fight to a last stand after being cornered in the Manila City Jail by criminals Ramon Narciso y Contreras, Elias Gloria y Bernardino, Francisco Celso y Garcia and Rufino Peña y Guevarra.

It was in this decade where notorious BNG member Arturo Forcuna (aka Boy Golden) gained infamy. Forcuna was only forced to be inducted into the gang in desperation to survive the violence inside the Manila City Jail. In the 1960s, he became infamous for his numerous altercations with rival gangs such as the Sige-Sige Gang, at one point even surviving a beating with makeshift weapons from numerous members of the latter. At this time, the Bahala Na Gang's culture of violence became more widely recorded by law enforcement and journalists. Franklin G. Ashburn in his research book entitled Some Recent Inquiries into the Structure-Function of Conflict Gangs in Manila City Jail described the gang:

The literal translation of the title of this gang ("come what may") is an indication of its orientation. Of the four gangs, the Bahala Nas seemed to be the ones with the least organization and bound by the fewest rules, other than that of loyalty. Almost "psychopathic" in orientation, these gang members constantly referred to "thrill killings" or raiding rivals just for "the hell of it." The conflict extends beyond the limits of the rival gangs and violence may be directed toward the nearest person, whoever he might be. No explanation could be given for this behavior except that "life was hopeless" and that it really did not matter what one did if "fate" was against you. The Philippine value of "fatalism" was nowhere more apparent in the jail than with the Bahala Na members interviewed.

== Spread into California ==
The Bahala Na Gang spread into Filipino immigrant communities in the United States, especially California. Bahala Na Gang sets emerged throughout the San Diego area, Los Angeles area, San Jose, San Francisco Bay area, Stockton, and Sacramento as well as the Las Vegas area in Nevada. Older members are generally in their 50s and form much of the organization's base. Younger members, however, are the ones most likely to commit violent acts to prove themselves, often forming the muscle of much of the gang's drug and weapons trafficking activities. Outside of drug and weapon trafficking rings, gang members are involved in murder, robbery and kidnapping among others. At one point in the summer of 1990, a gang fight at a taco stand in which a dozen BNG members participated killed two people and injured five. The suspects were charged with 29 counts of murder, attempted murder, assault with a deadly weapon, chaos, conspiracy, battery and other things; total crimes of 348 criminal counts, one of the largest single cases in California murder history.

A well-publicized case involving the gang happened in July 2007 when BNG members Matthew N. Anderson, Jason R. Rodriguez and William K. Taylor attacked and almost mutilated a 15-year-old boy. The fight started when the victim insulted the gang on social media, prompting the three (and another accomplice) to confront the boy. Using a bolo knife, the teens hacked the boy multiple times, severing his arm "almost all the way to the bone". Reports also indicated that this was also an initiation ceremony for the youths to become full members of the gang. The boy survived and the three BNG members were charged with malicious wounding.

== Philippine drug war ==
Since President Rodrigo Duterte started his drug war in 2016, the Bahala Na Gang became one of the highly sought-after criminal groups in the conflict. On August 17, 2017, 25 alleged criminals were killed in separate police shootouts and drug busts, one of them a member of the gang. A gang member was also gunned down in a Manila street on April 20, 2019. In 2017, a member by the name of Niño Baccay was captured in a buy-bust operation in Quezon City. He was convicted of the illegal sale of methamphetamine. The year 2018 saw the capture of BNG member Crisanto Maguddatu in Sampaloc, Manila, by the Manila Police District after a tip and a careful surveillance. A packet of shabu (methamphetamine) and a .38 caliber revolver were found on him during the raid.

In June 2020, gang members Robert Yabut and Raymart Yabut were captured in a buy-bust operation together with members of the Sputnik gang. Late October 2020 also saw the capture of two more members, Gerald Agustin and May Junio, for three sachets of shabu worth ₱81,600.

== In popular culture ==
- The life of BNG member Arturo "Boy Golden" Porcuna has been portrayed in the film Boy Golden: Shoot to Kill in 2013
- Bahala Na vs. Sputnik was a film released in 1995 that told the story of a gang war between the Bahala Na Gang and the Sputniks. The film starred George Estregan Jr.
- The Bahala Na Gang was featured in the Discovery Channel show Inside The Gangsters' Code episode "The Commandos" hosted by Louis Ferrante.
- The "BNG" was referenced in Netflix's show The Lincoln Lawyer, in season 1, episode 7 around the 34:15 time mark.
- The Bahala Na Gang was featured in the Netflix docuseries Inside the World's Toughest Prisons in the episode "Philippines: The War on Drugs prison"
- The Bahala Na Gang is referenced in Sara Porkalob's solo cabaret Dragon Lady.

== See also ==
- Waray-Waray gangs
