= List of senators of the Philippines in the 17th Congress by seniority =

This is a complete list of senators of the Philippines during the 17th Congress of the Philippines listed by seniority from June 30, 2016, to June 30, 2019.

The criteria for seniority used in this article are derived from the cumulative length of service of a member of the Senate prior to the current Congress. Although an official roster ranking senators by seniority is not publicly available, their total cumulative years of service have been used to determine seniority. It has long been customary, following the practice of the United States Senate, to elect the most senior senator as either president of the Senate or president pro tempore, although this practice has become less common in the modern Senate. Furthermore, seniority is traditionally considered in the selection of chairpersons of major Senate committees.

In cases where senators have equal cumulative service, seniority is determined by the following criteria, in order:

- Longest uninterrupted period of service
- Earlier date on which the cumulative length of service was achieved
- Alphabetical order of surnames

In this Congress, Tito Sotto was the most senior senator, having previously served 18 years in Senate, while Joel Villanueva was the most junior senator.

== List of senators by seniority ==
Rank	Senator	Party		Length of previous tenures (Dates of previous tenures)	Notes
Rank	Senator	Start of Congress	End of Congress	Length of previous tenures (Dates of previous tenures)	Notes
1	Tito Sotto	NPC		18 years, 0 days (June 30, 1992 – June 30, 2004; June 30, 2010 – June 30, 2016)	Senate president (from May 21, 2018)
2	Franklin Drilon	Liberal		18 years, 0 days (June 30, 1995 – June 30, 2007; June 30, 2010 – June 30, 2016)	Senate president pro tempore (until February 27, 2017)
3	Gregorio Honasan	UNA		18 years, 0 days (June 30, 1995 – June 30, 2004; June 30, 2007 – June 30, 2016)	
4	Loren Legarda	NPC		15 years, 0 days (June 30, 1998 – June 30, 2004; June 30, 2007 – June 30, 2016)	
5	Panfilo Lacson	Independent		12 years, 0 days (June 30, 2001 – June 30, 2013)	
6	Kiko Pangilinan	Liberal		12 years, 0 days (June 30, 2001 – June 30, 2013)	
7	Ralph Recto	Liberal	Nacionalista	12 years, 0 days (June 30, 2001 – June 30, 2007; June 30, 2010 – June 30, 2016)	Senate president pro tempore (from February 27, 2017)
8	Francis Escudero	Independent	NPC	9 years, 0 days (June 30, 2007 – June 30, 2016)	
9	Alan Peter Cayetano	Nacionalista		9 years, 0 days (June 30, 2007 – June 30, 2016)	Resigned on May 17, 2017, upon being appointed as Secretary of Foreign Affairs.
10	Antonio Trillanes	Nacionalista		9 years, 0 days (June 30, 2007 – June 30, 2016)	
11	Dick Gordon	Bagumbayan–VNP		6 years, 0 days (June 30, 2004 – June 30, 2010)	
12	Koko Pimentel	PDP–Laban		4 years, 324 days (August 11, 2011 – June 30, 2016)	Senate president (until May 21, 2018)
13	Juan Miguel Zubiri	Independent		4 years, 34 days (June 30, 2007 – August 3, 2011)	
14	Sonny Angara	LDP		3 years, 0 days (June 30, 2013 – June 30, 2016)	
15	Bam Aquino	Liberal		3 years, 0 days (June 30, 2013 – June 30, 2016)	
16	Nancy Binay	UNA		3 years, 0 days (June 30, 2013 – June 30, 2016)	
17	JV Ejercito	PMP	NPC	3 years, 0 days (June 30, 2013 – June 30, 2016)	
18	Grace Poe	Independent		3 years, 0 days (June 30, 2013 – June 30, 2016)	
19	Cynthia Villar	Nacionalista		3 years, 0 days (June 30, 2013 – June 30, 2016)	
20	Leila de Lima	Liberal			Detained on February 24, 2017, for charges linked to the New Bilibid Prison drug trafficking scandal.
21	Sherwin Gatchalian	NPC			
22	Risa Hontiveros	Akbayan			
23	Manny Pacquiao	UNA	PDP–Laban		
24	Joel Villanueva	Liberal	Independent		
