= Willie Degel =

American chief and restauranteur

- Born: William Jack Degel; September 1, 1967 (age 59); Queens, New York, U.S.
- Occupations: Restaurateur, entrepreneur, TV personality, informant (former)
- Years active: 1989–present

Willie "The Beast of the East" Degel (born William Jack Degel on September 1, 1967) is an American restaurateur, television personality and convicted felon. He is the founder and CEO of Uncle Jack's Steakhouse chain in New York City. He is best known as the host of Restaurant Stakeout, a reality television show on the Food Network, and as a judge on Food Fortunes, a food business Shark Tank ripoff reality television show on the Food Network that was cancelled after one season.

== Early life ==
Degel was born and grew up in Queens, New York. He is the youngest of four brothers.

== Criminal record ==
At the age of 23, Degel and a friend, Austin Offen, reportedly harassed employees at a White Castle on Northern Blvd. in Bayside, Queens. An off-duty police officer, Edwin Buskirk, and a security guard attempted to intervene. Degel held back the security guard while Offen battered Buskirk. Officer Buskirk suffered fractures to his nose and his left eye socket. Offen and Degel were arrested, indicted for assault, and pleaded guilty to reduced charges: Offen to attempted assault, a felony, and Degel to third-degree assault, a misdemeanor. Offen received five years' probation and Degel got a conditional discharge. Officer Buskirk required facial surgery.

At the age of 27, Degel was convicted of credit card fraud. He was sentenced to five years in prison, but was released after six months after a plea deal. His witness testimony against his co-conspirators helped the government prosecution leading to their incarceration, including Gambino crime family mobster Louis Ferrante. In 2005, he was named one of Crain's "40 under 40" entrepreneurs in New York City.

== Career and television ==
Degel opened his first restaurant, Hollywood and Main, in June 1990 in Flushing, Queens. Six years later he created Uncle Jack's Steakhouse. Today, he owns three locations in New York City. As of March 12, 2012, Degel stars in his own show entitled Restaurant Stakeout. For the series, he goes behind the scenes of different restaurants across the country with hidden cameras to examine their service problems.
