= Boy Golden =

Boy Golden may refer to:

- Boy Golden, nickname of Arturo Porcuna, Filipino gangster of the Bahala Na Gang
  - Boy Golden: Shoot to Kill, a 2013 Philippine action film about Porcuna
- Boy Golden, the stage name of Canadian singer-songwriter Liam Duncan.
