= Jaybee Sebastian =

Filipino criminal

- Sebastian testifying at the Senate in 2016
- Born: Jaybee Niño Manicad Sebastian; January 20, 1980
- Died: July 18, 2020 (aged 40); Muntinlupa, Philippines
- Other name: Palos
- Status: Deceased
- Allegiance: Sigue Sigue Commando; Presidio
- Criminal charges: 2 counts of kidnap-for-ransom, one count of carnapping (2009)
- Penalty: 2 life imprisonment (kidnap-for-ransom); 17 years and four months-20 years imprisonment (carnapping)

Details
- Imprisoned at: Manila City Jail (until 2009); New Bilibid Prison (from 2009)

Jaybee Niño Manicad Sebastian (January 20, 1980 – July 18, 2020) was a Filipino high-profile inmate interned at the New Bilibid Prison (NBP) who was convicted for kidnap-for-ransom and carnapping in 2009. He was known for running a prison gang and was allegedly involved in the illegal drug trade within the prison.

== Criminal career ==
Sebastian was arrested in the early 2000s for kidnapping and carnapping and was detained at the Manila City Jail pending a decision on criminal charges against him. Inside the Manila jail, he became involved with Sigue Sigue Commando and served as an overall advisor to the prison gang. After his conviction in 2009, he was transferred to the New Bilibid Prison (NBP) in Muntinlupa.

At the NBP, Sebastian reportedly led Presidio, one of the two prison gangs involved in illegal drug trade. The other group was Carcel supposedly led by Herbert Colanggo, a convicted kidnapper.

During the administration of President Rodrigo Duterte, Sebastian was alleged by Justice Secretary Vitaliano Aguirre II of running a three-year funding campaign to support the Senate candidacy of Leila de Lima for the 2016 elections in exchange for de Lima tolerating Sebastian's drug trade involvement inside the NBP. De Lima was then Justice Secretary under Duterte's predecessor, Benigno Aquino III.

On September 28, 2016, Sebastian and two other inmates were injured, while a Chinese drug lord named Tony Co died after being involved in a stabbing incident in NBP Building 14.

== Death ==
Sebastian died of COVID-19 at the New Bilibid Prison Hospital on July 18, 2020, according to Bureau of Corrections officials. His body was immediately cremated in Dasmariñas, Cavite.

== See also ==
- New Bilibid Prison drug trafficking scandal
