= 2014 New Bilibid Prison raids =

Drug raids in the Philippines

Coordinates: 14°22′49″N 121°01′43″E

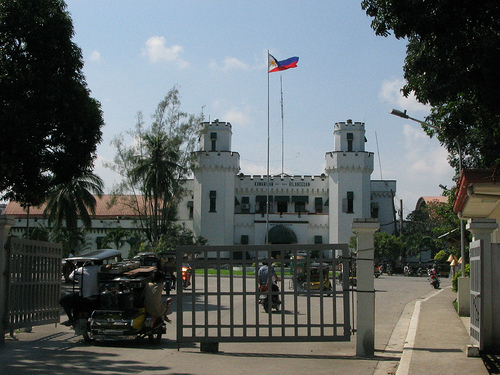
The New Bilibid Prison in Muntinlupa

The Philippine National Police, Philippine Drug Enforcement Agency, National Bureau of Investigation led by Justice secretary Leila de Lima launched a series of raids on the New Bilibid Prison on December 15, 19, and 22, 2014, targeting drug lords allegedly operating inside the prison and to seize contraband reportedly in possession of some of the prison's inmates. Prohibited items such as methamphetamine chloride (Filipino: shabu) and other drug paraphernalia, inflatable sex dolls, a stripper bar and jacuzzi were found in air-conditioned villas (Filipino: kubol) of high-profile inmates. Police also found other contraband in the prison, such as firearms and bladed weapons, mobile phones, flat-screen TVs, laptops, WIFi, luxury Patek Philippe, Cartier, and Rolex watches, a sauna, and over ₱2 million in cash from body searches of several inmates.

Officials handling the New Bilibid Prison were relieved on December 19 following an order from Ombudsman Conchita Carpio-Morales for an investigation on officials of the Bureau of Corrections. Bureau of Corrections chief Franklin Bucayu refused calls to resign following the findings of the raid.

In an interview at Malacañang Palace on December 24, 2014, Justice Secretary Leila de Lima said that while the discovery of illegal drugs and luxury items in the prison was "a pressing and scandalous issue," there was no need to fire Bucayu while the investigation was ongoing. De Lima defended Bucayu saying "it appears to me that he (Bucayu) was not in cahoots with the inmates. Perhaps he was hoodwinked by his men because he issued guidelines but these were not implemented."

The secretary also said that "at the very least, his shortcoming was that he was not hands-on," but noted that Bucayu "now submits reports every day." Meanwhile, Bucayu insisted that he merely inherited the problem in the penal system but eventually resigned on June 1, 2015, citing health concerns and multiple death threats against him.

== See also ==
- New Bilibid Prison drug trafficking scandal
