= Restaurant Stakeout =

American reality television series

- Genre: Reality
- Presented by: Willie Degel
- Country of origin: United States
- Original language: English
- No. of seasons: 5
- No. of episodes: 58

Production
- Executive producers: Alex Campbell; Jay Blumenfield; Joe Devito; Jon Beyer; Mike Colon; Tony Marsh

Original release
- Network: Food Network
- Release: March 11, 2012 – September 10, 2014

Restaurant Stakeout is a American reality television series on the Food Network. The series debuted on March 12, 2012, with the second season premiering on August 29, 2012. It is one of the first non-studio shows attempted on Food Network.

== Plot ==
The series follows William Jack "Willie" Degel, the owner of New York City restaurant Uncle Jack's Steakhouse, who goes behind the scenes of various restaurants across the country at the request of their owner(s). He takes the keys and installs hidden cameras to examine their service problems.

Willie and the owner(s) observe the restaurant's operation from a control room, and Willie comments about what he sees. Once Willie has assembled a list of key issues, the owner(s) calls a staff meeting. Willie appears at the meeting and confronts the staff with his findings. After that takes place, Willie returns the next day to help correct the problems. Some time later, Willie returns (now dressed in casual clothes) to get a status report.

The show differs from other similar shows in that its primary focus is on identifying ways to provide better customer service. Unlike Kitchen Nightmares and Restaurant: Impossible, there is rarely a problem with the cuisine, restaurant cleanliness, menu, or decor. The owner's main fault is being much too easy on the staff. Mystery Diners is also scripted, but usually about determining who is actively undermining the restaurant and getting them fired (although occasionally, a few employees have been fired on this show).

== Episodes ==
=== Series overview ===
| Season | Episodes | Originally released | |
| Season | Episodes | First released | Last released |
|---|---|---|---|
| 1 | 6 | March 11, 2012 | April 11, 2012 |
| 2 | 13 | August 29, 2012 | December 12, 2012 |
| 3 | 13 | March 13, 2013 | June 26, 2013 |
| 4 | 13 | September 11, 2013 | January 8, 2014 |
| 5 | 13 | June 4, 2014 | September 10, 2014 |

=== Season 1 (2012) ===
| No. overall | No. in season | Title | Restaurant | Location | Original release date |
|---|---|---|---|---|---|
| 1 | 1 | "From the Top Down" | Firefly Restaurant | Las Vegas, NV | March 11, 2012 |
| 2 | 2 | "Party All the Time" | Lexington Grille & Pub | Bardonia, NY | March 14, 2012 |
| 3 | 3 | "Find the Leader to Follow" | Mt. Ivy Café | Pomona, NY | March 21, 2012 |
| 4 | 4 | "The Son and the Father" | Agnello's Pizzeria | New City, NY | March 28, 2012 |
| 5 | 5 | "Paint by Numbers" | Bar + Bistro | Las Vegas, NV | April 4, 2012 |
| 6 | 6 | "Oh, Brother" | Willy Parkers American Bar & Grill | Williston Park, NY | April 11, 2012 |

=== Season 2 (2012) ===
| No. overall | No. in season | Title | Restaurant | Location | Original release date |
|---|---|---|---|---|---|
| 7 | 1 | "Nobody's Runnin' the Store" | Trends Restaurant | Staten Island, NY | August 29, 2012 |
| 8 | 2 | "When the Cat's Away" | Nauna's Bella Casa | Montclair, NJ | September 5, 2012 |
| 9 | 3 | "The Customer's Always Wrong" | Oakwood Diner | Staten Island, NY | September 12, 2012 |
| 10 | 4 | "Damsel in Distress" | PepperJack Grill | Staten Island, NY | September 19, 2012 |
| 11 | 5 | "Who Hires These People?" | Pita Grill | Hoboken, NJ | September 26, 2012 |
| 12 | 6 | "Act Like the Boss" | Liberty Bar & Grill | Hoboken, NJ | October 10, 2012 |
| 13 | 7 | "That Money's Out the Door" | Anna Maria's Italian Restaurant | Larchmont, NY | October 17, 2012 |
| 14 | 8 | "This Place Is a Circus" | Serata | Oyster Bay, NY | October 24, 2012 |
| 15 | 9 | "You Can't Fire Family" | Ariana Restaurant | Huntington, NY | November 14, 2012 |
| 16 | 10 | "On Its Last Leg" | Haven Grill BBQ | Port Washington, NY | November 21, 2012 |
| 17 | 11 | "Little Place, Lotsa Drama" | Taqueria Autentica | Bloomfield, NJ | November 28, 2012 |
| 18 | 12 | "My Big Fat Greek Nightmare" | Athena Mediterranean Cuisine | Park Slope, Brooklyn, NY | December 5, 2012 |
| 19 | 13 | "A Bunch of Spoiled Brats" | Joey D's Pizzeria & Restaurant | Metuchen, NJ | December 12, 2012 |

=== Season 3 (2013) ===
| No. overall | No. in season | Title | Restaurant | Location | Original release date |
|---|---|---|---|---|---|
| 20 | 1 | "Barbecue with Attitude" | Hot Rods BBQ | Wharton, NJ | March 13, 2013 |
| 21 | 2 | "Mamma's Boy" | Latin Kitchen | Bronx, NY | March 20, 2013 |
| 22 | 3 | "You Can't Be Everything" | AJ's Burgers | New Rochelle, NY | March 27, 2013 |
| 23 | 4 | "Three Strikes and You're Out!" | Shiraz Persian Restaurant | Elmsford, NY | April 3, 2013 |
| 24 | 5 | "The Big, Not So, Easy" | The Bayou | North Bellmore, NY | April 15, 2013 |
| 25 | 6 | "To Catch a 'Restaurant' Thief" | Danny's Grill & Wine Bar | Red Bank, NJ | April 24, 2013 |
| 26 | 7 | "Giving Away the House" | Gus's Franklin Park Restaurant | Harrison, NY | May 1, 2013 |
| 27 | 8 | "Kitchen Mafia" | Dock's Clam Bar | Staten Island, NY | May 8, 2013 |
| 28 | 9 | "Your Smokehouse Is a JOKEhouse" | Smokehouse Barbecue | Somerville, NJ | May 29, 2013 |
| 29 | 10 | "The Place Is a Ghost Town" | Roasted Peppers | Mamaroneck, NY | June 5, 2013 |
| 30 | 11 | "Tuscan Tumbleweeds" | The Venetian Grille | Somerville, NJ | June 12, 2013 |
| 31 | 12 | "What Would Your Father Do?" | Michael's Roscommon House | Belleville, NJ | June 19, 2013 |
| 32 | 13 | "What Are You Servin' Here?" | Barzola | Flushing, Queens, NY | June 26, 2013 |

=== Season 4 (2013–14) ===
| No. overall | No. in season | Title | Restaurant | Location | Original release date |
|---|---|---|---|---|---|
| 33 | 1 | "Joe Broadway's or Bust" | Joe Broadway's | Staten Island, NY | September 11, 2013 |
| 34 | 2 | "Your Mom's Gotta Go" | Sugo Café | Long Beach, NY | September 18, 2013 |
| 35 | 3 | "Blonde Ambition" | BlonDee's Bistro & Bar | Huntington, NY | September 25, 2013 |
| 36 | 4 | "Complete Pushover" | 90 Park | North Bergen, NJ | October 2, 2013 |
| 37 | 5 | "Kiss Beso Goodbye" | Beso | Bedford-Stuyvesant, Brooklyn, NY | October 9, 2013 |
| 38 | 6 | "Family Style Failure" | The Original Mama Angelo's | North Arlington, NJ | October 16, 2013 |
| 39 | 7 | "Bad News Bistro" | PK's Restaurant & Lounge | Staten Island, NY | October 23, 2013 |
| 40 | 8 | "Clueless Cousins" | VB3 | Jersey City, NJ | October 30, 2013 |
| 41 | 9 | "Starving for Customers" | A Plate of Soul | Jamaica, Queens, NY | November 27, 2013 |
| 42 | 10 | "Whine Bar" | 12 Grapes | Peekskill, NY | December 4, 2013 |
| 43 | 11 | "Somers Almost Over" | Somers 202 | Yorktown Heights, NY | December 11, 2013 |
| 44 | 12 | "Division Street Disaster" | Division Street Grill | Peekskill, NY | December 18, 2013 |
| 45 | 13 | "Dysfunction Junction" | Junction 46 | Ledgewood, NJ | January 8, 2014 |

=== Season 5 (2014) ===
| No. overall | No. in season | Title | Restaurant | Location | Original release date |
|---|---|---|---|---|---|
| 46 | 1 | "Las Vegas Stakeout" | Buon Gusto Italian Restaurant | Las Vegas, NV | June 4, 2014 |
| 47 | 2 | "Sushi on the Strip" | Osaka's Japanese Cuisine | Las Vegas, NV | June 11, 2014 |
| 48 | 3 | "Hoover Dam'd Pizza" | Vinny's Pizzeria | Boulder City, NV | June 18, 2014 |
| 49 | 4 | "Unlucky in Vegas" | Sonrisa Grill | Las Vegas, NV | June 25, 2014 |
| 50 | 5 | "Hammered in Vegas" | Hammers Grill & Bar | Henderson, NV | July 2, 2014 |
| 51 | 6 | "Ciao, Vegas!" | Gina's Bistro | Las Vegas, NV | July 16, 2014 |
| 52 | 7 | "Golf Course Stakeout" | Oh' Brian's On the Green | Clark, NJ | July 23, 2014 |
| 53 | 8 | "Fuggedabout Mario" | Mario's Tutto Bene | Union, NJ | July 30, 2014 |
| 54 | 9 | "Willie Shuts It Down" | Red Room | New Rochelle, NY | August 6, 2014 |
Willie comes to the aid of the owners of a restaurant that has previously suffered a money theft that has prevented the owner's mother from retiring. For the first time in show history, Willie does not try to help revive the restaurant after seeing too many key issues with the restaurant. The owner and his wife decide to shut down after Willie meets with the staff where Willie ends up calling in an associate that specializes in restaurant auctions to help the owners raise money for the owner's mother to finally retire.
| 55 | 10 | "Father Daughter Stakeout" | Villa Monaco Restaurant | West Islip, NY | August 13, 2014 |
| 56 | 11 | "Standup Stakeout" | Stress Factory Comedy Club | New Brunswick, NJ | August 20, 2014 |
| 57 | 12 | "Grand Opening Stakeout" | Brookside Grill | Highland Mills, NY | September 3, 2014 |
| 58 | 13 | "Million Dollar Stakeout" | Trovato's Due | Oakland, NJ | September 10, 2014 |
