= New Bilibid Prison drug trafficking scandal =

Filipino drug trafficking scandal

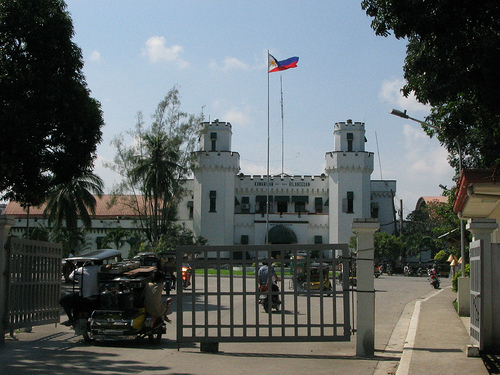
The New Bilibid Prison complex

The New Bilibid Prison drug trafficking scandal is a criminal investigation and political scandal concerning allegations of government involvement in illegal drug trade at the New Bilibid Prison in Muntinlupa, Metro Manila, Philippines. The allegations were made by President Rodrigo Duterte after announcing that the two top convicted drug lords in the country continued to run their drug rings from inside the national penitentiary with former administration officials and their local government cohorts as co-conspirators.

On August 25, 2016, Duterte released a drug matrix showing the structure of drug trafficking operations at the New Bilibid Prison and identified the two former top officials of the Department of Justice, the former provincial governor and board member of Pangasinan, and the former Bureau of Corrections director as being involved in the Bilibid narcotics trade.

== Background ==
Reports of illegal drug trafficking and use among inmates of the New Bilibid Prison have surfaced increasingly since 2014 when officials under the administration of President Benigno Aquino III launched a series of raids under Oplan Galugad ("Operation Surprise Inspection") at the national penitentiary. In a much publicized December 2014 raid, the police discovered methamphetamine (Filipino: shabu) and other drug paraphernalia, inflatable sex dolls, a stripper bar and jacuzzi spread across 19 air-conditioned villas (Filipino: kubol) built for convicted drug dealers.

In subsequent raids, police also found other items and contrabands prohibited in the prison such as firearms and bladed weapons, mobile phones, flat screen TVs, laptops, WIFi, luxury Patek Philippe, Cartier and Rolex watches, sauna and over ₱2 million in cash from body searches of several high profile inmates.

In the luxurious villa of convicted drug lord Peter Co linked by secret pathways to areas around the Bilibid, authorities also seized documents containing a list of names with corresponding cash amounts and dates. In another kubol occupied by convicted drug lord and robbery gang leader Herbert Colanggo, a 60-square-meter music studio was discovered where he reportedly was able to even produce a music video that went viral on YouTube.

The Department of Justice, which supervises the New Bilibid Prison through its Bureau of Corrections, conducted more than 30 raids from 2014 to 2016 under then Justice Secretary Leila de Lima.

Despite the raids which resulted in the termination and replacement of prison personnel, the transfer of several convicted drug dealers to the National Bureau of Investigation detention facility, the demolition of luxurious prison villas, and regular searches and seizures, illegal drug trade continued at the maximum security prison as the Secretary admitted in 2015.

The issue of illegal drug operations at the Bilibid persisted throughout the remaining months of Aquino's term and even became a contentious election topic in 2016. During the 2nd presidential debate held in Cebu City in March 2016, Duterte called administration candidate and former Interior Secretary Mar Roxas a "fraud" and blasted the administration for "allowing shabu to be cooked inside the national penitentiary."

Leila de Lima, then running for senator, slammed Duterte's allegation and said there was no truth in the claims that drug trade flourished in the Bilibid during the Aquino administration.

== Allegations ==
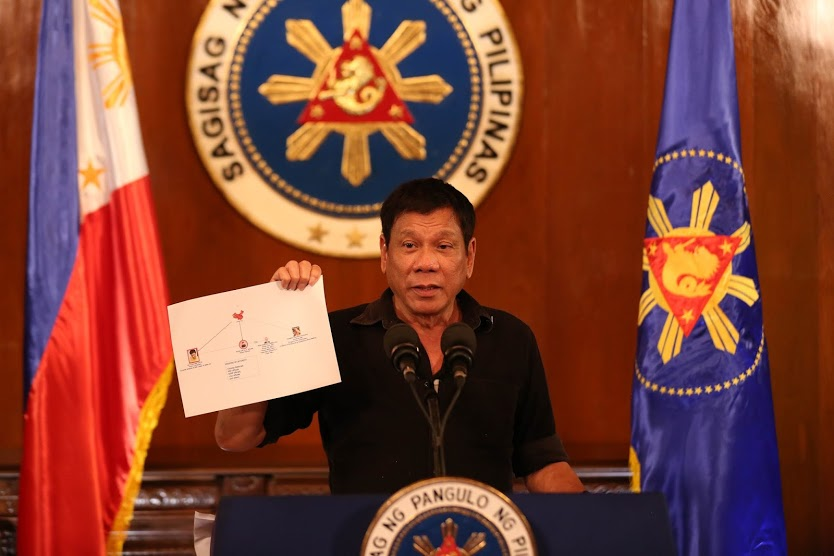
President Rodrigo Duterte presents a chart illustrating a drug trade network of high level drug syndicates in the Philippines during a press conference

Following his victory in the May 2016 elections, Duterte launched an intensified anti-drug campaign and ordered the investigation of the personalities behind the proliferation of illegal drug trade at the Bilibid. The new Justice Secretary Vitaliano Aguirre II reported that 75% of drug transactions in the country were being "cooked" in Bilibid and announced that eliminating drug trade in prisons will be a priority of his department.

On July 7, 2016, just one week since he took office, Duterte publicly named the top three drug lords behind the huge syndicates in the country and threatened to kill them if they continue their operations. He identified them as Wu Tuan alias "Peter Co", a Chinese triad member operating in Metro Manila and Luzon, Herbert Colanggo (sometimes spelled Colangco) alias "Ampang", another Chinese who was reported to be connected to Kuratong Baleleng and the Parojinog drug syndicate in Mindanao, and Peter Lim, also known as "Jaguar," also a Chinese triad member operating in the Visayas who remains at large.

According to Duterte, both Co and Colanggo are detained at the New Bilibid Prison but continue to run the drug operations of their respective groups. Peter Co was convicted for selling shabu back in 2001 while Colanggo has been serving time at the maximum security compound since 2009. While Duterte earlier identified five Philippine National Police generals as protectors of the drug lords, he also said that his administration is investigating several other government officials and local executives as "persons of interest."

Former Dangerous Drugs Board director and now Solicitor General Jose Calida released a photo on July 22, 2016 showing De Lima side by side with convicted inmate Jaybee Sebastian in orange prison uniform taken in a kubol inside the Bilibid. In a press conference, Calida asked the members of the media present if it was appropriate for a justice secretary to be "rubbing elbows with a convicted felon." He said the photo will be investigated, as well as Sebastian's links to the former secretary as he vowed that "public officials who are coddling drug lords and criminals will be put to jail."

Earlier, a video went viral on social media showing De Lima singing at a party with what netizens claimed to be the convicted drug lord Herbert Colanggo.

From July 20–26, 2016, in the first major raids at the Bilibid since President Duterte took office, the Special Action Force troopers which took over the prison's security operations from the Bureau of Corrections jail guards, was able to confiscate ₱1.1 million worth of contraband including firearms, mobile phones, marijuana and shabu. They also discovered tunnels in the complex where shabu was being cooked.

In an update to the media on the results of the investigation in the Bilibid, Secretary Aguirre revealed that at least two high-ranking former officials of the Department of Justice as well as officials of the Bureau of Corrections which he refused to name have allegedly received millions from high profile inmates for special treatment.

On August 25, 2016, Duterte tagged the former Justice Secretary, now Senator Leila de Lima as being involved in the Bilibid drug trade. In the drug matrix released to the media which shows the drug trafficking operations in the prison, Duterte also identified former Pangasinan governor, now Congressman Amado Espino Jr., former Justice Undersecretary Francisco Baraan III and De Lima's former driver and alleged lover Ronnie Dayan as part of the Bilibid drug network.

Personalities linked to the New Bilibid Prison drug trafficking operations
Name	Position
Francisco Baraan III	Former Undersecretary; Department of Justice
Rafael Baraan	Administrator; Province of Pangasinan
Franklin Bucayu	Regional Director; Philippine National Police Region I (former Director of the Bureau of Corrections)
Ronnie Dayan	Leila de Lima's former driver and bodyguard
Leila de Lima	Senator (former Secretary of Justice)
Amado Espino Jr.	Pangasinan-5th District Representative (former Governor of Pangasinan)
Raul Sison	Board Member; Province of Pangasinan

Ronnie Dayan, then working for Secretary de Lima, was identified as the drug money collector in the Bilibid and a "case fixer" of well-known politicians in Pangasinan. In a statement a week earlier prior to the start of the Senate probe on alleged extrajudicial killings in the current drug campaign, Duterte called de Lima "immoral" for having an affair with her driver Dayan, a married man, who he claimed collected money from the Bilibid drug lord inmates to fund her senatorial campaign. The president also claimed that de Lima had built a mansion for Dayan in Urbiztondo, Pangasinan from the drug protection money they collected, and that there was evidence from wiretaps and ATM records that would show that the former driver-bodyguard of de Lima transacted with drug syndicates at the New Bilibid Prison when she was Justice Secretary.

The drug matrix also links former Pangasinan governor Espino to then Justice Undersecretary Francisco "Toti" Baraan and his brother, Pangasinan administrator Raffy Baraan, whom the governor allegedly used to cover for his illegal activities. It said that both Baraan and Espino were involved in black sand mining operations in Pangasinan with Espino being charged earlier with plunder for illegal mining. General Bucayo was identified as protector of the narco politicians who was appointed as the PNP Director for Region 1 and as the Bureau of Corrections chief through the help of Secretary de Lima.

A certain “Ms. Cardenosa” also appears in the matrix. She is connected to Dayan and serving as the dummy for his properties. The drug matrix also shows Pangasinan Board Member Sison as connected with “Ms. Cardenosa” and Governor Espino. Malacañang Palace Communications Secretary Martin Andanar later clarified to the media that the President's drug matrix was based on strong evidence from intelligence reports from the Philippine Drug Enforcement Agency and the Philippine National Police and that it went through thorough validation.

Following the exposé from the President, two former National Bureau of Investigation deputy directors have come forward and said they are willing to testify against de Lima. The two NBI officers, Reynaldo Esmeralda and Ruel Lasala, were discharged by the former Justice Secretary in March 2014 on grounds of their alleged links to the Priority Development Assistance Fund scam, other "derogatory reports" about them, and being presidential appointees, they can be removed by simple loss of integrity and confidence. They however claim that they were given separation orders by de Lima without due process because they were investigating her then.

Two former employees of the Department of Justice have also come forward to Secretary Aguirre with affidavits implicating de Lima in the Bilibid drug trade. Jonathan Caranto and Edna Obuyes, both former receiving clerks in the department under De Lima, presented bank deposit slips showing money transfers in millions of pesos to Ronnie Dayan's account. They said De Lima asked them to make those deposits. Secretary Aguirre claimed Caranto and Obuyes were not coerced into signing the affidavits and that they volunteered to testify in order to clear their names.

Secretary Aguirre also told the media that other NBI agents, former Bureau of Corrections officials, and at least 12 high profile inmates at the New Bilibid Prison have executed sworn statements against De Lima with two of those witnesses claiming to have personally handed ₱5 million in cash to the former Justice Secretary at her house in Parañaque. Aguirre also announced that convicted drug lord Herbert Colanggo was among those who have executed their affidavits and who agreed to testify against De Lima.

In a speech during his visit to police officers wounded or killed in the ongoing war against drugs on August 29, 2016 in Tacloban, President Duterte called for the senator to resign and said "If I were De Lima, I'll [sic] hang myself." While admitting there were "snippets of truths" in those allegations, De Lima however said "the bulk of it are distortions, exaggerations, and lies." The senator also said she will not take part in any inquiry on the Bilibid drug trade. Congressman Espino also denied the allegations.

On September 27, 2016 during the inspection of the biggest shabu factory ever discovered by the PNP and PDEA in Arayat, Pampanga, President Duterte cleared former Pangasinan Governor Amado Espino Jr., Provincial Administrator Rafael Baraan and Board Member Raul Sison of the charges relating to the illegal drug trade at the New Bilibid Prison, publicly apologized to them for the lapse in the validation of the intelligence report, but maintained that the charges of illegal mining against Espino and Baraan remain valid as the Sandiganbayan has already decided on the case and ordered their suspension.

Aguirre said, on 5 October, that the convicted drug lords were able to transact up to ₱15 billion worth of illegal drugs during the last two years of Benigno Aquino III administration.

== Investigation ==
Following earlier pronouncements from Secretary Vitaliano Aguirre II on alleged links of former Justice Department officials in the Bilibid trade, House Speaker Pantaleon Alvarez called for a resolution to probe de Lima and the alleged proliferation of drugs in the previous administration. Representatives Raneo Abu and Karlo Nograles authored House Resolution No. 105 calling for the investigation, in aid of legislation, which was passed by the House of Representatives on July 21, 2016. Nograles said the purpose of the inquiry was to find out how drugs were manufactured in the Bilibid as well as the connections of certain personalities in the illegal activity. Abu, on the other hand, said he wanted the inquiry to focus on the Bilibid prison raids where a shabu laboratory, high-powered firearms, other weapons and luxury items were discovered. The lawmakers also said it is the aim of the house probe to strengthen the penitentiary system by helping lawmakers to come up with measures to ensure that the national prisons would be free from drugs and corruption.

The House Committee on Justice led by its chairman Representative Reynaldo Umali scheduled the probe beginning on September 20, 2016 with the accused Ronnie Dayan tapped as the principal resource person. Umali said that an invitation will also be sent to De Lima and that a subpoena will be issued to Dayan if he fails to attend.

In the Senate, an ethics complaint was filed against its member Senator Leila de Lima on August 30, 2016 following the release of the Bilibid drug matrix by President Duterte. Majority Leader Tito Sotto who chairs the Senate ethics committee said the seven-member committee will take up the complaint from private lawyer Abelardo de Jesus on September 13, 2016. In the said hearing, President pro tempore Franklin Drilon questioned the Senate's jurisdiction over the case as it involves alleged illegal acts which happened before de Lima was elected senator.

=== House Committee on Justice investigation ===
Investigation in the House of Representatives Committee on Justice began on September 20, 2016 with the panel chair Oriental Mindoro Representative Reynaldo Umali saying the hearing is not about persecuting Senator de Lima but to get to the bottom of the proliferation of drug syndicates in the prison. Secretary Aguirre requested for legislative immunity for the witnesses who will testify which was granted by House Speaker Alvarez after no objections were raised by the committee members present. The Department of Justice then presented the 2013 Discovery Channel documentary "Inside the Gangsters' Code" which featured the gangs controlling the Bilibid and their illegal drug operations both in and out of the maximum security prison. The show also featured an interview by the host Louis Ferrante with gang leader Jaybee Sebastian in his kubol where he showed his office where he operated his own television network as well as his pictures with prominent government officials including Justice Secretary De Lima. After which, the Special Action Force presented their accomplishments and the changes in the Bilibid since taking over its security operations on July 20, 2016.

By the end of the House probe on November 24, 2016, the following resource persons have presented their testimonies at the committee: Bilibid inmates Herbert Colanggo, Noel Martinez, Rodolfo Magleo, Jaime Patcho, Jojo Baligad, Froilan Trestiza, Hans Anthony Tan, Peter Co and Jaybee Sebastian; NBI officers Rafael Ragos and Jovencio Ablen; PNP Deputy Director Benjamin Magalong; and former security aides Joenel Sanchez and Ronnie Dayan.

==== Colanggo's testimony ====
Herbert Colanggo, one of the Bilibid 19 or the high profile drug lord inmates that were found to be living in luxury kubols in 2014, exposed the PR payola being paid to several government officials in exchange for special treatment and for being able to bring in contraband in the prison. He testified that he had remitted ₱3 million per month to then Secretary De Lima since October 2013 and an additional ₱1 million whenever he held concerts in the Bilibid. He said De Lima's security aide Jonel Sanchez regularly collected the bribe money in his kubol which he said came from his earnings from his lending business, selling beer in prison, bringing in women prostitutes and selling them to inmates at a high price, and the concerts and other events he organized in Bilibid with his manager Renante Diaz. Colanggo then presented to the committee the mobile number that was used by Sanchez to call De Lima in January 2014 when he was able to speak to the then justice secretary to confirm if she was receiving the payments. De Lima supposedly answered "Okay, okay. Thank you." Secretary Aguirre then informed the House panel that they have secured a certification from Department of Justice confirming that the number provided by Colanggo was indeed registered to De Lima. Colangco also presented to the committee the receipts from his payments to De Lima's bagman, Sanchez which his manager Diaz sent via M Lhuillier remittance center.

Colanggo also narrated his encounter with Jaybee Sebastian, who he said was chairman or leader that controlled the other half of the Bilibid business. He said Sebastian approached him for help in raising funds for De Lima's senatorial campaign by selling methamphetamine. Joenel Sanchez followed up on this request and reminded Colanggo about the instruction to push at least 10 kilos of shabu per month. Colanggo eventually agreed to the deal. He was also asked by Ronnie Dayan (who was De Lima's bagman assigned to Sebastian) to collect 30 to 50 kilos of illegal drugs from Chinese drug lords without paying them but that he did not agree to it. Colanggo said that during the December 15, 2014 prison raid led by Secretary de Lima, he was one of those who were transferred to the NBI detention which he said he did not expect because he was already giving ₱3 million to the secretary. He approached De Lima to say that he was already agreeing to Ronnie Dayan's request so long as he is not transferred. He said De Lima's reply to him was "Got it, got it" which was quickly followed by "Herbert, you'll be temporarily placed here." However, Colanggo said he was detained at the NBI for 8 months, and said it was to allow Jaybee Sebastian to control the whole Bilibid drug operations.

Colanggo also told the committee that ₱1.2 million payola was paid monthly to then Bureau of Corrections chief Franklin Bucayo since 2013 which was coursed through Colonel Ely. He said he also gave ₱500,000 to Justice Undersecretary Francisco Baraan through his aide Susan for every inmate that pays to be transferred from medium security to the comforts of the maximum security compound.

==== Ragos' and Ablen's testimonies ====
National Bureau of Investigation director and former Bureau of Corrections (BuCor) officer-in-charge Rafael Ragos' testimony stated that the delivery of millions of drug money at De Lima's house in Parañaque. Ragos testified that he personally handed ₱5 million in cash to Ronnie Dayan at the secretary's residence on November 24, 2012. The money was placed inside a black handbag which Ragos found in the BuCor's office. He asked NBI intelligence agent Jovencio Ablen to accompany him to Parañaque after receiving the instruction. Ablen, who was then working with Ragos on the investigation in the Bilibid explosion a week before, said Ragos told him that they were bringing the quota to the Grandmother (Lola) and that it was from Peter Co. He was also told that it was confidential and that only the two of them know. Upon arriving at De Lima's house, Ablen saw Ragos hand over the bag to Dayan with De Lima waiting from the main door. He also saw Ragos entered the house with Dayan and De Lima.

Ragos and Ablen also said they made a second delivery at De Lima's house in mid-December 2012. They said the money this time was placed in a translucent plastic bag and that it was again from Peter Co.

Ragos recanted his testimony in May 2022.

==== Magalong's testimony ====
On the second day of the hearing at the House committee, Secretary Aguirre presented as witness Philippine National Police deputy chief Benjamin Magalong who previously headed the PNP Criminal Investigation and Detection Group (CIDG). In his sworn statement, Magalong bared the details of the aborted Oplan Cronus which was supposed to conduct the prison raid in the Bilibid in 2014. Magalong, who was appointed CIDG chief in December 2013, said he proposed the case operation plan to then Secretary De Lima in May 2014 after his team's findings from recent illegal drug arrests point to the New Bilibid Prison as source. He said that during his first meeting with De Lima at her office in the DOJ, he noticed a diagram of Bilibid personalities written on her white board. He proceeded to inform De Lima that most of the drug pushers they have arrested had dealings with inmates of the Bilibid. Before the meeting ended, Magalong told her "we have to raid NBP because that is where drug trade is happening." The secretary reportedly responded by saying she will call for an inter-agency meeting.

According to Magalong, four "discreet" inter-agency meetings were held to discuss and plan the raid between May and September 2014 which included the top officials of the CIDG, Philippine Drug Enforcement Agency, National Bureau of Investigation, and the Intelligence Service of the Armed Forces of the Philippines (ISAFP). Magalong narrated their first inter-agency meeting with De Lima on his proposed Cronus plan. He said he was surprised to see then Bureau of Corrections officer Rafael Ragos when no BuCor officials were supposed to be at the meeting. After pointing it out to De Lima, he said the secretary also appeared surprised and asked Ragos to leave. In another meeting, then BuCor chief Franklin Bucayu was permitted to sit in where he supposedly tried to discourage the PNP-CIDG from pushing through with the plan saying "You'll have a hard time." In a separate private meeting with Bucayo and then Presidential Anti-Organized Crime Commission (PAOCC) chief Reginald Villasanta, Magalong said Bucayo pleaded him not to carry out the raid saying "Benjie, I'm going to die!" He told Bucayo to talk to the secretary about his concern but that he would still proceed with preparing the operation. At the conclusion of the inter-agency planning, he said he was instructed by De Lima to just wait for the joint Letter of Instruction from her and Secretary of the Interior and Local Government Mar Roxas.

At a rare meeting with the secretary in an event after the planning sessions ended, Magalong said he approached De Lima to follow up on the instruction letter. He told her he was willing to be the ground commander for the operation to raid Bilibid, but the secretary again told him "Let's just wait, Benjie." Months have passed and no letter of instruction arrived. Magalong said he was shocked upon learning De Lima already carried out the Bilibid raid under a different plan (Oplan Galugad) on December 15, 2014. He expressed to the committee his dismay at being left out in the operation he proposed and planned with other PNP-CIDG and PDEA officers. Magalong said those who carried out the December 15 raid were only De Lima, Bucayo, Villasanta and General Marcelo Garbo of ISAFP with units of the PNP SAF and NCRPO (National Capital Region Police Office) as their main force. He added that none of them who were part of the planning in the CIDG and PDEA (except their K-9 dogs) were asked to take part or even advised. Magalong also expressed his frustration after finding out that some of the personalities inside the Bilibid were not included in the transfer to the NBI detention. Under the Cronus plan, he said the CIDG and PNP were supposed to raid one part of the prison controlled by Herbert Colanggo, while the other area controlled by Jaybee Sebastian would be raided by the PDEA and NBI. The high profile convicts would have also been brought and isolated in either Palawan or Zamboanga. He said none of them were implemented.

==== Sanchez's testimony ====
Presidential Security Guard Joenel Sanchez, who was assigned as security aide of then Justice Secretary Leila de Lima for five years, testified before the House Committee of Justice on October 6, 2016. In his testimony, Sanchez claimed that De Lima indeed had an affair with Ronnie Dayan, who was accused of receiving bribes from drug lords in the Bilibid. He also claimed that the former justice secretary and her driver had mobile phone recordings of their sexual acts which he and other security aides have personally seen and that their relationship ended in May 2015 when another close-in security aide, Warren Cristobal, replaced Dayan as head of her security team.

On accusations by inmate Herbert Colanggo of serving as a bagman for De Lima, Sanchez claimed that he did know his manager Renante Diaz through his colleague Vic Mercado. While he denied that he received any money from Colanggo, Sanchez admitted that he often delivered Colanggo's "letter requests" and concert invites to De Lima. He also admitted to receiving a total of ₱15,000 from Renante Diaz in three instances.

==== Sebastian's testimony ====
On October 10, 2016, Jaybee Sebastian testified before the House Committee on Justice two weeks after he was injured in the 2016 New Bilibid Prison riot. A key witness in the Bilibid drug trade who was allegedly the most influential inmate during the previous administration due to his links to the former Justice Secretary Leila de Lima, Sebastian denied De Lima's earlier claim that he was forced to testify in the committee or that he was working as a government asset of the present administration. He claimed he was actually stabbed inside the Bilibid by inmates connected to De Lima, one of whom he identified as convict ex-Chief Inspector Clarence Dongail, to prevent him from testifying before the House Committee. In his testimony after being granted an immunity from suit by the House Speaker, Sebastian claims De Lima was the drug protector in the Bilibid and that he did raise funds to help bankroll her senatorial bid for the May 2016 Senate elections. He said he had given a total of ₱10 million to De Lima mostly through her security aide, Joenel Sanchez, whom he also claimed was romantically linked to the former Justice secretary. He went on to describe De Lima's relationship with Sanchez whom he saw were holding hands in the Bilibid and whose term of endearment for each other was "Sweetie." He claimed to have spoken with De Lima around twelve times during this whole transaction and that his first drug money amounting to ₱2 million was remitted to Sanchez right after the December 2014 Bilibid raid. In his first phone call to De Lima after the raid, Sebastian recalled asking the secretary if she already received the "gift." The secretary allegedly replied "Yes, Jaybee. Merry Christmas." In January 2015, Sebastian said he personally gave another ₱2 million to De Lima herself at the office of Bureau of Corrections chief Franklin Bucayu where he was told by De Lima to just leave the money as Sanchez was not around. Between March and May 2015, Sebastian claimed he was able to raise another ₱6 million drug money and gave it to Sanchez at his Bilibid TV3 office. He said the stash of money composed of ₱1,000 bills, were placed in paper bags.

Sebastian confessed to the Committee that the millions of pesos he raised for De Lima was sourced entirely from the illegal drug trade. When asked by Compostela Valley Representative Peter Gonzaga about the role of Leila de Lima in the Bilibid trade, he said she was more of a protector than a conspirator in the drug trade. He added that De Lima was "aware that the source of money originated from drugs. We don't have any other source." Sebastian also explained that the illegal drug trade in the New Bilibid Prison had become so rampant that inmates exchange ₱50 million to ₱100 million a day in illegal transactions right inside the national prison. Towards the end of the hearing, Sebastian said he was willing to undergo a lie detector test to prove his claims regarding the illegal drug trade at the Bilibid Prison.

==== Dayan's testimony ====
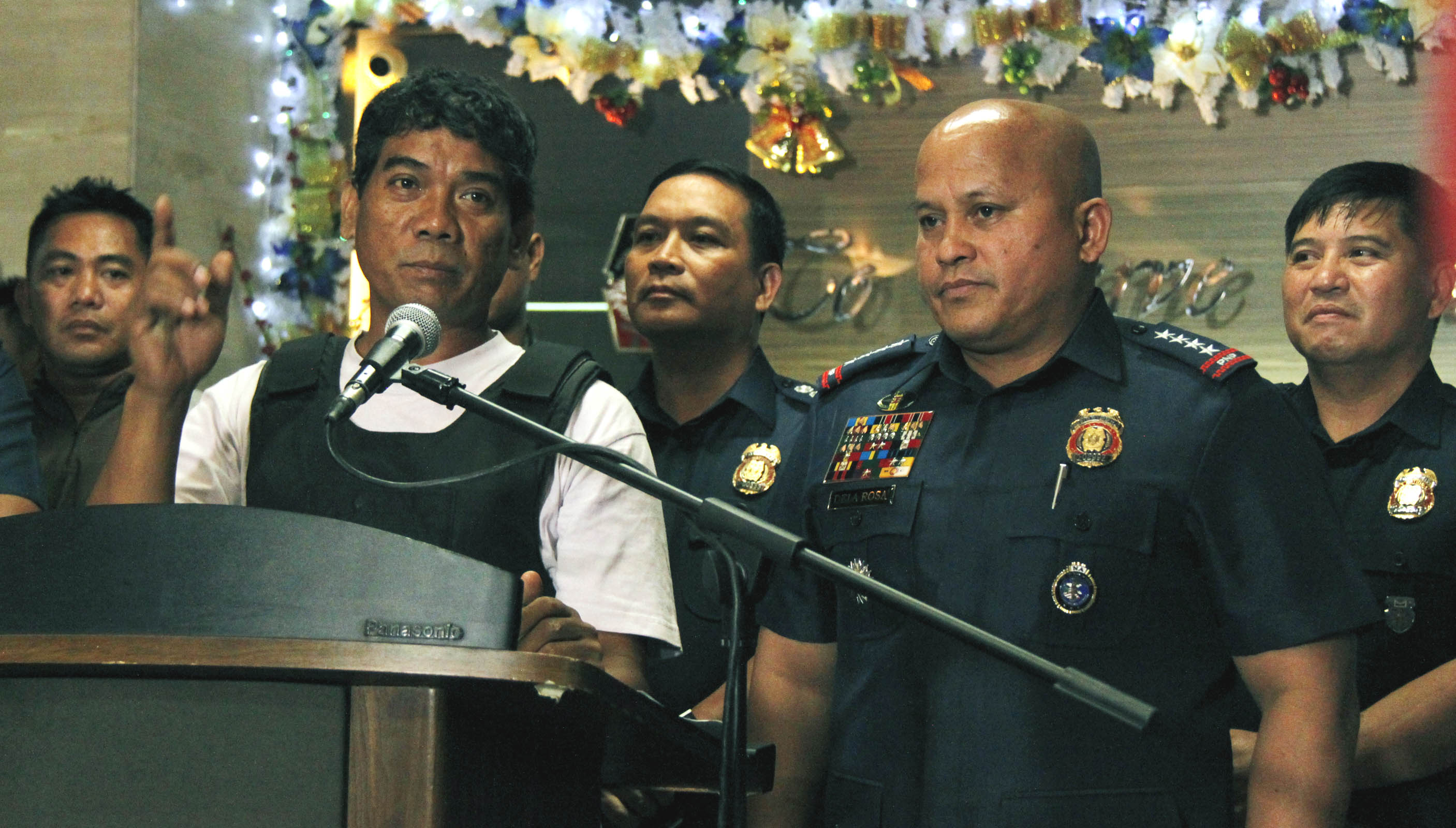
Ronnie Dayan at a press conference with PNP Chief Ronald dela Rosa following his arrest

The House Committee on Justice resumed its probe on the Bilibid drug trade after the arrest of Ronnie Dayan, De Lima's former driver, bodyguard and lover, on November 22, 2016 in San Juan, La Union. The House of Representatives has ordered Dayan's arrest since October 10, 2016 after he was cited in contempt for failing to appear in the October 6th hearing where he has been implicated by witnesses as De Lima's bagman in the Bilibid drug trade. On November 24, 2016, during the resumption of the Bilibid probe at the House Committee on Justice, Dayan explained his decision to hide and not appear before the House Committee. He said he was following Senator Leila de Lima's advise not to show up in the House hearing. His daughter, Hanna Mae, was then presented to confirm his claim. She showed to the committee members the two Viber messages sent on October 1 by De Lima, whom she called "Tita Lei" (Aunt Lei), which she saved in her smartphone. It read "Please tell (Dayan) to go into hiding in the mean time. This is all Speaker Alvarez's fault and dictated by Digong (President Duterte)." She went on to say "They will only feast on him (Dayan), and me and him, if he appears in the hearing." Hanna Mae also presented De Lima's message sent later that day when she asked if her father will get arrested if he does not show up in the hearing. The senator responded "Isn't he really hiding in the first place?"

In his four-page affidavit which he said he was not forced to execute nor was he rewarded for by the government, Ronnie Dayan admitted his relationship with De Lima and narrated his experience working for the former Justice secretary. He said their 7-year relationship started in 2007, two to three months after he was hired as driver and bodyguard in De Lima's law firm in Quezon City. He said De Lima was aware that he was married since 1991 and that he had kids. He also claimed that De Lima's oldest son knew about their relationship. He said they were together when she moved to the Commission on Human Rights in 2008 and started living in with her in Parañaque when she transferred to the Department of Justice in 2010. Dayan also admitted that the money to build his house in Urbiztondo, Pangasinan came from De Lima in 2007, ₱120,000 for the lot and ₱2 million for the house.

As close-in security of De Lima, Dayan narrated his duties at the Bilibid prison. He said he accompanied De Lima inside the maximum security compound several times but that he was eventually replaced by Joenel Sanchez and other Presidential Security Guards from Malacañang Palace. On accusations by then Bureau of Corrections chief Rafael Ragos of receiving ₱5 million in drug money on behalf of De Lima, Dayan denied getting such amount for himself, but admitted there were two occasions when he saw Ragos hand over an envelope and a plastic bag, which he thought contained a box of shoes, to the Justice secretary De Lima. He said Ragos used him as a bridge to De Lima for his promotion in the Bureau of Corrections. Dayan however denied knowing any of the Bilibid inmates or receiving any money from them.

On accusations by self-confessed drug lord Kerwin Espinosa during a parallel Senate Committee on Justice probe on the Death of Rolando Espinosa the day before that he received his millions of drug money on behalf of De Lima, Dayan confessed that he did receive those money from Espinosa on five separate occasions in 2014. The money amounting to ₱8 million that Kerwin claimed was for De Lima's 2016 senatorial bid, was disbursed in different tranches to Dayan. Dayan claimed that while he thought Kerwin was an engineer who was one of De Lima's campaign donors as what he had been told, he did meet with Kerwin for the first delivery in August 2014 at the parking lot of the SM Mall of Asia in Pasay. He said Kerwin approached him in his car with a paper bag and said, "This is for Ma'am." They met again in October 2014 and two times in November 2014 at the same place. Dayan said he was always alone whenever he would meet with Kerwin and that he automatically handed them over to De Lima at her house and straight in her own room, in secret. Despite the discrepancy in the dates of their meetings, Dayan also confirmed Kerwin's testimony that they had met in Burnham Park in Baguio with Leila de Lima before the elections. He said he received the money from Kerwin after this meeting at the parking lot of the Alexandria Residence where Kerwin was staying.

== Reaction ==
Vice President Leni Robredo criticized President Duterte's tirade against party mate Senator Leila de Lima. In a statement released by the Liberal Party, the party stressed that the senator should be given support and not be condemned or disrespected. Robredo urged the government to "stick to issues" as "personal attacks don't help."

The Catholic Bishops' Conference of the Philippines also came to Senator Leila de Lima's defense and expressed alarm over people's reaction to the public shaming by Duterte. CBCP Public Affairs executive secretary Fr. Jerome Secillano gave this reaction after the President called de Lima "immoral" for her relationship with her married driver and alleged Bilibid drug money collector. He said "It’s as if what the President did was perfectly fine. When Mr. Duterte himself was called names by his detractors, people came to his defense and bullied his critics."

Senate President Aquilino Pimentel III said Congress should respect Senator Leila de Lima's decision not to attend the House investigation and cited inter-parliamentary courtesy extended to members of both Houses. Earlier, Pimentel rejected calls for a Senate probe saying "we have no business investigating anybody in the Senate" unless an actual complaint or resolution is filed calling for an investigation of any one of its members.

Former President and Deputy Speaker Gloria Macapagal Arroyo expressed her support for the congressional probe on the Bilibid drug trade. In her first press conference since her release from four years of detention, Arroyo stated that she was "very confident that due process is going to be pursued, unlike the time I was being persecuted."

== See also ==
- Rodrigo Duterte speech during a wake visit to killed-in-action NavForEastMin soldiers, August 2016
- Philippine drug war
