= Louis Ferrante =

American writer and former Gambino family mobster

- Born: May 13, 1969 (age 57); Queens, New York, U.S.
- Occupations: Writer; Gangster
- Writing career
- Notable works: Unlocked: The Life and Crimes of a Mafia Insider; Mob Rules: What the Mafia Can Teach the Legitimate Businessman; The Three Pound Crystal Ball: The Theory of Sleep A.I.D. and the Unconscious Mind's Exclusive Access Into the Corridors of Time. Borgata: Rise of Empire. A History of the American Mafia. Borgata: Clash of Titans
Louis Ferrante
- Allegiance: Gambino crime family

Louis Ferrante (born May 13, 1969) is an American writer who was a former heist expert and Gambino crime family mobster. He spent eight and a half years in prison for heists and hijackings, successfully appealed his conviction and became a bestselling true crime, business, and science writer. He hosts his own show, airing on Discovery International in 195 countries and was nominated for a Grierson Trust Award.

On September 15, 2011, Ferrante spoke at The Economist's Ideas Economy: Human Potential Summit in New York City. On October 21, 2014, Ferrante spoke at the CEO Global Leaders Forum in New York City, hosted by billionaire businessman Leonard Lauder.

== Early life ==
Ferrante was born on May 13, 1969, in Queens, New York, where he was raised. As a teenager, he made his reputation as a gang leader. Ferrante and his gang hijacked delivery trucks all over New York and he soon gained the attention of the Gambino crime family. By his early twenties, Ferrante headed a crew of older armed robbers within the family. Newspaper articles from the 1990s referred to Ferrante as "John Gotti's pal". Another article referred to Ferrante as a "crony of John A. Gotti." On one occasion, Ferrante and his crew flew from New York to California to hold up an armored car. His plans were foiled by the FBI, although there was insufficient evidence to charge Ferrante and his crew with a crime. Around this time, he was suspected of masterminding some of the largest heists in U.S. history.

== Arrests ==
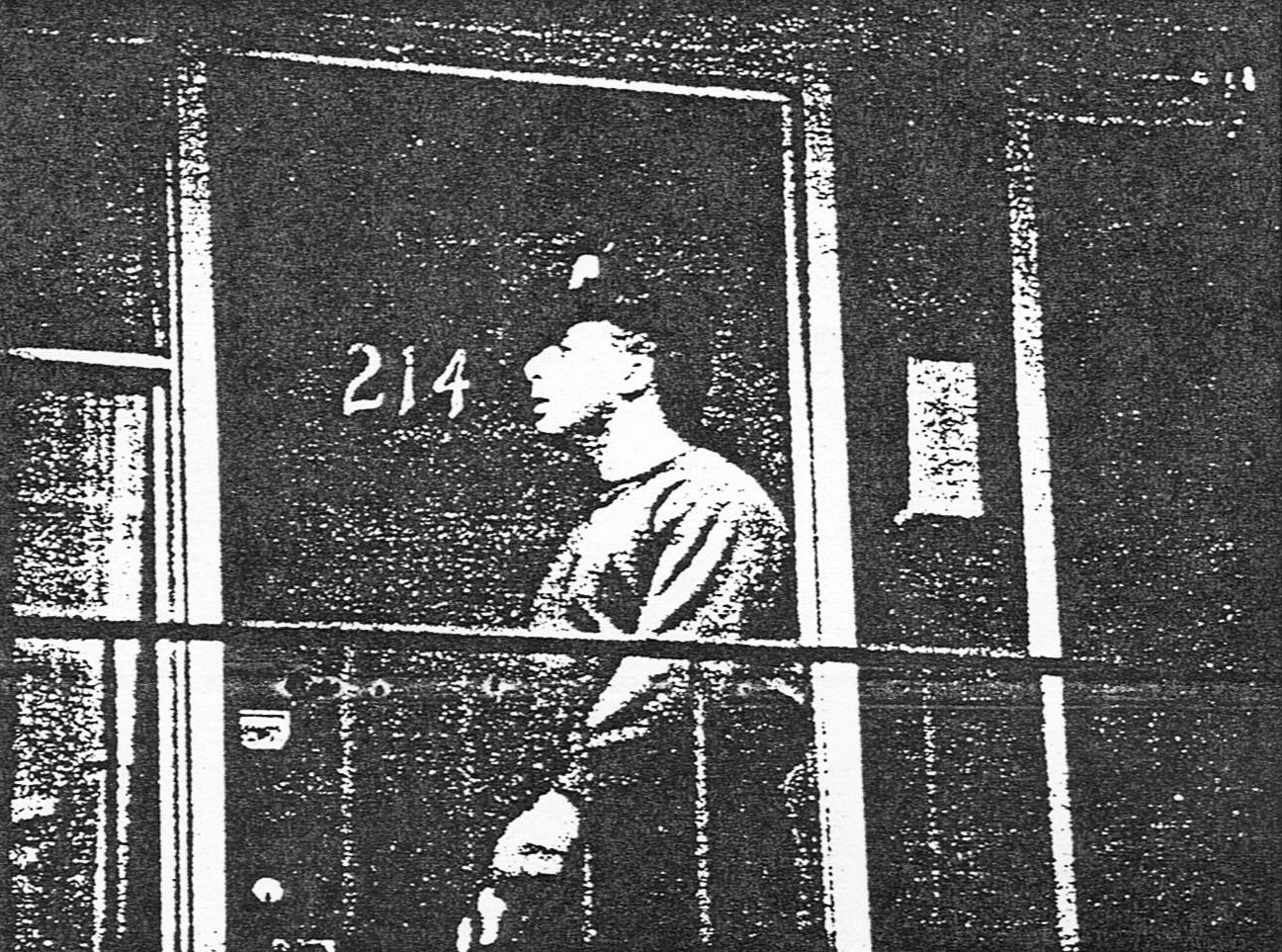
FBI surveillance photo of Louis Ferrante in California, on his way to a meeting with his crew.

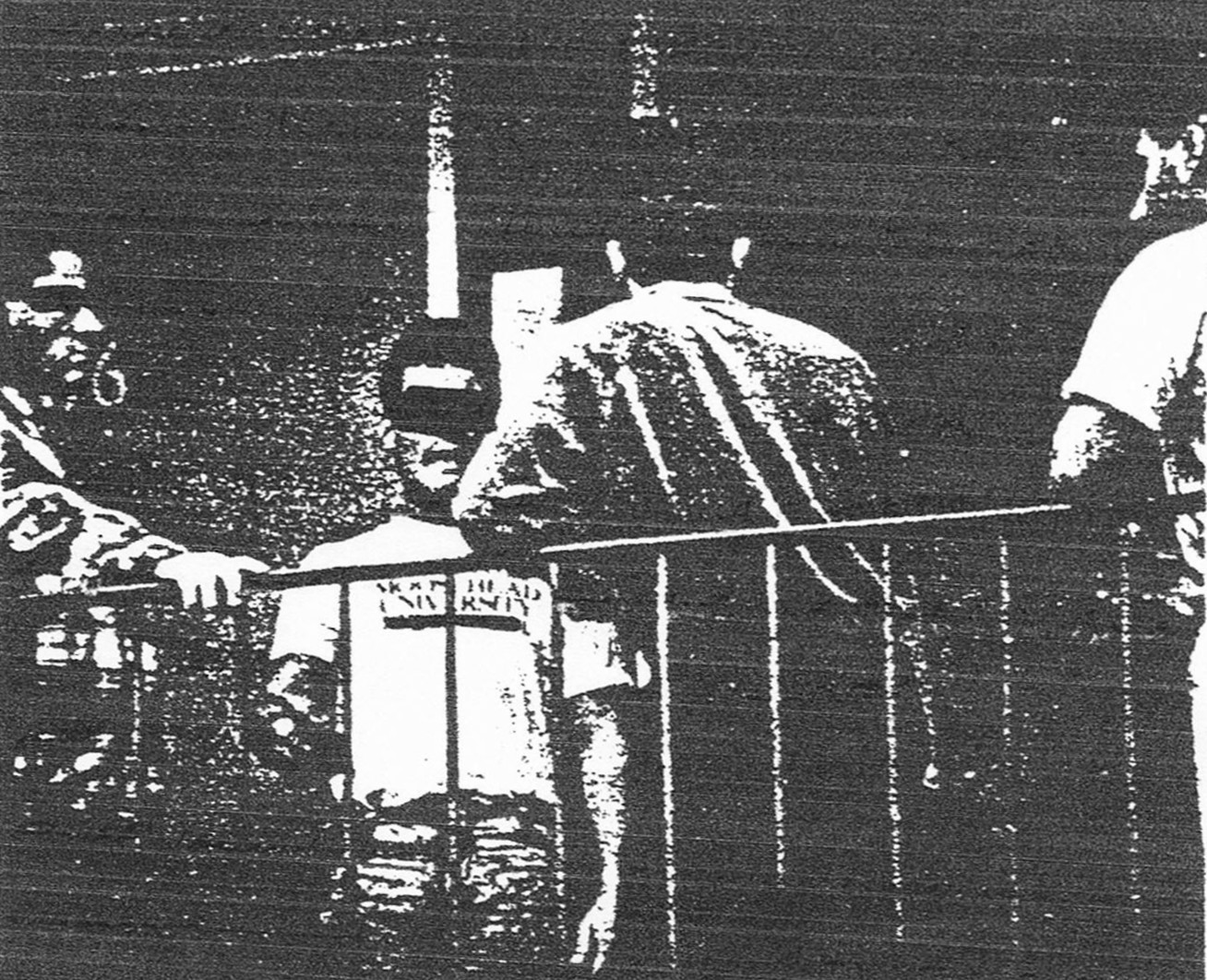
FBI surveillance photo of Ferrante and his crew in California planning an armored truck heist (Ferrante's back is to the camera).

Ferrante was targeted by many investigations. He was eventually indicted by the FBI, the United States Secret Service, and the Nassau County Organized Crime Task Force.

The main witness against Ferrante entered the Witness Protection program. Another informant against Ferrante was William Degel, now the host of Restaurant Stakeout on Food Network. By 1994, and facing a life sentence in prison, Ferrante wrote and distributed a rap song defending crime boss John Gotti. Ferrante hired controversial civil rights attorney William Kunstler to defend him. Ferrante has appeared in at least one biography based on the life of William Kunstler. During the trial, Kunstler claimed that Ferrante's song aggravated law enforcement agencies who had convicted Gotti and that the massive resources used to indict Ferrante multiple times were part of a government vendetta. Ferrante's defense was defeated in court by prosecutors and Ferrante was convicted. In Ferrante's second case, he chose to plead guilty and accept a thirteen-year sentence, with the sentence for his third charge running concurrently with those for his first two charges. Ferrante refused to cooperate with the government and did not inform on former associates of the Gambino family. He was sent to the maximum security prison in Lewisburg, Pennsylvania, to begin his sentence.

== Prison ==
Ferrante has stated he read his first book and became interested in writing during his incarceration at the Lewisburg Penitentiary. He subsequently immersed himself in the study of history, philosophy, science, law, and literature. He also penned a historical novel, Aleesa, set in the antebellum South. Lewisburg Penitentiary was the site of numerous violent race wars, resulting in many violent deaths. In his memoir Unlocked, Ferrante cites his need to shield his mind from the racism around him as the main motivation to write books.

While in prison, Ferrante hired and fired a number of attorneys before successfully appealing his own conviction, a case that is cited in courtrooms across the country. He was released in January 2003, after serving eight and a half years. In addition to law, Ferrante, a former Catholic, studied many religions and chose to convert to Judaism. becoming an observant Jew.

== Books and other writings ==
In the United States, the paperback edition of Ferrante's memoir is titled Unlocked: The Life and Crimes of a Mafia Insider. In the United Kingdom, the memoir is titled Tough Guy: The Life and Crimes of a Mafia Insider. The book has also been translated to Dutch.

Ferrante's second book is titled Mob Rules and is a non-fiction business book. The book was shortlisted for the 800-CEO-Read Awards and is an international bestseller. It has been translated to more than 20 languages.

Ferrante's third book is titled The Three Pound Crystal Ball: The Theory of Sleep A.I.D. and the Unconscious Mind's Exclusive Access Into the Corridors of Time.. It combines physics, psychology, personal experience, extensive research, and neuroscience to establish that the dreaming brain can see nanoseconds into the future. Ferrante conceived this theory while at prison, but developed it after his release. A number of professional scientists have praised the book which follows the lives of Albert Einstein and Sigmund Freud as the work of both men contributed to Ferrante's theory.

Ferrante has also contributed essays to Signed, Your Student: Celebrities Praise the Teachers Who Made Them Who They Are Today, and Bound to Last: 30 Writers on Their Most Cherished Book.

The book, Philosophy for Life and Other Dangerous Situations, by Jules Evans, contains a chapter dedicated to Ferrante titled, "Plutarch and the Art of Heroism."

In January 2023, Ferrante published the first volume of The Borgata Trilogy: A History of the American Mafia. The book came about when Ferrante was invited to Sicily to speak at a literary conference arranged by the German media conglomerate Axel Springer SE. While there, Ferrante met and befriended publishing tycoon, George Weidenfeld, Baron Weidenfeld, who asked Ferrante to write a history of the American mafia.

== United Kingdom ==
Ferrante has visited numerous United Kingdom prisons in an effort to help British prison inmates. As a result of his voluntary work, he received the Celebrity Reading Hero Award, presented to him at 10 Downing Street. He has been a guest on numerous BBC Radio and television programs and has appeared as a guest on the world-renowned news program BBC HARDTalk. Ferrante was also nominated for the Grierson Trust Award, which is considered by many the United Kingdom's most prestigious documentary award; the list of nominees includes David Attenborough.

== Television ==
Ferrante is an award-nominated television host, who also works behind the camera. He is co-creator and executive producer for the television series, The Diamond Collar which aired on Oprah Winfrey's OWN Network on early 2014. Ferrante appeared with actors Al Pacino and James Caan and with director Francis Ford Coppola in the anniversary documentary, The Godfather Legacy.

== Inside the Gangsters' Code ==
Ferrante's television series, Inside the Gangsters' Code premiered on February 27, 2013. Each hour-long episode follows Ferrante as he explores different gang cultures around the world. Inside the Gangsters' Code aired on Discovery Channel in over 195 countries and in multiple languages. Ferrante wrote, hosted, narrated, and co-produced the series.

=== The Philippines ===
The 2013 episode "The Commandos" which exposed the luxurious prison cells owned by gang leaders controlling the Philippines' largest maximum security prison became the subject of a drug trafficking and bribery scandal and investigation at the House of Representatives of the Philippines.

Philippine President Rodrigo Duterte used the episode as a propaganda tool to gain and maintain power in the country. Time Magazine's World Desk interviewed Ferrante and covered the story on August 10, 2017.

== Awards and nominations ==
Ferrante received the U.K. Celebrity Reading Hero Award, which was presented to him by Sarah Brown, wife of British Prime Minister Gordon Brown, in 2009.

Ferrante's second book Mob Rules was a 1-800-CEO-READ 2011 Business Book Award nominee, and was one of Forbes magazine columnist Marc Kramer's World's Best Business Books.

In 2013, Ferrante made the final shortlist of nominees for the Grierson Trust Documentary Television Awards in the United Kingdom. Ferrante was nominated for Documentary Presenter of the Year for his show Inside the Gangsters' Code.

== Bibliography ==
- Ferrante, Louis (2024). Borgata: Rise of Empire: A History of the American Mafia. ISBN 978-1639366019
- Ferrante, Louis (2011). Mob Rules: What the Mafia Can Teach the Legitimate Businessman. ISBN 978-1-59184-398-6.
- Ferrante, Louis (2015). The Three Pound Crystal Ball: The Theory of Sleep A.I.D. and the Unconscious Mind's Exclusive Access Into the Corridors of Time. ISBN 978-0-692-43908-1.
- Ferrante, Louis (2009). Unlocked: The Life and Crimes of a Mafia Insider. ISBN 978-0-06-113386-2.
- Holbert, Holly M., editor. (2010). Signed, Your Student: Celebrities Praise the Teachers Who Made Them Who They Are Today. ISBN 978-1-60714-121-1.
- Langum, David J. (1999). William M. Kunstler: The Most Hated Lawyer in America. ISBN 0-8147-5150-4.
- Manning, Sean, editor (2010). Bound to Last: 30 Writers on Their Most Cherished Book. ISBN 978-0-306-81921-6.

== Radio Interviews ==
- The Bob Edwards Show (23 February 2009)
- The Leonard Lopate Show: "Mafia Soldier Converts to Orthodox Judaism" (26 March 2008)
