= Manila City Jail =

Jail in Manila

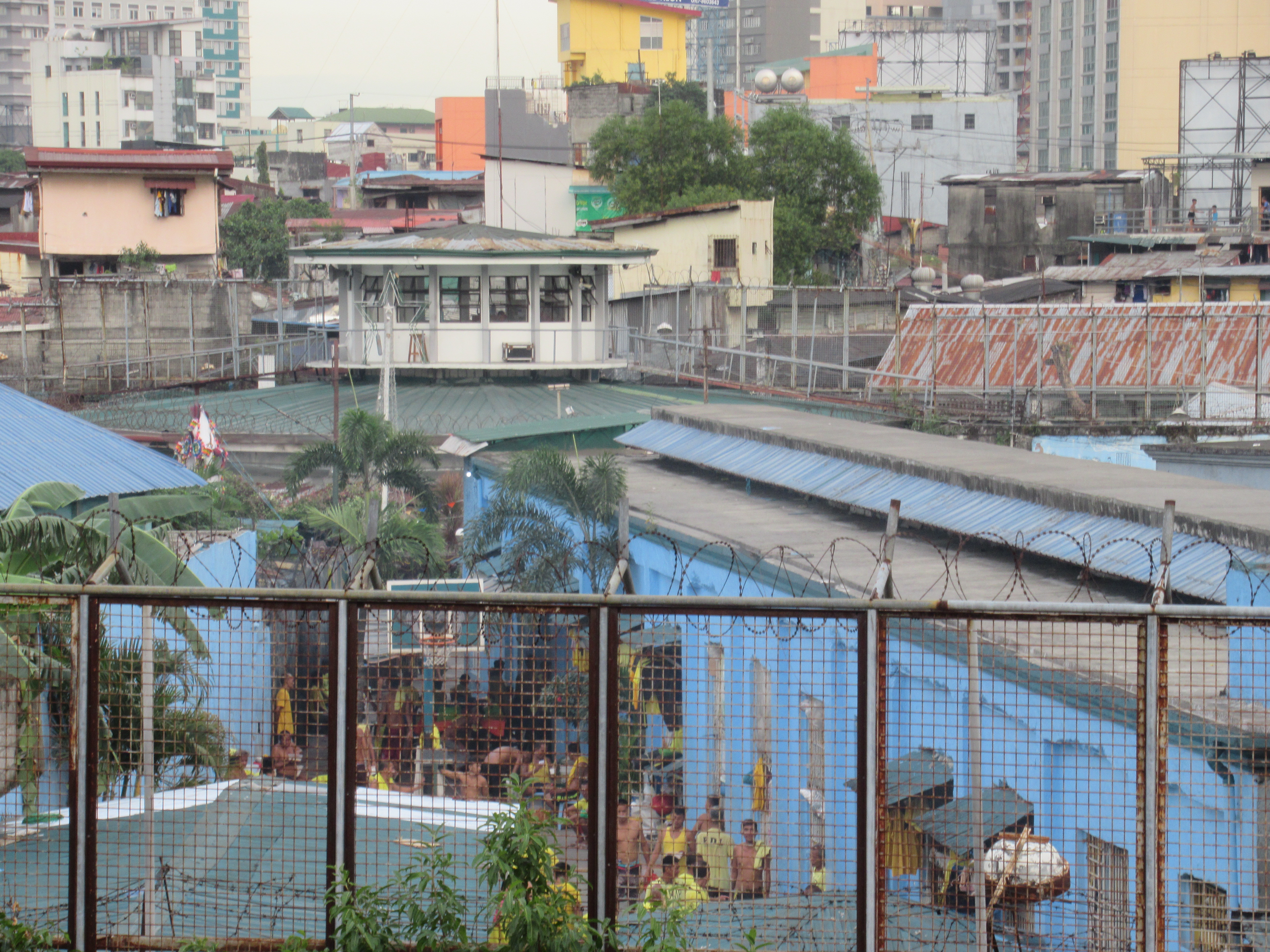
- An aerial view of the Manila City Jail
- Interactive map of Manila City Jail
- Location: 851 Oroquieta Road, Santa Cruz; 14°36′17.48″N 120°59′1.13″E
- Status: Operational
- Capacity: 1,100
- Population: 4,800 (2020)
- Managed by: Bureau of Jail Management and Penology

The Manila City Jail, popularly known as Old Bilibid Prison, is a detention center in Manila, Philippines. It is one of the most overcrowded jails in the world.

== History ==
=== 19th and 20th centuries ===
The Old Bilibid Prison, then known as Carcel y Presidio Correccional (Spanish, "Correctional Jail and Military Prison") occupied a rectangular piece of land that was part of the Mayhaligue Estate in the heart of Manila. The old prison was established by the Spanish colonial government on June 25, 1865, via royal decree. It was divided into two sections: the carcel (jail), which could accommodate 600 inmates, and the presidio (prison), which could hold 527 prisoners.

In October 1936, the Commonwealth of the Philippines allocated 1 million Philippine pesos to build a new prison in Muntinlupa on 551 hectares (1,360 acres) of land, in an area that was considered at that time to be remote. Construction began the same year.

In 1940, the prisoners, equipment and facilities were transferred from Old Bilibid to the new prison, which was named the New Bilibid Prison. The remnants of the old facility became the Manila City Jail.

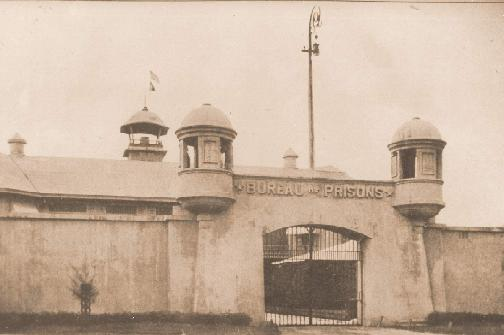
Old Bilibid Prison, c. 1900

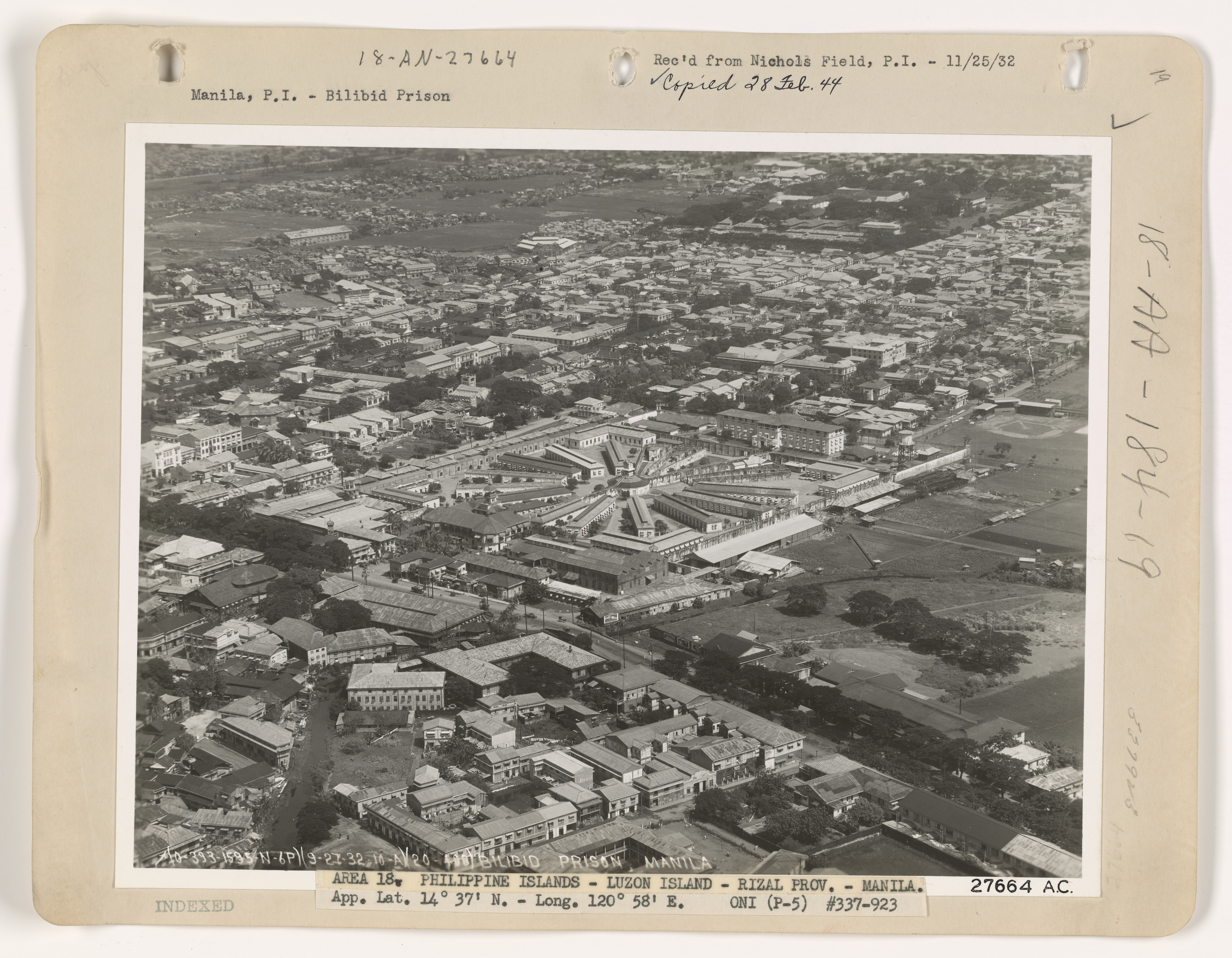
Bilibid Prison from the air, Manila, 1932

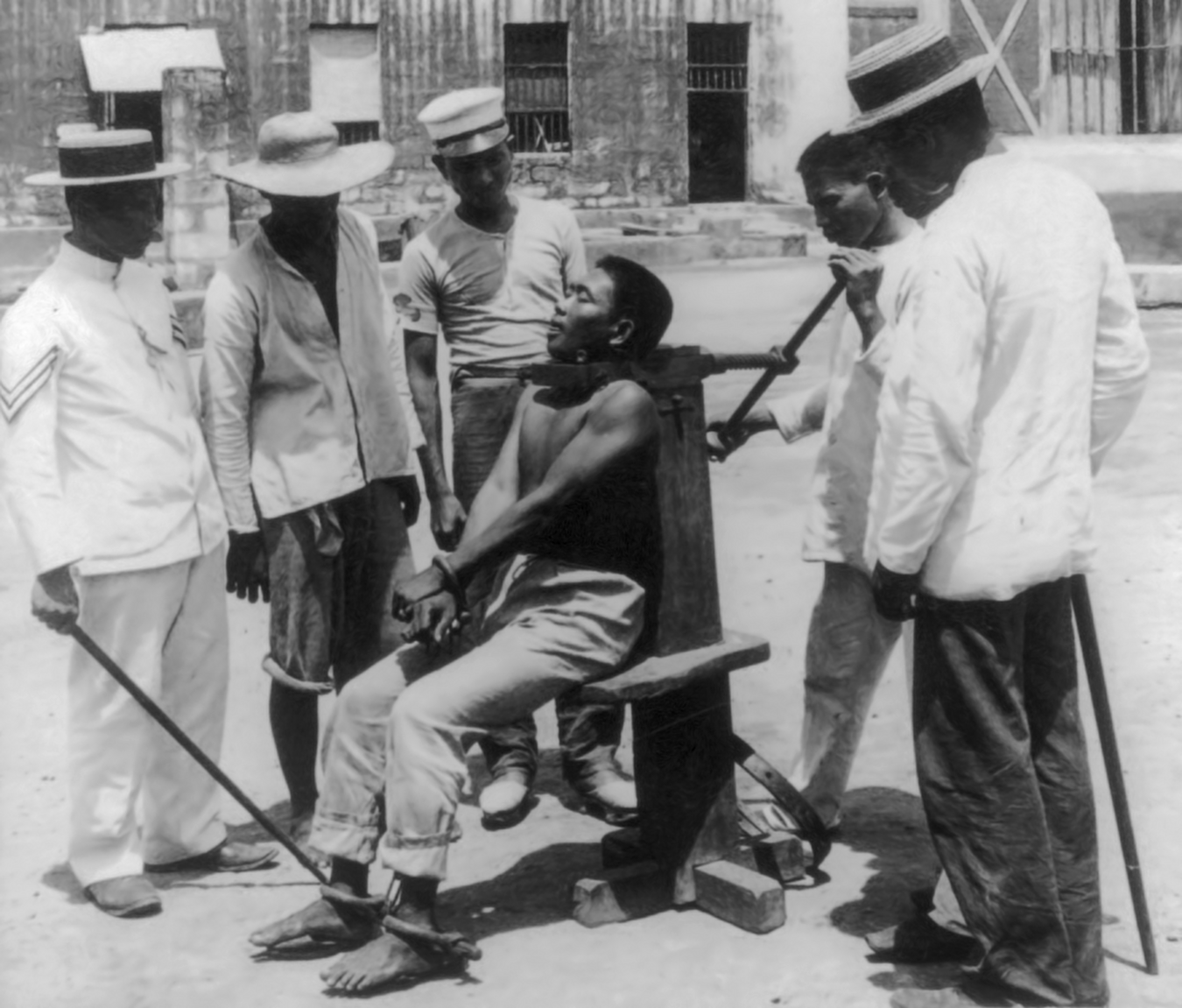
Execution in 1901

=== 21st century ===
The Manila City Jail began overcrowding at the start of the Rodrigo Duterte administration, during the crackdown on drug-related crimes.

In September 2019, two inmates were killed and 32 were injured in a riot that began with an argument between two members of rival gangs over a sleeping space. At the time, the dormitory in the facility where the fight broke out was housing 800 inmates despite having a 200-person capacity.

As the COVID-19 pandemic began to spread in 2020, a spokesperson for the Manila City Jail told ABS-CBN News that the jail was housing over four times its intended capacity, with 4,800 inmates in the facility. The jail began to allow inmates to stay in open spaces within the jail compound to increase physical distancing. Family visits were disallowed, and the jail added ten computers to allow for visits via video chat (e-dalaw). Jail employees were put under lockdown and not allowed to return home beginning March 20, 2020.

An old building previously used to quarantine tuberculosis patients was established as an isolation location for potential COVID-19 patients. The jail spokesperson told ABS-CBN towards the end of March 2020: "As of now, Manila City Jail remains COVID-19 free"; however, ABS-CBN noted that no one at the facility had been tested.

In April 2020, the international non-governmental organisation Human Rights Watch expressed the concern that, due to incomplete reporting by the Philippine government, COVID-19 might be spreading more quickly and widely within Philippine detention centers than it appeared.

== Facility ==
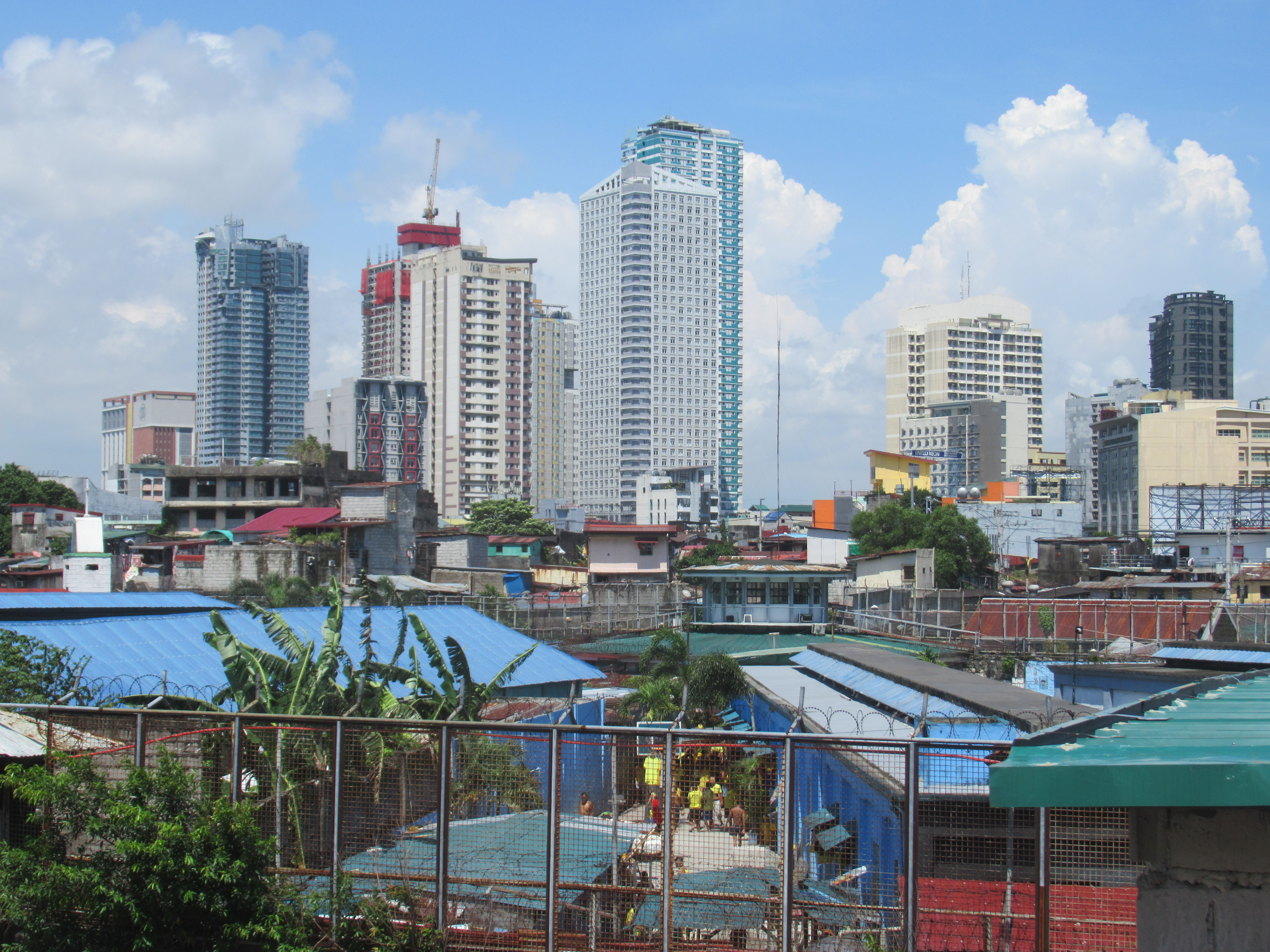
Manila City Jail as seen from the Line 1–Line 2 walkway

The 2.4-hectare (5.9-acre) Manila City Jail has the capacity to house 1,100 inmates.

Operating at an average of 463.6% occupancy, detention centers in the Philippines are the second most overcrowded in the world. As of March 2020, there were 4,800 inmates in the Manila City Jail. In December 2018, the Philippines topped the list of countries with the most overcrowded prisons, with the average facility population exceeding 600% capacity. At that time, the Manila City Jail was housing 6,300 inmates, 90% of whom were pretrial detainees.

In December 2018, the ratio of guards to inmates was 1:200, considerably higher than international guidelines, which recommend a ratio of 1:7. In January 2019, The New York Times reported that during one shift, the ratio was 1:528.

Due to overcrowding, inmates sleep in shifts. Many sleep side by side on all available floor space and stairways, including in hallways and bathrooms. Some do not have room to lay down, and must sleep sitting up. Those who can afford it pay other inmates, who act as dorm leaders, to allow them to sleep in 2-by-2-meter (6 ft 7 in × 6 ft 7 in) cubicles called kubols.

Although gangs are forbidden, officials allow them to operate because they help maintain order. In 2019, a spokesman for the Manila City Jail told The New York Times, "Formally, we don't allow inmates to police other inmates. Informally, we do because of a lack of resources." The gangs self-enforce rules such as those forbidding fighting and approaching other inmates' visitors. They also maintain communal funds and help distribute food, which is scarce within the facility.

== Human rights concerns ==
Leah Armamento, a member of the Philippine government's Commission on Human Rights, has said that the overcrowding in Philippine jails constitutes torture according to the United Nations Subcommittee on Prevention of Torture.

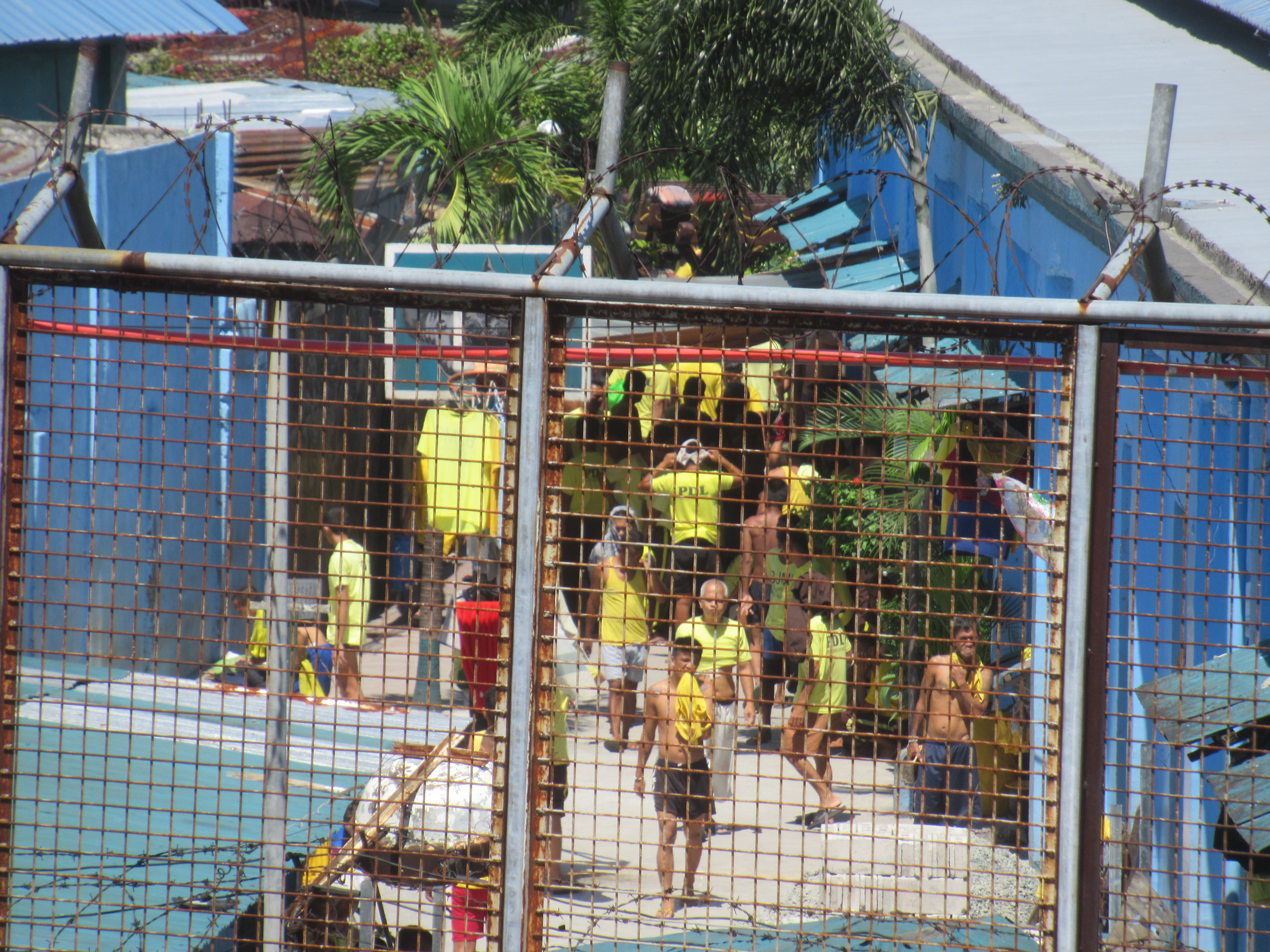
Prisoners in Manila City Jail

In April 2020, the international NGO, Human Rights Watch, raised concerns that COVID-19 was spreading more quickly and widely in Philippine detention centers than reporting suggested, and urged authorities to investigate the causes of deaths in the facilities, reduce prison populations, and implement other measures to prevent the spread of the virus.

Amnesty International raised concerns the same month over the risk of Philippine prisons and detention facilities to become hot-spots of the COVID-19 pandemic. Amnesty urged authorities to release prisoners, saying their health is at immediate risk due to the lack of space, food, water, hygiene and health care. The massive overcrowding is partially due fact that roughly 75% of the detainees are pre-trial or remand prisoners. Many of them are being held without a trial for years, sometimes for minor offences.
