= New Bilibid Prison =

Main insular penitentiary of the Philippines

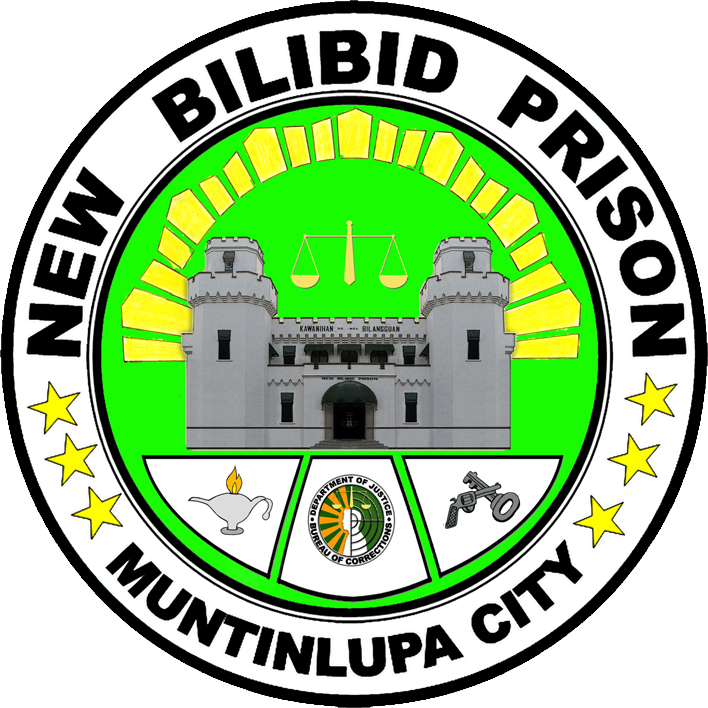
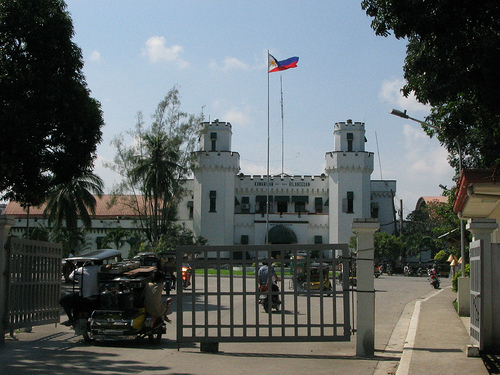
- The façade of the New Bilibid Prison

- Location within Metro Manila Location within Luzon Location within Philippines
- Location: Sampaguita Road, Muntinlupa, Philippines; 14°22′49″N 121°01′43″E
- Status: Operational
- Security class: minimum–maximum
- Capacity: 6,345
- Population: 28,616 (2025)
- Opened: 1940
- Managed by: PNP Special Action Force; Bureau of Corrections
- Director: Gregorio Catapang Jr. (OIC)

The New Bilibid Prison (NBP) in Muntinlupa, Metro Manila, is the main insular prison designed to house the prison population of the Philippines. It is maintained by the Bureau of Corrections (BuCor) under the Department of Justice (DOJ). As of December 2025, the NBP housed 28,616 inmates, nearly five times its intended capacity of 6,345.

By July 2023, the DOJ had suspended admitting new inmates to the prison to address overcrowding and prison gang wars. As such, BuCor Chief Gregorio Catapang Jr. has expressed plans to close down the prison by 2028 and convert it into a commercial hub. An estimated 7,500 minimum- and medium-security inmates is scheduled to be transferred to regional prisons in their respective hometowns and high-risk offenders to a supermax prison soon to open in Sablayan, Occidental Mindoro.

== History ==
The Old Bilibid Prison, then known as Carcel y Presidio Correccional (Spanish, "Correctional Jail and Military Prison") occupied a rectangular piece of land that was part of the Mayhaligue Estate in the heart of Manila. The old prison was established by the Spanish colonial government on June 25, 1865, via royal decree. It was divided into two sections: the Carcel, which could accommodate 600 inmates, and the Presidio, which could hold 527 prisoners.

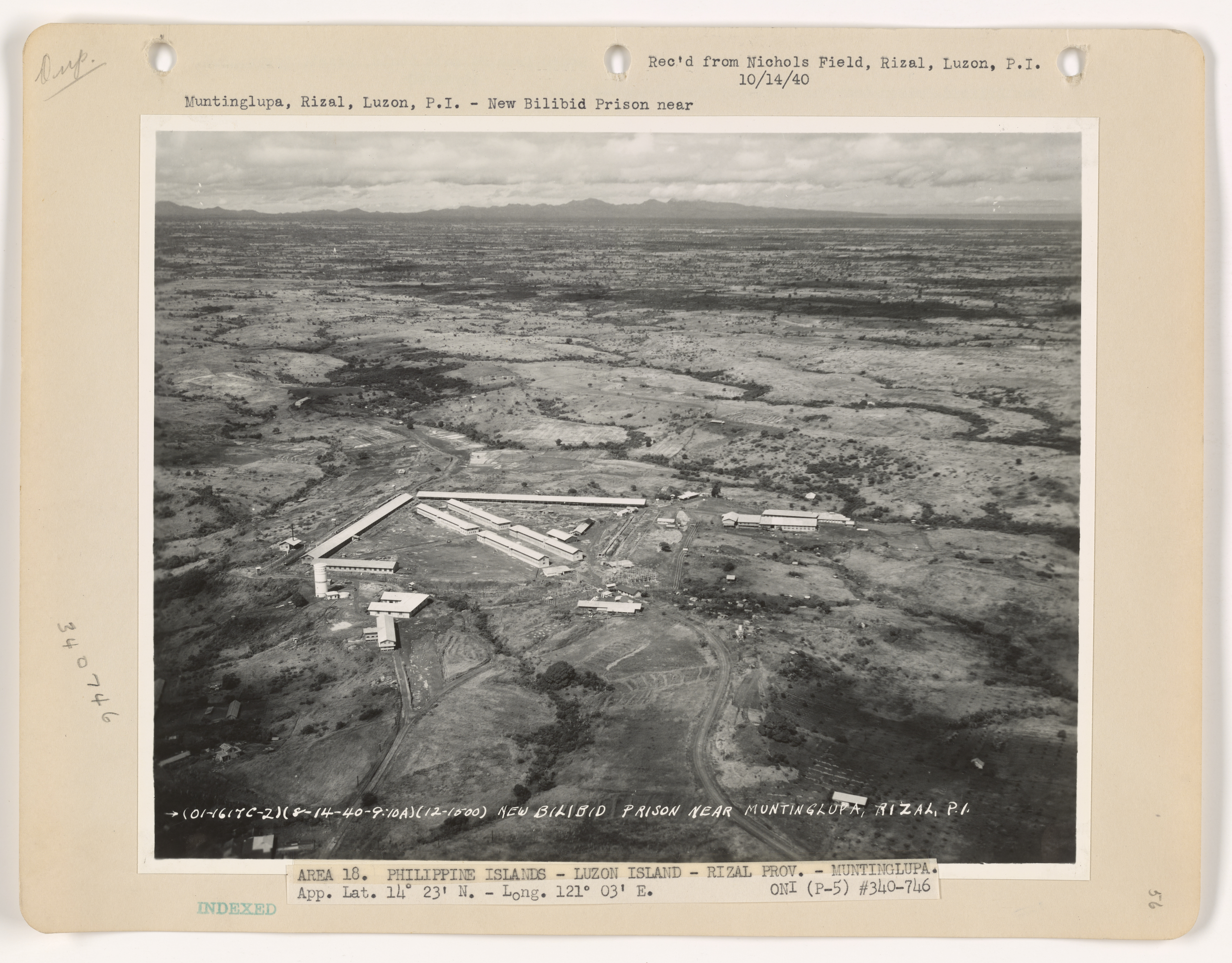
An aerial view of New Bilibid Prison, Muntinlupa, 1940

Due to increasing crime, the Commonwealth government enacted Commonwealth Act No. 67 and a new prison was built in Muntinlupa on a 5,310,872 m^{2} (57,165,750 sq ft) land in an area considered at that time to be "remote". Muntinlupa, then a municipality in the province of Rizal, is several miles southeast of downtown Manila, near the shores of Laguna de Bay.

In 1936, construction began on New Bilibid, with a budget of one million Philippine pesos. In 1940, the prisoners, equipment and facilities were transferred from Old Bilibid to the new prison. The remnants of the old facility was used by the City of Manila as its detention center. In 1941, the new facility was officially named "New Bilibid Prison".

=== World War II ===
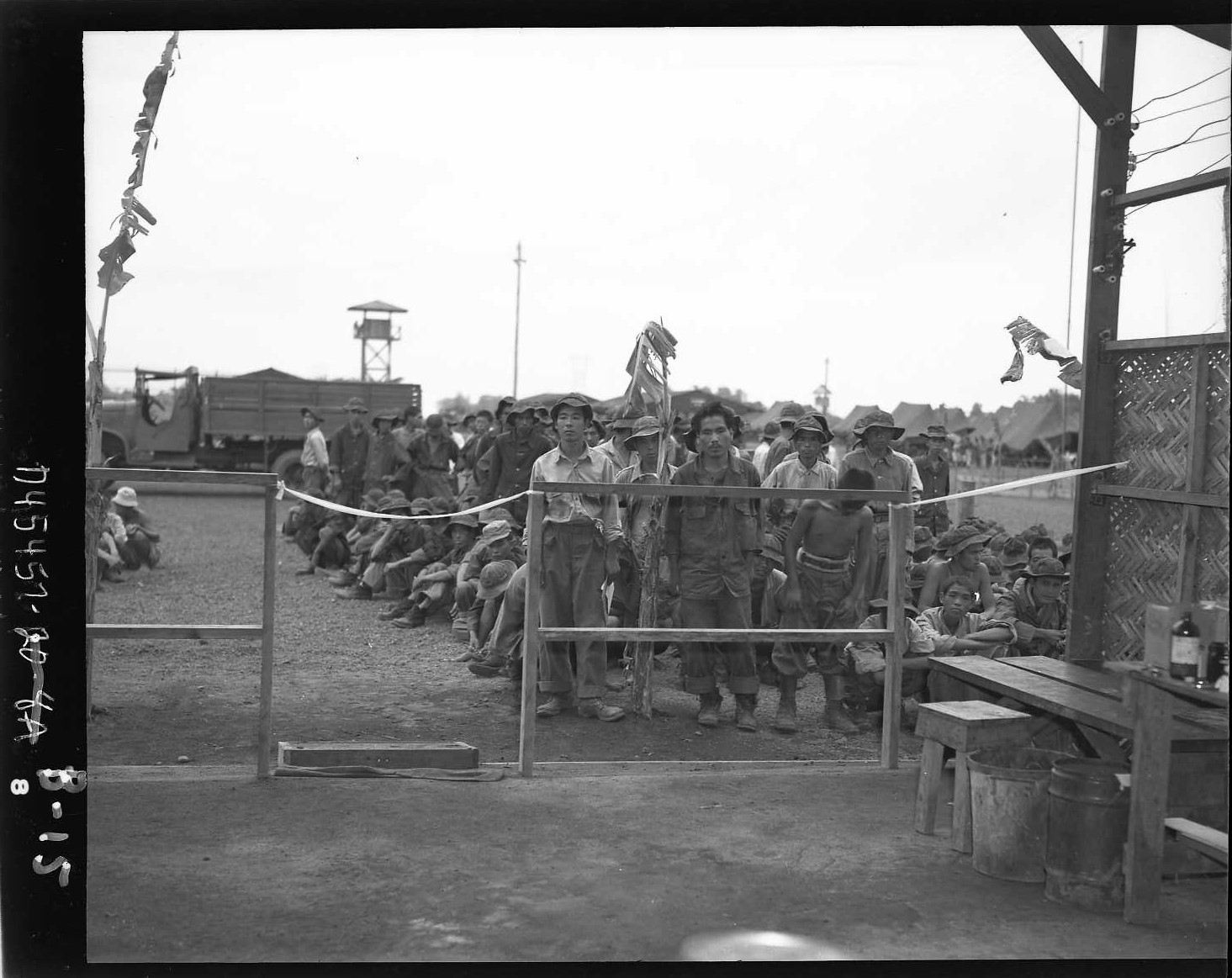
Japanese prisoners of war at the New Bilibid and Luzon POW Camp Number 1

Upon the outbreak of World War II in the Philippines on December 8, 1941 (Manila Time), the Philippine government rounded up all Japanese "enemy aliens" and placed them in various camps. The 4,000 Japanese nationals living in Manila—mostly businessmen and professionals—were interned at the Old Bilibid prison and at the newly-constructed New Bilibid Prison. The prison leadership under Prisons Director Major Eriberto Misa was said to have given compassionate treatment to the internees, with the internees trusting Misa. The regular prisoners tried to contribute to the war effort by donating blood for the soldiers and pledging to fight the Japanese if the government permitted. The security risk prompted the government to decline the offer.

As the Japanese advanced towards Manila, the regular prisoners became troubled by the stories of brutalities done by the Imperial Japanese Army troops in their occupied areas. Thus, on December 27, 1941, the prisoners attempted a mass escape. The escapees burned two buildings in this attempt, and about 3,000 prisoners tried to climb the prison walls. The prison guards fired their guns into the air to deter the prisoners from attempting to escape. The following morning, the escape had been averted. The authorities accounted for all prisoners. Director Misa stated to news outlets that escape attempts never succeeded.

With the impending arrival of the Japanese in Muntinlupa, Misa sent then-NBP Superintendent (later Director of Prisons) Alfredo Bunye and his son Guillermo Misa to meet the Japanese forces in advance and “talk them out of entering the New Bilibid Prisons.” He then waited at the prison gates for whatever fate the invaders would give them. When the Japanese arrived, they let Misa stay in his position and ordered him to free the Japanese interns inside the prison. They stated that Misa would be held responsible for any future jailbreaks.

The Japanese converted the New Bilibid Prison into a prisoner-of-war camp for American and Filipino soldiers. Also imprisoned at the facility were military offenders and captured guerrillas. Director Misa and the prison employees used their positions to secretly help the POWs by giving medical aid to the victims of torture, and allowing their families to visit them and be given food and letters. Later, some prison employees joined the guerrilla movement while continuing their work there. At the same time, Director Misa asserted to the Japanese the necessity of providing supplies for the prisoners, the employees, and the civilian residents living within the prison reservation.

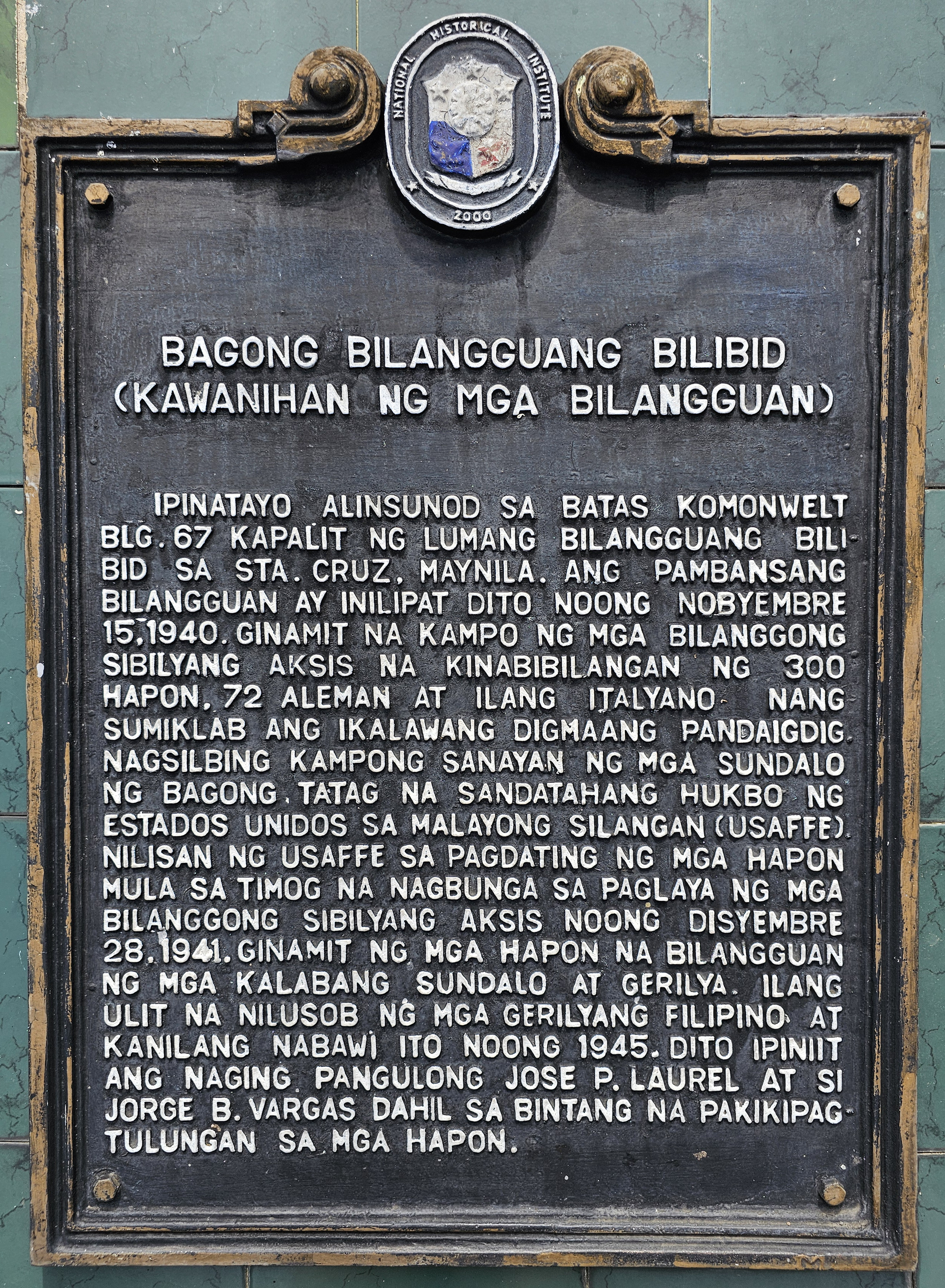
A historical marker installed in 2000 by the National Historical Institute

Director Misa's implicit support for the underground resistance movement encouraged the guerrillas to conduct operations within the prison premises. Initially, the guerrillas conducted intelligence activities inside the prison with the help of their comrades employed by Misa as prison guards. On the night of June 24–25, 1944, the Hunters ROTC guerrillas, personally led by Colonel Terry Adevoso, assaulted the prison and, without firing a gunshot, liberated 30 imprisoned guerrillas and hauled a large stash of weapons and ammunition.

The Japanese wanted to execute Misa for this incident, but President Jose P. Laurel intervened by asserting that the Philippine government was already independent of Japan. He then dismissed Misa and replaced him with Colonel Elias Dequino, who was perceived as a pro-Japanese officer. The prison guards were also replaced by troopers from the Japanese-sponsored Bureau of Constabulary.

Months later, on the night of August 25, 1944, a massive jailbreak of the confined prisoners of war occurred in the prison, led by Lieutenant Colonel Quintin Gellidon of the Fil-American Irregular Troops (FAIT). As the POWs feigned to do a nighttime chorale practice led by Fr. Jaime Neri, the prison lights were turned off, and the escapees ran outside through the prison's southernmost gate, Gate 5. They ran in the direction of Paliparan, Dasmariñas, Cavite, where the Erni's Guerrillas fetched them. Ringleaders Alfonso de la Concepcion and Manuel Fruto were later captured by the Japanese and executed.

Following the Invasion of Lingayen Gulf, the guerrillas enlisted the cooperation of the prison's second in command, Major Adriano Valdez, in securing the welfare of the POWs. This enabled the guerrillas to assist their imprisoned comrades with material and moral assistance. When the US 11th Airborne Division landed in south Luzon in late January 1945, the Japanese became restless and executed selected military prisoners by February 3, 1945. Prison physicians saved some POWs about to be executed by exchanging the names of the condemned with those who had recently died in prison.

On February 5, 1945, the Japanese decided to retreat from the Prison and turned over their control to Dequino. The same day, the guerrillas arrived in Bilibid and started to liberate the POWs inside. Dioquino was arrested for collaboration, and Valdez was appointed Acting Director. The Hunters ROTC Guerrillas and President Quezon's Own Guerrillas were subsequently stationed near the prison complex.

On February 6–7, 1945, the Japanese tried to retake the facility from the east. Learning about this, the guerrillas promptly engaged the Japanese, and killed several enemies. Once the New Bilibid Prison was secured, the prison leadership offered the NBP Infirmary to be used as a field hospital for wounded Filipino and American troops. It functioned this way for the rest of the war, with guerrilla women's auxiliaries serving as nurse aides. Weeks later, the American internees rescued from the Raid on Los Baños were brought to the prison to be given first aid and initial accounting. Misa was eventually reinstated as Prison Director and would hold the position until his death in 1949.

When the war ended, NBP became a POW camp for Japanese soldiers and accused collaborators. President Laurel and his cohorts were also brought to the New Bilibid Prison after their extradition from Sugamo Prison in 1946. The Japanese were imprisoned inside the NBP until their release in 1953, following the executive clemency given by President Elpidio Quirino.

=== Postwar era ===
From the end of World War II until 1953, Japanese war criminals were held within the prison, under Prison Superintendent Alfredo Bunye.

=== Martial Law era ===
The rise of Ferdinand Marcos saw the establishment of the Sampaguita Rehabilitation Center - later named Camp Sampaguita - within the NBP compound. It served both as the headquarters of the 225th Philippine Constabulary Company, and also as a stockade for Political Prisoners. Sampaguita was the southernmost of four major clusters of concentration camps for political prisoners in the Greater Manila Area at the time, Sampaguita being the "S" in "A, B, C, and S" with the other letters representing Camps Aguinaldo ("A"), Bonifacio ("B"), and Crame ("C").

In 1975, Muntinlupa became part of Metro Manila and Bureau of Prisons' division in the town transferred to the new National Capital Region.

=== Contemporary era and present day ===
After the EDSA People Power in 1986, New Bilibid Prison was reorganized after Bureau of Prisons became Bureau of Corrections in 1989 and in 1995, Muntinlupa became a city.

In June 2014, Department of Justice Undersecretary Francisco Baraan III, supervising official on the Bureau of Corrections and the NBP said that the National Penitentiary will be moved to Barangay San Isidro in Laur, Nueva Ecija.

In 2016, the New Bilibid Prison drug trafficking scandal was a criminal investigation and political scandal concerning allegations of government involvement in the Philippines illegal drug trade at the New Bilibid Prison. The allegations were made by President Rodrigo Duterte after announcing that the two top convicted drug lords in the Philippines continued to run their drug rings from inside the national penitentiary, with former administration officials and their local government cohorts as co-conspirators.

In 2022, the relocation of inmates away from the New Bilibid Prison to decongest the facility began. Plans were announced to relocate the medium and maximum security prisons to Occidental Mindoro, and the minimum security inmates to Fort Magsaysay, Nueva Ecija.

== Facilities ==
The New Bilibid Prison has three compounds. The maximum security compound houses inmates serving a prison sentence of more than 20 years. The medium security compound houses those serving less than 20 years. The minimum security compound houses those close to completing their sentence, or who are at least 70 years old.

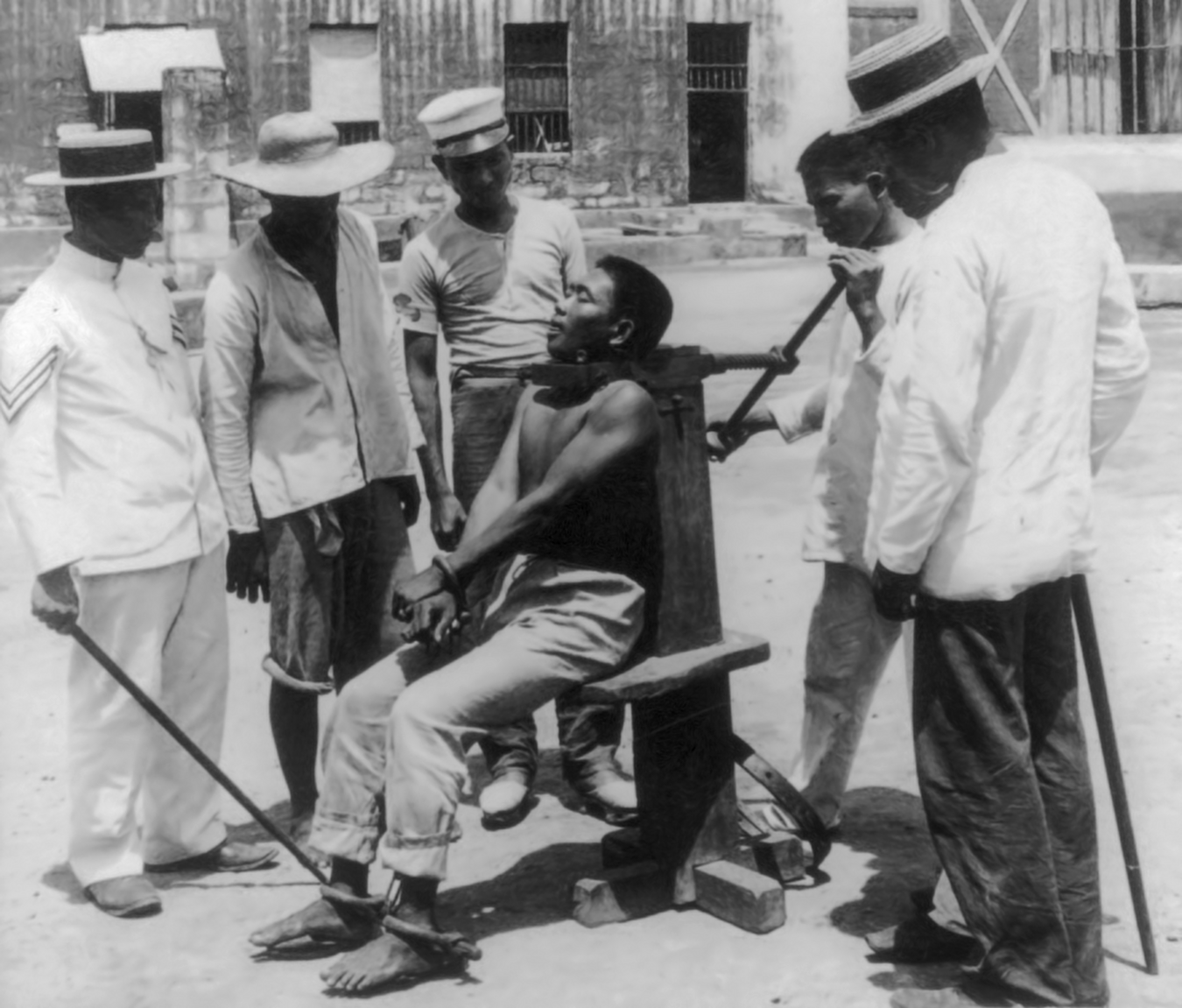
An execution by garrote vil at the Old Bilibid Prison, Manila, Philippines, 1901.

In 1999, Ron Gluckman of Asiaweek wrote that due to the commercial activity and relative freedom of movement in most of the prison, the facility "seems more like a barangay in the Philippines than a prison."

=== Death penalty ===
The execution chamber for inmates sentenced to death by electrocution was in Building 14, within the Maximum Security Compound. As of 2015, it is used to house maximum security prisoners. The former lethal injection chamber is now used as the Bureau of Corrections (BuCor) Museum. Seven men were executed by lethal injection between 1999 and 2000.

Gluckman wrote that the men's death row in Building One, was uncharacteristic of the rest of the prison: "The place reeks of gas burners, sewage, sweat and fear."

=== Recreational facilities ===
The prisoners pass the time in the basketball court in the penitentiary's gymnasium and are also engaged in the production of handicrafts. Various religious denominations are active in prison ministry, with Mass said daily in the prison's Roman Catholic chapel; a locale of the Iglesia ni Cristo is also on the prison grounds. Religious groups, such as the Philippine Jesuit Prison Service, Caritas Manila, Seventh-day Adventist Church, and Amazing Grace Christian Ministries, also extend medical services to prisoners. Research participants agree that the use of inmate leaders is an integral component of prison management in the MSC. Inmates can either assume custodial, administrative, and rehabilitation functions.

=== Educational facilities ===
Educational facilities inside the compound provide elementary education, high school education, vocational training and adult literacy programs. It also provides a Bachelor's Degree in Commerce. The New Bilibid Prison also houses a talipapâ (small wet and flea market) where prisoners can buy daily commodities.

=== Katarungan Village ===
On September 5, 1991, President Corazon C. Aquino issued Presidential Proclamation No. 792, which was amended by Presidential Proclamation No. 120 on December 15, 1992, to the effect that 104.22 hectares (257.5 acres) of land be developed into housing for employees of the Department of Justice and other government agencies. This housing project is known as the Katarungan ("Justice") Village.

== Notable inmates ==
- Alex Bartolome was the last person to be executed in the Philippines. He was put to death by lethal injection at New Bilibid Prison on January 4, 2000.
- Amado V. Hernández is a National Artist of the Philippines for Literature who wrote his masterpieces while imprisoned in the facility.
- Actor Robin Padilla converted to Islam and wed in an Islamic ceremony his first wife, Liezl Sicangco, whilst serving a 2-year prison sentence for illegal weapons possession. He was released in 1998 after having been granted pardon by President Fidel Ramos.
- Claire Phillips, an American spy who was awarded the Medal of Freedom in 1951.
- Former Philippine senator Jovito Salonga was imprisoned by the Kempetai in April 1942, during the onset of the Japanese Occupation in World War II.
- Claudio Teehankee, Jr., the son of former Chief Justice Claudio Teehankee, Sr., who was convicted of murder, homicide and attempted murder on October 6, 1995. He was later released in 2008.
- Hubert Webb, the son of former senator Freddie Webb, was convicted on January 6, 2000, for his alleged role in the June 1991 Vizconde Massacre. The Supreme Court later acquitted Webb on December 14, 2010.
- Antonio Sanchez, former mayor of Calauan, Laguna, who was convicted of rape and homicide on March 14, 1995, for his role in the June 1993 murders of Eileen Sarmenta and Allan Gomez.
- General Tomoyuki Yamashita was the commander of the Japanese Imperial Army in the Philippines in 1944. He was incarcerated while undergoing trial for war crimes committed during the Japanese Occupation and was eventually executed by hanging in Los Baños, Laguna on February 23, 1946.
- Jonel Nuezca, perpetrator of the 2020 Tarlac shooting. He died while imprisoned on November 30, 2021.
- Luis Taruc, a communist who pleaded guilty to a charge of rebellion in 1954 and was sentenced to 12 years imprisonment. He was later sentenced to four life terms for additional crimes. He was pardoned in 1968 by then-President Ferdinand Marcos.

== See also ==
- 2014 New Bilibid Prison raids
- Muntinlupa Sunken Garden
- Naval Base Manila
- Media related to New Bilibid Prison at Wikimedia Commons
