= Lex Talionis Fraternitas =

Filipino law fraternity

- LTF
- Founded: September 29, 1969; 57 years ago San Beda University
- Type: Professional
- Affiliation: Independent
- Status: Active
- Emphasis: Law
- Scope: National (PH)
- Motto: "Loyalty, Service, Excellence, Superiority"
- Colors: Black, Red, Gold
- Chapters: 2
- Nickname: Lex Talionis
- Headquarters: San Beda University; Manila; Philippines

Lex Talionis Fraternitas, Inc. (Sodalitas Ducum Futurorum), commonly known as Lex Talionis, is a fraternal organization of Filipino jurists, legal practitioners, and law students. It was founded on September 29, 1969 at the San Beda College of Law.

== History ==
The Lex Talionis Fraternitas was founded on September 29, 1969 by 35 students of the San Beda College of Law.

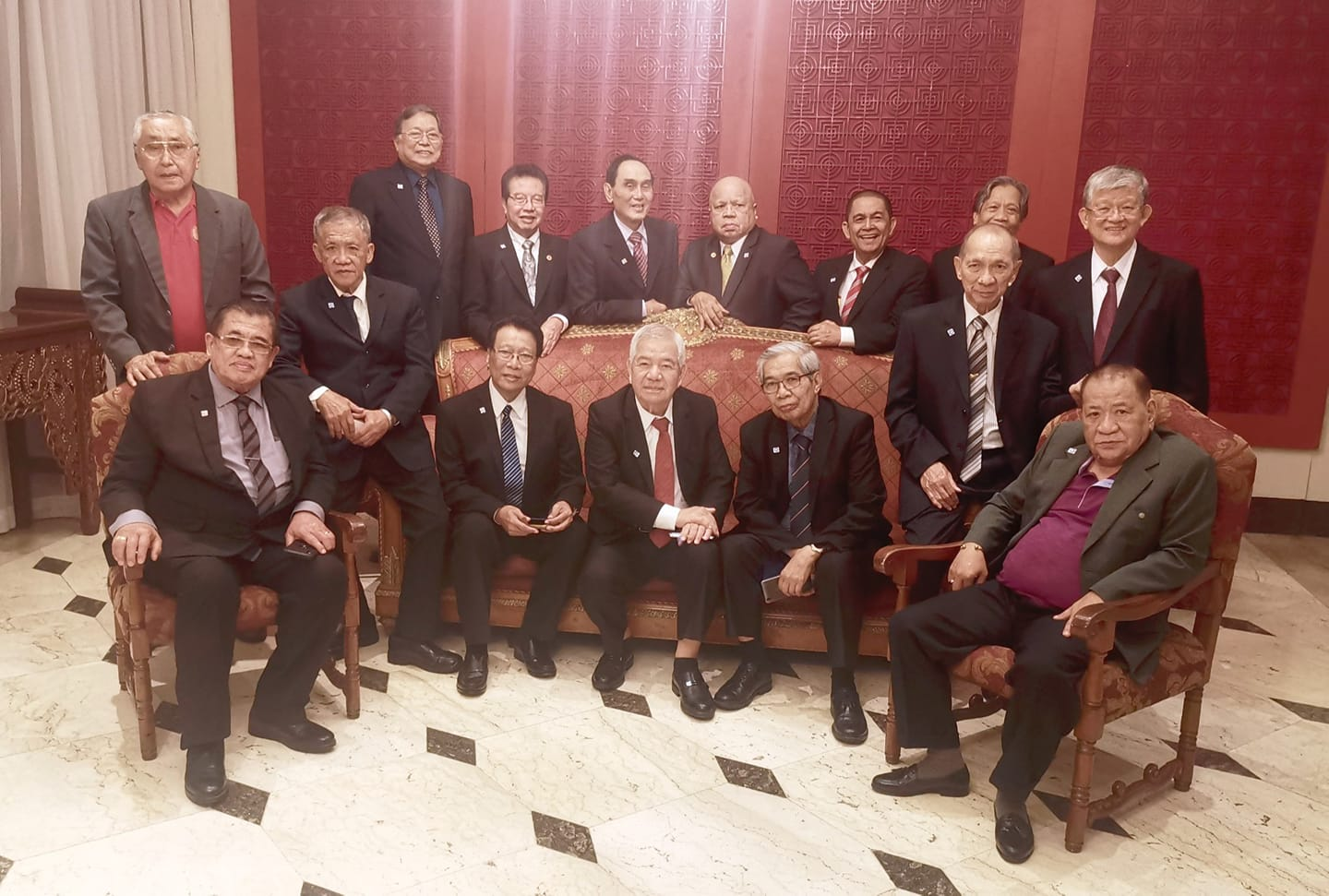
Some of the founders of Lex Talionis Fraternitas. c. 2020

Policarpio Martinez and six other founders were requested to write the draft of the fraternity's constitution and by-laws. After a brief debate, the founders approved the document and sealed it with a sprinkling of beer in the afternoon of September 28, 1969 at the members' favorite bar near San Beda. Martinez was also tasked to take custody of the document.

One of the salient features of the constitution and by-laws was the Troika. It was decreed that the fraternity be ruled by a triumvirate of Grand Judexes. Miguel Soriano, Rizal Guerrero, and Jose Mendoza were unanimously elected and proclaimed as the first Grand Judexes of the Troika of the Lex Talionis Fraternitas. After a year, the triumvirate of Grand Judexes decided to scrap the constitution and by-laws. They also abolished the Troika for faster and easier manageability of the fraternity. Their decision was overwhelmingly endorsed by the members in a meeting called for the purpose. Since then, only a single Grand Judex has been elected for a fixed term.

In 1974, a chapter in Davao City was founded by Joel Babista, Rodrigo Duterte, and Alberto Sipaco Jr. in Ateneo de Davao College of Law. The three are also known as the "Triumvirate." From then on, another Grand Judex was periodically elected by the members from the Ateneo de Davao College of Law. The Grand Judex of the Ateneo de Davao chapter is coequal to that of the Grand Judex of the San Beda chapter. Each Grand Judex exercises absolute authority over their respective chapters.

In 1983, the Securities and Exchange Commission granted the incorporation of the fraternity.

== Symbols ==
The fraternity takes its name from Lex Talionis, which is Latin for "law of retaliation". This concept is derived from the Mosaic law "an eye for an eye; a tooth for a tooth" which is a variation of the original concept promulgated under the Code of Hammurabi.

The secondary name, Sodalitas Ducum Futurorum is Latin for "Solidarity of Future Leaders."

Its colors are black, red, and gold. Its motto is "Loyalty, Service, Excellence, Superiority".

== Membership ==
Recruitment is by invitation only and exclusive to law students enrolled either at the San Beda College of Law or the Ateneo de Davao College of Law.

== Organization ==
The head of the fraternity is called the Grand Judex. He is selected in secret by all members present in an election called for such purpose. Upon its establishment in 1969, the founders agreed that there would be no single Grand Judex during the formative year of the fraternity. Since there was no single Grand Judex, the first batch was headed by three co-equal Grand Judexes collectively called the Troika, composed of Miguel Soriano, Rizal Guerrero, and Jose Mendoza. Later on, Francisco Acosta, was elected as the first Grand Judex.

The Grand Judex is assisted by a Vice Grand Judex, a Judex of Initiation, a Judex of War, a Judex for Academic Operations, an Exchequer, and a Keeper of the Scroll. A senior advisory body, the Council of Grand Judexes, likewise takes an active part in the affairs of the fraternity and acts as the corporate Board of Directors. The council is composed of past Grand Judexes and is headed by a chairman, who acts as the main adviser to the current Grand Judex. The current chairman is Justice Francisco Acosta.

== Chapters ==
Following is a list of Lex Talionis chapters. Active chapters are indicated in bold.

Chapter	Charter date	Institution	Location	Status	Ref.
**San Beda**	September 29, 1969	San Beda College of Law	Manila, Philippines	Active	
**Ateneo de Davao**	1974	Ateneo de Davao University School of Law	Davao City, Philippines	Active	

== Controversies ==
=== Death of Raul Camaligan ===
On September 8, 1991, fraternity neophyte Raul Camaligan died of physical injuries sustained from initiation rites with Lex Talionis. Records of the criminal case show Camaligan, along with three other freshmen from the San Beda College of Law, were recruited with the assurance that hazing would not be required for full membership.

Eight members were indicted for homicide before the Regional Trial Court of Quezon City. Upon re-arraignment, they withdrew their earlier plea of not guilty and pleaded guilty to the lesser offense of reckless imprudence resulting in homicide, effectively lowering the penalty to a minimum of two years and a maximum of four. The Grand Judex at that time, Roger Madamba, while not present during Camaligan's initiation, also admitted to the offense. The members were convicted, but later on applied for and were granted probation.

One of the convicted members, Rufino Quitasol Jr., fled the country without serving his sentence.

In three separate landmark cases, the Supreme Court allowed the members involved in Camaligan's death to take the bar examinations, take the lawyer's oath, and engage in the practice of law. In granting these petitions, the Court took judicial notice of "the general tendency of youth to be rash, temerarious and uncalculating." Additionally, the petitioners submitted evidence that a scholarship foundation in honor of Raul Camaligan was established in 1995 by the fraternity members.

However, in 2017, an investigation by the Philippine Daily Inquirer revealed that no such foundation was ever established and no scholars were registered under its name, according to the records of San Beda College. Gilbert Camaligan, Raul's father, further condemned the fraternity's silence after 25 years, and claimed the organization is "not a good example for young people."

=== Appointments under the Duterte administration ===
During the presidency of Rodrigo Duterte, a disproportionate number of fraternity members were appointed to key government positions, prompting concerns of political favoritism and nepotism from political watchdogs and civil society groups. Within the first year of Duterte's presidency, 25 members of Lex Talionis held key positions in the government, up from just two during the previous administration.

In 2021, Duterte admitted the appointments were motivated by utang na loob (debt of gratitude), but defended his decisions by claiming he has the executive prerogative to appoint people he "know[s] and trust[s], just like other presidents before me."

== Notable members ==
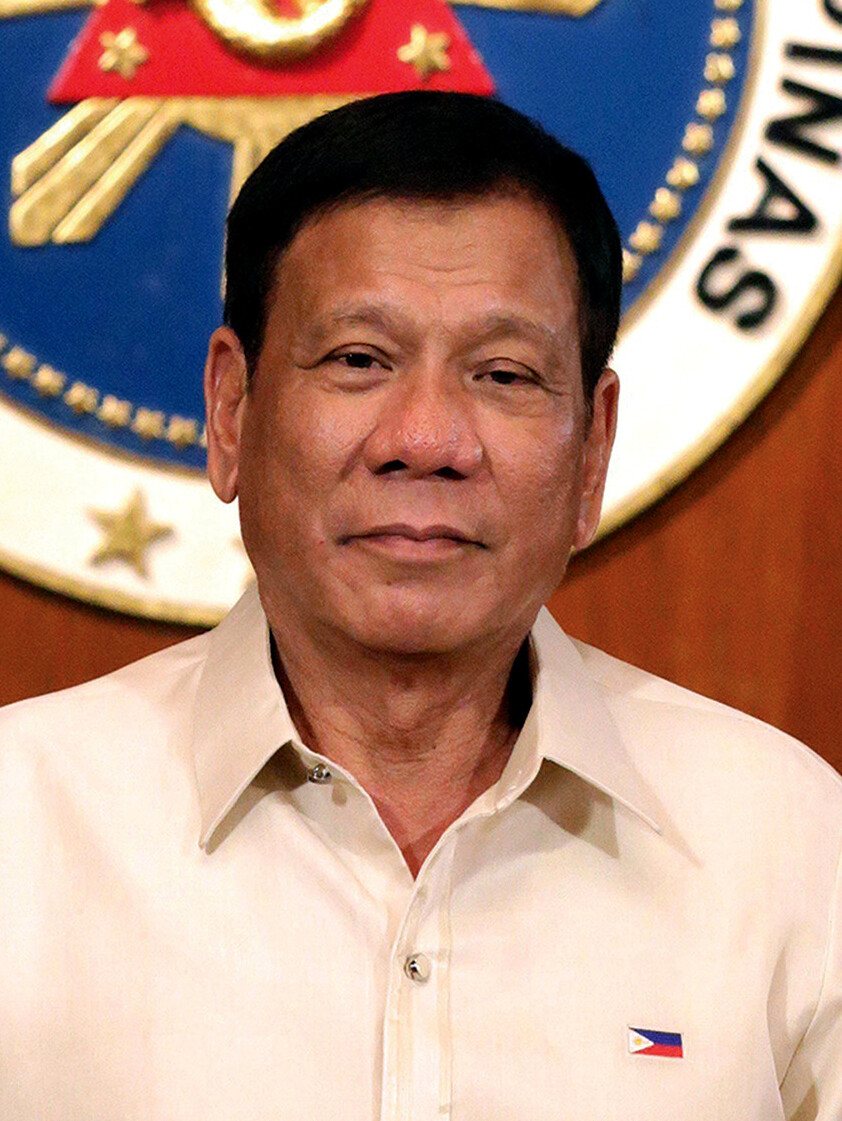
Rodrigo Duterte, 16th President of the Philippines

- Francisco Acosta - Retired Associate Justice of the Court of Appeals of the Philippines
- John Agbayani - Chairperson, Presidential Commission on Good Government
- Vitaliano Aguirre II - Secretary of Justice
- Adnan Alonto - Ambassador to Saudi Arabia for the Philippines
- Arvin Amatorio - Mayor of Bergenfield, New Jersey
- Arthur Amansec - Commissioner, Social Security System
- Emilio B. Aquino - Chairperson of the Securities and Exchange Commission (Philippines)
- Wendel Avisado - Secretary of Budget and Management
- Rey Bulay - Commissioner, Commission on Elections (Philippines)
- Rodrigo Duterte - 16th President of the Philippines
- Erwin M. Enad - Commissioner, Professional Regulation Commission
- Jacinto Fajardo Jr. - Associate Justice of the Court of Appeals of the Philippines
- Florencio Mamauag Jr. - Associate Justice of the Court of Appeals of the Philippines
- Benedicto Malcontento - Prosecutor General, Department of Justice
- Dennis Funa - Commissioner, Insurance Commission
- Dante Gierran - Former NBI Director and Former President and CEO, PhilHealth
- Antonio Kho Jr. - 193rd Associate Justice of the Supreme Court
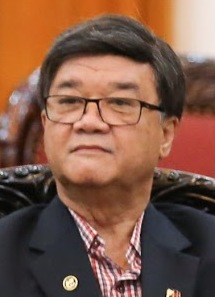
  Vitaliano Aguirre II, former Secretary of Justice
- Tomas F. Lahom III - Director of the Subic Bay Metropolitan Authority
- Abdullah Mama-o - Secretary of the Department of Migrant Workers
- Jose Catral Mendoza - 168th Associate Justice of the Supreme Court
- Bienvenido L. Reyes - 170th Associate Justice of the Supreme Court
- Victor Sepulveda - Prosecutor General, Department of Justice
- Gregory S. Ong - Retired Associate Justice of the Sandiganbayan
- Rodolfo A. Ponferrada - Retired Associate Justice of the Sandiganbayan
- Roy Señeres - Former Congressman and Chairman of the National Labor Relations Commission
- Alberto Sipaco Jr. - CEO and Chairman, Philippine Mining Development Corporation
- Kevin Narce Vivero - Associate Justice of the Sandiganbayan
- Mel John Verzosa - Deputy Administrator, National Tobacco Administration
- Lloyd Christopher Lao - Former Executive Director and Undersecretary, Procurement Service - Department of Budget and Management

== See also ==
- List of fraternities and sororities in the Philippines
