= Samuel Gaerlan =

Filipino judge

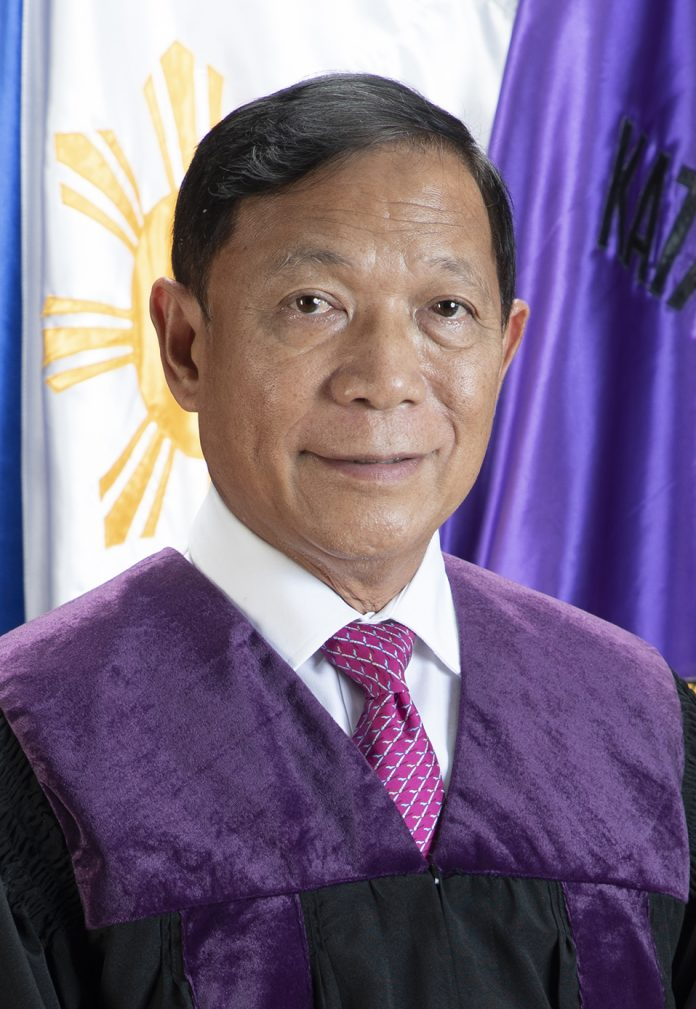
- Gaerlan in December 2022

Associate Justice of the Supreme Court of the Philippines
- Incumbent
- Assumed office January 8, 2020
- Appointed by: Rodrigo Duterte
- Preceded by: Diosdado Peralta

Associate Justice of the Court of Appeals of the Philippines
- In office June 15, 2009 – January 8, 2020
- Appointed by: Gloria Macapagal Arroyo
- Succeeded by: Michael Ong

Personal details
- Born: Samuel Hufano Gaerlan; December 19, 1958 (age 67) San Juan, La Union, Philippines
- Spouse: Ma. Nenette Almoradie
- Children: 2
- Education: San Beda College of Law (LL.B.)

Samuel Hufano Gaerlan (born December 19, 1958) is a Filipino judge who has served as an associate justice of the Supreme Court of the Philippines since 2020. He was appointed by President Rodrigo Duterte to fill the vacated seat of Associate Justice Diosdado Peralta, who was appointed chief justice.

== Life and career ==
Gaerlan was born in San Juan, La Union on December 19, 1958. He obtained his law degree from the San Beda College of Law in 1983 and was admitted to the Philippine Bar in 1984.

He started his legal career as a private practitioner, particularly as lead counsel, executive director and/or Corporate Secretary of various companies and associations. He became Public Attorney II of the Public Attorney's Office from 1990 to 1993. He then served as a Public Attorneys' Office lawyer before becoming a municipal trial court judge in Bangar, La Union from 1993 to 2001 and regional trial court judge in Branch 26 of San Fernando, La Union from 2001 to 2004 and in Branch 92 of Quezon City from 2004 to 2009. He was appointed as a Court of Appeals justice in 2009.

== Associate Justice of the Supreme Court ==
In 2017, Gaerlan was nominated and interviewed for the seat vacated by Jose C. Mendoza, but was not shortlisted. On January 8, 2020, President Rodrigo Duterte chose Gaerlan over five shortlisted candidates and was appointed to the court to fill the seat vacated by Diosdado Peralta.

Legal offices
Preceded by Diosdado Peralta	Associate Justice of the Supreme Court; 2020–present	Incumbent
