= Priscilla Baltazar-Padilla =

188th Associate Justice of the Supreme Court of the Philippines

The Honorable Priscilla Baltazar-Padilla
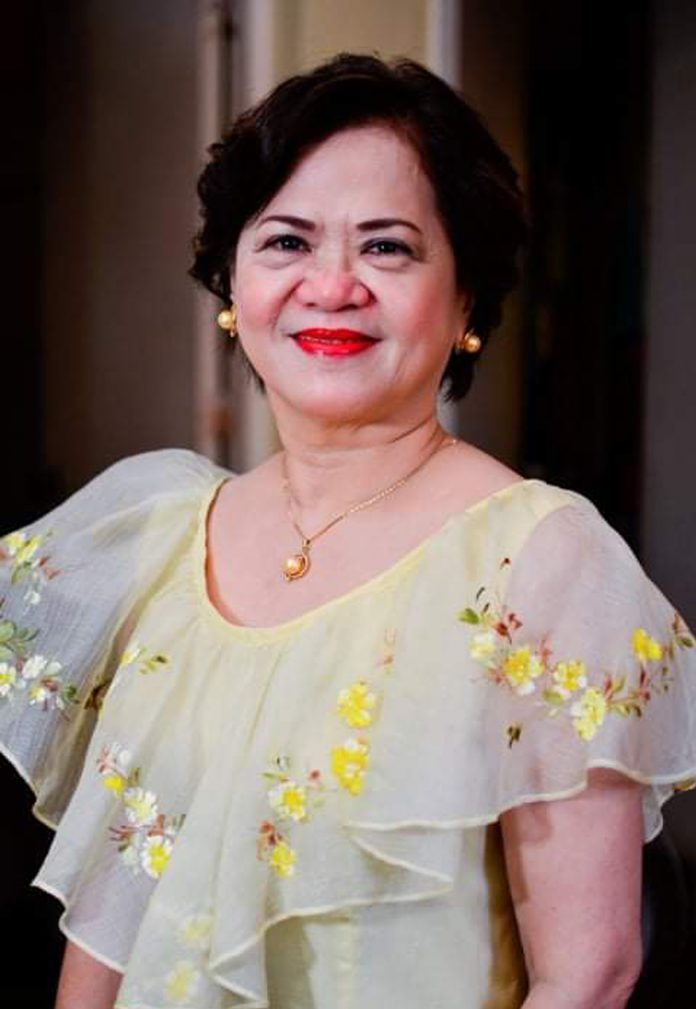

188th Associate Justice of the Supreme Court of the Philippines
- In office July 16, 2020 – November 3, 2020
- Appointed by: Rodrigo Duterte
- Preceded by: Andres Reyes Jr.
- Succeeded by: Jhosep Lopez

Personal details
- Born: Priscilla Joson Baltazar; July 2, 1958 Manila, Philippines
- Died: August 27, 2021 (aged 63) Manila, Philippines

Priscilla Joson Baltazar-Padilla (born Priscilla Joson Baltazar; July 2, 1958 – August 27, 2021) served as the 188th Associate Justice of the Supreme Court of the Philippines in 2020. She was appointed by President Rodrigo Duterte to replace Associate Justice Andres Reyes Jr.

== Education ==
Baltazar-Padilla graduated Magna Cum Laude and at the top of her class in both her Political Science and Bachelor of Laws degrees from the Lyceum of the Philippines University.

While enrolled in the College of Law, she was hired to teach Political Science subjects by her alma mater in 1979. She was tapped to teach in the College of Law after passing the 1984 Bar Examinations where she obtained a weighted average of 90.3%, placing 5th among the successful examinees.

== Judicial career ==
=== Justice of Court of Appeals ===
On May 31, 2006, she was one of the two Judges who were appointed Associate Justice of the Court of Appeals by President Gloria Macapagal Arroyo, the other was Judge Mario Lopez who would also be appointed in the high Tribunal in 2019 by President Rodrigo Duterte.

Baltazar-Padilla was initially stationed in Cebu until her transfer to Manila. She held the position for 14 years until her appointment of the Supreme Court in 2020.

=== Associate Justice of the Supreme Court ===
On July 16, 2020, President Rodrigo Duterte appointed Baltazar-Padilla to be an Associate Justice of the Supreme Court of the Philippines. Padilla filled the post vacated by Supreme Court Associate Justice Andres Reyes Jr. who retired in May. She was chosen out of six other potential candidates, Midas Marquez, Ricardo Rosario, Japar Dimaampao, Jhosep Lopez, Ramon Cruz and Manuel Barrios.

==== Early retirement ====
On the last week of October, Baltazar-Padilla applied for an early retirement. And on November 3, 2020, during the High Tribunal's en banc session, her fellow justices approved her request for early retirement.

== Death ==
Padilla died on August 27, 2021, at the age 63.

Legal offices
Preceded by Andres Reyes Jr.	Associate Justice of the Supreme Court of the Philippines; 2020	Succeeded by Jhosep Lopez
