= Bienvenido Reyes =

Filipino lawyer (born 1947)

The Honorable Bienvenido L. Reyes
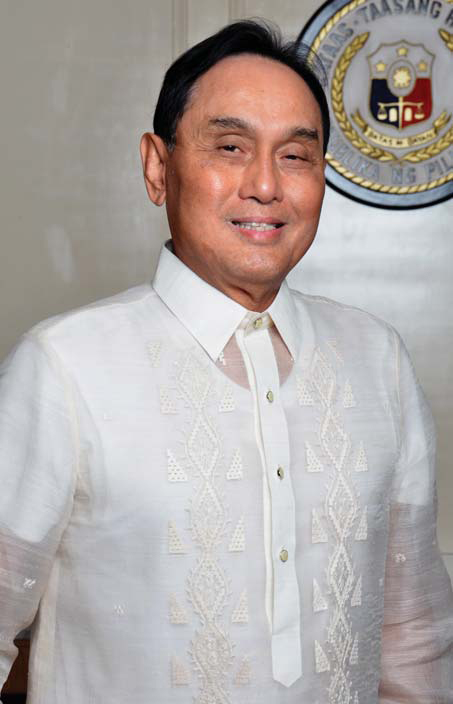

170th Associate Justice of the Supreme Court of the Philippines
- In office August 16, 2011 – July 6, 2017
- Appointed by: Benigno Aquino III
- Preceded by: Antonio Eduardo Nachura
- Succeeded by: Andres B. Reyes, Jr.

Associate Justice of the Philippine Court of Appeals
- In office August 8, 2000 – August 23, 2011
- Appointed by: Joseph Ejercito-Estrada

Personal details
- Born: July 6, 1947 (age 79) Obando, Bulacan
- Spouse: Teresita Jacinta B. Reyes
- Education: San Beda College of Law; University of Santo Tomas
- Affiliation: Lex Talionis Fraternitas

Bienvenido Lorenzo Reyes (born July 6, 1947) is a Filipino lawyer who served as an associate justice of the Supreme Court of the Philippines. He left the Court of Appeals on August 23, 2011 to assume his seat on the Supreme Court.

Reyes administered the oath of his fraternity brother, Rodrigo Duterte as the 16th President of the Philippines on his inauguration rites held at Malacañang Palace on June 30, 2016.

== Legal career ==
After finishing his pre-law at the University of Santo Tomas, Reyes took up his law degree at the San Beda College of Law where he, together with now fellow Supreme Court Justice Jose C. Mendoza, established the law fraternity Lex Talionis Fraternitas. After obtaining a grade of 81.6% in the 1971 Bar exams, Reyes worked as Vice-President for legal and Corporate Affairs of R.C. Silverio Group of Companies from 1975 to 1981. He then founded a Makati-based Law Firm, Reyes Daway Lim Bernardo Lindo and Rosales, in 1982. He acted as Chairman, Director, President and/or Corporate Secretary of various private corporations; the Board Secretary of National Home Mortgage Finance Corporation and Chairman of the Board of Celebrity Sports Plaza.

In July 1990, he became Presiding Judge of the Regional Trial Court of Malabon and was appointed Associate Justice in the Court of Appeals on August 8, 2000. On August 16, 2011, President Benigno Aquino III appointed him as a magistrate of the Supreme Court.

== Awards and Recognitions ==
While treading his way towards his career as a lawyer, Justice Reyes was a recipient of various awards and recognitions from different organizations and institutions. In 1998, he was awarded the Most Outstanding Alumnus by his high school alma mater, Colegio de San Pascual Baylon. Two years later, he was given the Plaque of Distinction for Outstanding Achievement in the Field of Law and Jurisprudence by the Lex Talionis Fraternitas Inc. and a Certificate of Recognition by the Integrated Bar of the Philippines Calmana Chaptern. He was also given a Certificate of Recognition in the field of Law and Jurisprudence by the San Beda College of Law in July 2002. In 2003, he was recipient of Gawad Dangal ng Obando, Natatanging Obandeňo Award for being the Most Outstanding Citizen of Obando, Bulacan in the field of law.

In 2011, he received the following: Gawad Bilang Kasaping Pandangal (IBP Gat Marcelo H. del Pilar Bulacan Chapter); Fraternal Scroll of Distinction (Lex Talionis Fraternitas, Inc.); Pagkilala - Sangguniang Panlalawigan ng Bulacan; and the Outstanding Bedan Law Alumni Award. The most recent award he received is the 2012 Distinguished Bedan Award.

During his stint as Associate Justice of the Court of Appeals, he received a recognition for having achieved Zero Backlog in his docket as of November 2010. Ninety five percent of his decisions which were elevated to the Supreme Court were affirmed. He left the Court of Appeals on August 23, 2011 when he was appointed Associate Justice of the Supreme Court by President Benigno Aquino III with a very clean docket.

== Personal life ==
Reyes was born at Catanghalan, Obando, Bulacan. He is married to Philanthropist Teresita Jacinta Reyes (Archivist at Asian Development Bank) with their two children, Dennis Reyes, and Environmentalist and Businessman Benson Michael Reyes.

Reyes was elected as United Coconut Planters Life Assurance Corporation Chairman on April 26, 2019.

== Sources ==
- Personal Information, J.B.Reyes

Legal offices
Preceded by Antonio Eduardo Nachura	Associate Justice of the Supreme Court; August 16, 2011–July 6, 2017	Succeeded by Andres B. Reyes, Jr.
