= Funa =

Funa may refer to:

- Cyclone Funa, the strongest cyclone of 2008 within the South Pacific
- Dennis B. Funa, a Filipino lawyer
- Funa (gastropod), a genus of sea snails in the family Pseudomelatomidae
- Funa (mountain), the medieval name of Demerdzhi Mountain in the Alushta Municipality, Crimea; see Valley of Ghosts (Crimea)
- Funa District, an area of the city of Kinshasa, Democratic Republic of the Congo
- Funa Futi, an atoll that forms the capital of the island nation of Tuvalu
- Funa-yurei, the ghosts of people who have died at sea
