= Minita Chico-Nazario =

Filipino judge (1939–2022)

The Honorable Minita Chico-Nazario
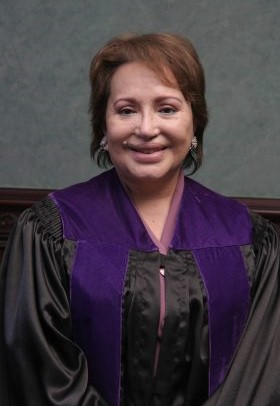

155th Associate Justice of the Supreme Court of the Philippines
- In office February 10, 2004 – December 5, 2009
- Appointed by: Gloria Macapagal Arroyo
- Preceded by: Josue N. Bellosillo
- Succeeded by: Jose C. Mendoza

3rd Presiding Justice of the Sandiganbayan
- In office January 16, 2002 – February 10, 2004
- Appointed by: Gloria Macapagal Arroyo
- Preceded by: Francis Xavier E. Garchitorena
- Succeeded by: Edilberto Sandoval (acting)

Senior Associate Justice of the Sandiganbayan
- In office March 5, 2001 – January 16, 2002
- Preceded by: Cipriano del Rosario
- Succeeded by: Edilberto Sandoval

23rd Associate Justice of the Sandiganbayan
- In office May 10, 1993 – January 16, 2002
- Appointed by: Fidel V. Ramos
- Preceded by: Romulo Quimbo
- Succeeded by: Efren Dela Cruz

Personal details
- Born: December 5, 1939 San Miguel, Bulacan, Philippines
- Died: February 16, 2022 (aged 82)
- Spouse: Rod Nazario

Minita Chico-Nazario (December 5, 1939 – February 16, 2022) was an Associate Justice of the Supreme Court of the Philippines. She was appointed to the court by President Gloria Macapagal Arroyo on February 10, 2004.

== Profile ==
Born in San Miguel, Bulacan, Justice Chico-Nazario was the first female justice in the Sandiganbayan and its first female presiding justice. She was married to Rod Nazario (1935–2009), noted for being the first business manager/promoter of Manny Pacquiao, with whom she had three children: Rhoderick, Rommelious, and Karen.

She finished elementary school at Our Lady of Loreto College, Sampaloc, Manila (1952), and high school at Our Lady of Loreto College (1956). She earned her A.B. at the University of the Philippines (1958).

Her appointment to the Supreme Court was a homecoming of sorts, since she started out as the social secretary of the late Secretary of Justice Juan Liwag after graduating from the University of the Philippines College of Law in 1962. Justice Nazario was appointed Division Clerk of Court of the Sandiganbayan's First Division and was appointed Regional Trial Court Judge of Biñan, Laguna. Likewise, she was a professor of law at the Perpetual Help University in Las Piñas City (1994–1997). Prior to her appointment to the high court, she had more than 40 years of uninterrupted service in government.

Nazario was latterly the president of the Philippine Women Judges Association and dean of the University of Perpetual Help College of Law. She was also the Criminal Law Bar Examiner for the year 2000. Nazario died on February 16, 2022, at the age of 82.

== Some notable opinions ==
- Estrada v. Desierto (2004) — on jurisdiction of Court of Appeals over appeals from Ombudsman decisions
- Nikko Hotel Manila Garden v. Reyes (2005) — on an action for damages filed by comedian Amay Bisaya against Makati hotel
- MMDA v. Garin (2005) — on authority of MMDA to confiscate driver's licenses
- People v. Hon. Tirona (2005) — on right of prosecution to appeal from judgments of acquittal
- People's Journal v. Theonen (2005) – on libel action involving private persons as injured parties
- Province of Rizal v. Executive Secretary (2005) — on closure of San Mateo landfill
- Lambino v. COMELEC (2006) – Dissenting — on people's initiative as a mode to amend the Constitution of the Philippines
- Alvarez v. PICOP (2006) — on conversion of timber license agreements

Legal offices
Preceded by Josue N. Bellosillo	Associate Justice of the Supreme Court; 2004–2009	Succeeded by Jose C. Mendoza
Preceded by Francis Garchitorena	Presiding Justice of the Sandiganbayan; 2002–2004	Succeeded by Edilberto Sandoval (acting)
Preceded by Romulo Quimbo	Associate Justice of the Sandiganbayan; 1993–2002	Succeeded by Efren Dela Cruz
