= Florenz Regalado =

Filipino judge

The Honorable Florenz D. Regalado
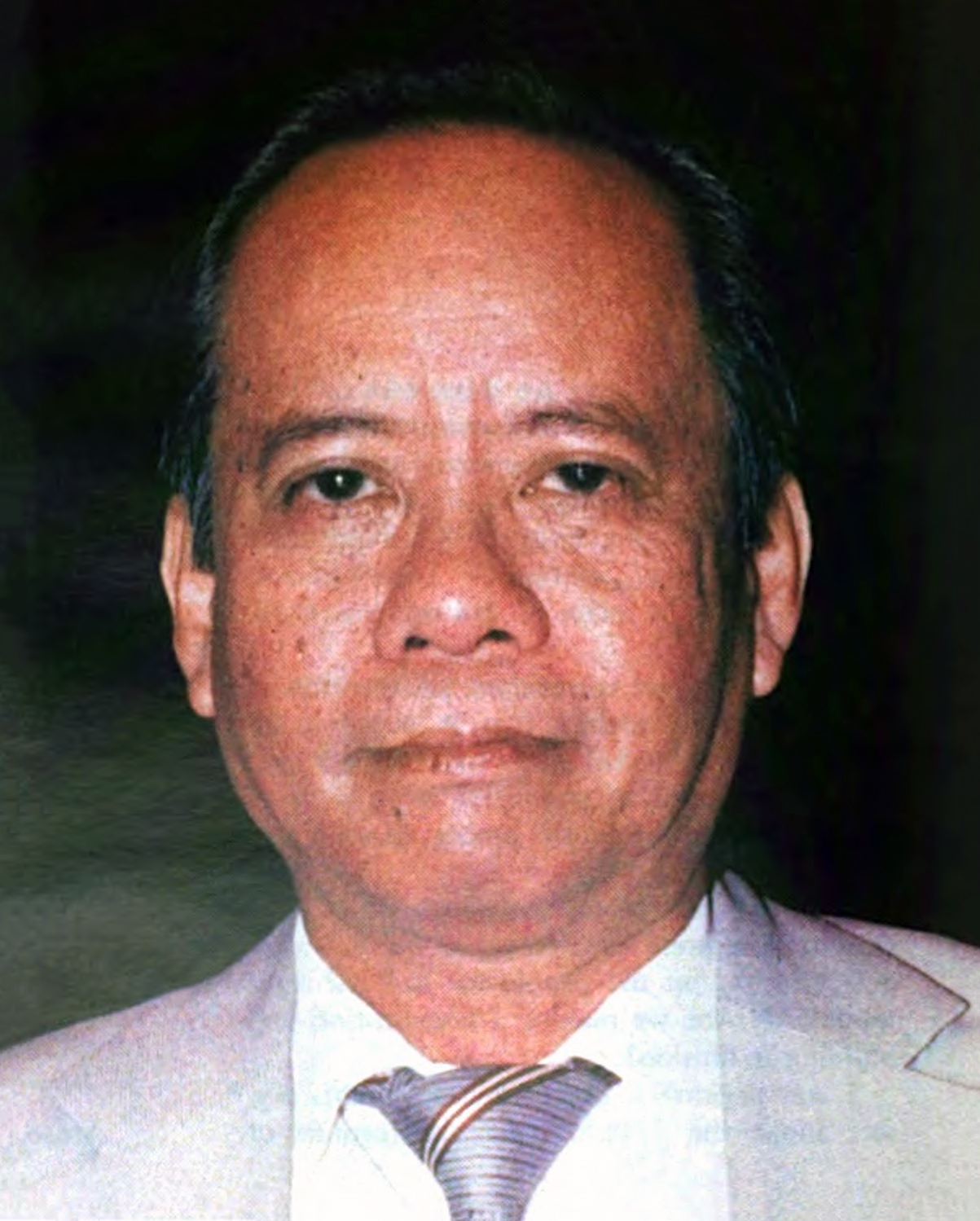
- Official portrait as commissioner of the Philippine Constitutional Commission of 1986

Associate Justice of the Supreme Court of the Philippines
- In office July 29, 1988 – October 13, 1998
- President: Corazon Aquino

Personal details
- Born: October 13, 1928 Concepcion, Iloilo, Philippine Islands
- Died: July 24, 2015 (aged 86) Metro Manila, Philippines
- Cause of death: Lung cancer
- Education: San Beda University; University of Michigan; Far Eastern University
- Occupation: jurist, professor, soldier

Florenz Dolendo Regalado (October 13, 1928 – July 24, 2015) was an associate justice of the Supreme Court of the Philippines, professor, and expert in criminal law in the Philippines. The 14th appointment by President Corazon Aquino, he served from July 29, 1988, to October 13, 1998. Regalado is considered the most influential jurist and writer on remedial law, writing the most complete compendium in one volume as early as 1972. A legendary professor for over 30 years, Regalado became a renowned expert also in criminal law.

== Education and early years ==
Florenz Dolendo Regalado was born on October 13, 1928, in Concepcion, Iloilo.

He finished Mandurriao Elementary School and Jaro Central School, Iloilo City in 1938. He went to Iloilo Provincial High School and took an advanced three-year course because of excellent marks. He finished in 1942.

He graduated Far Eastern University with an Associate in Arts degree in 1949. A year later he entered San Beda College and finished magna cum laude in 1954 at San Beda College of Law, and received his Master of Laws degree from the University of Michigan in 1963 as a De Witt Scholar.

He remains the record holder for the highest average in the Philippine Bar Examinations, with his 1954 mark of 96.7%, where he was awarded the Memorial of Recognition.

Regalado was also a young guerilla in the sixth military district in Panay and was awarded with distinction for his part in WW II. He was involved in multiple missions in Leyte province.

== Legal career ==
Regalado started as technical assistant to the Secretary of Labor from 1955 to 1956. He also worked as the Special Prosecutor for Labor cases at the Department of Justice at the same time.

Before becoming Associate Justice, he served as the Dean of the San Beda College of Law. He also served as Pre-Bar Reviewer in Criminal Law and Remedial Law at the San Beda College of Law from 1958 to 1988, Far Eastern University, Lyceum of the Philippines, Ateneo de Manila University, and as lecturer at the U.P. Law Center from 1976 to 1979.

He was a member of the Philippine Constitutional Commission of 1986 as vice-chairman for the Executive Branch committee which drafted the present Constitution of the Philippines. His jottings on the stages of theft are considered the principal source in current jurisprudence in criminal law.

Regalado was known for his diligence, and when he entered he reduced the 11,000 cases docketed, which included a 1932 case, and brought it down to 4,000 cases by the time he retired.

== Final years and legacy ==
Regalado died on July 24, 2015, in Manila.

The Florenz D. Regalado Memorial Award for the top students was created in his honor.
