= Antonio Kho Jr. =

Filipino judge

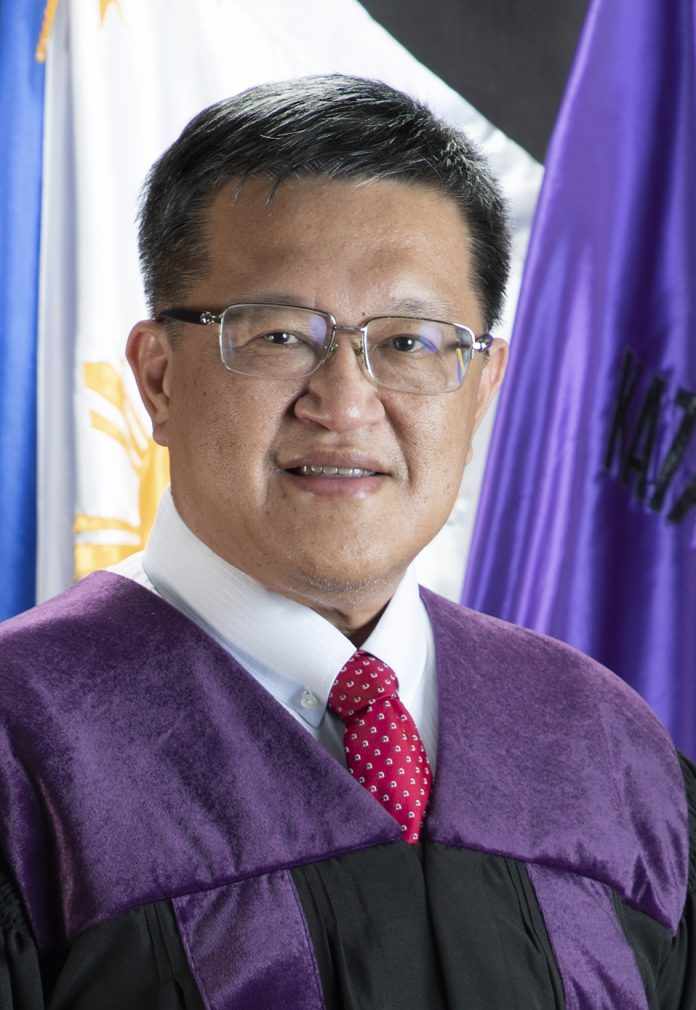
- Kho in December 2022

Associate Justice of the Supreme Court of the Philippines
- Incumbent
- Assumed office February 23, 2022
- Appointed by: Rodrigo Duterte
- Preceded by: Rosmari Carandang

Commissioner of the Commission on Elections
- In office July 11, 2018 – February 2, 2022
- Appointed by: Rodrigo Duterte
- Preceded by: Arthur D. Lim
- Succeeded by: George Garcia

Personal details
- Born: June 29, 1966 (age 60) Jolo, Sulu, Philippines
- Education: De La Salle University (AB); San Beda College of Law (LLB)

Antonio Tongio Kho Jr. (born June 29, 1966) is a Filipino jurist who has served as an associate justice of the Supreme Court of the Philippines since 2022. He was appointed by President Rodrigo Duterte to replace Justice Rosmari Carandang.

== Early life and education ==
Kho was born in 1966 in Jolo, Sulu. He received his Bachelor of Laws degree from the San Beda College of Law in 1991, where he was part of the Lex Talionis Fraternitas fraternity.

== Career ==
Kho served as an undersecretary in the Department of Justice under former secretary Vitaliano Aguirre II. In July 2018, Kho was appointed to COMELEC by president Rodrigo Duterte and he retired from the organization on February 2, 2022.

=== Supreme Court appointment ===
On February 23, 2022, President Rodrigo Duterte appointed Kho to the court, to fill the vacancy left by the retirement of Justice Rosmari Carandang. He took the oath of office on February 24, 2022. He will retire from the court on June 29, 2036.

Legal offices
Preceded by Rosmari Carandang	Associate Justice of the Supreme Court of the Philippines; 2022–present	Incumbent
