= Josue Bellosillo =

Filipino judge (born 1933)

The Honorable Josue N. Bellosillo

32nd Senior Associate Justice of the Supreme Court of the Philippines
- In office August 1, 1999 – December 13, 2003
- Preceded by: Flerida Ruth Pineda-Romero
- Succeeded by: Reynato Puno

127th Associate Justice of the Supreme Court of the Philippines
- In office March 3, 1992 – November 13, 2003
- Appointed by: Corazon Aquino
- Preceded by: Andres Narvasa
- Succeeded by: Minita Chico-Nazario

Personal details
- Born: November 13, 1933 (age 92) Capiz, Capiz, Philippine Islands
- Education: University of the Philippines Diliman (BA); University of the Philippines Diliman (LLB)

Josue Neri Bellosillo (born November 13, 1933) is a former associate justice of the Supreme Court of the Philippines. He was sworn in as a member of the Supreme Court by President Corazon Aquino on March 3, 1992, and served until his retirement on November 13, 2003. He served as associate justice of the Supreme Court of the Philippines for a period of eleven years. He also served as chief justice in an acting capacity several times during his tenure as Senior Associate Justice.

== Biography ==
Born in Capiz (now Roxas), Capiz on November 13, 1933, Bellosillo finished his elementary education at the Capiz Elementary School and his secondary education at the Colegio de la Purisima Concepcion. He obtained his pre-law degree and law degree from the University of the Philippines College of Law at UP Diliman where he graduated in 1957. During this time, he also joined the Upsilon Sigma Phi fraternity in 1952.

After working as a lawyer, Bellosillo first became a judge in 1971, when he sat in the Court of Agrarian Reform in Iloilo. After serving as a judge in other courts in Iloilo, Rizal and Pasig, he became Administrator and Associate Justice of the Court of Appeals from 1986 to 1991. In 1992, he was appointed by President Corazon Aquino as an associate justice of the Supreme Court of the Philippines and subsequently became senior associate justice, standing in for Chief Justice Hilario Davide during times of temporary vacancies. He retired in 2003 and was replaced by Minita Chico-Nazario.

In 2003, Bellosillo was among eight Supreme Court justices who were subjected to an impeachment complaint filed by former president Joseph Estrada over their role in his ouster during the Second EDSA Revolution, when they appeared at the inauguration of his vice president, Gloria Macapagal-Arroyo, and subsequently ruled in favor of upholding her assumption of the presidency.

Since his retirement, Bellosillo has served as dean of the Centro Escolar University School of Law and Jurisprudence and has authored books on legal practice. He has also served as vice chairman and corporate counsel of Philtrust Bank.

== Works ==
- Effect Pre-Trial Technique (1990, republished 2011)
- Omnibus Election Code with Rules of Procedure & Jurisprudence in Election Law (with Midas Marquez and Emmanuel Mapili, 2007)
- Fundamentals of Nursing Law, Jurisprudence & Ethics (with Midas Marquez, Mapili and Eufemeia Octaviano, 2008)
- Fundamentals of Dental Jurisprudence, Ethics & Practice Management (with Emmanuel Mapili and Leonor Tripon-Rosero, 2009)
- Leave us alone (2009)
- Basics of Philippine Medical Jurisprudence & Ethics (with Emmanuel Mapili, Castro, Albert Rebosa, and Antonio Rebosa, 2010)
- Introduction to Nursing Jurisprudence, Ethics, Leadership and Management (with Midas Marquez, Emmanuel Mapili and Lucia Basilonia-Simon, 2011)
- Effective Litigation & Adjudication of Election Contests (with Midas Marquez and Emmanuel Mapili, 2012)

Legal offices
Preceded by Flerida Ruth Pineda-Romero	Associate Justice of the Supreme Court; 1999–2003	Succeeded by Reynato Puno
Preceded by Andres Narvasa	Senior Associate Justice of the Supreme Court; 1992–2003	Succeeded by Minita Chico-Nazario
