= Rey Bulay =

Filipino lawyer (born 1958)

Rey Echavarria Bulay Esq.
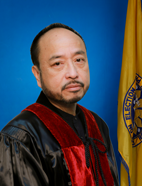
- Official portrait of Bulay as a COMELEC commissioner

Commissioner of the Commission on Elections
- Incumbent
- Assumed office November 11, 2021
- Appointed by: Rodrigo Duterte

Member of the Muntinlupa City Council
- In office June 30, 1988 – June 30, 1998
- In office June 30, 2007 – June 30, 2010

Personal details
- Born: Rey Echavarria Bulay; May 19, 1958 (age 68)
- Spouse: Carminia Isabel Ferrera
- Children: Tristan Angelo Bulay
- Parent(s): Dr. Mario N. Bulay; Prof. Ernani Echavarria Bulay
- Education: University of the Philippines Los Baños (B.S. Statistics); San Beda College of Law (LL.B.)
- Occupation: Election official, prosecutor
- Profession: Lawyer
- Known for: Founding the Philippine Councilors League; serving as Muntinlupa City councilor; role in the Presidential Commission on Good Government

Rey Echavarria Bulay (born May 19, 1958) is a Filipino lawyer, election official, former politician, and former prosecutor who has served as commissioner of the Commission on Elections (Comelec) since 2021. Appointed by President Rodrigo Duterte, his term is set to run until February 2, 2027. Bulay is a former city councilor of Muntinlupa, a founding father of the Philippine Councilors League, and a past commissioner of the Presidential Commission on Good Government (PCGG).

== Early life and education ==
Bulay is the eldest son of Dr. Mario Navarro Bulay and music professor Ernani Echavarria Bulay. He graduated with a Bachelor of Science degree in Statistics from the University of the Philippines Los Baños. He later obtained a Bachelor of Laws degree from the San Beda College of Law in Mendiola, Manila, and was admitted to the Philippine Bar in 2002.

== Political and public service career ==
=== Local government service ===
Bulay began his political career as a city councilor in Muntinlupa, serving three terms from 1988 to 1998, and again from 2007 to 2010. In 1988, he co-founded the Philippine Councilors League, serving as one of its pioneering leaders. In 1995, he authored the measure converting Muntinlupa into a highly urbanized city.

In 2003, he pioneered the "One-Stop Government Shop" concept in Muntinlupa, bringing together services from the LTO, NBI, and the PNP.

=== Awards and recognition ===
In 1990, Bulay topped the National Real Estate Broker’s Examination held at Hotel InterContinental. He received the Outstanding Alumni Award from the National Muntinlupa High School in 2008.

=== Presidential Commission on Good Government ===
On November 16, 2016, President Rodrigo Duterte appointed Bulay as commissioner of the Presidential Commission on Good Government, the agency mandated to recover the ill-gotten wealth of former president Ferdinand Marcos and his associates.

=== Manila chief prosecutor ===
In July 2020, Duterte appointed Bulay as the chief city prosecutor of Manila.

== Commission on Elections ==
On November 11, 2021, President Duterte appointed Bulay as commissioner of the Commission on Elections, succeeding to one of the vacant seats on the seven-member en banc. He joined chair Sheriff Abas and commissioners Rowena Guanzon, Socorro Inting, Marlon Casquejo, Antonio Kho Jr., and Aimee Ferolino.

On December 1, 2021, Bulay’s appointment was confirmed by the Commission on Appointments, and his term is scheduled to expire on February 2, 2027.

Presidential spokesperson Harry Roque stated that the administration was confident Bulay would "ensure the conduct of honest, orderly, credible, and peaceful elections."

=== Remarks on critics ===
In April 2022, Bulay warned that the Armed Forces of the Philippines, deputized by the Commission on Elections during elections, could be called to detain individuals accusing the poll body of bias or fraud. Legal experts noted that such arrests would face constitutional limits under freedom of speech and due process protections.

== Personal life ==
Bulay is married to Carminia Isabel Ferrera, with whom he has one son, Tristan Angelo Bulay.
