= Diosdado Peralta =

Chief Justice of the Supreme Court of the Philippines from 2019 to 2021

The Honorable Diosdado M. Peralta
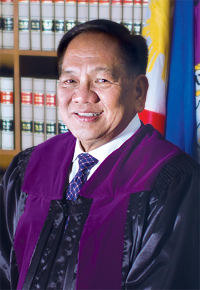

26th Chief Justice of the Supreme Court of the Philippines
- In office October 23, 2019 – March 27, 2021
- Nominated by: Judicial and Bar Council
- Appointed by: Rodrigo Duterte
- Preceded by: Lucas Bersamin
- Succeeded by: Alexander Gesmundo

162nd Associate Justice of the Supreme Court of the Philippines
- In office January 13, 2009 – October 22, 2019
- Appointed by: Gloria Macapagal Arroyo
- Preceded by: Ruben Reyes
- Succeeded by: Samuel Gaerlan

5th Presiding Justice of the Sandiganbayan
- In office March 28, 2008 – January 14, 2009
- Appointed by: Gloria Macapagal Arroyo
- Preceded by: Ediberto Sandoval (acting)
- Succeeded by: Maria Cristina Cortez-Estrada

41st Associate Justice of the Sandiganbayan
- In office June 14, 2002 – March 28, 2008
- Appointed by: Gloria Macapagal Arroyo
- Preceded by: Narciso Nario Sr.
- Succeeded by: Alex L. Quiroz

Personal details
- Born: Diosdado Madarang Peralta; March 27, 1952 (age 74) Laoag, Ilocos Norte, Philippines
- Spouse: Fernanda C. Lampas
- Children: 3
- Education: Colegio de San Juan de Letran (BS); University of Santo Tomas (LL.B)
- Affiliation: Gamma Delta Epsilon

Diosdado "Dado" Madarang Peralta (born March 27, 1952) is a Filipino lawyer and jurist who served as the chief justice of the Supreme Court of the Philippines from 2019 to 2021. He previously served as an associate justice of the Supreme Court of the Philippines from January 13, 2009, to October 22, 2019. He is the third Sandiganbayan presiding justice to be appointed to the high tribunal.

== Personal life and education ==
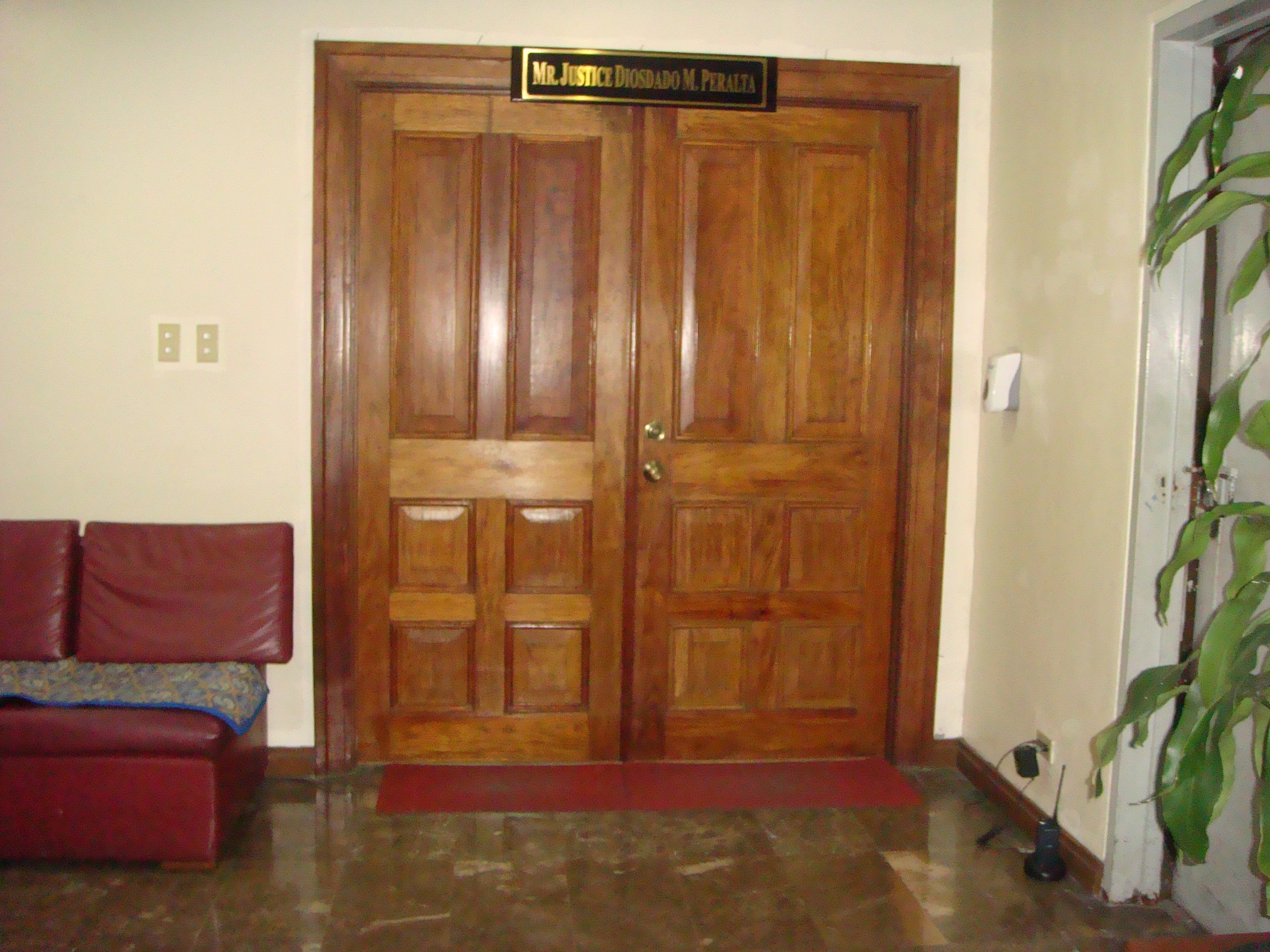
Chambers of Diosdado M. Peralta (new Supreme Court building)

Peralta finished his Bachelor of Science degree at the Colegio de San Juan de Letran in 1974 before pursuing law at the University of Santo Tomas Faculty of Civil Law, where he graduated in 1979. He is married to Fernanda Lampas-Peralta, an associate justice of the Philippine Court of Appeals.

== Career ==
=== Legal career ===
Peralta worked in the private sector before joining government service as an assistant city prosecutor in Laoag City and Manila.

=== Jurist ===
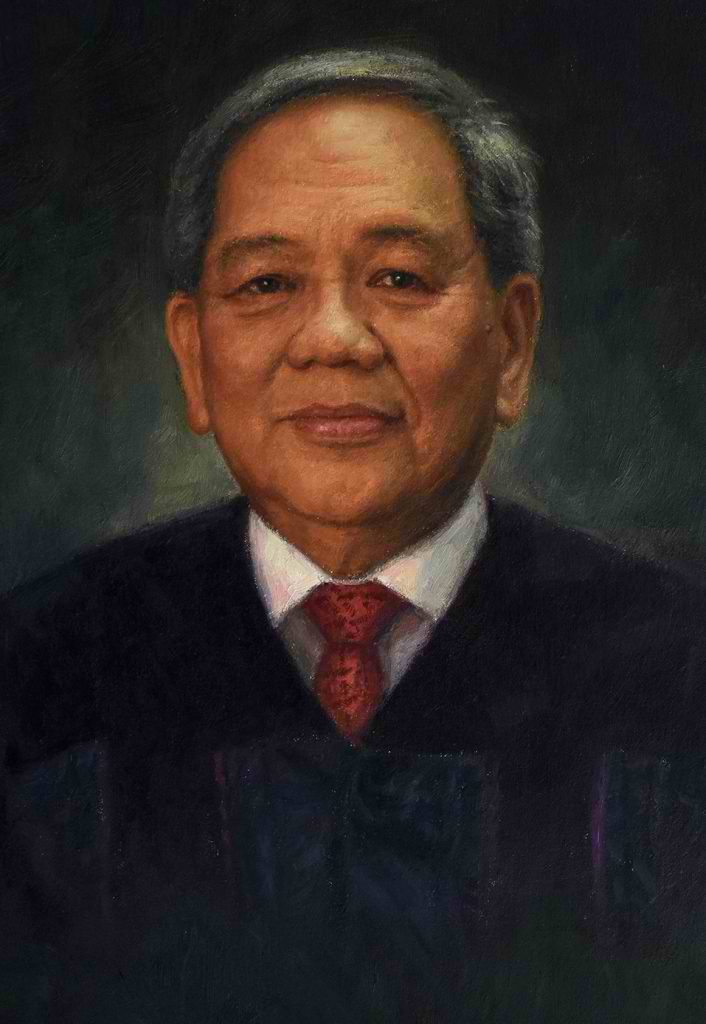
Official portrait of Diosdado Peralta

On September 22, 1994, Peralta was appointed judge of the Regional Trial Court, Branch 95, Quezon City, which was designated as Special Criminal Court on Heinous Crimes and, later, Drugs Cases, then named to the Sandiganbayan in 2002 by President Gloria Macapagal-Arroyo. He was designated presiding justice of the Sandiganbayan in March 2008, and served in that capacity until his appointment to the Supreme Court. Peralta is the chairperson of the High Court's Committee on the Revision of the Benchbook on the Application, Computation, and Graduation of Penalties. He previously sat as a member of the House of Representative Electoral Tribunal (HET). Peralta was the chairman of the 2014 Philippine Bar Examination committee.

=== Chief Justice ===
On October 23, 2019, Peralta was appointed by President Rodrigo Duterte as the Chief Justice of the Supreme Court of the Philippines, succeeding Lucas Bersamin.

In December 2020, he announced that he would retire on March 27, 2021; a year earlier than his required mandatory retirement, of which he was succeeded as chief justice by Alexander Gesmundo on April 5, 2021.

== Awards ==
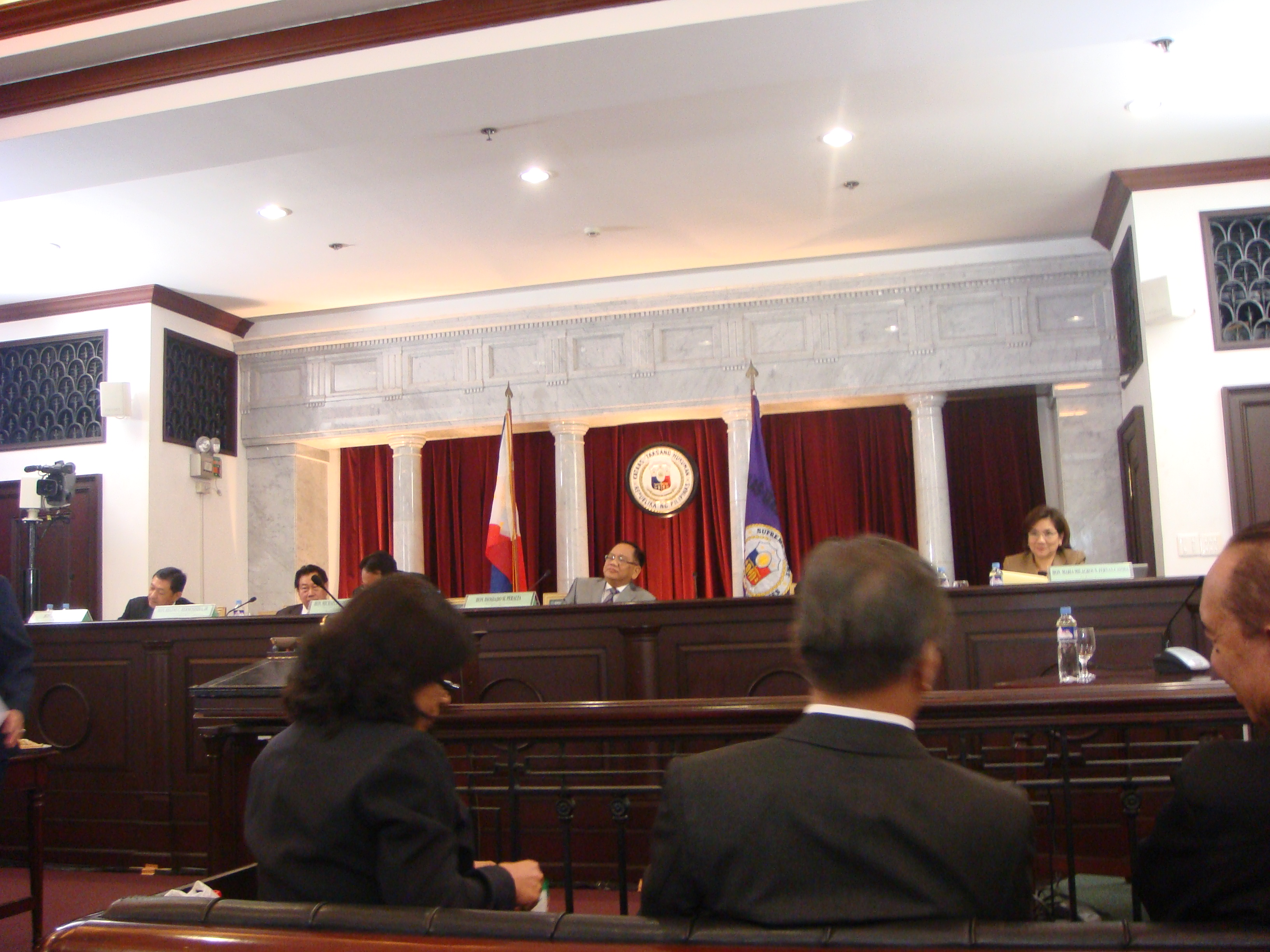
Justice Peralta sits as Judicial and Bar Council (Philippines) Chair in the Chief Justice of the Philippines Panel Interview.

Peralta was the recipient of several commendations, two of which were the Special Centennial Awards in the Field of Criminal Law, given by the Integrated Bar of the Philippines and the Supreme Court during its centennial celebration on June 6, 2001, and the Judicial Excellence Awards 2002 (Chief Justice Ramon Avanceña Award for Outstanding Regional Trial Court Judge). In recognition of his vast contribution in the field of law, he was also the recipient of the Outstanding Thomasian Alumni Awards for Law (TOTAL Awardee in Law/Justice) on August 2, 2008, which was the highest award bestowed by the University of Santo Tomas to an alumnus.

== See also ==
- Supreme Court of the Philippines
- Presidency of Rodrigo Duterte

Legal offices
Preceded by Lucas Bersamin	Chief Justice of the Supreme Court; 2019–2021	Succeeded by Alexander Gesmundo
Preceded by Ruben Reyes	Associate Justice of the Supreme Court of the Philippines; 2009–2019	Succeeded by Samuel Gaerlan
Preceded by Ediberto Sandoval	Presiding Justice of the Sandiganbayan; 2008–2009	Succeeded by Maria Cristina Cortez-Estrada
Preceded by Cipriano De Rosario	Associate Justice of the Sandiganbayan; 2002–2008	Succeeded by Alex Quiroz
