= Andres Reyes Jr. =

Associate Justice of the Supreme Court of the Philippines

The Honorable Andres Reyes Jr.
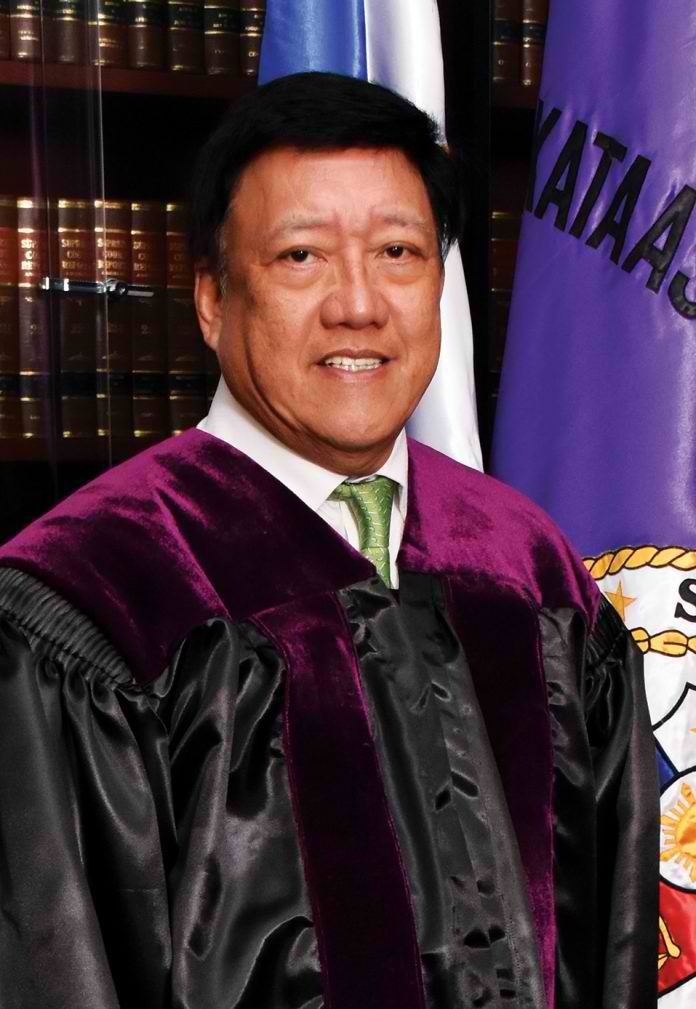
- Official portrait, 2018

Chairperson of the Independent Commission for Infrastructure
- In office September 15, 2025 – March 31, 2026
- Appointed by: Ferdinand R. Marcos Jr.
- Preceded by: Position established
- Succeeded by: Position abolished

177th Associate Justice of the Supreme Court of the Philippines
- In office July 12, 2017 – May 11, 2020
- Appointed by: Rodrigo Duterte
- Preceded by: Bienvenido Reyes
- Succeeded by: Priscilla Baltazar-Padilla

Presiding Justice of the Court of Appeals of the Philippines
- In office February 22, 2010 – July 12, 2017
- Appointed by: Gloria Macapagal Arroyo
- Preceded by: Conrado Vasquez Jr.
- Succeeded by: Romeo Barza

Personal details
- Born: Andres Bernal Reyes Jr. May 11, 1950 (age 76)
- Education: Saint Mary's College of California (BS); Ateneo de Manila University (LLB); Philippine Women's University (MPA)
- Affiliation: Fraternal Order of Utopia

Andres Bernal Reyes Jr. (born May 11, 1950) is a Filipino lawyer who served as an associate justice of the Supreme Court of the Philippines from 2017 to 2020. He was appointed by President Rodrigo Duterte replacing Associate Justice Bienvenido Reyes. He was appointed by President Bongbong Marcos as Chairman of the Independent Commission for Infrastructure, which is mandated to investigate anomalous infrastructure projects.

== Works ==
Reyes, the first Atenean law graduate appointed by Duterte, previously served the Metropolitan Trial Court of Makati, Regional Trial Court of San Mateo Rizal and started working as the Associate Justice of the appellate court in 1999. In 2010, he was appointed as Presiding Justice of the Court of Appeals.

== Personal life ==
Reyes is the son of Andres Reyes, Sr., a former Presiding Justice of the Court of Appeals during the Marcos era, and Minerva Bernal.

Reyes attended La Salle Green Hills and De La Salle University, before continuing his education at Saint Mary's College of California, where he obtained a bachelor's degree in Economics. He studied law at Ateneo de Manila University. In 2002, he earned a Master of Public Administration from the Philippine Women's University.

Legal offices
Preceded by Bienvenido L. Reyes	Associate Justice of the Supreme Court of the Philippines; 2017–2020	Succeeded by Priscilla Baltazar-Padilla
