= Antonio Nachura =

Filipino politician (1941–2022)

The Honorable Antonio Nachura
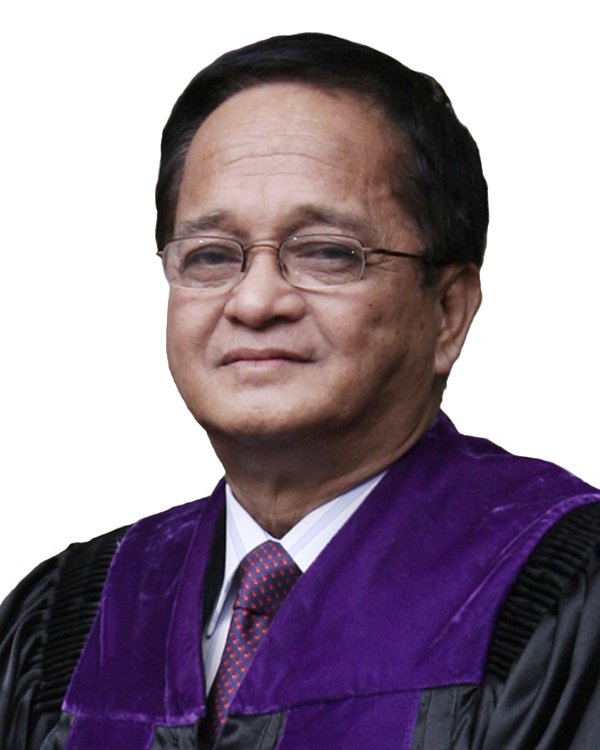
- Nachura in 2007

158th Associate Justice of the Supreme Court of the Philippines
- In office February 7, 2007 – June 13, 2011
- Appointed by: Gloria Macapagal Arroyo
- Preceded by: Reynato Puno
- Succeeded by: Bienvenido Reyes

2nd Chief Presidential Legal Counsel
- In office June 30, 1998 – January 20, 2001
- President: Joseph Ejercito Estrada
- Preceded by: Antonio Carpio
- Succeeded by: Sergio Apostol

Solicitor General of the Philippines
- In office April 3, 2006 – February 7, 2007
- President: Gloria Macapagal Arroyo
- Preceded by: Alfredo Benipayo
- Succeeded by: Agnes Devanadera

Member of the Philippine House of Representatives from Samar's 2nd District
- In office June 30, 1998 – June 30, 2004
- Preceded by: Catalino V. Figueroa
- Succeeded by: Catalino V. Figueroa

Personal details
- Born: Antonio Eduardo Bermejo Nachura; June 13, 1941 Catbalogan, Samar, Commonwealth of the Philippines
- Died: March 13, 2022 (aged 80)
- Resting place: Garden Of The Divine Word, Christ the King Mission Seminary, Quezon City
- Party: Liberal
- Spouse: Conchita Sison

Antonio Eduardo Bermejo Nachura (June 13, 1941 – March 13, 2022) was a Filipino jurist who was an Associate Justice of the Supreme Court of the Philippines. He took his oath of office as Associate Justice on February 7, 2007, and occupied the position until his mandatory retirement on June 13, 2011. Previously, Nachura had been Solicitor-General of the Philippines at the time his appointment to the Court was announced on January 31, 2007, by then-Philippine President Gloria Macapagal Arroyo.

== Background ==
Born in Catbalogan, Nachura was a graduate of the San Beda College of Law. He placed 7th in the 1967 bar examinations. In addition, he held a Doctor of Public Management from the Pamantasan ng Lungsod ng Maynila (University of the City of Manila).

From his years as a professor of law and a bar reviewer, Nachura has earned wide respect as an expert in political law. He was the Dean of the Arellano Law School from 1992 to 1994. He resigned as Dean in 1994 to accept an appointment as Undersecretary of the Department of Education, Culture and Sports.

== Public life ==
In 1998, Nachura was elected congressman in the House of Representatives, representing the 2nd District of Samar. He served in the 11th Congress and the 12th Congress. He was an unsuccessful candidate for re-election to the 13th Congress in 2004.

In February 2006, Nachura was named Chief Presidential Legal Counsel by President Gloria Macapagal Arroyo. The following month, Nachura was appointed Solicitor-General on March 17, 2006, replacing Alfredo Benipayo. In his capacity as Solicitor-General, Nachura has represented the Republic of the Philippines in various cases pending before the courts, including such high-profile cases before the Supreme Court as the People's Initiative cases decided in October, 2006.

== Personal life ==
Nachura died on March 13, 2022, at the age of 80.

== Notes ==
Legal offices
Preceded by Reynato S. Puno	Associate Justice of the Supreme Court of the Philippines; February 7, 2007–June 13, 2011	Succeeded by Bienvenido L. Reyes
House of Representatives of the Philippines
Preceded by Catalino V. Figueroa	Representative of 2nd District of Samar; 1998 – 2004	Succeeded by Catalino V. Figueroa
