= Jhosep Lopez =

Filipino judge & politician (born 1963)

- Lopez in December 2022

Associate Justice of the Supreme Court of the Philippines
- Incumbent
- Assumed office January 26, 2021
- Appointed by: Rodrigo Duterte
- Preceded by: Priscilla Baltazar-Padilla

Associate Justice of the Court of Appeals of the Philippines
- In office May 17, 2012 – January 26, 2021
- Appointed by: Benigno Aquino III
- Preceded by: Josefina Guevarra-Salonga
- Succeeded by: Jill Rose Jaugan-Lo

Member of the Manila City Council from the 3rd district
- In office June 30, 1992 – June 30, 1998
- In office June 30, 2001 – February 14, 2006

Personal details
- Born: February 8, 1963 (age 63) Umingan, Pangasinan, Philippines
- Party: Liberal
- Education: University of the Philippines (BA, LLB)

Jhosep Ylarde Lopez (born February 8, 1963) is a Filipino politician and judge who has served as an associate justice of the Supreme Court of the Philippines since 2021. He was appointed by President Rodrigo Duterte to replace Associate Justice Priscilla Baltazar-Padilla.

== Early life and career ==
Lopez graduated cum laude with a degree in Political Science from the University of the Philippines Diliman. He proceeded to take up his Law studies at the same University where he became a brother of the Sigma Rho law-based Fraternity. He passed the Bar examinations in 1989 with an average of 84.55%.

Lopez worked as legal counsel of the University of the Philippines for a year before being promoted as chief legal officer of the Philippine General Hospital. In 1991, he worked under former Senate president Jovito Salonga and was later appointed as chief legal counsel of the Senate of the Philippines. He was appointed as Chief City Prosecutor of Manila in February 2006. He was also a partner in the Lopez Rasul Maliwanag Baybay Palaran Law Offices from 1993 to 2006.

He served as a city councilor of Manila from the 3rd District from 1992 to 1998 and from 2001 to 2006. He also ran for representative for the same district under the Liberal Party in 1998, but lost to Harry Angping.

Lopez was appointed as associate justice of the Court of Appeals on May 17, 2012, and served for more than eight years until his appointment to the Supreme Court.

== Associate Justice of the Supreme Court ==
On January 26, 2021, President Rodrigo Duterte appointed Lopez as associate justice of the Supreme Court of the Philippines. Lopez succeeded Justice Priscilla Baltazar-Padilla who retired on November 3, 2020.

On November 16, 2021, Justice Jhosep Y. Lopez authored the landmark decision in Cadajas v. People (G.R. No. 247348), reconciling the Cybercrime Prevention Act of 2012 (Republic Act No. 10175) with the Anti-Child Pornography Act of 2009 (Republic Act No. 9775). Addressing the admissibility of digital evidence in cyber-child exploitation cases, Lopez held that the constitutional right to privacy and the exclusionary rule apply strictly against State action, meaning private individuals, such as parents or relatives accessing a minor's device or chat logs, do not violate the Bill of Rights when turning over evidence to authorities. Furthermore, the Court established that voluntarily sharing social media account credentials extinguishes a reasonable expectation of privacy, and firmly rejected the "sweetheart defense," ruling that soliciting explicit digital content from minors constitutes illegal child pornography regardless of any alleged consensual or romantic relationship.

On February 5, 2025, Lopez penned the historic En Banc ruling in Josef v. Ursua (G.R. No. 267469), advancing LGBTQ+ civil rights by extending the application of Article 148 of the Family Code to same-sex cohabiting partners. Confronting a long-standing statutory void in Philippine property relations for non-heterosexual couples, Lopez ruled that properties acquired during a same-sex relationship through proven joint financial or material contributions are governed by civil co-ownership rules. Writing for the High Tribunal, Lopez emphasized that same-sex cohabitation constitutes a genuine human relationship that cannot be rendered legally invisible under property law, securing a vital precedent for equitable financial partition and legal dignity upon the dissolution of same-sex unions.

Legal offices
| Preceded by Priscilla Baltazar-Padilla | Associate Justice of the Supreme Court of the Philippines; 2021–present | Incumbent |
