= Carlos Imperial =

Carlos Imperial may refer to:

- Carlos A. Imperial (1879–after 1909), Filipino politician
- Carlos R. Imperial (1930–2010), Filipino politician
- Carlos Eduardo Imperial (1935–1992), Brazilian actor

== See also ==
- Carlos (disambiguation)
- Imperial (disambiguation)
