= Dennis B. Funa =

Filipino lawyer, businessman, public official and author

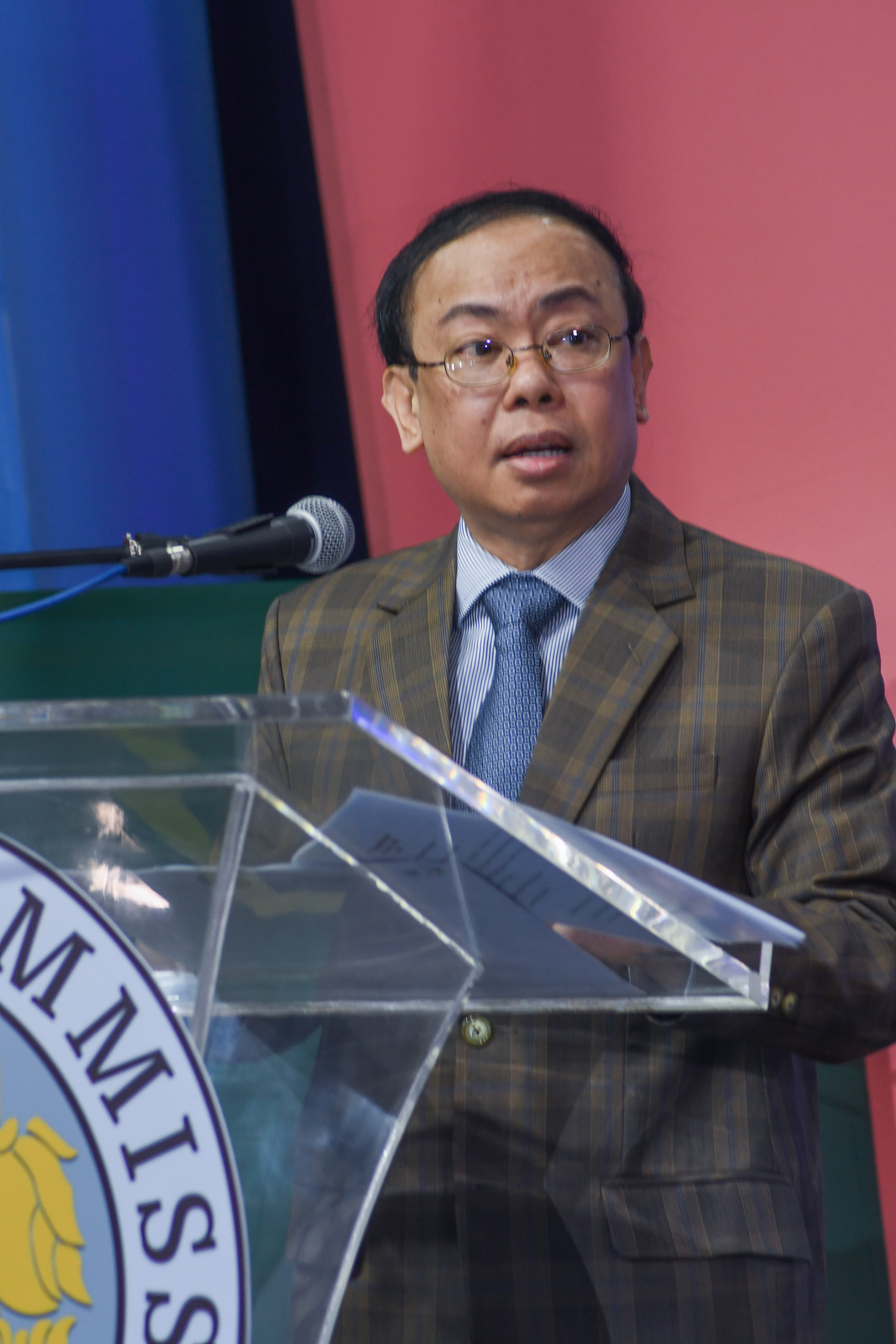
Funa in January 2020

Dennis B. Funa is a Filipino lawyer, businessman, public official, law book author, professor of law, constitutionalist, and the current Commissioner of the Philippines' Insurance Commission. As a Filipino lawyer, he is the managing partner of a Metro Manila based law firm. He has served the Philippine government from 1992 to 1998, and 2013 to the present in various capacities.

== Education ==
He finished his undergraduate degree in De La Salle University in Manila, with a degree of Bachelor of Commerce in Marketing. He then took up and finished his Bachelor of Laws degree at the San Beda College of Law. He finished his secondary studies also at San Beda. He took his elementary studies at the St. Francis Xavier School of New York in New York City, the United States.

He received special training as a scholar of the Association for Overseas Technical Scholarship (AOTS) in Tokyo, Japan in 1999. He was a scholar of the London-based International Bar Association during its Biennial Conference in New Delhi, India in 1997.

Funa while an elementary student in New York City. Standing before the New York Public Library along Fifth Avenue.

== Former public official ==
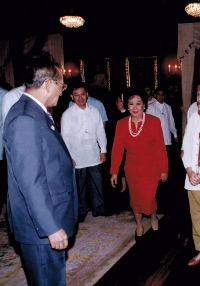
Inside Malacañan Palace with First Lady Amelita "Ming" Ramos, as President Ramos looks (1994)

In 1992, he became the Special Assistant to the Appointments Secretary of Philippine President Fidel V. Ramos. Soon thereafter, he became the Technical Assistant (Director) to the Chief Presidential Legal Counsel of President Fidel Ramos. At the age of 28, he became the youngest presidential-appointee of President Ramos and the executive director of the Videogram Regulatory Board, which later became the Optical Media Board. He was concurrently member of the Presidential Inter-Agency Committee on Intellectual Property Rights and the National Law Enforcement Coordinating Committee.

He also spoke in various intellectual property rights-related conventions, such as in the World Intellectual Property Organization (WIPO)-Asia Pacific Conference on New Technology and the Enforcement of Copyright held in Bali, Indonesia in 1995, and in the WIPO-ASEAN Regional Round Table on IPR Cooperation and the TRIPS Agreement held in Thailand in 1996.

He was also a member of the Philippine government delegation in the several diplomatic conventions on the Internet Treaty organized by the WIPO in Geneva, Switzerland between 1996 and 1997.

After 1998, he became the consultant of the National Power Corporation, the Philippine Amusement and Gaming Corporation.

== Law book author ==
He has written ten (10) law books, namely: The Law on the Administrative Accountability of Public Officers (2007), Legal and Judicial Ethics (2009), International Law (2010), Canons of Statutory Construction (2011), Copyright Law of the Philippines (2011), Trademark Law of the Philippines (2012), Patent Law of the Philippines (2012), Intellectual Property Law (2012), Ombudsman Law (2012), and the Uniform Rules on Administrative Cases in the Civil Service (URACCS) (2012). The books were published by Central Books.

== Constitutionalist ==
He filed a leading constitutional test case in 2009, the case of Funa vs. Executive Secretary et al. wherein the Supreme Court En Banc, by a vote of 14–0 with Justice Renato Corona inhibiting, ruled that a department undersecretary may not concurrently hold another executive post. The Supreme Court said that Department of Transportation and Communications Undersecretary Ma. Elena H. Bautista cannot be head of the Maritime Industry Authority (MARINA) concurrently, as it would violate of Section 13, Article 7, of the 1987 Constitution.

In Funa vs. Commission on Audit Chairman Reynaldo Villar, the Supreme Court En Banc, by a vote of 9-5 ruled that the appointment of COA Commissioner Villar as COA Chairman was unconstitutional for violating Section 1 (2), Article 9 (D) of the 1987 Constitution. The decision established a landmark ruling on the terms of office of members of constitutional bodies.

== Professor of Law ==
He is professor of law at the De La Salle University College of Law. He occasionally delivers lectures under the Mandatory Continuing Legal Education program of the Supreme Court of the Philippines.

== Estrada plunder case ==
Various criminal complaints against Joseph Estrada which would eventuate as the charges in his plunder trial before the Sandiganbayan were filed with the Ombudsman while Estrada was the incumbent President of the Philippines. In fact, some of the complaints were filed even before the impeachment trial started on November 20, 2000. Certainly much before the "second envelope" incident during the impeachment trial which galvanized an outraged nation into an EDSA II. The complainants were criminal justice advocate Dante Jimenez, human rights lawyer Romeo Capulong, noted trial lawyer Leonard De Vera, the late 1971 Constitutional Convention delegate Ramon A. Gonzales, lawyers Ernesto Francisco Jr., Antonio T. Carpio (later Supreme Court Associate Justice), and Dennis B. Funa. One complaint which would be the core of the criminal charges against Estrada and which would ripen to Criminal Case No. 26558 was docketed as OMB-0-00-1756 (Romeo T. Capulong, Leonard de Vera and Dennis Funa vs. Joseph Ejercito Estrada, Dr. Luisa "Loi" Ejercito, Jose "Jinggoy" Estrada, Charlie "Atong" Ang, Delia Rajas, Eleuterio Tan, and Alma Alfaro; see Victor Jose Tan Uy v. Office of the Ombudsman et al., G.R. No. 156399-400, June 27, 2008). Because of his incumbency as president and the inherent immunity from suit that went with that incumbency, the Ombudsman did not proceed with its investigation of the complaints. It was only after President Estrada had been stripped of his immunity, as a result of his (implied) resignation from office on January 20, 2001, that the Ombudsman acted upon the complaints. On January 22, 2001, a mere two days after his resignation, President Estrada, now without presidential immunity, was ordered by the Ombudsman to file his counter-affidavit in answer to the complaints filed against him. On September 12, 2007, former President Joseph E. Estrada was found guilty of Plunder in Criminal Case No. 26558 by the Sandiganbayan Special Division and sentenced to reclusión perpetua. On October 25, 2007, President Macapagal-Arroyo granted executive clemency to Estrada. The pardon took effect the next day when Estrada accepted the pardon on October 26, 2007, at 3:35 pm.

For his participation and contribution in these historic events, he was commended by the multi-sectoral Kongreso ng Mamamayang Pilipino (KOMPIL II) in 2001.

== The Estrada libel charge ==
Dennis Funa is the only Philippine lawyer ever to be charged for libel by a Philippine President. Funa was charged for libel, together with former beauty queen Joelle Pelaez, news reporter Christine Herrera, newspaper editor-in-chief Jojo Robles, and newspaper publisher Teodoro Locsin Jr., by former Philippine President Joseph Ejercito Estrada in a Complaint-Affidavit dated August 2, 2006 filed before the Provincial Prosecutor of Rizal. Estrada demanded 30 million pesos in damages. The libel charge emanated from a five-part investigative report appearing in the Manila Standard Today, a general circulation newspaper in the Philippines. The news series purportedly narrated allegations of money-laundering by some Philippine government officials. Funa was quoted in one interview stating: "The commercial transaction of this magnitude could not have been consummated without the knowledge of the highest officials at the time. We must take note that the commercial transaction occurred sometime in March and mid-2000 and were perfected just before the start of the impeachment proceedings." Funa was then representing as legal counsel Joelle Pelaez, a beauty titlist being romantically linked at that time to the former president, a story Estrada has denied. When the libel complaint was filed, former President Estrada was being detained in his resthouse in Tanay, Rizal pending his trial for plunder. Estrada sought permission from the Sandiganbayan (the anti-graft court) to leave his resthouse to file the complaint. The request was denied, and arrangements were made for the provincial prosecutors to go to Estrada's place of detention to receive the complaint-affidavit. The libel complaint was eventually dismissed in June 2007 by the prosecutors' office on the ground that being a public figure, remarks on Estrada's presidency constituted privileged statements and therefore not libelous.

== Insurance commission ==
In June 2013, Funa was appointed by President Benigno S. Aquino III as a Deputy Commissioner for Legal Services of the Insurance Commission. On 16 November 2016, he became the Officer-in-Charge of the Insurance Commission upon appointment of Commissioner Emmanuel F. Dooc as President of the Social Security System.

As Commissioner, he is also a member of the Anti-Money Laundering Council (Philippines).

== Affiliations ==
He is a member of the Philippine Bar Association. On September 6, 2011, he was appointed as the National Deputy Director for Bar Discipline of the Integrated Bar of the Philippines. He was a Commissioner of the Commission on Bar Discipline of the Integrated Bar of the Philippines from 2002 to 2011.

In June 2007, he was named and awarded as the "Most Outstanding Commissioner" by the Integrated Bar of the Philippines. The award cited the works of Atty. Funa as being made "judiciously and justly, thereby ably and effectively assisting the Supreme Court in the supervision and regulation of the legal profession." He is a member of the Lex Talionis Fraternitas and was its Grand Judex in 1988 to 1989.

== Website ==
https://www.dennisfuna.com/
