= Associate Justice of the Supreme Court of the Philippines =

Member of the Supreme Court of the Philippines

An associate justice of the Supreme Court (Filipino: Kasangguning Mahistrado ng Kataas-taasang Hukuman) is one of fifteen members of the Supreme Court, the highest court in the Philippines. The chief justice presides over the high court, but carries only one of the 15 votes in the court. Traditionally, the chief justice is deemed primus inter pares ("first among equals") among the justices.

Until 1973, only men were appointed as Associate Justices to the Court. Cecilia Muñoz-Palma, an appointee of President Ferdinand Marcos, was the first woman to sit on the court. Since then, 15 other women have been appointed as Associate Justices of the Supreme Court. The most recent woman to be appointed to the high tribunal is Maria Filomena Singh, a former justice of the Court of Appeals of the Philippines on May 18, 2022.

== Incumbent associate justices ==
As of November 13, 2026, there are thirteen associate justices (originally 14) on the Supreme Court, due to the appointment of Rodil Zalameda as Chief Justice on November 6, 2026. The most recent appointment was by Gamaliel Cordoba, who was appointed on November 13, 2026, to replace Amy Lazaro-Javier.

The justices, ordered by seniority, are:

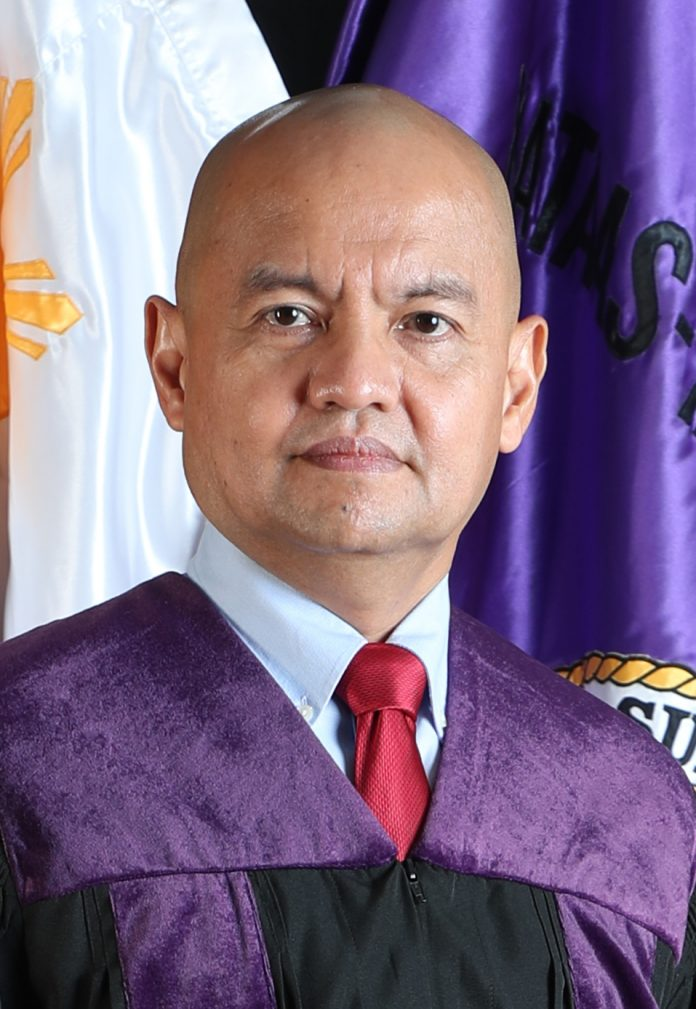
Marvic Leonen,
since November 11, 2012

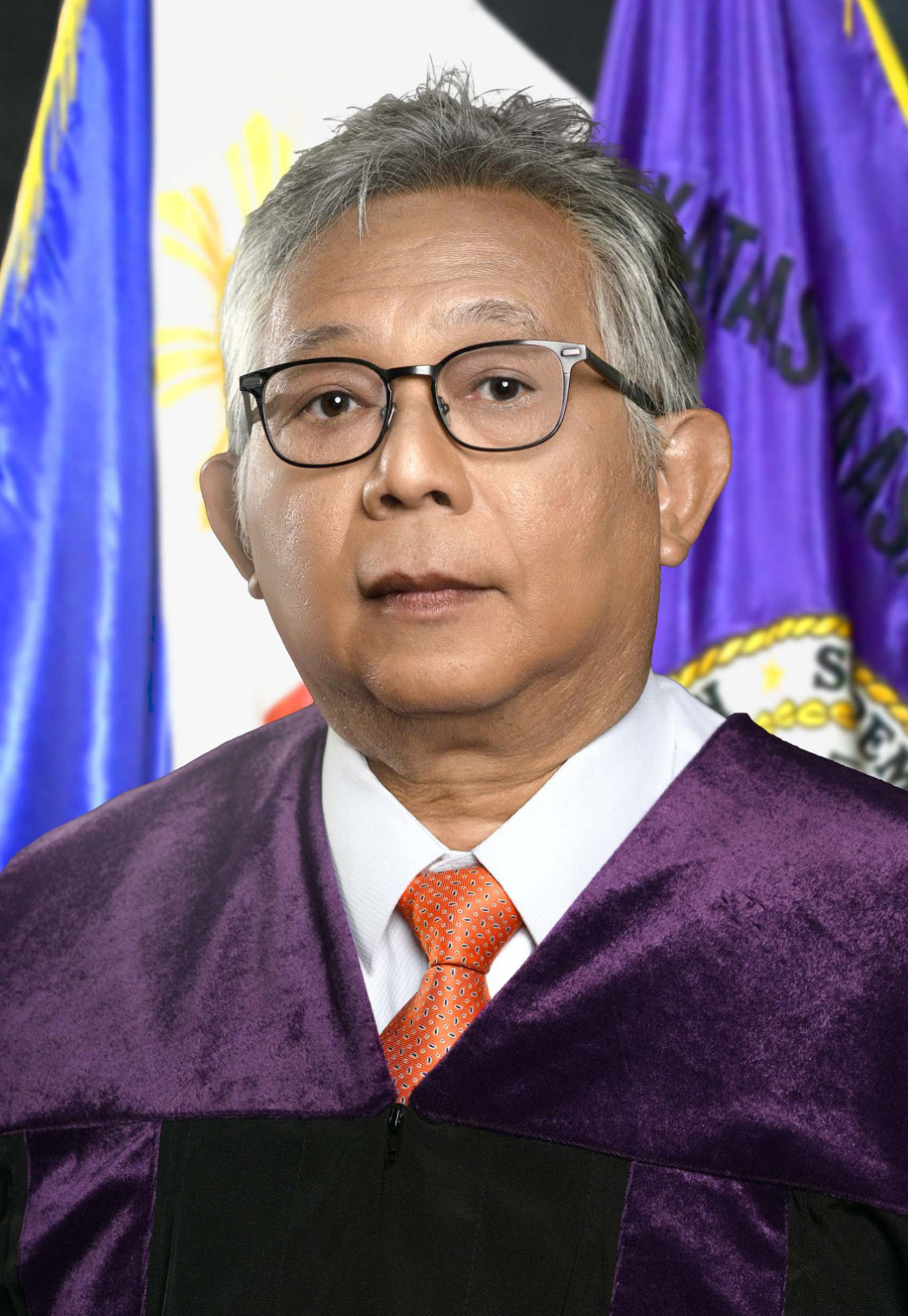
Alfredo Benjamin Caguioa,
since January 22, 2016

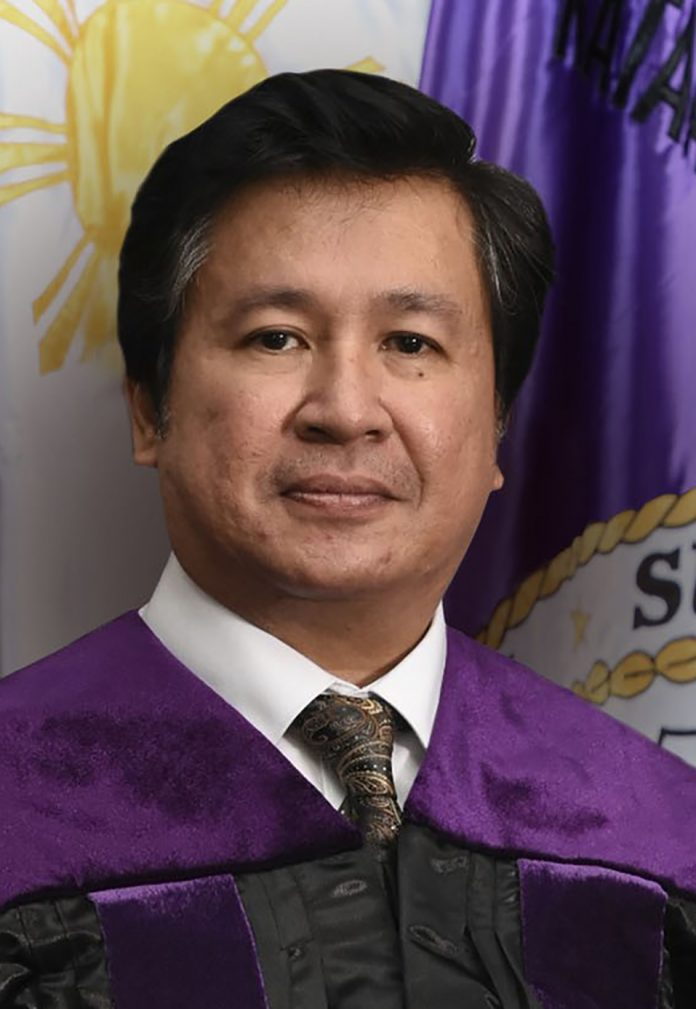
Ramon Paul Hernando,
since August 27, 2018

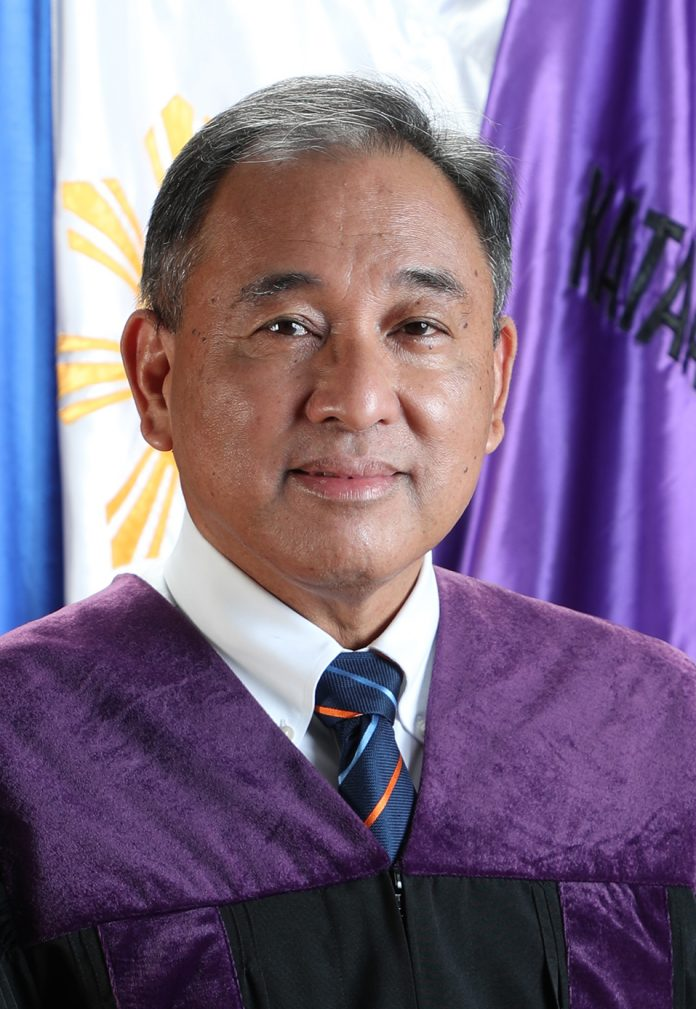
Henri Jean Paul Inting,
since May 27, 2019

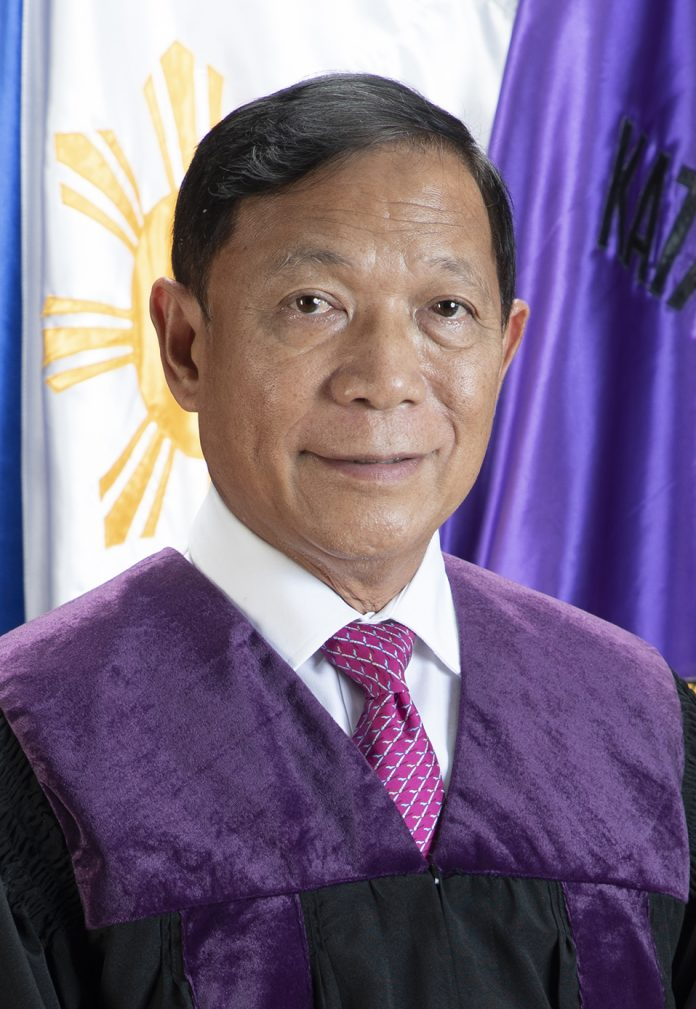
Samuel Gaerlan,
since January 8, 2020

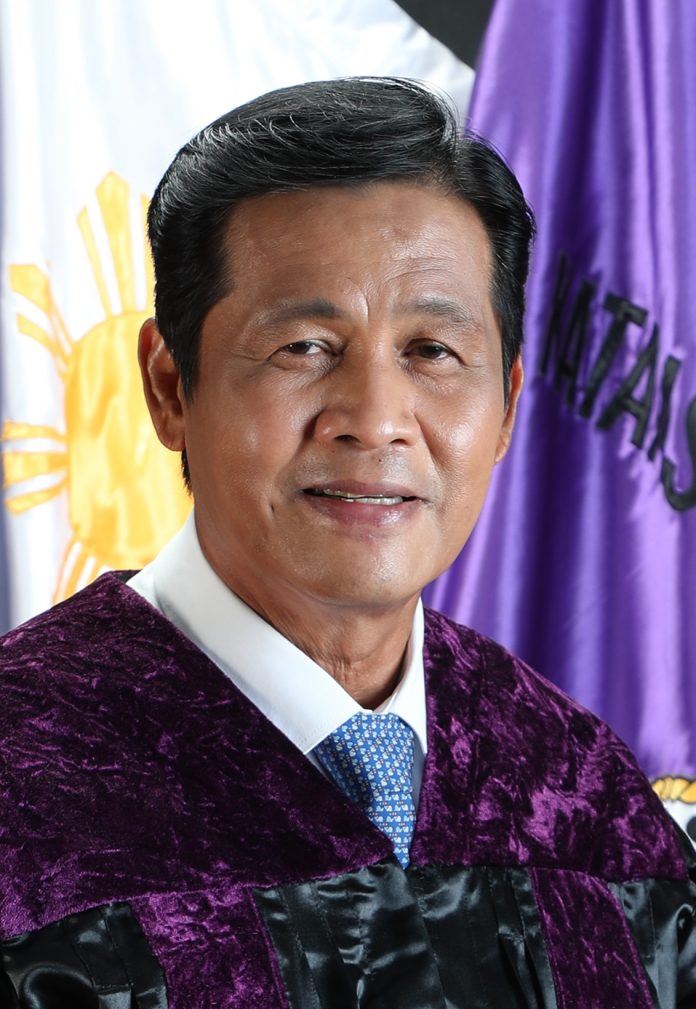
Ricardo Rosario,
since October 8, 2020

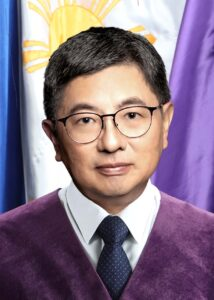
Jhosep Lopez,
since January 26, 2021

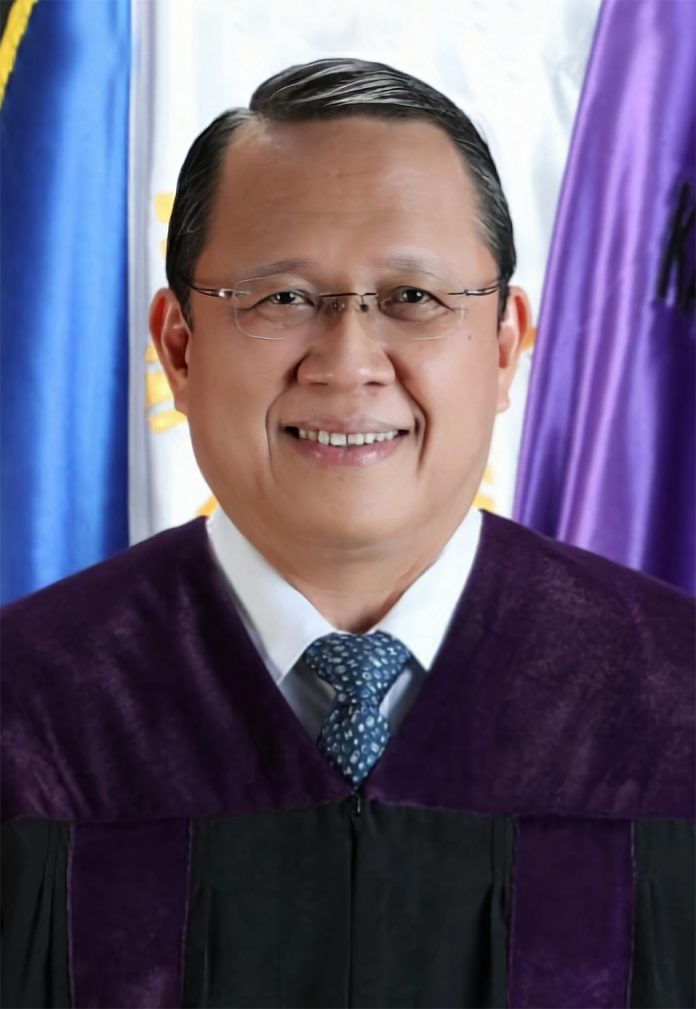
Japar Dimaampao,
since July 2, 2021

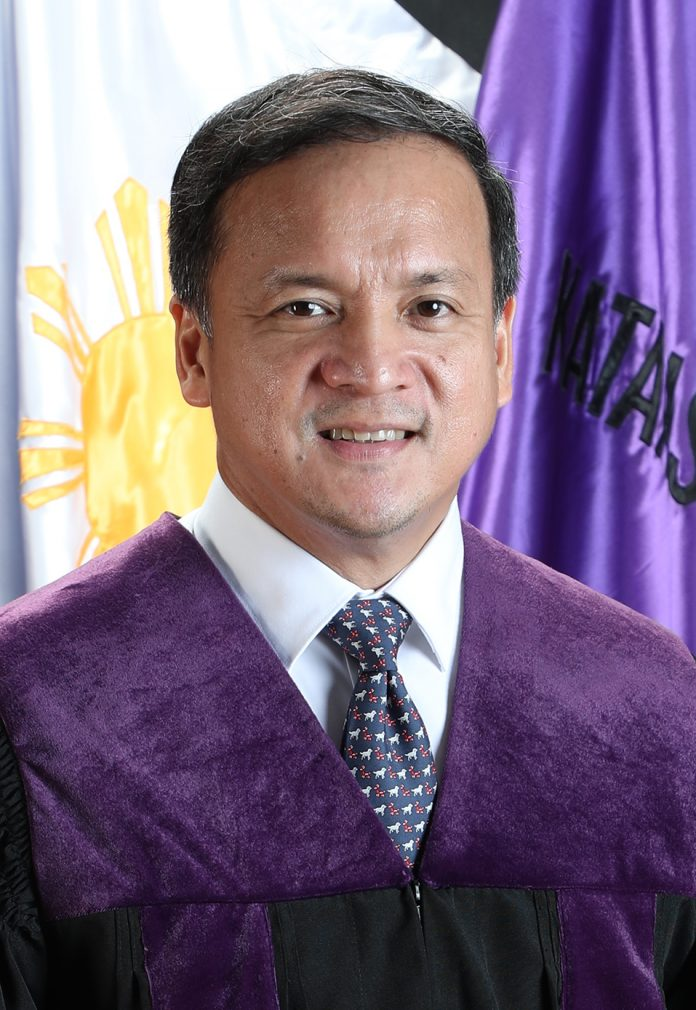
Midas Marquez,
since September 27, 2021

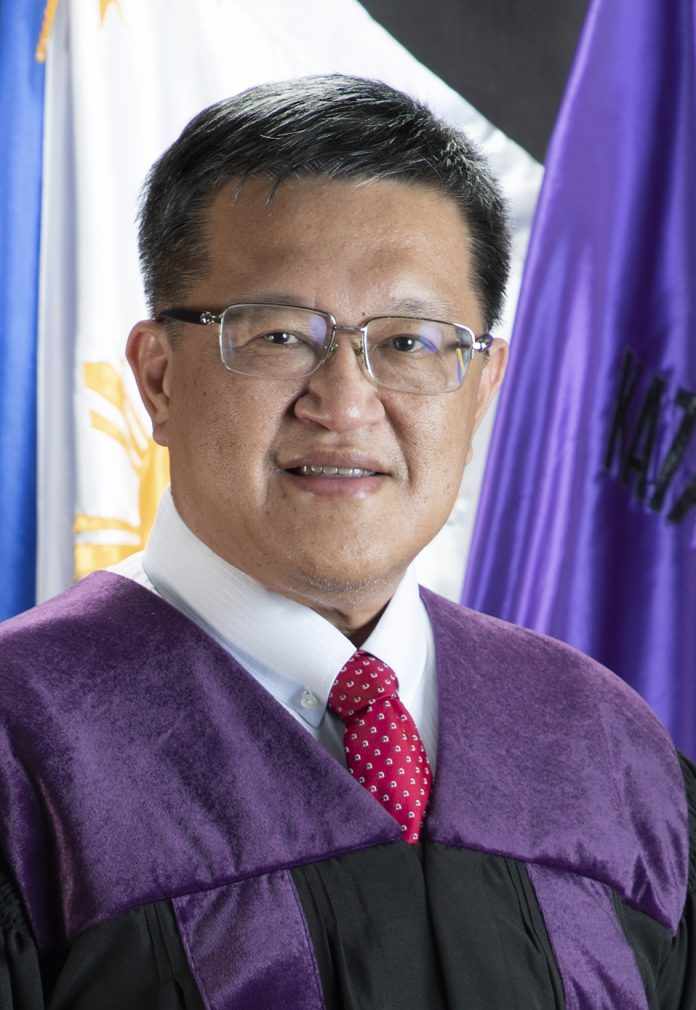
Antonio Kho Jr.,
since February 23, 2022

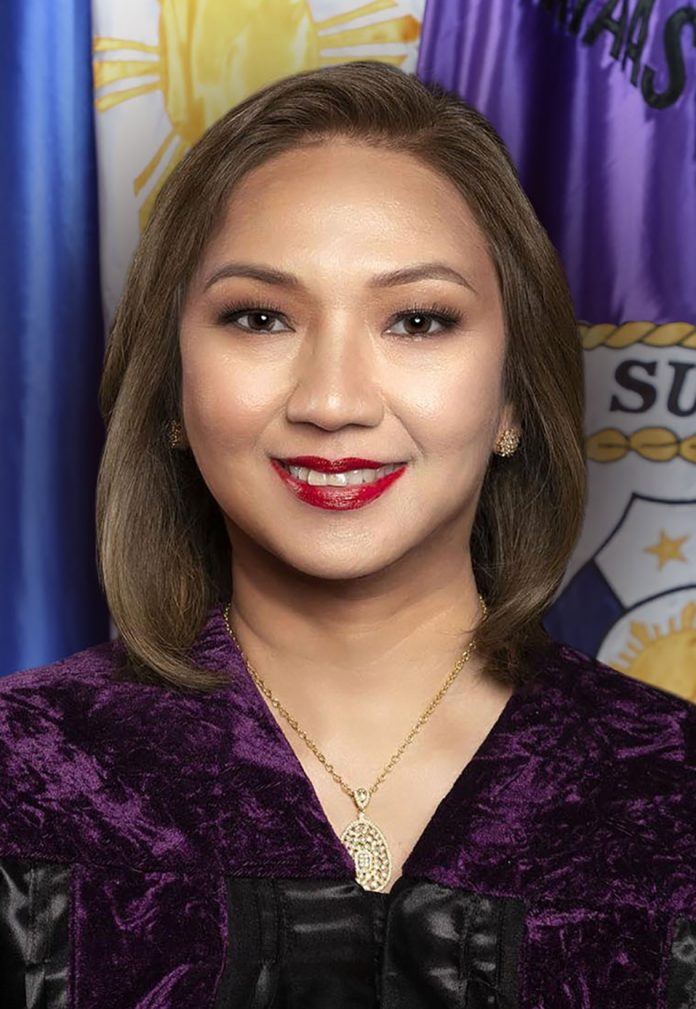
Maria Filomena Singh,
since May 18, 2022

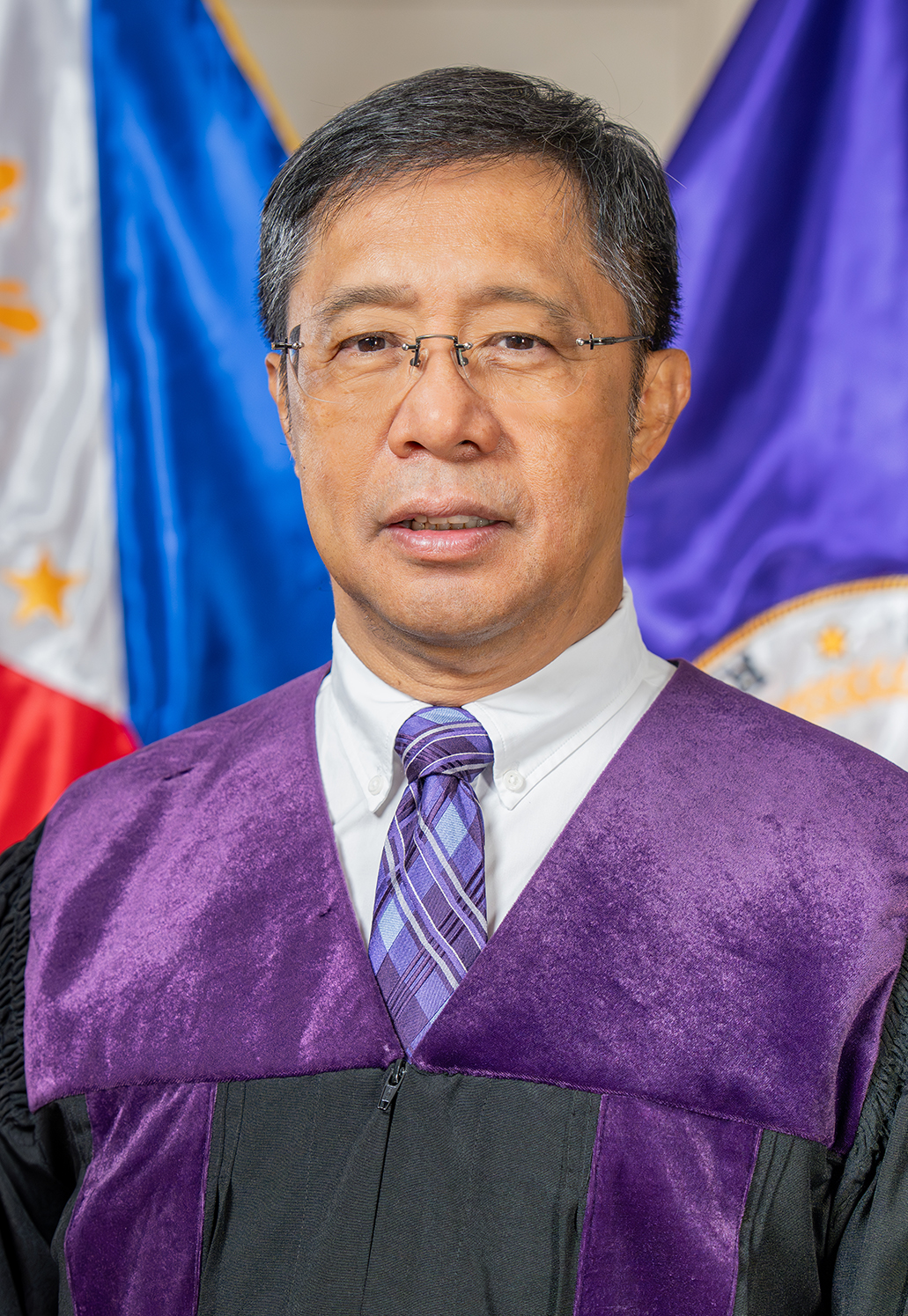
Raul Villanueva, since June 9, 2025

Gamaliel Cordoba, since November 13, 2026

== Constitutional requirements and limitations ==
Under the 1987 Constitution, the minimum requirements for appointment to the Supreme Court are natural born citizenship; 40 years of age; and 15 years or more as a judge of a lower court or engaged in the practice of law in the Philippines. (sec. 7(1), Article VIII) The members of the Court are appointed by the President from a list of at least 3 nominees prepared by the Judicial and Bar Council. (sec. 9, Article VIII) The appointment is not subject to confirmation by Congress.

Members of the Court are mandated to retire upon reaching the age of 70. (sec. 11, Article VIII) They may also be removed from office through impeachment, which is accomplished through a resolution of impeachment affirmed by a 1/3 vote of all members of the House of Representatives and conviction by 2/3 vote of all members of the Senate.

Since 1901, there has always been only one Chief Justice. In contrast, the number of Associate Justices has wildly varied. From the original number of six (1901–1916), this was increased to eight (1916–1935), then to ten (1935–1940). During the years 1940–1945, the membership varied from five to seven. After liberation in 1945, the number was reset to ten, and the current number of fourteen was first set in place with the enactment of the 1973 Constitution. During the first few months of the Aquino administration, ten Associate Justices sat on the Court, but the appointment of Carolina Griño-Aquino in February 1988 finally restored the number of Associate Justices at fourteen.

== Official functions ==
The cases decided by the Supreme Court involve several classes of disputes. Most prominently, the Court is called upon to exercise the power of judicial review of presidential or legislative actions. More often, the Court also undertakes appellate review of decisions of the trial courts and the Court of Appeals in civil and criminal cases. The Court is also tasked with deciding administrative cases involving members and employees of the judiciary and of lawyers belonging to the Philippine Bar. The decisions of the Court become part of the law of the land.

Each Justice carries one vote on the Court which they exercise whether when sitting in Division, or in the full complement of 15 (or "en banc"). Since the 1970s, the Supreme Court has sat in three divisions, with five Justices as members of each division. As most Supreme Court cases are decided by the division rather than the en banc, a vote of three Justices sitting in a division is usually sufficient to decide the case. However, the Constitution prescribes instances whereby a case must be decided en banc, such as in declaring a law as unconstitutional or when a judicial precedent is overturned. Each vote can be crucial, as recently shown in the 2006 People's Initiative case (Lambino v. COMELEC), which was decided en banc by an 8–7 vote.

As a case is decided, one justice in the majority is assigned to write the majority opinion for the Court. Even as these decisions speak in behalf of the Court, the writer of the opinion (known as the "ponente") is strongly identified with the decision, and the body of opinions of each Justice enhances his/her reputation. Many important opinions are analyzed in law schools and are well-remembered long after the Justice had left the Court. For example, several of the opinions of Associate Justice Jose P. Laurel were crucial in the development of Philippine jurisprudence and are widely read and quoted nearly 70 years after they had been written.

Any other Justice, whether they be in the majority or in the minority, is entitled to write a separate opinion in a case to clarify his/her views, or even to challenge the points raised in the majority opinion. In the 1973 case of Javellana v. Executive Secretary, concerning the ratification of the 1973 Constitution, each Justice chose to write a separate opinion, while more recently, the 2005 decision on the Expanded VAT Law (Abakada v. Executive Secretary) saw 11 separate opinions. The separate opinions of a Justice in the majority is usually known as a "concurring opinion", while one penned by a Justice in the minority is known as a "dissenting opinion". A Justice who only partially agrees with the majority opinion while disagreeing with portions thereof may even write a "concurring and dissenting opinion".

While these separate opinions do not receive as much public attention as majority opinions, they are usually studied in the legal academe and by other judges. On several occasions, views expressed in a dissenting or concurring opinion were adopted by the Supreme Court in later years. Justice Gregorio Perfecto, whose staunch libertarian views were out of sync with the Cold War era, wrote over 140 dissenting opinions in just 4 years. Years after his death, some of his views in dissent, such as in Moncado v. People's Court (1948) were adopted by a more liberal Supreme Court.

== The rule of seniority ==
The Associate Justices of the Court are usually ordered according to the date of their appointment. There are no official ramifications as to this ranking, although the order determines the seating arrangement on the bench and is duly considered in all matters of protocol. Within the discretion of the Court, the ranking may also factor into the composition of the divisions of the Court.

In 1986, the order of seniority in the Court was modified upon the assumption to the presidency of Corazon C. Aquino. President Aquino had sought to reorganize the Court by obtaining the resignation of most of the Associate Justices who had been appointed by Ferdinand Marcos, and filling those vacancies with her own choices. Eventually, Aquino chose to re-appoint three Marcos-appointed Justices: Ameurfina A. Melencio-Herrera, Hugo E. Gutierrez, Jr. and Nestor B. Alampay, but did so only after appointing several new Justices to the Court. The previous service of these three were not considered for the purposes of determining seniority. This point would cause a minor controversy in 1992. During that time, it was advocated in some sectors that Herrera, as the longest serving incumbent Associate Justice, was more qualified to succeed the resigned Chief Justice Marcelo B. Fernan than Andres R. Narvasa, who was considered as the Senior Associate Justice despite having been appointed to the Court 7 years after Melencio-Herrera. President Aquino eventually appointed Narvasa over Herrera.

The incumbent Justice with the earliest date of appointment is deemed the Senior Associate Justice. The Senior Associate Justice has no constitutional or statutory duties, but usually acts as Acting Chief Justice during the absence of the Chief Justice. The Senior Associate Justice is also usually designated as the chairperson of the second division of the Court.

The following became Senior Associate Justices in their tenure in the Supreme Court:

* Appointed as Chief Justice
* Elected as President

No.	Senior Associate Justice	Year Appointed	Tenure
1	Florentino Torres	1901	1901–1920
2	Elias Finley Johnson	1903	1920–1933
3	Thomas A. Street	1917	1933–1935
4	George A. Malcolm	1917	June 1, 1935 – January 30, 1936
5	Antonio Villareal	1925	January 20, 1936–June 5, 1940
6	Carlos Imperial	June 22, 1932	June 5, 1940 - May 20, 1941
7	Anacleto Diaz	November 20, 1933	May 20 - December 19, 1941
8	José P. Laurel Sr.	1936	1941–1942
9	Manuel V. Moran	1938	1942–1945
10	Roman Ozaeta	1941	1945–1946
10	Ricardo M. Paras Jr.	December 28, 1941; July 11, 1945	1946–1951
12	Felicisimo R. Feria	1945	1951–1953
13	César F. Bengzon	1945	1953–1961
14	Sabino B. Padilla	1945	1961 – 1964
15	Roberto R. Concepcion	1954	1964–1966
16	Jose B. L. Reyes	1954	1966–1972
17	Querube C. Makalintal	1962	1972–1973
18	Fred Ruiz Castro	1966	1973–1976
19	Enrique M. Fernando Sr.	1967	1976–1979
20	Claudio Teehankee Sr.	1968	1979–1987
21	Vicente Abad Santos	January 17, 1979 resigned on March 4, 1986 reappointed on April 3, 1986	1986
22	Jose Feria	April 7, 1986	April 7, 1986 - January 10, 1987
23	Pedro Yap	April 8, 1986	January 10, 1987 - April 19, 1988
24	Marcelo Fernan	April 9, 1986	April 18, 1988 - July 1, 1988
25	Ameurfina Melencio-Herrera	January 17, 1979 resigned on March 4, 1986; Reappointed on 1986	July 1, 1988–May 11, 1992
26	Hugo Gutierrez Jr.	1982 and 1986	May 11, 1992–March 31, 1993
27	Isagani A. Cruz	1986	March 31, 1993–October 11, 1994
28	Florentino P. Feliciano	1986	October 11, 1994–December 13, 1995
29	Teodoro R. Padilla	1987	December 13, 1995–August 22, 1997
30	Florenz D. Regalado	1988	August 22, 1997–October 13, 1998
31	Flerida Ruth P. Romero	1991	October 13, 1998–August 1, 1999
32	Josue N. Bellosillo	1992	August 1, 1999–November 13, 2003
33	Reynato S. Puno	1993	November 13, 2003–December 7, 2006
34	Leonardo A. Quisumbing	1998	December 7, 2006–November 6, 2009
35	Antonio T. Carpio	2001	November 6, 2009–October 26, 2019
36	Estela M. Perlas-Bernabe	2011	October 26, 2019–May 14, 2022
37	Marvic Leonen	2012	May 14, 2022–present

== Becoming chief justice ==
Only two persons appointed as Chief Justice had not previously served as Associate Justices. These were Cayetano Arellano, the first Chief Justice, and Jose Yulo, the former Speaker of the House of Representatives who was appointed as Chief Justice during the Japanese period. All other Chief Justices, except for Victorino Mapa, were incumbent Associate Justices at the time of their appointment as Chief Justice. Mapa had served as Associate Justice from 1901 to 1913, when he was appointed as Secretary of Justice. Mapa would be appointed as Chief Justice in 1920.

Another tradition, though less stringently observed, was that the most senior Associate Justice would be appointed as Chief Justice upon a permanent vacancy to that post. Deviations from this tradition, especially in recent years, have caused some controversy. Senior Associate Justice Claudio Teehankee, who had emerged as a fervent critic of Ferdinand Marcos, was twice bypassed for Chief Justice by Marcos. More recently, in 2005, the appointment of Artemio Panganiban as Chief Justice over Senior Associate Justice Reynato Puno was also the subject of some controversy. Puno was eventually appointed as Chief Justice in 2006. Another contender for Chief Justice in 2006 was Senator Miriam Defensor Santiago. Had Santiago been appointed Chief Justice, she would have been the first person since Jose Yulo in 1942 to have been appointed Chief without serving as Associate Justice. When Justice Renato Corona assumed as Chief Justice on May 17, 2010, the most senior Associate Justice was Antonio Carpio, who was appointed to the Court in October 2001, 6 months before Corona's own appointment.

== Living former associate justices ==
Rank	Justice	Life dates	Age	Notes
13	Regino C. Hermosisima Jr.	October 18, 1927	99 years, 34 days	Current oldest living former associate justice
28	Minerva Gonzaga-Reyes	September 25, 1931	95 years, 57 days	
36	Santiago M. Kapunan	August 12, 1932	94 years, 101 days	
42	Vicente V. Mendoza	April 5, 1933	93 years, 230 days	
44	Josue N. Bellosillo	November 13, 1933	93 years, 8 days	
50	Jose C. Vitug	July 15, 1934	92 years, 129 days	
59	Hilario Davide Jr.	December 20, 1935	90 years, 336 days	Nineteenth chief justice (1998–2005)
64	Artemio V. Panganiban	December 7, 1936	89 years, 349 days	20th chief justice (2005–2007)
70	Angelina Sandoval-Gutierrez	February 28, 1938	88 years, 266 days	
78	Adolfo S. Azcuna	February 16, 1939	87 years, 278 days	
79	Dante O. Tiñga	May 11, 1939	87 years, 194 days	
82	Consuelo Ynares-Santiago	October 5, 1939	87 years, 47 days	
84	Reynato Puno	May 17, 1940	86 years, 188 days	22nd chief justice (2006–2010)
86	Alicia Austria-Martinez	December 19, 1940	85 years, 337 days	
89	Conchita Carpio-Morales	June 19, 1941	85 years, 155 days	
98	Roberto A. Abad	May 22, 1944	82 years, 183 days	
111	Martin Villarama Jr.	April 14, 1946	80 years, 221 days	
115	Arturo D. Brion	December 29, 1946	79 years, 327 days	
121	Bienvenido L. Reyes	July 6, 1947	79 years, 138 days	
123	Jose C. Mendoza	August 13, 1947	79 years, 100 days	
129	Presbitero Velasco Jr.	August 8, 1948	78 years, 105 days	
134	Teresita Leonardo-de Castro	October 8, 1948	78 years, 44 days	de Jure 24th chief justice (2018)
136	Samuel R. Martires	January 2, 1949	77 years, 323 days	6th Ombudsman of the Philippines (2018-2025)
137	Noel G. Tijam	January 5, 1949	77 years, 320 days	
141	Mariano del Castillo	July 29, 1949	77 years, 115 days	
142	Francis Jardeleza	September 26, 1949	77 years, 56 days	
143	Lucas Bersamin	October 18, 1949	77 years, 34 days	25th chief justice (2018–2019)
144	Antonio Carpio	October 26, 1949	77 years, 26 days	
148	Andres B. Reyes Jr.	May 11, 1950	76 years, 194 days	
150	Jose Reyes Jr.	September 18, 1950	76 years, 64 days	
153	Rosmari Carandang	January 9, 1952	74 years, 316 days	
155	Diosdado Peralta	March 27, 1952	74 years, 239 days	26th chief justice (2019–2021)
156	Estela Perlas-Bernabe	May 14, 1952	74 years, 191 days	
157	Edgardo L. Delos Santos	June 12, 1952	74 years, 162 days	
185	Mario V. Lopez	June 4, 1955	71 years, 170 days	
169	Maria Lourdes Sereno	July 2, 1960	66 years, 142 days	de facto chief justice (2012–2018)

The most recent death of a former justice was that of Bernardo P. Pardo, who died on December 10, 2025, aged 93 years, 302 days.

== See also ==
- Supreme Court of the Philippines
- Chief Justice of the Supreme Court of the Philippines
- Judicial and Bar Council
- Constitution of the Philippines
- Court of Appeals of the Philippines
- Court of Tax Appeals of the Philippines
- Sandiganbayan
