= Jose C. Mendoza =

Filipino judge (born 1947)

The Honorable Jose Catral Mendoza
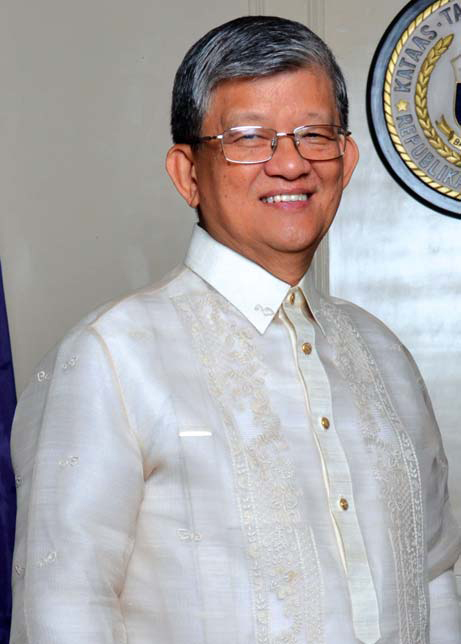

Member of the Judicial and Bar Council for retired Supreme Court justices
- Incumbent
- Assumed office July 20, 2021
- Appointed by: Rodrigo Duterte
- In office October 4, 2017 – July 9, 2021
- Appointed by: Rodrigo Duterte
- Preceded by: Angelina Sandoval-Gutierrez

168th Associate Justice of the Supreme Court of the Philippines
- In office January 4, 2010 – August 13, 2017
- Appointed by: Gloria Macapagal Arroyo
- Preceded by: Minita Chico-Nazario
- Succeeded by: Alexander Gesmundo

Personal details
- Born: August 13, 1947 (age 79) Lipa City, Batangas
- Spouse: Livia Rojas
- Education: San Beda College of Law; University of the Philippines
- Affiliation: Lex Talionis Fraternitas

Jose Catral Mendoza (born August 13, 1947) is a former associate justice of the Supreme Court of the Philippines.

== Legal career ==
A political science graduate of the University of the Philippines, Jose Mendoza took up his law studies in the San Beda College of Law where he led the establishment of Lex Talionis Fraternitas. After passing the 1971 Bar Examinations, the young lawyer engaged in private practice and served as legal counsel of private corporations such as the Philippine Banking Corporation, the Manila Electric Co., and the Gokongwei Group of Companies. He also became a senior consular investigator for the United States Embassy before entering government service as a senior research attorney in the Court of Appeals in 1977.

From 1980 to 1985, he worked as an associate in the Alampay Alvero Alampay Law Office before rejoining the Judiciary in 1985 as a confidential attorney in the Supreme Court, serving under Justices Nestor Alampay and Abdulwahid Bidin.

== Career in the judiciary ==
Mendoza became a member of the Bench in 1989 when he was appointed presiding judge of the Regional Trial Court of Santa Cruz, Laguna. He eventually became the executive judge of the same court in 1992. In 1994, he was designated presiding judge, and later on as executive judge, of the Quezon City Regional Trial Court. After 15 years as a judge, he was appointed Associate Justice of the Court of Appeals on July 4, 2003.

One of his well-known decisions as an appellate justice was the reinstatement of the criminal charges against millionaire businessman Dante Tan, an ally of former President Joseph Estrada who was involved in a stock price manipulation scandal. He also penned the decision approving the petitions for the writ of amparo and the writ of habeas corpus filed by the families of University of the Philippines students Sherlyn Cadapan and Karen Empeño, who were abducted by the members of the military in 2006.

On January 4, 2010, he was appointed Associate Justice of the Supreme Court to replace erstwhile Associate Justice Minita Chico-Nazario.

His first major decision as a member of the Supreme Court was the controversial Biraogo vs. Truth Commission, where he struck down as unconstitutional President Benigno Aquino III's Executive Order No. 1 creating a Truth Commission to investigate corruption during the administration of former President Gloria Macapagal Arroyo. Together with nine of the 15-member tribunal, he invalidated the executive order because of its apparent transgression of the Equal Protection Clause for singling out the Arroyo administration. In his ponencia, Mendoza blatantly tagged Aquino's Truth Commission "as a vehicle for vindictiveness and selective retribution." Justice Mendoza also wrote the high tribunal's decision in Imbong vs. Ochoa striking down as unconstitutional eight major provisions of the highly divisive Reproductive Health Law (RH Law), which was strongly opposed by religious conservatives in the country. Mendoza nonetheless upheld the validity of the remaining provisions of the RH Law despite his strong affiliation with the influential Catholic Church. In his ponencia, the magistrate highlighted the constitutional principle of separation of church and state, stressing that "the church cannot impose its beliefs and convictions on the State and the rest of the citizenry. It cannot demand that the nation follow its beliefs, even if it sincerely believes that they are good for the country."

Legal offices
Preceded by Minita Chico-Nazario	Associate Justice of the Supreme Court; January 4, 2010 – August 13, 2017	Succeeded by Alexander Gesmundo
