= San Beda College of Law =

Law school in the Philippines

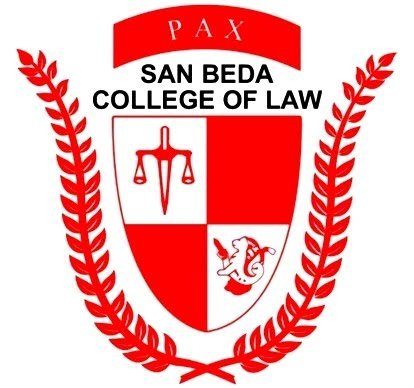
- Motto: Fides, Scientia, Virtus
- Type: Private, Benedictine
- Established: 1948 (College of Law); 2004 (College of Law in Alabang); 2004 (Graduate School of Law)
- Dean: Marciano G. Delson (Manila); Ulpiano P. Sarmiento (Alabang)
- Location: Mendiola Street, San Miguel, Manila, Philippines
- Campus: Mendiola, Manila (Main); Taytay, Rizal; Alabang, Muntinlupa
- Colors: Red and White
- Nickname: San Beda Red Lions
- Mascot: Red Lion
- Website: San Beda Law webpage

San Beda College of Law is the law school of San Beda University, a private, Roman Catholic university run by the Benedictine monks in the Philippines.

The main campus, educational, and administrative offices are located at Mendiola Street in San Miguel, Manila.

== College of Law ==
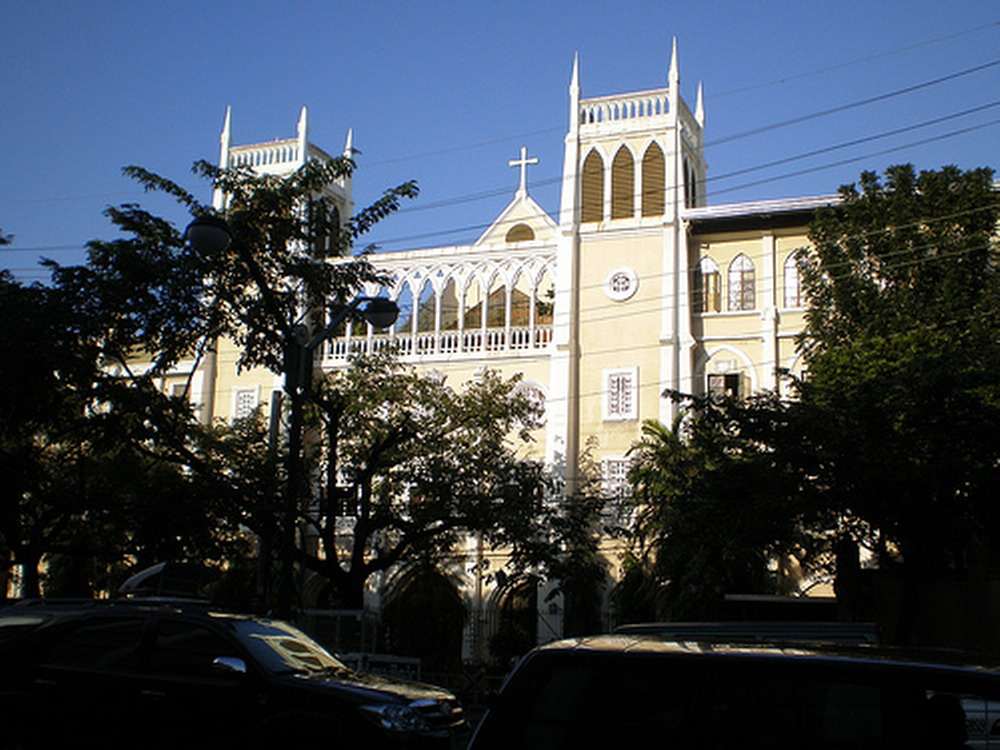
San Beda College Mendiola Campus

The College of Law was founded in 1948. Over the years, it has produced senators, justices of collegiate courts, trial court judges, active lawyers, law professors, and a president. It has also achieved one of the highest bar passing rates and largest number of law graduates among law schools in the country. A famous alumnus, Florenz D. Regalado, is a Retired Justice of the Supreme Court, an established author, and the holder of the highest bar exam grade in the post-war history of the bar exams in the Philippines.

In 2004, San Beda College partnered with the Supreme Court of the Philippines and the Philippine Judicial Academy to establish the Graduate School of Law, an entity that shall offer postgraduate studies on criminal justice and the judicial system in the country.

In the 2007 Bar Examinations, the College of Law got the highest passing percentage among all other law schools at 93.27% for all examinees and 93.18% for first takers.

The San Beda College of Law once again got the highest passing percentage in the 2009 Bar Examination at 94.21%. It also produced two top notchers for the same year; Reinier Paul Yebra and Charlene Mae Tapic placing first and second respectively.

== Graduate School of Law ==
The Graduate School of Law offers three postgraduate degree programs:

- Master of Laws (LL.M.)
- Master of Science in Criminal Justice Administration (M.Sc.Justice Ad.)
- Doctor of the Science of Jurisprudence (S.J.D.)

Program delivery combines classroom sessions held once a month and guided research. Extensive use in some subjects is made of on-line chat-sessions and in others, mentoring. Professors are invited from the senior members of the superior courts of the Philippines as well as from leading academics in law, criminology and related disciplines.

The doctoral program is primarily a research program accrediting work done by the candidate in research and publication, as well as in participation in high-level conferences and symposia in law and jurisprudence.

Upon prior arrangement, the Law Dean and the Faculty may craft customized programs to suit the individual needs of foreign law students.

The Master of Laws (LL.M.) and the Doctor of Science in Jurisprudence (S.J.D.) programs do not require membership in the Philippine Bar. However, as a general rule, students should be members of the Philippine Bar. Exceptional cases are allowed provided the candidate exhibits the level of competence demanded of doctoral programs, and is capable of doing research that will contribute significantly to his chosen field.

== San Beda College Alabang School of Law ==
The San Beda College of Law in Alabang was established in 2004. It serves residents of the southern part of Metro Manila who want to take up law but are too far away

== Notable alumni ==
Executive department

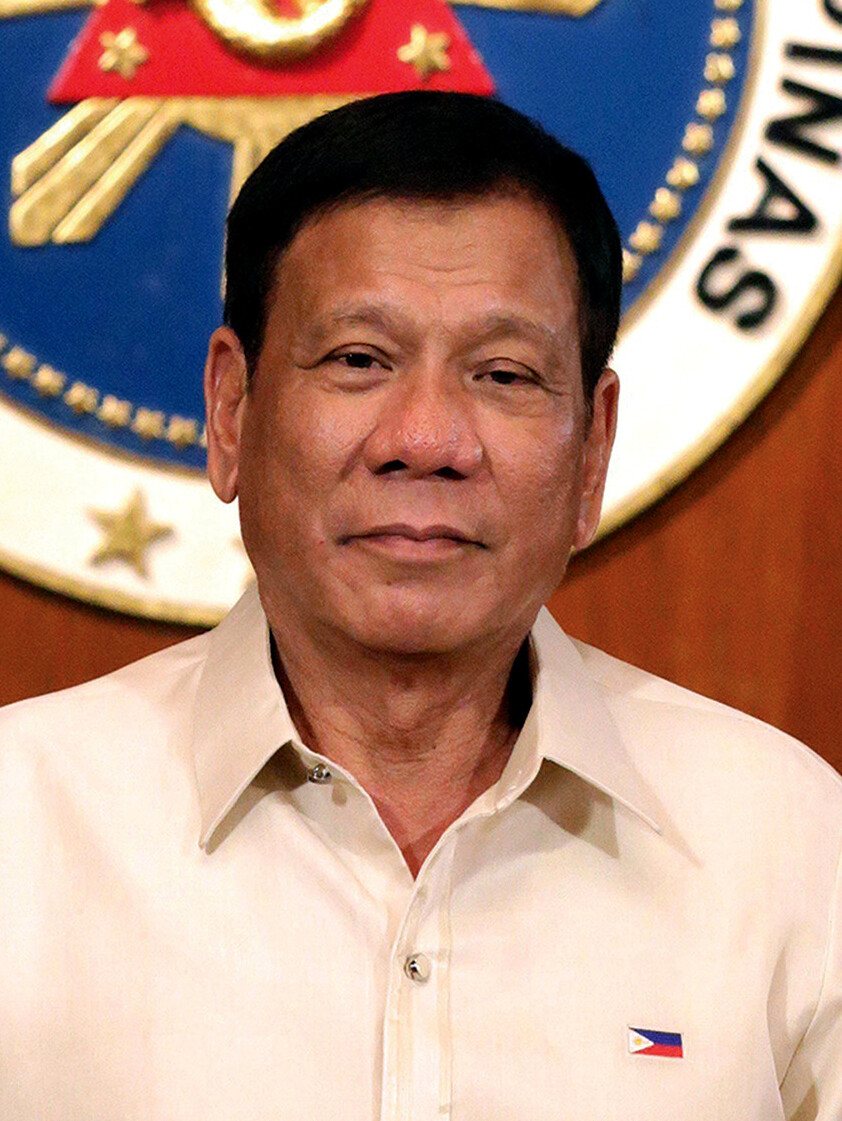
16th President of the Philippines Rodrigo Duterte L'72

- Rodrigo Duterte – 16th President of the Philippines, former Davao City mayor, and Congressman
- Salvador Medialdea – former executive secretary
- Arthur Tugade – former secretary, Department of Transportation
- Vitaliano Aguirre II – former Secretary of Justice, Department of Justice
- Jose Carlitos Z. Licas – former OIC deputy commissioner, Bureau of Immigration

Philippine legislature

- Raul Roco – former senator, former education secretary, and 1998 and 2004 presidential Candidate
- Rene Saguisag – former senator
- Leila de Lima – senator; former secretary, Department of Justice; former Chairperson, Commission on Human Rights
- Ramon V. Mitra – former Speaker of the House of Representatives and 1992 presidential Candidate

Philippine judiciary

- Romeo Callejo Sr. – former associate justice of the Supreme Court of the Philippines
- Samuel R. Martires – associate justice of the Supreme Court of the Philippines
- Jose C. Mendoza – associate justice of the Supreme Court of the Philippines
- Antonio Eduardo Nachura – associate justice of the Supreme Court of the Philippines, former Representative Samar, former solicitor-general
- Florenz D. Regalado – former justice of the Supreme Court of the Philippines, obtained the highest rating in the post-war history of the Philippine Bar Examinations
- Bienvenido L. Reyes – associate justice of the Supreme Court of the Philippines
- Noel G. Tijam – associate justice of the Supreme Court of the Philippines
- Antonio Kho Jr. – associate justice of the Supreme Court of the Philippines
- Pablito Alhambra Perez – associate justice of the Philippine Court of Appeals
- Amparo Cabotaje-Tang – presiding justice of the anti-graft court Sandiganbayan
- Gregory S. Ong – former associate justice of the anti-graft court Sandiganbayan

Constitutional Commission

- Sixto Brillantes – election law expert; chairman, Commission on Elections

Local Government

- Mike Rama - mayor, Cebu City; national president: League of Cities of the Philippines (2022-2025), Vice Mayors League of the Philippines (2008-2010), Philippine Councilors League (1998-2001)
- Edgardo Pamintuan Sr. – former mayor, Angeles City
- Oscar Moreno – mayor, Cagayan de Oro; former governor, Misamis Oriental and former Congressman, 1st District of Misamis Oriental

Academe

- Virgilio B. Jara – Dean of San Beda College of Law, 5th placer in the 1962 Philippine Bar Examinations
- Ulpiano P. Sarmiento III – Dean of the Alabang campus, Member of the House of Representatives

representing educators

- Jose R. Sundiang – former Dean, San Beda College of Law, Arellano Law Foundation

Private law practitioners

- Felito S. Ramirez – 7th placer 1972 Philippine Bar Examination, founding and managing partner of Ramirez Lazaro Bello Rico-Sabado and Associates Law Office, former law professor, San Beda College of Law and Arellano Law Foundation, former politician (Province of Cagayan)
- George A. Eduvala - George A. Eduvala, LTFI Lions 1969 (Founding member), Third place, Bar 1972. LLB cum laude, San Beda College 1972; AB magna cum laude, University of Sto. Tomas 1967, Professor, Arellano University Law College, 1980-1984, 2015-19. Previously, Technical Assistant to SC Justice Felix V. Makasiar, 1973-74; Labor Arbiter 1977-84, Technical Assistant to Labor Secretaries Blas F. Ople, Augusto Sanchez (Bedan), Leonardo Quisumbing, Pat Sto. Tomas, Arturo Brion, 1977-2012; Labor Labor Attaché, 1984-2012.
- Dennis B. Funa – former government official, Constitutionalist, Law Book Author
- William "Billy" Claver – Martial Law-era freedom fighter; indigenous people's rights activist and lawyer
