= Japar Dimaampao =

Filipino judge

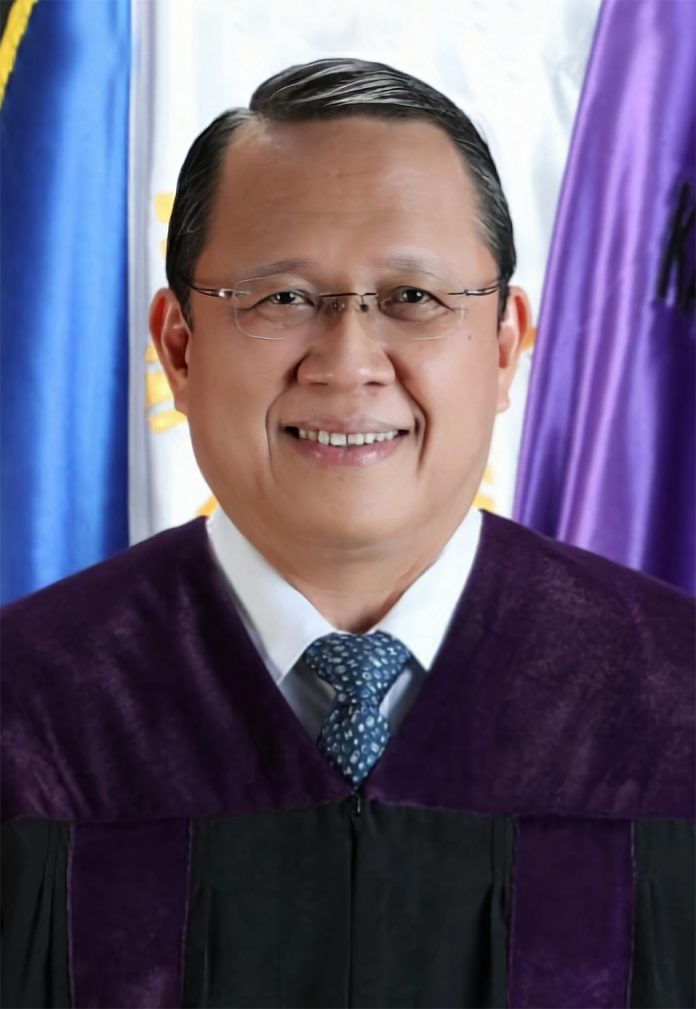
- Dimaampao in December 2022

Associate Justice of the Supreme Court of the Philippines
- Incumbent
- Assumed office July 2, 2021
- Appointed by: Rodrigo Duterte
- Preceded by: Alexander Gesmundo

Justice of the Court of Appeals of the Philippines
- In office March 15, 2004 – July 2, 2021
- Appointed by: Gloria Macapagal-Arroyo
- Preceded by: Alicia Austria-Martinez
- Succeeded by: Eleutherio Bathan

Personal details
- Born: Japar Babay Dimaampao; December 27, 1963 (age 62) Marawi, Lanao del Sur, Philippines
- Spouse: Maria Gina Villapañe
- Education: University of the East College of Law

Japar Babay Dimaampao (born December 27, 1963) is a Filipino judge who has served as an associate justice of the Supreme Court of the Philippines since 2021. He is the second Muslim to be appointed to the High Court after Justice Abdulwahid Bidin.

== Education ==
Dimaampao was born in born December 27, 1963, in Marawi. He obtained his degree in Business Administration major in accounting in 1982 from the University of the East. In 1987, he received his Bachelor of Laws degree from the same university. A certified public accountant, he specializes in commercial and taxation law.

== Career ==
Dimaampao began his legal career as a legal officer of the National Bureau of Investigation, then as senior corporate attorney in the Metropolitan Waterworks and Sewerage System. He also worked as staff in the Commission on Elections where his father, Magdara Dimaampao, was former commissioner. He rose to become the first Muslim senior state prosecutor of the Department of Justice. He was formerly Bar examiner for civil law and taxation law, and also served as chairperson for the 2020 Special Shari’ah Bar Exams.

=== Trial court judge ===
Dimaampao served for four years as judge of the Regional Trial Court of Mandaluyong.

=== Appellate court ===
Dimaampao holds the distinction of being the youngest magistrate to be appointed to the Court of Appeals at the age of 40.

== Associate justice of the Supreme Court ==
On July 2, 2021, President Rodrigo Duterte appointed Dimaampao as the 191st Associate Justice of the Supreme Court. He filled the post vacated by then Supreme Court Associate Justice Alexander Gesmundo, who had been appointed as Chief Justice of the High Court. He is the 191st Associate Justice of the Supreme Court of the Philippines and the second Muslim to be appointed to the High Court after Justice Abdulwahid Bidin of Tawi-Tawi. He took his oath as associate justice on September 14, 2021.

When Mariano del Castillo retired as associate justice in 2019, Dimamampao received support from the Bangsamoro Parliament and majority of Moro representatives in the House of Representatives who campaigned for the Muslim jurist's appointment to the Supreme Court. He has vied for a post in the high court, prior to the Duterte's administration.

== Personal life ==
Dimaampao is married to Maria Gina Perez Villapañe. He is an ethnic Maranao and a Muslim.

On April 25, 2024, the University of the East led by President Zosimo M. Battad, Louie Divinagracia and College of Law Dean Viviana Paguirigan, bestowed Juris Doctor upon Dante Tiñga and Dimaampao at Rizal Park Hotel Grand Ballroom.

== Books ==
- Basic Approach to Income Taxation (Rex Book Store)
- Tax Principles and Remedies (Rex Book Store)
- Bar Essentials in Commercial Law (Central Books)
- Bar Q&A for the Past 10 Years: Taxation Law (Central Books)

Legal offices
Preceded by Alexander Gesmundo	Associate Justice of the Supreme Court of the Philippines; 2021–present	Incumbent
Preceded by Alicia Austria-Martinez	Justice of the Court of Appeals of the Philippines; 2004–2021	Succeeded by Eleutherio Bathan
