= Resign-to-run law =

Election law

A resign-to-run law is a law that requires an elected official to resign from the office they were elected before they can run for a different office. This is distinct from a dual mandate prohibition, where a person has to resign from their old office to assume the new office, rather than to run for the new office. Resign-to-run laws exist in several jurisdictions, including five US states.

== Arguments for and against ==
Supporters of resign-to-run laws argue that a politician running for one office while holding another might neglect the duties of their current office, since they spend much of their time campaigning for the new office. They also believe that in a race between someone who currently holds another office and someone who doesn't, the person who holds another office can unfairly use their incumbency as leverage in the campaign, for example by funnelling official resources into the campaign or by using their office as a fallback in case they lose the race.

An officeholder who wants to run for higher office may time their run to complete their tasks in their current office. An example of this is Rodney Glassman, vice mayor of Tucson, Arizona and Democratic Party candidate in the 2010 United States Senate election in Arizona, who delayed his resignation from the city council and his Senate campaign announcement until the city's budget was completed.

Opponents say that resign-to-run laws are likely to harm people who have public service as a job, since these people might not be in a good enough financial position to resign from their current office if they want to run for another office. People who want to hold a particular office might also be dissuaded from running for lower offices beforehand, as holding lower offices would block them from running for their desired office and serve as a hindrance instead of a stepping stone.

== Examples ==
=== Philippines ===
Under the Omnibus Election Code, appointive officials (i.e. public servants who are not elected) are considered ipso facto resigned once they file a Certificate of Candidacy (COC) with the Commission on Elections (COMELEC). The Supreme Court affirmed that distinction in Quinto v. COMELEC: the automatic resignation rule for appointive officials was upheld, while elective officials were exempted. The rationale is that civil service (appointive) positions are supposed to remain non-partisan, so once an appointive officer files to run, to avoid conflict with partisan activity, they are deemed resigned. Elective officeholders already engage in politics by nature of their role.

In 2024, the Supreme Court issued a temporary restraining order against a COMELEC rule that allows appointed public officials to be considered resigned once they join a party-list race.

=== South Korea ===
Article 53 of the Public Official Election Act of the Republic of Korea stipulates that public officials resign from their positions 90 days before the election, except when National Assembly's member, local lawmakers and heads of local governments run for re-election and when National Assembly's members run for president. However, if a proportional representation member election, a by-election, National Assembly's member's candidacy for local elections, or a local council member runs for an election of a member of another local council or head of another local government, they must resign 30 days before the election.

=== United States ===
The American Bar Association Model Code of Judicial Conduct requires judges who run for nonjudicial elective office to resign from their judicial position before they become candidates. Thirty-seven U.S. jurisdictions have adopted this Code.

==== Arizona ====
Section 38-296 of the Arizona Revised Statutes, entitled "Limitation upon filing for election by incumbent of elective office" states:

1. Except during the final year of the term being served, no incumbent of a salaried elective office, whether holding by election or appointment, may offer himself for nomination or election to any salaried local, state or federal office.
2. An incumbent of a salaried elected office shall be deemed to have offered himself for nomination or election to a salaried local, state or federal office on the filing of a nomination paper pursuant to section 16-311, subsection A. An incumbent of a salaried elected office is not deemed to have offered himself for nomination or election to an office by making a formal declaration of candidacy for the office.
- Note: Changes passed by the legislature in 2013 allow elected officials to publicly announce their candidacy for another office. Previously, they had to hide their intentions from voters, as they would have had to resign upon formally announcing candidacy for a different office. Now they do not have to resign their current office unless they file formal nominating papers and are not in their final year of office. The text above reflects these changes.

==== Florida ====
Section 99.012 of the Florida Statutes states: "No officer may qualify as a candidate for another public office, whether state, district, county or municipal, if the terms or any part thereof run concurrently with each other, without resigning from the office he or she presently holds." The Florida law permits an office-holder to make their resignation effective the day they would assume the new office if elected.

In 1970, the US District Court for the Northern District of Florida ruled that Florida's resign-to-run law could not be applied to candidates running for Congress. The court found that the law violated Article 1, Section 2, Clause 2, of the Constitution by providing an additional qualification not provided by the Constitution for election to Congress. That same year, in a separate case, Supreme Court Justice Hugo Black questioned the constitutionality of the same statute.

In late 2022, some Republican leaders of the Legislature, signaled that they might change the law so governor Ron DeSantis could run in the 2024 United States presidential election. On April 28, 2023, the Republican-led legislature passed a change to the law that provided an exception to the resign-to-run law for any Florida official that runs in a presidential election. On May 24, 2023, DeSantis signed that bill.

==== Georgia ====
Article II, Section 2, Paragraph V of the 1983 Constitution of Georgia reads: "The office of any state, county, or municipal elected official shall be declared vacant upon such elected official qualifying, in a general primary or general election, or special primary or special election, for another state, county, or municipal elective office or qualifying for the House of Representatives or the Senate of the United States if the term of the office for which such official is qualifying for begins more than 30 days prior to the expiration of such official's present term of office."

==== Hawaii ====
In 1978, Article II, Section 7 was added to the Constitution of Hawaii to include resign-to-run: "Any elected public officer shall resign from that office before being eligible as a candidate for another public office, if the term of the office sought begins before the end of the term of the office held."

==== Texas ====
Article 16, Section 65(b) of the Constitution of Texas states: "If any of the officers named herein shall announce their candidacy, or shall in fact become a candidate, in any General, Special or Primary Election, for any office of profit or trust under the laws of this State or the United States other than the office then held, at any time when the unexpired term of the office then held shall exceed one year and 30 days, such announcement or such candidacy shall constitute an automatic resignation of the office then held, and the vacancy thereby created shall be filled pursuant to law in the same manner as other vacancies for such office are filled."

The "officers named herein" are listed in Article 16, Section 65(a):

- District Clerks
- County Clerks
- County Judges
- Judges of the County Courts at Law
- Judges of the County Criminal Courts
- Judges of the County Probate Courts
- Judges of the County Domestic Relations Courts
- County Treasurers
- Criminal District Attorneys
- County Surveyors
- County Commissioners
- Justices of the Peace
- Sheriffs
- Assessors and Collectors of Taxes
- District Attorneys
- County Attorneys
- Public Weighers
- Constables

Tex. Elec. Code § 145.001(e) permits a person to run for office and simultaneously be a candidate for president or vice president of the United States. This statute permitted Lyndon B. Johnson to run for vice president in 1960 and, at the same time, seek re-election as United States Senator from Texas. Lloyd Bentsen took advantage of the same provision in 1988 when he was the vice presidential running mate of Michael Dukakis.

== See also ==
- Cursus honorum
- Dual mandate
- Incumbent#Incumbency advantage
