= Disini v. Secretary of Justice =

Landmark ruling of the Supreme Court of the Philippines

- Court: Supreme Court of the Philippines en banc

Full case name
- Jose Jesus M. Disini, Jr., Rowena S. Disini, Lianne Ivy P. Medina, Janette Toral and Ernesto Sonido, Jr., vs. the Secretary of Justice, the Secretary of the Department of the Interior and Local Government, the Executive Director of the Information and Communications Technology Office, the Chief of the Philippine National Police and the Director of the National Bureau of Investigation
Fourteen consolidated petitions
Louis "Barok" C. Biraogo v. National Bureau of Investigation and Philippine National Police (G.R. No. 203299)
Alab ng Mamamahayag (Alam), Hukuman ng Mamamayan Movement, Inc., Jerry S. Yap, Berteni "Toto" Causing, Hernani Q. Cuare, Percy Lapid, Tracy Cabrera, Ronaldo E. Renta, Cirilo P. Sabarre, Jr., Dervin Castro, et al., v. Office of the President, represented by President Benigno Simeon Aquino III, Senate of the Philippines, and House of Representatives (G.R. No. 203306)
Sen. Teofisto Guingona III v. Executive Secretary, the Secretary of Justice, the Secretary of the Department of Interior and Local Government, the Chief of the Philippine National Police, and Director of the National Bureau of Investigation (G.R. No. 203359)
Alexander Adonis, Ellen Tordesillas, Ma. Gisela Ordenes-Cascolan, H. Harry L. Roque, Jr., Romel R. Bagares, and Gilbert T. Andres v. the Executive Secretary, the Department of Budget and Management, the Department of Justice, the Department of the Interior and Local Government, the National Bureau of Investigation, the Philippine National Police, and the Information and Communications Technology Office-Department of Science and Technology (G.R. No. 203378)
Hon. Raymond V. Palatino, Hon. Antonio Tinio, Vencer Mari Crisostomo of Anakbayan, Ma. Katherine Elona of the Philippine Collegian, Isabelle Therese Baguisi of the National Union of Students of the Philippines, et al. v. Paquito N. Ochoa, Jr., in his capacity as Executive Secretary and Alter-Ego of President Benigno Simeon Aquino III, and Leila de Lima in her capacity as Secretary of Justice (G.R. No. 203391)
Bagong Alyansang Makabayan Secretary General Renato M. Reyes, Jr., National Artist Bienvenido L. Lumbera, Chairperson of Concerned Artists of the Philippines, Elmer C. Labog, Chairperson of Kilusang Mayo Uno, Cristina E. Palabay, Secretary General of Karapatan, Ferdinand R. Gaite, Chairperson of Courage, Joel B. Maglunsod, Vice President of Anakpawis Party-List, Lana R. Linaban, Secretary General Gabriela Women's Party, Adolfo Ares P. Gutierrez, and Julius Garcia Matibag v. Benigno Simeon C. Aquino III, President of the Republic of the Philippines, Paquito N. Ochoa, Jr., Executive Secretary, Senate of the Philippines, represented by Senate President Juan Ponce Enrile, House of Representatives, represented by Speaker Feliciano Belmonte, Jr., Leila de Lima, Secretary of the Department of Justice, Louis Napoleon C. Casambre, Executive Director of the Information and Communications Technology Office, Nonnatus Caesar R. Rojas, Director of the National Bureau of Investigation, D/Gen. Nicanor A. Bartolome, Chief of the Philippine National Police, Manuel A. Roxas II, Secretary of the Department of the Interior and Local Government (G.R. No. 203407)
Melencio S. Sta. Maria, Sedfrey M. Candelaria, Amparita Sta. Maria, Ray Paolo J. Santiago, Gilbert V. Sembrano, and Ryan Jeremiah D. Quan (all of the Ateneo Human Rights Center) v. Honorable Paquito Ochoa in his capacity as Executive Secretary, Honorable Leila de Lima in her capacity as Secretary of Justice, Honorable Manuel Roxas in his capacity as Secretary of the Department of Interior and Local Government, the Chief of the Philippine National Police, the Director of the National Bureau of Investigation (all of the Executive Department of Government) (G.R. No. 203440)
National Union of Journalists of the Philippines, Philippine Press Institute, Center for Media Freedom and Responsibility, Rowena Carranza Paraan, Melinda Quintos-De Jesus, Joseph Alwyn Alburo, Ariel Sebellino and the Petitioners in the ePetition http://www.nujp.org/no-to-ra10175/ v. the Executive Secretary, the Secretary of Justice, the Secretary of the Interior and Local Government, the Secretary of Budget and Management, the Director General of the Philippine National Police, the Director of the National Bureau of Investigation, the Cybercrime Investigation and Coordinating Center, and all Agencies and Instrumentalities of Government and all Persons Acting Under their Instructions, Orders, Direction in Relation to the Implementation of Republic Act No. 10175 (G.R. No. 203453)
Paul Cornelius T. Castillo and Ryan D. Andres v. the Hon. Secretary of Justice and the Hon. Secretary of Interior and Local Government (G.R. No. 203454)
Anthony Ian M. Cruz; Marcelo R. Landicho; Benjamin Noel A. Espina; Marck Ronald C. Rimorin; Julius D. Rocas; Oliver Richard V. Robillo; Aaron Erick A. Lozada; Gerard Adrian P. Magnaye; Jose Reginald A. Ramos; Ma. Rosario T. Juan; Brendalyn P. Ramirez; Maureen A. Hermitanio; Kristine Joy S. Rementilla; Maricel O. Gray; Julius Ivan F. Cabigon; Benralph S. Yu; Cebu Bloggers Society, Inc. President Ruben B. Licera, Jr; and Pinoy Expat/OFW Blog Awards, Inc. Coordinator Pedro E. Rahon v. his Excellency Benigno S. Aquino III, in his capacity as President of the Republic of the Philippines; Senate of the Philippines, represented by Hon. Juan Ponce Enrile, in his capacity as Senate President; House of Representatives, represented by Feliciano R. Belmonte, Jr., in his capacity as Speaker of the House of Representatives; Hon. Paquito N. Ochoa, Jr., in his capacity as Executive Secretary; Hon. Leila M. de Lima, in her capacity as Secretary of Justice; Hon. Louis Napoleon C. Casambre, in his capacity as Executive Director, Information and Communications Technology Office; Hon. Nonnatus Caesar R. Rojas, in his capacity as Director, National Bureau of Investigation; and P/DGen. Nicanor A. Bartolome, in his capacity as Chief, Philippine National Police (G.R. No. 203469)
Philippine Bar Association, Inc. v. His Excellency Benigno S. Aquino III, in his official capacity as President of the Republic of the Philippines; Hon. Paquito N. Ochoa, Jr., in his official capacity as Executive Secretary; Hon. Leila M. de Lima, in her official capacity as Secretary of Justice; Louis Napoleon C. Casambre, in his official capacity as Executive Director, Information and Communications Technology Office; Nonnatus Caesar R. Rojas, in his official capacity as Director of the National Bureau of Investigation; and Director General Nicanor A. Bartolome, in his official capacity as Chief of the Philippine National Police (G.R. No. 203501)
Bayan Muna Rep. Neri J. Colmenares v. The Executive Secretary Paquito Ochoa, Jr. (G.R. No. 203509)
National Press Club of the Philippines, Inc. represented by Benny D. Antiporda in his capacity as President and in his personal capacity v. Office of the President, Pres. Benigno Simeon Aquino III, Department of Justice, Department of Interior and Local Government, Philippine National Police, National Bureau of Investigation, Department of Budget and Management and all Other Government Instrumentalities who have Hands in the Passage and/or Implementation of Republic Act 10175 (G.R. No. 203515)
Philippine Internet Freedom Alliance, composed of Dakila–Philippine Collective for Modern Heroism, represented by Leni Velasco, Partido Lakas Ng Masa, represented by Cesar S. Melencio, Francis Euston R. Acero, Marlon Anthony Romasanta Tonson, Teodoro A. Casiño, Noemi Lardizabal-Dado, Imelda Orales, James Matthew B. Miraflor, Juan G.M. Ragragio, Maria Fatima A. Villena, Medardo M. Manrique, Jr., Lauren Dado, Marco Vittoria Tobias Sumayao, Irene Chia, Erastus Noel T. Delizo, Cristina Sarah E. Osorio, Romeo Factolerin, Naomi L. Tupas, Kenneth Keng, Ana Alexandra C. Castro v. The Executive Secretary, the Secretary of Justice, the Secretary of Interior and Local Government, the Secretary of Science and Technology, the Executive Director of the Information Technology Office, the Director of the National Bureau of Investigation, the Chief, Philippine National Police, the Head of the Doj Office of Cybercrime, and the Other Members of the Cybercrime Investigation and Coordinating Center (G.R. No. 203518)
- Decided: February 18, 2014
- Citation: 727 Phil. 28

Case history
- Prior action(s): None, Supreme Court was first instance of all fifteen consolidated petitions
- Subsequent action(s): Motion for reconsideration denied April 22, 2014

Case opinions
- Majority: 12; Roberto Abad (ponente), Maria Lourdes Sereno (also filed concurrence), Antonio Carpio (also filed concurrence), Teresita Leonardo-De Castro, Diosdado Peralta, Mariano del Castillo, Jose Portugal Perez, Bienvenido Reyes, Arturo Brion (also filed concurrence, but dissented at time of reconsideration), Lucas Bersamin, Martin Villarama Jr., Jose Catral Mendoza (joined Brion's concurrence); Dissented: 1 Marvic Leonen; Abstained: 1 Estela Perlas-Bernabe; Recused: 1 Presbitero Velasco Jr.

Court membership
- Chief Justice: Maria Lourdes Sereno

Disini v. Secretary of Justice, 727 Phil. 28 (2014), is a landmark ruling of the Supreme Court of the Philippines handed down on February 18, 2014. When the Congress of the Philippines passed the Cybercrime Prevention Act of 2012 the bill was immediately controversial, especially its strict penalties for the new crime of "cyberlibel", an upgraded form of the already existing criminal libel charge found in the Revised Penal Code of the Philippines.

In the end, the Court declared that most of the law, including the cyberlibel provision, was constitutional. The ruling's abridgement of free expression has been widely criticized by critics of the law, including then attorney Harry Roque. The decision reached in Disini paved the way for the anti-fake news provisions of the Bayanihan to Heal as One Act.

== Petition ==
Several petitions were almost immediately submitted to the Supreme Court questioning the constitutionality of the Act upon its signing, including the petition of Jose Jesus M. Disini, Jr. on September 25, a Harvard-educated lawyer and law professor at the University of the Philippines College of Law from whose name the title of the case derives.

== Initial deferment and protests ==
On October 2, the Supreme Court initially chose to defer action on the petitions, citing an absence of justices, which prevented the Court from sitting en banc. The initial lack of a temporary restraining order meant that the law went into effect as scheduled on October 3. In protest, Filipino netizens reacted by blacking out their Facebook profile pictures and trending the hashtag #NoToCybercrimeLaw on Twitter. Anonymous also defaced government websites, including those of the Bangko Sentral ng Pilipinas, the Metropolitan Waterworks and Sewerage System, and the Intellectual Property Office.

== Temporary restraining order ==
On October 8, 2012, the Supreme Court decided to issue a temporary restraining order (TRO), pausing implementation of the law for 120 days. In early December 2012, the government requested the lifting of the TRO, which was denied. The TRO consolidated all fifteen petitions filed up to that point into one case.

== Oral arguments ==
Oral argument by the petitioners
On January 15, the petitioners, including but not limited to Disini, Jr., participated in an oral argument before the Supreme Court in the case of Disini v. Secretary of Justice.

Oral argument by the respondents
On January 29, the respondents, that is to say, the sued government agencies collectively represented by the Office of the Solicitor General, participated in an oral argument before the Supreme Court in the case of Disini v. Secretary of Justice. Francis Jardeleza, the then-Solicitor General, personally responded, and begins speaking at 4 minutes 33 seconds.

Over four hours of oral arguments by petitioners were heard on January 15, 2013, followed by a three-hour rebuttal by the Office of the Solicitor General, representing the government, on January 29, 2013. This was the first time in Philippine history that oral arguments were uploaded online by the Supreme Court.

== Ruling ==
On February 18, 2014, in a ruling penned by justice Roberto Abad, the Supreme Court ruled 12–1–2 that most of the law was constitutional, although it struck down other provisions, including the ones that violated double jeopardy. In total, §4(c)(3), §5 (only in relation to §4(c)(2), §4(c)(3), and §4(c)(4)), §7 (only in relation to sections §4(c)(2) and §4(c)(4)), §12, and §19 were struck down by the Court as unconstitutional.

Notably, "likes" and "retweets" of libelous content, originally themselves also criminalized as libel under the law, were found to be legal, and this was the only instance in which the court modified the interpretation of section 4(c)(4). Only justice Marvic Leonen dissented from the ruling, writing that he believes the whole idea of criminal libel to be unconstitutional, and assailing the Court for not finding so.

Of note also was the Court's justification for the higher penalties given to cybercrimes, such as prisión mayor (six to twelve years in prison) for cyberlibel:

There exists a substantial distinction between crimes committed through the use of information and communications technology and similar crimes committed using other means. In using the technology in question, the offender often evades identification and is able to reach far more victims or cause greater harm. The distinction, therefore, creates a basis for higher penalties for cybercrimes.

The Court's ruling also puts the burden of proof for whether or not there was malice on the defendant rather than the petitioner, even if the petitioner is a public figure. In his dissent in part, justice Antonio Carpio called this provision "clearly repugnant to the Constitution."

=== Motion for reconsideration ===
While motions for reconsideration were immediately filed by numerous petitioners, including the Center for Media Freedom and Responsibility, they were all rejected with finality on April 22, 2014. However, justice Arturo Brion, who originally wrote a separate concurring opinion, changed his vote to dissent after reconsidering whether it was just to impose higher penalties for cyberlibel than for regular libel.

== See also ==
- People of the Philippines v. Santos, Ressa and Rappler
