= Mario Lopez (jurist) =

Filipino judge

The Honorable Mario Lopez
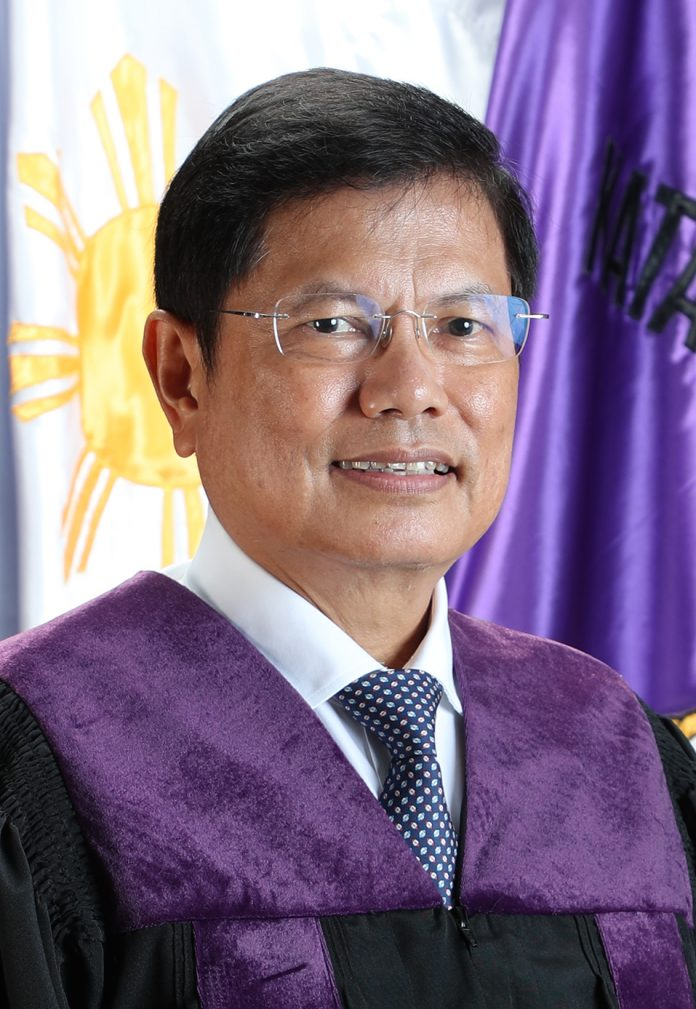
- Lopez in December 2022

Associate Justice of the Supreme Court of the Philippines
- In office December 3, 2019 – June 4, 2025
- Appointed by: Rodrigo Duterte
- Preceded by: Francis Jardeleza
- Succeeded by: Raul Villanueva

Justice of the Court of Appeals of the Philippines
- In office May 31, 2006 – December 3, 2019
- Appointed by: Gloria Macapagal-Arroyo
- Preceded by: Eloy Bello Jr.
- Succeeded by: Alfonso Ruiz II

Personal details
- Born: Mario Villamor Lopez; June 4, 1955 (age 71) La Union, Luzon, Philippines
- Education: San Beda College of Law (LLB); University of Santo Tomas (LLM)

Mario Villamor Lopez (born June 4, 1955) is a former associate justice of the Supreme Court of the Philippines who served from 2019 to 2025. He was appointed by President Rodrigo Duterte to replace Francis Jardeleza on December 3, 2019.

== Education ==
Lopez earned a law degree from San Beda College. He later earned a Master of Laws from the University of Santo Tomas.

== Career ==
He served as prosecutor of the Tanodbayan, now known as the office of the Ombudsman in 1985 and became executive judge of Batangas City in 1997 before his appointment to the Court of Appeals.

=== Supreme Court appointment ===
Lopez had first interviewed for the seat vacated by Noel Tijam. Mariano del Castillo which was later filled by Rodil Zalameda. On December 3, 2019, Lopez was appointed to the court to fill the seat vacated by Francis Jardeleza.

== Personal life ==
Mario V. Lopez is from La Union.

Legal offices
Preceded by Francis Jardeleza	Associate Justice of the Supreme Court; 2019–2025	Succeeded by Raul Villanueva
