= Janette Toral =

Filipino e-commerce and social media specialist, educator, and entrepreneur

- Occupations: Trainer, writer, SEO consultant, blogger, lobbyist, and entrepreneur.
- Notable work: Blogging from Home, DigitalFilipino.com E-Commerce Workshop E-Book, DigitalFilipino: An E-Commerce Guide for the eFilipino
- Website: janettetoral.com

Janette Toral is a Filipino e-commerce, social media, and Internet marketing specialist. She is also a facilitator, lobbyist, entrepreneur, researcher, writer, and ambassador. She has been dubbed "the mother of e-commerce law in the Philippines".

== Advocacy ==
Toral is an active volunteer working on the Philippines E-Commerce Roadmap (2016 to 2020), presenting it in various local and international forums for various stakeholder consultation initiatives. Toral was one of the plaintiffs in the 2014 landmark case Disini v. Secretary of Justice.

== Business interests ==
Toral founded the Philippine Internet Commerce Society in 1997. She lobbied for the Y2K Law and E-Commerce Law which were eventually passed in the year 2000, making it easier for companies in the Philippines to do online businesses globally.

Toral's personal website, DigitalFilipino.com, was founded in September 1999, to promote her e-commerce book and Philippine internet documentary.

She started the DigitalFilipino Club in 2003, also to promote her second e-commerce book and Philippine internet documentary.

In 2006, Toral created the DigitalFilipino.com Podcast, co-produced with Pocholo Gonzales of Creative Voices Productions, which had 13 episodes.

In 2007, she launched the DigitalFilipino Web Awards, which, with different categories, is given yearly to the best Filipino websites.

Since 2003, Toral has also been writing a weekly business column for Sun.Star Cebu.

== Writings ==
=== The DigitalFilipino Stats Report ===
Toral first published the Digital Filipino Stat report in 2002. The issues spoke about the importance of IT to users.

The third of a series of regular survey results of DigitalFilipino in 2002 shows that the internet has grown in importance to users. Internet users in the Philippines seem to have shifted from toy and communication services to research and business tools. The survey allows entrepreneurs to make more important decisions in their strategies and operations on the services offered.

Over 40% of those surveyed said that the internet was used for research. Twenty percent said that email was the main reason for using the internet. 60% were accessing the internet in their place of work, and were not limited to big companies alone but had spread to small and medium enterprises. All these users were also shopping online. This issue is concerned mainly with the use of the internet and shopping behavior online.

The second issue speaks of mobile phone users in the Philippines, which is considered as a wireless champion due to the acceptance of users in the short messaging service (SMS). Almost 17% of Filipinos have prepaid or postpaid subscriptions to mobile services. Telecom providers all over Asia have used the Philippines as a model in the development of added services on SMS usage.

The fourth issue talks about the latest in e-services. According to Toral's latest survey in 2003, Secretary Manuel Roxas had been the best evangelist in promoting the outsourcing industry, referring to e-services like contact centers and medical transcriptions. According to the stats report, 21% of those surveyed were satisfied with the support that the government was giving the e-service industry. They were also satisfied with the efforts given to improve the quality of education and skilled workers, the opening of IT parks, and with the incentives provided for related campaigns on IT.

Another issue of the 2003 DigitalFilipino Stats Report, entitled "The Filipino Internet banker," states that more than half a million Filipinos would regularly bank online. Convenience, time, and resource saving were the principal factors for using online banking services, which included inquiries on accounts, transfer of funds, and payment of bills. Most internet users banking online were young, 68% being males. Internet banking has become an effective tool in acquiring clients who are ready to spend money.

==== Other writings and publications ====
Year	Publishing
June 2025	Smarter with AI: A Confidence-Building Guide for Using Artificial Intelligence in Business and Everyday Work (ISBN 978-0980506112).
2009	Blogging from Home(speaks of blogging trend in the Philippines. The blogging community has grown, the blog contents are cause-oriented, and the people can find information here where they can't get anywhere else)
September 2004	Editor of the Philippine Internet Review project documenting 10 years of the Internet in the Philippines
May 2004	Published the DigitalFilipino.com E-Commerce Workshop E-Book printed edition through McGraw-Hill Education Asia.
June 2002	Published the 1st IT-focused Statistics publication with DigitalFilipino StatsReport
2000	"The Electronic Commerce Act and Its Implementing Rules and Regulations Annotations"
June 2000	"The DigitalFilipino: An E-Commerce Guide for the eFilipino"
September 1999	Published the 1st E-Commerce research website in the Philippines with DigitalFilipino.com

== Awards ==
Date	Award	Notes
2011	Recognized as a promising woman leader in entrepreneurship and technology (US Embassy)	Toral was sent to the US as part of the professional exchange program, International Visitors Leadership Program, by the US State Department, which was hosted by the World Affairs Council of Seattle.
March 5, 2010	Champion of Philippine Internet and E-Commerce Hall of Fame Award	Given by Asian Institute of E-Commerce:“for offering all her life towards the advancement of E-Commerce and Digital Media education and policy improvement in the Philippines”.
October 2009	Digital Elder	Special award given by Globe-2009 Philippine Blog Awards
February 2008	E-Services Awards 2008 – Policy and Legal Category	
November 2004	International Schools Cyberfair Ambassador Award 2004	
May 2002	International Schools Cyberfair Ambassador Award 2002	
