= Krivenko v. Register of Deeds =

- Court: Supreme Court of the Philippines en banc

Full case name
- Alexander A. Krivenko vs. the Register of Deeds, City of Manila
- Decided: November 15, 1947
- Citation: 79 Phil. 461 (G.R. No. L-630)
- Ponente: Manuel Moran, joined by Felicisimo Feria
- Concurrence: Gregorio Perfecto
- Concurrence: Emilio Y. Hilado
- Concurrence: Manuel C. Briones
- Dissent: Ricardo Paras
- Dissent: Pedro Tuazon
- Dissent: Sabino B. Padilla
- Dissent: César Bengzon

Alexander A. Krivenko v. The Register of Deeds, City of Manila (G.R. No. L-630) was a landmark case decided by the Philippine Supreme Court, which further solidified the prohibition of the Philippine Constitution that aliens may not acquire private or public agricultural lands, including residential lands. The decision was promulgated on November 15, 1947.

This was the outcome of the petition by Alexander Krivenko, a Russian citizen, who bought a residential land in Manila, Philippines in December 1941. However, he failed to register the same due to Japan's declaration of war.

Later on in May 1945, he again sought the registration of the same land but the herein respondent, Register of Deeds, denied the application because as an alien, Krivenko was disqualified to own land pursuant to the laws of the Philippine jurisdiction. Krivenko brought the case to the Court of First Instance of Manila which sustained the refusal of the Register of Deeds of Manila. He then appealed to the Supreme Court.

During the pendency of the appeal, a new circular by the Department of Justice was released, instructing all registers of deeds to accept for registration all transfers of residential lots to aliens. With the effect of the circular swaying in his favor, Krivenko thereafter filed a motion to withdraw his appeal. However, the Supreme Court deemed it best to exercise its discretionary powers and denied Krivenko's appeal, in order to tackle the more pressing constitutional issue; and in the process, established itself as a landmark case with regard to foreign ownership of lands in the Philippines.

== Issues ==
There are two material issues in this case.

- The first involves the substantive issue of whether or not a conveyance of a residential land to aliens infringes Section 5, Article XIII of the Constitution.

The above-mentioned provision of the 1935 Constitution provides, to wit:

Section 5. Save in cases of hereditary succession, no private agricultural land shall be transferred or assigned except to individuals, corporations, or associations qualified to acquire or hold lands of the public domain in the Philippines.

- On the other hand, equally relevant is the procedural issue of whether or not Krivenko's Motion to Withdraw Appeal should be granted.

It is the position of the Court that the granting the motion would result to Krivenko winning the case not by a decision on the merits but because of the circular of the Department of Justice.

== Ruling ==
The Supreme Court deemed it wise to tackle the more important constitutional issue rather than merely give way to the procedural aspect of Krivenko's appeal. The Court convened for days as to what course of action to take, and in the end voted in denying the motion withdrawing the appeal.

Borrowing the words of the penned Supreme Court decision:

"We are thus confronted, at this stage of the proceedings, with our duty, the constitutional question becomes unavoidable…"

"…the possibility for this court to voice its conviction in a future case may be remote, with the result that our indifference of today might signify a permanent offense to the Constitution."

The 1935 Commonwealth Constitution served as the main point of reference in this case; the following facts however, should be noted:

1. The 1943 Constitution was already in place at the time this case was penned in 1947
2. Krivenko bought the property in December 1941
3. The dispute about the registration and the denial of such by the register of deeds occurred in May 1945.
4. Section 1, Article XIII of the 1935 Constitution was reproduced verbatim in Section 1, Article VIII of the 1943 Constitution

=== Dissecting Section 1 of Article XIII (1935 Constitution) ===
The discussion delved into the definition of the term, "public agricultural lands." The court made reference to Section 1, Article XIIIof the 1935 Constitution as the springboard for its discussion.

"SECTION 1. All agricultural, timber, and mineral lands of the public domain, waters, minerals, coal, petroleum, and other mineral oils, all sources of potential energy, and other natural resources of the Philippines belong to the State, and their disposition, exploitation, development, or utilization shall be limited to citizens of the Philippines, or to corporations or associations at least sixty per centum of the capital of which is owned by such citizens…"

The provision refers to the lands of the public domain as falling under three distinct categories: Agricultural, Timber and Mineral lands.

It should be clear that lands of the public domain are by the State first and foremost, but its utilization is limited to Filipino citizens only, or to corporations whose 60% capital stock are owned by Filipinos. It is clear from these phrases that the bent towards excluding foreigners is already evident.

"…Natural resources, with the exception of public agricultural land, shall not be alienated, and no license, concession, or lease for the exploitation, development, or utilization of any of the natural resources shall be granted for a period exceeding twenty-five years, renewable for another twenty-five years…"

Applying statutory construction, it would be appropriate to apply the Doctrine of Necessary Implication. This doctrine is explained in the book of Agpalo:

"The doctrine states that what is implied in a statute is as much a part thereof as that which is expressed. Every statute is understood, by implication, to contain all such provisions as may be necessary to effectuate its object and purpose..."

It thus is clear that public agricultural land is not within the contemplation of inalienable natural resources. Public agricultural land is thus alienable.

The term 'alienable', taking root from 'alienation', is described under Act 2874 of 1919 to mean "…any of the methods authorized by this Act for the acquisition, lease, use or benefit of the lands of the public domain other than timber or mineral lands."

Act 2874 is likewise a relevant piece of legislation in this discussion, because it compiled the laws relative to the lands of the public domain. Under this act, Agricultural Land is also synonymous to: Alienable or disposable.

=== Definition of Public Agricultural Lands ===
What then are the categories of land falling under "Public Agricultural Land" – those lands which are exclusively alienable and disposable?

The Supreme Court made reference to various laws and cases, such as the 1908 case of Mapa vs. Insular Government (10 Phil., 175, 182), the Public Land Act (No. 926), Commonwealth Act 141, among others.

The general tenor of those references is that agricultural land does not really refer to a literal use for agricultural purposes, but as to its "susceptibility to cultivation for agricultural purposes." A technical term whose usage was known and understood by lawmakers and by the Constitutional Commission during that period, it basically referred to lands not falling under timber or mineral, and thus includes residential lands.

Equally telling was the opinion of Secretary of Justice Jose Abad Santos to a 1939 query as to the interpretation of the term in question. The Supreme Court gave great weight to the later Chief Justice's opinion, to wit:

...At the time of the adoption of the Constitution of the Philippines, the term 'agricultural public lands' and, therefore, acquired a technical meaning in our public laws. The Supreme Court of the Philippines in the leading case of Mapa vs. Insular Government, 10 Phil., 175, held that the phrase 'agricultural public lands' means those public lands acquired from Spain which are neither timber nor mineral lands. This definition has been followed by our Supreme Court in many subsequent case. . . .

Residential commercial, or industrial lots forming part of the public domain must have to be included in one or more of these classes. Clearly, they are neither timber nor mineral, of necessity, therefore, they must be classified as agricultural.

Viewed from another angle, it has been held that in determining whether lands are agricultural or not, the character of the land is the test (Odell vs. Durant, 62 N.W., 524; Lorch vs. Missoula Brick and Tile Co., 123 p.25). In other words, it is the susceptibility of the land to cultivation for agricultural purposes by ordinary farming methods which determines whether it is agricultural or not (State vs. Stewart, 190 p. 129).

Furthermore, as said by the Director of Lands, no reason is seen why a piece of land, which may be sold to a person if he is to devote it to agricultural, cannot be sold to him if he intends to use it as a site for his home.

=== Rounding out the Prohibition against Foreign Ownership ===
Seeing as how Article XIII section 1 limits the alienation of public agricultural lands to Filipino citizens, this may easily be circumvented by a simple transfer from a Filipino citizen in favor of an alien. Thus, Section 5 of the same constitution addresses this explicitly.

Section 5. Save in cases of hereditary succession, no private agricultural land shall be transferred or assigned except to individuals, corporations, or associations qualified to acquire or hold lands of the public domain in the Philippines.

When Sections 1 and 5 are read together, it is therefore clear that aliens are prohibited from acquiring lands in the Philippines, subject to exceptions provided by law.

The penned decision referred to the Constitutional Convention, specifically the report of the Committee on Nationalization and Preservation of Lands and other Natural Resources, for the purpose behind the principle:

"that lands, minerals, forests, and other natural resources constitute the exclusive heritage of the Filipino nation. They should, therefore, be preserved for those under the sovereign authority of that nation and for their posterity." (2 Aruego, Framing of the Filipino Constitution, p. 595.)

This is further supported by the CA 141, which blocked out the right of aliens from acquiring property by reciprocity; previously granted them by the Public Land Act No. 2874 sections 120 and 121.

The Supreme Court affirmed the act of the Register of Deeds in denying the registration of Krivenko's land, and established itself as a landmark case when addressing the issue of foreign ownership of lands within the jurisdiction of the Philippines.

== Jurisprudence ==
The case of Nicolas and Sinforoso Mercado against Benito Go Bio began as a suit "brought in the Court of First Instance of Manila (civil case No. 55449), to annul a contract of sale and another of lease on two parcels of land with improvements thereon, on the ground that the deed of sale purporting to convey to the defendant the parcels of land and improvements is not a sale with the right to repurchase but a mortgage to secure the payment of a loan." A settlement was agreed upon on that case on June 24, 1940.

An execution of judgment was filed by Bio and Mercado based on their right to repurchase the property offering to pay for his liabilities which Bio rejected, claiming that the right to repurchase had already expired. Plaintiffs in this case raised the constitutional question because Bio is a Chinese citizen. The court reiterated the ruling as established in Krivenko, stating:

The rule laid down in the Krivenko case, supra, construing the provisions of section 5, article XIII, of the Constitution, until over-ruled or reversed by this Court, is binding upon it. Under that rule, the defendant being an alien or a Chinese citizen cannot acquire urban lands in this country from and after the date of the taking effect of the Constitution which was approved on 8 February 1935. The sale of the lots involved in this litigation was made on 21 February 1938 when the Constitution was in full force and effect. Consequently, the sale to the defendant of the parcels of land and improvements erected thereon comes under the constitutional prohibition. Such being the case, the sale is null and void.

The case of Halili v CA once again highlighted the importance of this case, thus stating: "the landmark case of Krivenko vs. Register of Deeds settled the issue as to who are qualified (and disqualified) to own public as well as private lands in the Philippines."

However, the issue at hand involved the subsequent sale from an alien to a qualified Filipino citizen. Jurisprudence is consistent that "if land is invalidly transferred to an alien who subsequently becomes a citizen or transfers it to a citizen, the flaw in the original transaction is considered cured and the title of the transferee is rendered valid." The court thus held that the selling and acquisition of a Filipino citizen of land improperly transferred to a foreign national is thereby cured because the purpose of the lawmakers, as gleaned from the Krivenko ruling, of keeping the land to Filipinos is thereby upheld. It can be seen here that not only the ruling made in Krivenko is considered by subsequent jurisprudence but discussions made therein as well.

The Krivenko doctrine has a far reaching application and unless subsequently overruled, remains to be a controlling doctrine in Philippine jurisprudence.

== Public Impact ==
A little over two months after the promulgation of the decision by the Court on the Krivenko case, the implication of the ruling is made apparent by a subsequent case. The court narrated in Cabauatan et al. v Hoo that:

On March 18, 1943, plaintiffs sold to Uy Hoo, married to By Siat, and Siy Hong, a widow, all Chinese citizens tivo parcels of residential land situated in the City of Manila, Philippines, which were formerly described in Transfer Certificate of Title No. 63967, in consideration of the sum of P13,000 in Japanese war notes. In view of said transfer, the Register of Deeds of the City of Manila cancelled Transfer Certificate of Title No. 63967 and issued in lieu thereof Transfer Certificate of Title No. 69938 in the name of the purchasers. On November 15, 1947, the case of Krivenko v. Register of Deeds, G. R. No. L-630 was decided by this Court holding that a conveyance of a residential land to aliens infringes Section 5, Article XIII of the Constitution. As a result, on December 15, 1947, plaintiffs demanded from the defendants to restore to them the lands above-referred to on the ground that the sale they made thereof to the defendants was null and void, but the latter refused to do so. Hence the plaintiffs brought this action on January 14, 1948, seeking the annulment of the sale above-mentioned.

The court in that case said that the Krivenko doctrine does not apply because at the time the contract of sale was executed on 1943, the Philippines was under Japanese occupation thus the Constitution of the Philippines, political in nature, being the basis of the Krivenko ruling, was not in force at that time. Hence, the Krivenko doctrine was not yet used by the court although the court still denied the application of the plaintiffs for declaration of nullity of the contract of sale because of their "guilty knowledge" in contracting an illegal sale.

This ruling in Cabauatan v Hoo was further reaffirmed by courts in subsequent proceedings seeking to annul a contract of sale made during the Japanese occupation and depending on the Krivenko doctrine.

Examples cited in Arambulo v So, G.R. No. L-7196, August 31, 1954: Ricamara vs. Ngo Ki, 92 Phil., 1084; Rellosa vs. Gaw Chee Hun, 49 Off. Gaz., (10) 4321, 93 Phil., 827; Caoile vs. Yu Chiao, 49 Off. Gaz., (10) 4345, 93 Phil., 861; Cortes vs. O. Po Poe L-2943, October 30, 1953; Talento and Talento vs. Makiki, et al., 93 Phil., 855.

=== Exceptions ===
Eugene Moss appealed from the decision of the Court of First Instance of Leyte denying his application for the registration of a ten-hectare island on the ground that, being an American citizen or an alien, he is disqualified to acquire lands under section 5, Article XIII of the 1935 Constitution following the decision in Krivenko v Register of Deeds. The case involved Calumpihan Island acquired by Moss on January 20, 1945, from Rufino Pascual. On March 27, 1962, Moss was proclaimed its sole owner. On April 3, 1965, Moss, through Dr. Teodorico H. Jaceldo, his administrator and attorney-in-fact, filed an application for the registration of the said land. Moss is a retired army colonel, an American citizen, and a resident of Texas, USA.

The court reversed the denial of registration made by the trial court clarifying the prohibition made on Krivenko. The court held that "while aliens are disqualified to Acquire lands under the 1935 Constitution, citizens of the United States can acquire lands like Filipino citizens."

Thus, while Krivenko laid down the ruling to prohibit all aliens or those of foreign nationals from acquiring agricultural land in the Philippines, an exception was made in the form of the Ordinance appended to the 1935 Constitution by Resolution No. 39 of the National Assembly dated September 15, 1939, hereinafter provided for:

ORDINANCE APPENDED TO THE CONSTITUTION

SECTION 1. Notwithstanding the provisions of the foregoing Constitution, pending the final and complete withdrawal of the sovereignty of the United States over the Philippines —

xxx xxx xxx

(17) Citizens and corporations of the United States shall enjoy in the Commonwealth of the Philippines all the civil rights of the citizens and corporations, respectively, thereof.

Clearly, while Krivenko laid down the foundation for prohibition on aliens acquiring land in the Philippines, it is not an absolute ruling and admits of exceptions.
