= Roberto A. Abad =

Lawyer, judge

The Honorable Roberto A. Abad
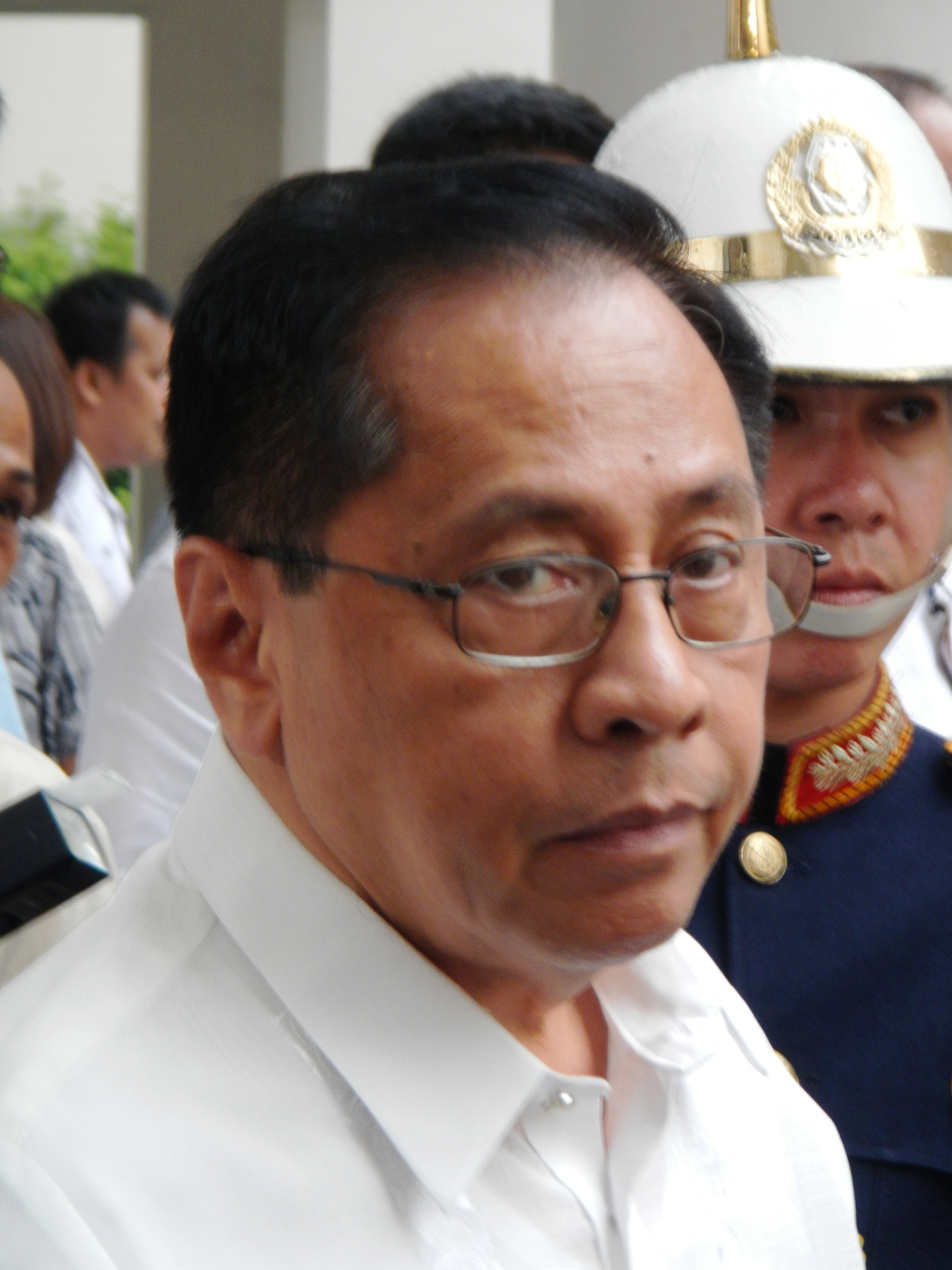
- Roberto A. Abad

165th Associate Justice of the Supreme Court of the Philippines
- In office August 7, 2009 – May 22, 2014
- Appointed by: Gloria Macapagal Arroyo
- Preceded by: Dante Tinga
- Succeeded by: Francis H. Jardeleza

Dean of the University of Santo Tomas Faculty of Civil Law
- In office 2008 – August 7, 2009
- Preceded by: Alfredo Benipayo
- Succeeded by: Nilo Divina

Personal details
- Born: May 22, 1944 (age 82)
- Spouse: Victoria Martinez
- Education: Manuel L. Quezon University (MLQU); Ateneo de Manila University; Ateneo Law School
- Affiliation: Fraternal Order of Utopia

Roberto A. Abad (born May 22, 1944) is a lawyer and judge who served as an associate justice of the Supreme Court of the Philippines from August 7, 2009, to May 22, 2014.

== Law career ==
Abad was on the Dean's honor list at the Ateneo de Manila University, where he earned his law degree in 1968. He is a member of the Fraternal Order of Utopia. He first engaged in private practice at the Jose W. Diokno Law Office in 1968, and then he joined the government, working as Technical Assistant (1969–1973) and Associate Attorney (1974–1975) at the Supreme Court, supervised by then Chief Justice Fred Ruiz Castro.

In 1975, he joined the Office of the Solicitor General (OSG). In 1985, he was promoted to Assistant Solicitor General, a post he held for about a year before setting up his own law firm.

He has rendered free legal aid for the Free Legal Assistance Group (FLAG), Department of Social Welfare and Development, and the Angels of Hope Orphanage, Pulong Bunga, Silang, Cavite. He has conducted weekend training for lay and religious catechists for the Archdiocese of Manila.

From 1988 to 1990, he worked as legal consultant for the presidential committee on the nuclear power plant under the late Justice Secretary Sedfrey Ordoñez. Later, he worked as counsel for the Equitable Banking Corporation and its officers and branch managers during the impeachment trial of former President Joseph E. Estrada.

Prior to his retirement, he penned the High Court's ruling in Disini v. Secretary of Justice on the contentious Cybercrime Prevention Act of 2012, a landmark decision.

== Teaching career ==
The late Chief Justice Roberto C. Concepcion, then University of Santo Tomas (UST) faculty of civil law dean, recruited Abad from the OSG in 1978 to teach political law at the UST. Abad also taught constitutional law, administrative law, election law, law on public corporations, and public international law. He became a bar reviewer in political law.

He also served as Dean at the University of Santo Tomas Faculty of Civil Law.

== Writing career ==
He authored two books: Practical Book in Legal Writing (2002) and Fundamentals of Legal Writing (2004). He was a contributing staff editor in the Supreme Court Reports Annotated (SCRA) from 1972 to 1996.

He conducted a seminar and workshop in legal writing and research in 2007 for the attorneys and investigators of the Office of the Ombudsman upon the invitation of the Philippine Judicial Academy, the United States Agency for International Development, the Rule of Law Effectiveness, and CD Technologies Asia, Inc. He lectured to the research attorneys of the Sandiganbayan and the Court of Tax Appeals regarding the preparation of judicial memoranda.

== Personal life ==
He was widowed by his first wife Liliabeth Abad, with whom he has four children. He is now married to Victoria Martinez, a lawyer.

== Notable opinions ==
- Disini v. The Secretary of Justice (18 February 2014)] — upholding most provisions of the Cybercrime Prevention Act of 2012 as constitutional

Legal offices
Preceded by Dante Tinga	Associate Justice of the Supreme Court of the Philippines; 2009–2014	Succeeded by Francis H. Jardeleza
