= Zarate v. Aquino III =

2015 court case

Zarate v. Aquino
- Court: Supreme Court of the Philippines
- Full case name: Carlos Isagani T. Zarate v. Benigno Simeon C. Aquino III
- Decided: November 15, 2015

Zarate v. Aquino was a court case revolving around red-tagging, an act discrediting the validity of a political opponent by accusing the opponent as communist, leading to murders and attacks.

== Background ==
In March 2014, the government strengthened military power in Davao City, causing 1,300 Manobos to evacuate Davao City, In January 2015, however, some of the Manobos went back to Davao City, (specifically UCCP Haran), some of the Manobos stated that "they were forced to join rallies and prayers against their own will", stating that "their fears intensified when they saw a lifeless body hanging in a tree, belonging to the Manobos". On May 12, 2015, 7 Manobos filed a complaint against the defendants.

== Decision ==
The Manobos claimed that the defendants had "ties with the New People's Army", stating that their appearance in the lists are "threats to their life" warranting the safety of the Writ of amparo. After the court researched the defendants and the petitioners, the court dismissed the petition, stating that "The writ of amparo is a "remedy available to any person whose right to life, liberty and security is violated or threatened with violation by an unlawful act or omission of a public official or employee, or of a private individual or entity." The petitioners' statements were that "143 members of the political party Bayan Muna were victims of killings during the Arroyo administration, and that 12 members and leaders of Bayan Muna have been killed under the Aquino administration.
