= Francis Jardeleza =

Filipino lawyer (born 1949)

The Honorable Francis H. Jardeleza
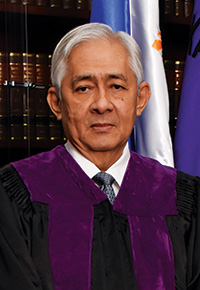

173rd Associate Justice of the Supreme Court of the Philippines
- In office August 19, 2014 – September 26, 2019
- President: Benigno Aquino III
- Preceded by: Roberto Abad
- Succeeded by: Mario V. Lopez

Solicitor General of the Philippines
- In office February 6, 2012 – August 19, 2014
- President: Benigno Aquino III
- Preceded by: Jose Anselmo Cadiz
- Succeeded by: Florin Hilbay

Personal details
- Born: September 26, 1949 (age 77) Jaro, Iloilo, Philippines
- Spouse: Concepcion L. Jardeleza
- Education: University of the Philippines Visayas (BA); University of the Philippines Diliman (LL.B); Harvard University (LL.M)
- Occupation: Lawyer

Francis H. Jardeleza (born September 26, 1949) is a former Associate Justice of the Supreme Court of the Philippines. He served as Solicitor General of the Philippines from 2012 to 2014, and was appointed by President Benigno Aquino III to the High Court on August 19, 2014.

== Background ==
Jardeleza grew up in Jaro, Iloilo City, where he finished his elementary and secondary education. He earned his Bachelor of Arts degree in Political Science from the University of the Philippines Visayas in 1970. He earned his law degree at the University of the Philippines College of Law at UP Diliman, where he graduated as salutatorian in 1974. As a student at UP Law, Jardeleza was Vice-Chairperson of the Philippine Law Journal. He was admitted to the bar in 1974, having placed third in the bar examinations held that year. In 1977, Jardeleza obtained a Masters of Law degree from Harvard Law School.

== Professional career ==
Jardeleza was in private practice until 1996, including a long-term stint at the ACCRA Law Offices. In 1996, he was named Senior Vice-President and General Legal Counsel of San Miguel Corporation. He remained with San Miguel Corporation until 2010.

== Government service ==
In July 2010, Jardeleza was appointed Deputy Ombudsman for Luzon by President Benigno Aquino III. On February 6, 2012, Jardeleza's appointment as Solicitor General of the Philippines was announced, following the resignation of Jose Anselmo Cadiz. He took his oath of office as Solicitor General on February 20, 2012.

On 19 August 2014, President Aquino appointed Jardeleza as an Associate Justice of the Supreme Court of the Philippines, succeeding retired Justice Roberto Abad.

On 26 September 2019, Jardeleza retired upon reaching his 70th birthday.

== In academia ==
Jardeleza has been a professorial lecturer at the University of the Philippines College of Law since 1993, teaching constitutional law among other subjects. His wife, Concepcion Lim-Jardeleza is also a professor in the same law school.

Legal offices
Preceded by Roberto Abad	Associate Justice of the Supreme Court of the Philippines; 2014–2019	Succeeded by Mario V. Lopez
