= Raul Villanueva =

Filipino Associate Justice of the Supreme Court

The Honourable Raul Villanueva
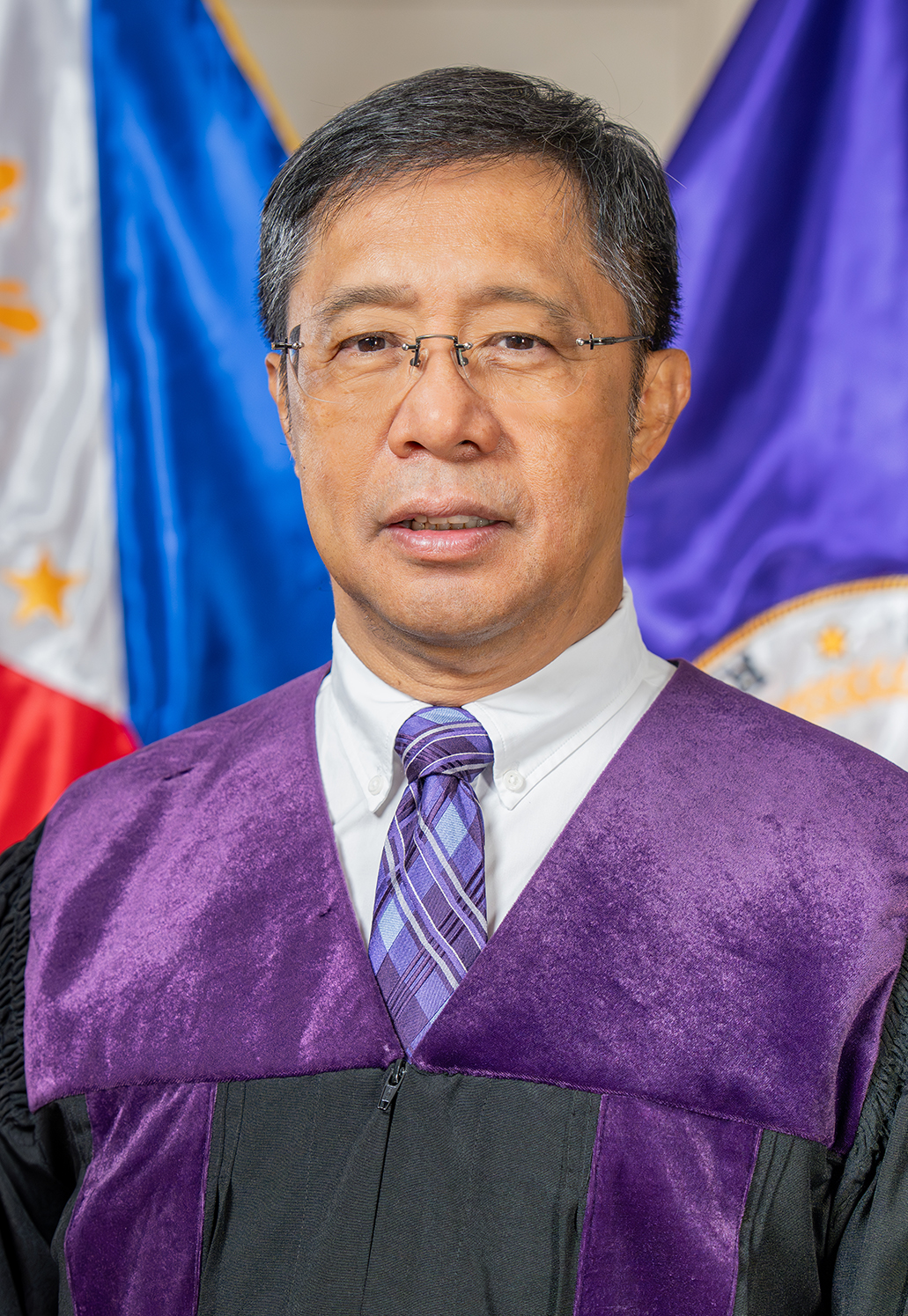
- Official portrait, 2025

195th Associate Justice of the Supreme Court of the Philippines
- Incumbent
- Assumed office June 15, 2025
- Appointed by: Bongbong Marcos
- Preceded by: Mario Lopez

15th Court Administrator of the Supreme Court of the Philippines
- In office March 1, 2022 – June 15, 2025
- Preceded by: Midas Marquez
- Succeeded by: Maria Theresa Dolores Gomez-Estoesta

Personal details
- Born: April 15, 1963 (age 63) Narvacan, Ilocos Sur, Philippines
- Spouse: Ma. Arsenia F. Villanueva
- Children: Ryan Aldrin; Arielle Rozanne; Ariadne Rauz

Raul Bautista Villanueva (born April 15, 1963) is a Filipino lawyer who has served as an associate justice of the Supreme Court of the Philippines since June 15, 2025. He is the first appointee to the high court by President Bongbong Marcos.

== Early life and education ==
Raul Villanueva was born in Narvacan, Ilocos Sur, and graduated at the top of his class in Narvacan South Central School in 1976, and with honors in high school from Lourdes School Quezon City in 1981. He received his Bachelor of Arts degree in Economics from the University of the Philippines, Diliman in 1985. There, he became a member of the Alpha Phi Beta Fraternity. He would eventually finish his Bachelor of Laws (now Juris Doctor) degree from the University of the Philippines College of Law in 1990.

== Judicial career ==
Villanueva was appointed presiding judge of Branch 255 of the Regional Trial Court (RTC) in Las Piñas City on December 5, 2002. During his tenure, he also took on the roles of acting presiding judge for Branch 267 of the RTC in Taguig City and Branch 4 of the RTC in Manila. In March 2009, he was appointed as the executive judge of the RTC in Las Piñas. He has served as the executive vice president of the Philippine Judges Association and was the founding president of the Las Piñas City Judges Association. On March 1, 2022, Villanueva was appointed court administrator of the Supreme Court.
