= Alicia Austria-Martinez =

Filipino judge (born 1940)

The Honorable Ma. Alicia Austria-Martinez

149th Associate Justice of the Supreme Court of the Philippines
- In office April 9, 2002 – April 30, 2009
- Appointed by: Gloria Macapagal Arroyo
- Preceded by: Bernardo P. Pardo
- Succeeded by: Mariano del Castillo

Personal details
- Born: December 19, 1940 (age 85) Manila, Commonwealth of the Philippines
- Spouse: Daniel T. Martinez (deceased)

Maria Alicia Austria-Martinez (born Maria Alicia Austria; December 19, 1940) is a Filipino jurist who served as an associate justice of the Supreme Court of the Philippines from 2002 to 2009. She was appointed to the Court by President Gloria Macapagal Arroyo on April 12, 2002.

== Profile ==
Austria-Martinez started working in the government as a clerk in the Office of the Insurance Commissioner (February 1962 - December 1962). Later, she became Legal Officer I in the same Office (January 1963 - October 1964).

Her brief stint in the Office of the Insurance Commissioner was cut short when she became a legal researcher in the Court of First Instance of Rizal (October 1964 - July 1969), thus, starting her long and illustrious career in the judiciary. From being a researcher, she gradually worked her way up in the ladder of judicial hierarchy and, in the process, held various positions such as Attorney Researcher (July 1969 - December 1975), Senior Attorney (January 1976 - October 20, 1976), and eventually Division Clerk of Court of the Court of Appeals (October 21, 1976 - January 17, 1983).

On January 18, 1983, she was appointed as the Presiding Judge of the Regional Trial Court (Branch XXXVI) of Calamba, Laguna. On November 4, 1986, she became the Presiding Judge of the Regional Trial Court (Branch CLIX) of Pasig. From 1990 to 1992, she concurrently held the position of Executive Judge of the Regional Trial Court of Pasig. She also served in different capacities as an officer of the Philippines Judges’ Association and the Philippine Women Judges’ Association from 1987 to 1992.

On March 3, 1992, she went back to the Court of Appeals, this time as an associate justice. She served in this capacity until July 27, 2001, when she was appointed as the presiding justice of the Court of Appeals. However, her occupation of the Office of the presiding justice proved to be short-lived because on April 9, 2002, she was named associate justice of the High Tribunal.

Her curriculum vitae includes: Examiner in Commercial Law in the 1994 Bar Examinations and Examiner in Remedial Law in the 2000 Bar Examinations; member of the Supreme Court's Committee on Formulation of Rules of Procedure in Family Courts which includes the drafting of the Rules on Examination of a Child Witness, on Domestic Adoption, on Commitment of Children, and on Annulment and Declaration of Nullity of Marriage; lecturer and resource person in various programs and seminars conducted under the auspices of the Supreme Court, the Philippine Judicial Academy and the U.P. Law Center.

Austria-Martinez graduated from the University of the Philippines College of Law in 1962, earning the degree of Bachelor Laws (LLB). She passed the Bar Examinations given in 1962. She also obtained a master's degree in National Security Administration in 1980 from the National Defense College of the Philippines where she eventually became the Chairman of the Panel of Examiners for Oral Defense in 1987, 1988 and 1991. She also served as a member of the Board of Admission in the same College from 1991–1993. Austria-Martinez also attended the 31st Program of Instruction for Lawyers held at the Harvard Law School in Cambridge, Massachusetts in 1999.

=== Resignation ===
In September 2008, Austria-Martinez, citing health reasons, filed a letter to the Supreme Court of the Philippines through Reynato Puno, tendering her resignation effective April 30, 2009, or 15 months before her compulsory retirement on December 19, 2010. In the October 1 Judicial and Bar Council's en banc deliberations, Reynato Puno ruled: “The court merely noted it. We don’t have to approve it... it is her right.” During the JBC hearing, a JBC member said "Austria-Martinez had wanted to retire earlier because of health reasons. We were told she had health problems even when she was in the CA.” Retired Chief Justice of the Supreme Court of the Philippines Artemio Panganiban stated: "I am saddened that Justice Ma. Alicia Austria-Martinez has opted to retire early from the Supreme Court due to 'health reasons.' She is not bedridden. Neither is she physically or mentally incapacitated, but she has chosen to retire on April 30, 2009 because she felt she could no longer cope with the heavy caseload." The 1987 Constitution of the Philippines provides that: "Section 11, Article VIII. The Members of the Supreme Court xxx shall hold office during good behavior until they reach the age of seventy years or become incapacitated to discharge the duties of their office."

== Family ==
Born as Ma. Alicia Austria in Manila on December 19, 1940, Austria-Martinez was introduced early to the intricacies of the law. Both her parents were lawyers. Her father, Retired Colonel Benjamin A. Austria, served in the Philippine Air Force while her mother, Remedios M. Austria, was a Doctor of Civil Law and served as a consultant in the Graduate School of the University of Santo Tomas (UST). Austria-Martinez is the widow of Daniel T. Martinez who once served as the Clerk of Court of the Supreme Court. Austria-Martinez has two sons.

== Other work ==
Austria-Martinez also served as dean of Adamson University College of Law from 2012 to 2015.

== Some notable opinions ==
- Macalintal v. COMELEC (2003) — on constitutionality of the Overseas Absentee Voting Act
- Tecson v. COMELEC (2004) - Separate Opinion — on the nationality of presidential candidate Fernando Poe Jr.
- Honasan v. Panel of Investigators (2004) — on authority of the Department of Justice to conduct preliminary investigations on a Senator charged with the crime of coup d'état.
- Freedom from Debt Coalition v. MERALCO (2004) - Concurring and Dissenting — on the requisite of notice prior to approval of electricity rate increases.
- ETPI v. ICC (2004) — on the power grant of provisional authorities by the government to operate telecommunications services.
- People v. Tomaquin (2004) — on admissibility in evidence of extrajudicial confession executed with assistance of a barangay captain/lawyer.
- Olivares v. Marquez (2004) — on procedure for challenging municipal tax assessments.
- Tolentino v. Mendoza (2004) — on admissibility in evidence of confidential birth records
- ABAKADA v. Ermita (2005) — on constitutionality of 2005 Expanded Value Added Tax Law

Legal offices
Preceded by Bernardo P. Pardo	Associate Justice of the Supreme Court; 2002–2009	Succeeded by Mariano del Castillo
