= Philippine Internet Commerce Society =

The Philippine Internet Commerce Society (PICS) is an advocacy group which promotes electronic commerce in the Philippines. It was founded in September 1997 by Janette Toral.

It successfully lobbied for the passage of the Y2K Law, which made industries prepare for the year 2000 and guard themselves from "Y2K Bug" which was expected to compromise computer databases. It also advocated for the Electronic Commerce Law or Republic Act 8792 which promoted the universal use of electronic transactions in the government and by the general public.
