= Quinto v. COMELEC =

- Court: Supreme Court of the Philippines en banc

Full case name
- Eleazar P. Quinto and Gerino A. Tolentino Jr. v. Commission on Elections
- Decided: December 1, 2009
- Citation: 621 Phil. 236 (G.R. No. 189698)

Case opinions
- Ponente: Antonio Nachura (original case), Reynato Puno (at time of motion for reconsideration)
- (On motion for reconsideration) Majority: 10; Puno, Carpio, Carpio Morales, Brion, Peralta, Del Castillo, Abad, Villarama, Jr., Perez, Mendoza; Dissent: 5 Corona, Velasco Jr., Nachura, Leonardo-De Castro, Bersamin

Court membership
- Chief Justice: Reynato Puno

Reconsideration
- M.R. accepted: February 22, 2010
- 2nd and final M.R. denied: March 2, 2010

Quinto v. COMELEC, 621 Phil. 236 (2009), is a controversial decision of the Supreme Court of the Philippines which paved the way, albeit temporarily, for incumbent appointive executive officials to stay in office after filing their certificates of candidacy for election to an elective office. The decision was first decided by a slim majority of 8-6, but was eventually reversed 10-5 upon a motion for reconsideration after the retirement of one justice and the appointment of two new ones.

== The assailed Comelec Resolution ==
In preparation for the upcoming 2010 National Elections, the Commission on Elections issued Resolution No. 8678 to govern the filing of Certificates of Candidacy for national and local positions. Section 4 of the Resolution reads:

Sec. 4. Effects of Filing of Certificates of Candidacy. (a) Any person holding a public appointive office or position, including active members of the Armed Forces of the Philippines, and other officers and employees in government-owned or controlled corporations, shall be considered ipso facto resigned from his office upon the filing of his certificate of candidacy. (b) Any person holding an elective office or position shall not be considered resigned upon the filing of his certificate of candidacy for the same or any other elective office or position.

Since they intend to run for elective office in the 2010 Elections, Department of Environment and Natural Resources Undersecretary Eleazar Quinto (running for Pangasinan congressman) and DENR Land Management Bureau Director Gerino Tolentino Jr. (running for Manila councilor) filed a petition for certiorari and prohibition to nullify sec. 4(a) of Resolution 8678. According to them, imposing automatic resignation against appointive officials who file their certificates of candidacy is offensive to the Equal Protection Clause of the Constitution of the Philippines because it gives an undue advantage to elective officials who are allowed to remain in office despite the filing of their certificates of candidacy.

Representing the Commission, the Solicitor General raised several arguments against the petition. Firstly, certiorari and prohibition under Rule 65 of the Rules of Court are not the proper remedies against the assailed Comelec Resolution. Secondly, petitioners have no legal standing to question the Resolution because they are not yet candidates. Lastly, no error was committed by the Comelec in issuing sec. 4(a) of Resolution 8678 because it was merely copied verbatim from sec. 13 of Republic Act No. 9363 and sec. 66 of the Omnibus Election Code. However, the Solicitor General was of the opinion that the resign-to-run rule results to certain absurdities, and that it no longer has a place in our present election laws.

The petitioners thus raised the questions on: (1) Whether the resort to certiorari and prohibition was the proper remedy; (2) Whether the petitioners have legal standing to assail Resolution 8678; and, (3) Whether applying the resign-to-run rule to appointive officials and not to elective ones violates the equal protection clause of the Constitution.

== Ruling on the procedural question ==
The resort to certiorari and prohibition was inappropriate. While certiorari under Rule 65 (in relation to Rule 64) applies only to acts of the Comelec in exercise of its quasi-judicial powers, Resolution 8678 was issued in the exercise of the Commission’s quasi-legislative functions. Thus, certiorari was not the proper remedy to question the said Resolution. Likewise, prohibition under Rule 65 must fail because what the petitioners actually sought was the proper construction of the Resolution and the declaration of their rights thereunder. The Court ruled that the petition was actually one for declaratory relief, which was not within jurisdiction of the Supreme Court. However, since the constitutionality of the Resolution and the law from which it was based were being questioned, the Court nevertheless decided to take cognizance of the case.

On the issue on the petitioners’ locus standi, while it is true that the petitioners were not yet candidates at the time the petition was filed, they still have the legal standing to assail the Resolution because they are qualified voters. The Court held that any restriction on candidacy affects the rights of the voters to choose their public officials; therefore, both candidate and voter may question the validity of such restriction.

== Original ruling on the substantial issues ==
=== Right to run for elective office as a fundamental right ===
The original decision struck down as unconstitutional not only sec. 4(a) of Resolution 8678, but also sec. 13 of R.A. 9369 and sec. 66 of the Omnibus Election Code. In nullifying these provisions, Justice Antonio Eduardo Nachura’s ponencia extensively quoted Mancuso v. Taft (476 F.2d 187, March 20, 1973), a 1973 decision of the United States Court of Appeals involving Kenneth Mancuso, a police officer who was nominated to the legislature of the State of Rhode Island. In that case, the U.S. appellate court ruled in favor of Mancuso and nullified the law which required a civil service official to vacate his post upon nomination to another public office. It held that the right to run for public office is a fundamental right protected by the Bill of Rights, and being so, any restriction thereto has to be subjected to strict equal protection review.

To justify the application of the strict equal protection test to sec. 4(a), the original majority ruled that the petitioners’ interest to run for public office was likewise protected by the Philippine Constitution, specifically section 4 on Freedom of Expression and section 8 Right to Association of Article III (Bill of Rights).

=== Overbroad application of the restriction ===
Applying the strict equal protection test to the assailed Resolution, the original decision held that sec. 4(a) of Resolution 8678 (and its sources, sec. 13 of R.A. 9369 and sec. 66 of the Omnibus Election Code) created a sweeping effect on all appointive government officials and employees since the resign-to-run rule applied to all of them without any consideration to the kind of appointive office the candidate may actually hold.

The original majority was convinced that the sweeping restriction of sec. 4(a) would create an absurdity that even a utility worker who intends to run for an elective post would be automatically resigned even if he cannot in any way use his position as utility worker to influence the results of the election. Thus, it was held that this restriction was overbroad since it applied to all appointive officials indiscriminately without regard to the degree of influence that their office may actually have..

=== Violation of the equal protection clause ===
The original ruling also saw no valid justification in applying the automatic resignation rule exclusively to appointive officials and not to elected ones. The classification between the two classes of officials failed to pass the test of equal protection, which requires a valid classification to be: (1) based upon substantial distinctions; (2) germane to the purposes of the law; (3) not limited to existing conditions only; and (4) applicable equally to all members of the class.

The first ponencia held that the classification under section 4 of Resolution 8678 must be struck down because it fails to satisfy the second requisite that the classification must be germane to the purposes of the law. If the purpose of the automatic resignation rule is to prevent either undue influence or neglect of duty on the part of the candidate, there is no reason to exclude elected officials from the coverage of the law. The original majority agreed that these fears are equally applicable to elected and appointive officials alike, thus, treating the one differently from the other should fail the test of equal protection.

The original decision also noted that the substantial distinction between elective and appointive government officials laid down in the case of Fariñas v. Executive Secretary (G.R. No. 147387, December 10, 2003) cannot be used to justify the different treatment of the two classes of officials because that "doctrine" was a mere obiter dictum. In that case, sec. 14 of R.A. 9006 was questioned as an invalid rider in so far as it repealed sec. 67 of the Omnibus Election Code without mention of it in the law’s title. Incidentally, said sec. 67 provided for the automatic resignation of elected officials upon the filing of their certificates of candidacy. By repealing sec. 67, only the automatic resignation of appointive officials under sec. 66 remained in the law. Nevertheless, the Court upheld sec. 14 of R.A. 9006 on the ground, among others, that Congress merely recognized the substantial distinction between elective and appointive officials when it imposed the resign-to-run rule only on the latter. According to Justice Nachura, since the primary issue in that case was whether sec. 14 was an invalid rider, the discussion on substantial distinction was merely incidental and nothing but an obiter dictum.

== Reversed ruling on the substantial issues ==
After the retirement of Justice Minita Chico-Nazario (who agreed with the Nachura decision) and the appointment of Justices Jose Perez and Jose C. Mendoza (who both agreed to Puno's opinion), the Supreme Court resolved to reverse the original decision and adopt the dissenting opinion of Chief Justice Reynato Puno.

In opposition to the Justice Nachura’s original ponencia, Justice Reynato Puno made a very exhaustive discussion on the implications of the original ruling. The new Decision stressed that the doctrine of substantial distinction in Fariñas was not an obiter dictum because the seemingly unfair treatment caused by the repeal of sec. 67 and retention of sec. 66 was squarely raised in that case. Thus, the discussion on substantial distinction between appointive and elected officials was not merely incidental, but was actually necessary for the determination of that case.

The new Decision upheld sec. 4(a) of Resolution 8678, sec. 13 of R.A. 9369 and sec. 66 of the Omnibus Election Code. Nine other justices adopted Justice Puno’s view that these provisions satisfy the requisites of the equal protection test, especially the second requirement that it must be germane to the purposes of the law. It was emphasized that the purpose of the law is to defer to the sovereign will of the people by letting elective officials serve until the end of the terms for which they were elected notwithstanding the filing of their certificates of candidacy. On the contrary, the automatic resignation rule was imposed upon appointive officials because unlike elected politicians, "appointive officials, as officers and employees in the civil service, are strictly prohibited from engaging in any partisan political activity or from taking part in any election, except to vote" (Sec. 55 of the Administrative Code of 1987).

The Chief Justice underscored the fact that Mancuso v. Taft, the U.S. Court of Appeals case that was heavily relied upon by Nachura's ponencia, had already been overturned by prevailing jurisprudence in the United States. The Court cited several decisions of the U.S. Supreme Court stating that the right to express one’s views through candidacy is not a fundamental right and is neither covered by the freedom of expression nor the right to association. More importantly, it was ruled that the resign-to-run rule on appointive officials does not violate a person’s right to run for public office because such right must give way to the substantial public interest being protected by the rule—to maintain a civil service that is impartial and free from the evils of partisan politics.
