= Rodil Zalameda =

Chief Justice of the Supreme Court of the Philippines since 2026

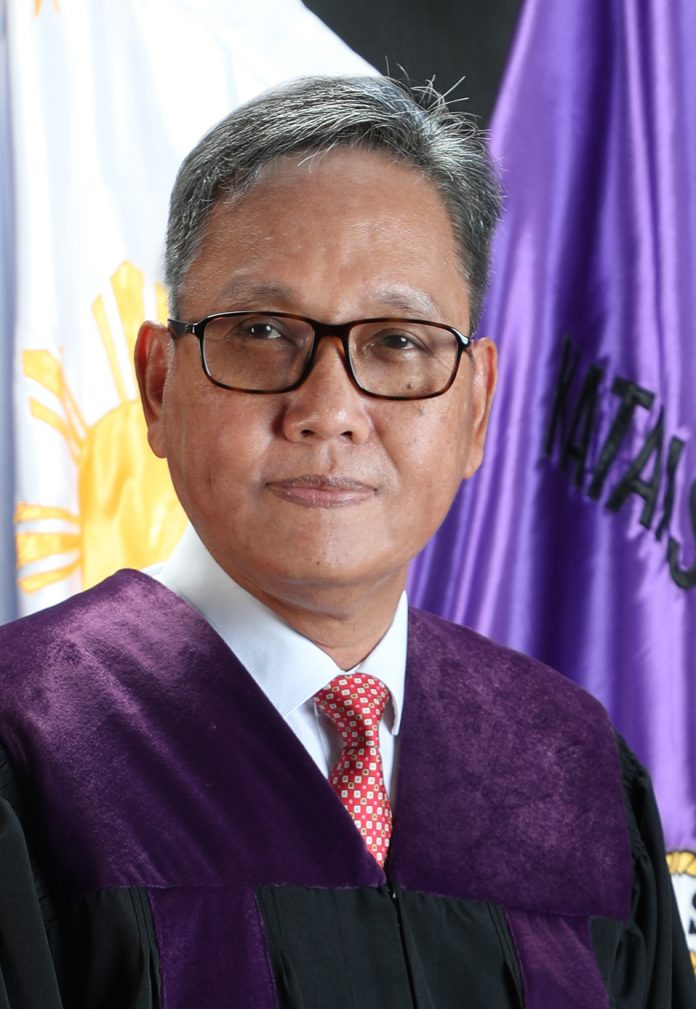
- Official portrait, 2022

28th Chief Justice of the Philippines
- Incumbent
- Assumed office November 6, 2026
- Appointed by: Bongbong Marcos
- Preceded by: Alexander Gesmundo

Associate Justice of the Supreme Court of the Philippines
- In office August 5, 2019 – November 6, 2026
- Appointed by: Rodrigo Duterte
- Preceded by: Mariano del Castillo

Justice of the Court of Appeals of the Philippines
- In office September 5, 2008 – August 5, 2019
- Appointed by: Gloria Macapagal Arroyo
- Preceded by: Vicente Roxas
- Succeeded by: Jacinto Fajardo Jr.

Personal details
- Born: Rodil Vaquilar Zalameda; August 2, 1963 (age 63) Caloocan, Philippines
- Education: University of the East (AB); Ateneo de Manila University (LLB)
- Affiliation: Fraternal Order of Utopia

Rodil Vaquilar Zalameda (born August 2, 1963) is a Filipino jurist who has served as the 28th chief justice of the Philippines since November 6, 2026. He previously served as an associate justice of the Supreme Court from 2019 to 2026, having been appointed by President Rodrigo Duterte to succeed retiring Associate Justice Mariano del Castillo. He also served as associate justice of the Court of Appeals from 2008 to 2019 as well as city prosecutor of Mandaluyong from 2002 to 2008.

== Early life ==
Rodil Vaquilar Zalameda was born on August 2, 1963, in Caloocan. Zalameda took his secondary studies at the University of the East (UE) Caloocan, graduating in 1979. He obtained a bachelor's degree in political science at the UE Manila in 1983.

He took his Bachelor of Laws at the Ateneo Law School in 1987 and passed the bar exam in 1988.

== Career ==
=== Early years ===
After passing the bar, Zalameda worked in the Makati Regional Trial Court as a clerk for two years. He then practiced privately until returning to government service in 1995 as a prosecutor in Mandaluyong. He became the assistant city prosecutor (or "prosecutor II") in 1996 and city prosecutor in 2002. He served in the position until 2008.

=== Court of Appeals ===
On September 5, 2008, Zalameda was appointed to the Court of Appeals. In December 2012, the court's first division upheld in a decision written by Zalameda the dismissal of administrative charges filed against overall deputy ombudsman Orlando Casimiro in relation to the Ombudsman's delay in resolving the December 1994 graft case of "ghost deliveries" to the Philippine Air Force. In November 2014, he penned the court's decision granting Ginebra San Miguel's infringement case against Tanduay Distillers that had been dismissed in 2012 by a Mandaluyong regional trial court. Zalameda wrote that Tanduay's mere use of the word "ginebra" for its "Ginebra Kapitan" products is "trademark infringement by itself".

== Supreme Court of the Philippines ==
=== Associate Justice ===
In August 2019, Zalameda was appointed by President Rodrigo Duterte as Associate Justice of the Supreme Court to replace Mariano del Castillo, who retired on July 29, 2019. He is the first Supreme Court appointee who took a decision writing exam in addition to an interview conducted by the Judicial and Bar Council.

In the landmark consolidated en banc decision of Buenafe vs. Commission on Elections written by Zalameda on June 28, 2022, the Supreme Court dismissed petitions seeking to cancel the certificate of candidacy (COC) of then-presidential candidate Bongbong Marcos or to disqualify him from the 2022 presidential race. The petitioners contended that Marcos Jr. committed a false material representation by asserting his eligibility despite a prior conviction for failure to file income tax returns. Writing for the court in Buenafe v. Commission on Elections, Zalameda held that the failure to file income tax returns does not inherently constitute a crime involving moral turpitude, nor did the underlying Court of Appeals conviction explicitly attach the accessory penalty of perpetual disqualification from public office. The decision confirmed that Marcos Jr. possessed all legal qualifications to run for the presidency and affirmed the prior rulings of the COMELEC.

Authoring a landmark en banc ruling on civil liberties in Deduro vs. Vinoya on July 4, 2023, Zalameda reversed a regional trial court's summary dismissal of a petition for a Writ of Amparo filed by activist Siegfred Deduro. Deduro had sought judicial protection after military officials publicly labeled him a high-ranking member of the Communist Party of the Philippines–New People's Army (CPP-NPA). In Deduro vs. Vinoya, Zalameda explicitly declared that "red-tagging, vilification, labeling, and guilt by association constitute threats to a person's right to life, liberty, or security" sufficient to warrant the protective coverage of the Amparo rule. By recognizing state-sponsored ideological vilification as a justiciable threat, the ruling established critical precedent allowing target individuals to demand judicial intervention and accountability.

In April 2026, Zalameda authored the court's majority opinion in Generillo Jr. vs. Senate of the Philippines, which ruled that the constitutional term "forthwith" for convening an impeachment trial meant "within a reasonable time" based on the Senate's discretion, reasoning that the constitution did not provide a fixed timeframe.

In the decision rendered in People vs. Marcos on June 10, 2026, Zalameda authored the Supreme Court ruling that reversed the November 9, 2018 Sandiganbayan conviction of former First Lady Imelda Marcos on seven counts of graft involving Swiss foundations. The anti-graft court had previously sentenced Marcos to prison terms totaling up to 77 years for creating and maintaining private financial entities in Switzerland while serving as a public official during her late husband, Ferdinand Marcos's regime. Writing for the Court, Zalameda concluded that the prosecution failed to establish her criminal guilt beyond reasonable doubt due to fatal evidentiary gaps and technical defects in the prosecution's proof of ownership and control. The judgment acquitted the 97-year-old Marcos of all criminal liability under the anti-graft law, but the court emphasized that its ruling does not settle the question of whether her assets in the foundations constitute ill-gotten wealth.

In Macalintal vs. Office of the President, Zalameda wrote the court's ruling to dismiss Romulo Macalintal's petition challenging the constitutionality of the recently passed Republic Act No. 12326, which extended the term of barangay officials from four to five years. Macalintal argued that the law, which also moved the barangay and Sangguniang Kabataan elections from November 2026 to November 2028, failed to meet the standard for election postponement set by the court's 2023 case Macalintal vs. Comelec and thus violated the people's right to vote. The court dismissed the petition due to the republic act being "a term-fixing law, not an election postponement law", and thus the guidelines set in Macalintal vs. Comelec does not apply.

=== Chief Justice ===
President Bongbong Marcos announced Zalameda's appointment as Chief Justice of the Supreme Court replacing retiring chief justice Alexander Gesmundo on November 6, 2026.

== Personal life ==
Zalameda is married to Maria Vilma Amor with whom he has a son named Jasper Rodil II, a lawyer by profession.

Legal offices
Preceded by Vicente Roxas	Justice of the Court of Appeals of the Philippines; 2008–2019	Succeeded by Jacinto Fajardo Jr.
Preceded by Mariano del Castillo	Associate Justice of the Supreme Court; 2019–2026	Succeeded by Vacant
Preceded by Alexander Gesmundo	Chief Justice of the Supreme Court; 2026–present	Incumbent
Order of precedence
Preceded by Bojie Dy as Speaker of the House of Representatives	Order of Precedence of the Philippines as Chief Justice of the Supreme Court	Succeeded by Tess Lazaro as Secretary of Foreign Affairs
