= Mariano del Castillo =

Filipino judge (born 1949)

The Honourable Mariano C. del Castillo
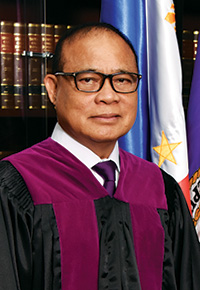

164th Associate Justice of the Philippine Supreme Court
- In office July 29, 2009 – July 29, 2019
- Appointed by: Gloria Macapagal Arroyo
- Preceded by: Alicia Austria-Martinez
- Succeeded by: Rodil Zalameda

Personal details
- Born: Mariano C. del Castillo; 29 July 1949 (age 76)
- Affiliation: Aquila Legis

Mariano C. del Castillo (born July 29, 1949) is a former associate justice of the Supreme Court of the Philippines.

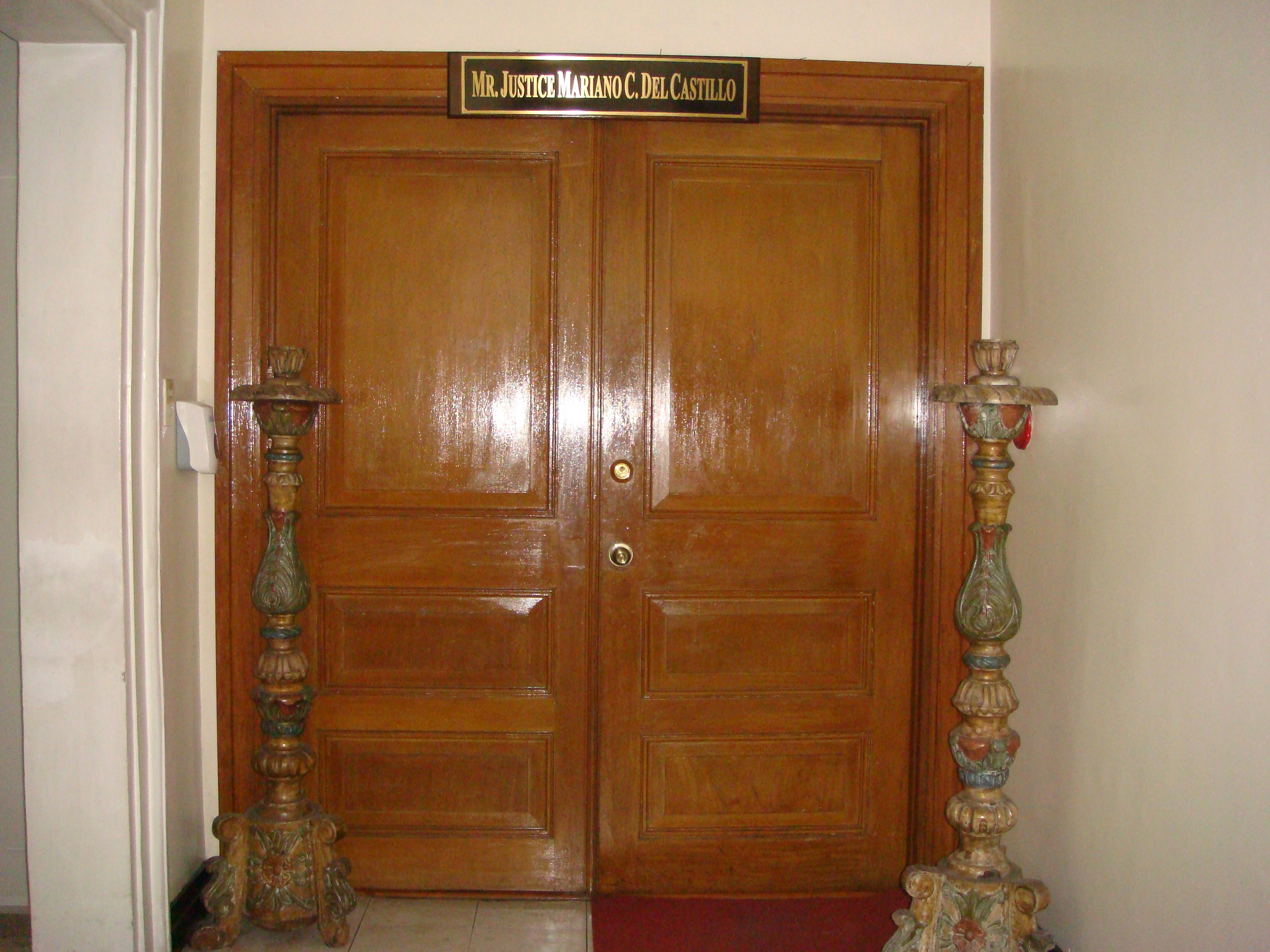
Chambers of Mariano C. del Castillo (new Supreme Court of the Philippines building).

After graduating from San Beda College, Del Castillo pursued law studies at the Ateneo de Manila University. He joined the judiciary in 1989 as a Municipal Trial Court judge of San Mateo, Rizal before he was promoted as a Regional Trial Court judge of Angeles City in 1992, and later as a Regional Trial Court judge of Quezon City in 1995, where he was appointed First Vice-Executive Judge. He was appointed as a CA justice in 2001. He was active in the Philippine Judges Association, where he served as director, vice-president for administration, senior vice-president, and executive vice-president.

Likewise, he has held various positions in religious, civic, community, and non-governmental organizations. He taught Practice Court II at the Ateneo College of Law and lectures at the Mandatory Continuing Legal Education (MCLE) and Philippine Judicial Academy (PHILJA) seminars. He was also a pre-Bar reviewer in Legal Ethics and was the Chair/Editor in Chief of the Court of Appeals Journal.

Justice Del Castillo has had zero backlog in the CA since 2004. In 2005, he was conferred the Best Performing Court of Appeals Justice for 2004 and the Justice George A. Malcolm Award by the Rotary Club of Manila. In 2007, he was conferred the Presiding Justice Award for Outstanding Performance.

He was the chairman of the 2018 Philippine Bar Examination.

== Plagiarism controversy ==
On 28 April 2010, Justice del Castillo penned the decision on Vinuya vs. Executive Secretary, a case involving Filipina sex slavery victims during the Japanese occupation in the Second World War. Petitioners said that it contains "plagiarized portions" taken out of context to support the arguments for denying their petition.

Legal offices
Preceded by Alicia Austria-Martinez	Associate Justice of the Supreme Court; 2009–2019	Succeeded by Rodil Zalameda
