= List of justices of the Supreme Court of the Philippines =

List of justices

This is the list of justices of the Supreme Court of the Philippines from 1901 to present.

== List of justices ==
No.	Portrait	Name (birth–death)	Position	Succeeded	Tenure start	Tenure end	Tenure length	Appointed by
1		Cayetano Arellano (1847–1920)	Chief Justice	Inaugural	June 15, 1901	April 12, 1920	18 years, 302 days	William McKinley
2		Florentino Torres (1844–1926)	Associate Justice	Inaugural	June 15, 1901	April 20, 1920	18 years, 310 days	William McKinley
3		Victorino Mapa (1852–1927)	Associate Justice	Inaugural	June 15, 1901	October 31, 1913 (Note: Victorino Mapa resigned as associate justice on October 31, 1913, upon his appointment as member of the Philippine Commission and Secretary of Justice.)	12 years, 138 days	William McKinley
4		James Francis Smith (1859–1928)	Associate Justice	Inaugural	June 15, 1901	February 17, 1903	1 year, 247 days	William McKinley
5		Joseph F. Cooper (1854–1942)	Associate Justice	Inaugural	June 15, 1901	October 17, 1904	3 years, 124 days	William McKinley
6		Charles Andrew Willard (1857–1914)	Associate Justice	Inaugural	June 15, 1901	April 24, 1904	2 years, 314 days	William McKinley
7		Fletcher Ladd (1862–1903)	Associate Justice	Inaugural	June 15, 1901	July 13, 1903	2 years, 28 days	William McKinley
8		John T. McDonough (1843–1917)	Associate Justice	Smith	February 18, 1903	May 1, 1904	1 year, 73 days	Theodore Roosevelt
9		Elias Finley Johnson (1861–1933)	Associate Justice	Ladd	October 3, 1903	April 1, 1933	29 years, 180 days	Theodore Roosevelt
10		Adam Clarke Carson (1869–1941)	Associate Justice	Willard	November 16, 1904	November 30, 1920	16 years, 14 days	Theodore Roosevelt
(6)		Charles Andrew Willard (1857–1914)	Associate Justice	McDonough	January 13, 1905	May 30, 1909	4 years, 137 days	Theodore Roosevelt
11		James F. Tracey (1854–1925)	Associate Justice	Cooper	July 1, 1905	July 2, 1909	4 years, 1 day	Theodore Roosevelt
12		Sherman Moreland (1868–1951)	Associate Justice	Willard; 2nd Judicial Term	May 31, 1909 (Note: Appointed on February 1, 1909, only took oath on May 31, 1909)	April 23, 1917	8 years, 81 days	Theodore Roosevelt
13		Charles B. Elliott (1861–1935)	Associate Justice	Tracey	September 1, 1909	February 13, 1910	165 days	William Howard Taft
14		Grant Trent (1869–1943)	Associate Justice	Elliott	February 28, 1910	April 23, 1917	7 years, 54 days	William Howard Taft
15		Manuel Araullo (1853–1924)	Associate Justice	Mapa	December 16, 1913	November 1, 1921	7 years, 320 days	Woodrow Wilson
16		Thomas Street (1872–1936)	Associate Justice	Moreland	June 13, 1917	June 1, 1935	17 years, 353 days	Woodrow Wilson
17		George A. Malcolm (1881–1961)	Associate Justice	Trent	July 9, 1917	January 20, 1936	18 years, 195 days	Woodrow Wilson
18		Ramón Avanceña (1872–1957)	Associate Justice	New seat	October 31, 1917	March 31, 1925	7 years, 151 days	Woodrow Wilson
19		Frederick Charles Fisher (1879–1964)	Associate Justice	New seat	November 17, 1917	November 16, 1918	364 days	Woodrow Wilson
20		Percy Moir (1870–1928)	Associate Justice	Fisher	November 25, 1918	November 20, 1920	1 year, 361 days	Woodrow Wilson
21		Ignacio Villamor (1863–1933)	Associate Justice	F. Torres	May 19, 1920	May 25, 1933 (Note: Died in office.)	14 years, 6 days	Woodrow Wilson
(3)		Victorino Mapa (1852–1927)	Chief Justice	Arellano	July 1, 1920	October 31, 1921	1 year, 122 days	Woodrow Wilson
22		James Ostrand (1871–1937)	Associate Justice	Moir	September 27, 1921	June 30, 1933	11 years, 276 days	Warren G. Harding
23		Charles A. Johns (1857–1932)	Associate Justice	Carson	October 7, 1921	January 11, 1932	10 years, 96 days	Warren G. Harding
(15)		Manuel Araullo (1853–1924)	Chief Justice	Mapa	November 1, 1921	July 26, 1924	2 years, 268 days	Warren G. Harding
24		Norberto Romualdez (1875–1941)	Associate Justice	Araullo	November 1, 1921	April 1, 1932	10 years, 152 days	Warren G. Harding
(18)		Ramón Avanceña (1872–1957)	Chief Justice	Araullo	April 1, 1925	December 24, 1941	16 years, 267 days	Calvin Coolidge
25		Antonio Villareal (1880–1945)	Associate Justice	Avanceña	June 16, 1925	June 5, 1940	14 years, 355 days	Calvin Coolidge
26		John A. Hull (1874–1944)	Associate Justice	New seat	June 1, 1932	February 1, 1936	3 years, 245 days	Herbert Hoover
27		James C. Vickers (1877–1945)	Associate Justice	New seat	June 1, 1932	February 1, 1936	3 years, 245 days	Herbert Hoover
28		José Abad Santos (1886–1942)	Associate Justice	Johns	June 18, 1932	December 5, 1938 (Note: José Abad Santos resigned as associate justice on December 5, 1938, upon his appointment as Secretary of Justice.)	6 years, 170 days	Herbert Hoover
29		Carlos Imperial (1880–1941)	Associate Justice	Romualdez	June 22, 1932	May 20, 1941	8 years, 332 days	Herbert Hoover
30		George C. Butte (1877–1940)	Associate Justice	Johnson	July 1, 1932	February 1, 1936	3 years, 215 days	Herbert Hoover
31		Anacleto Díaz (1878–1945)	Associate Justice	I. Villamor	November 20, 1933	December 19, 1941	8 years, 29 days	Franklin D. Roosevelt
32		Leonard Goddard (1871–1959)	Associate Justice	Ostrand	January 9, 1934	February 1, 1936	2 years, 23 days	Franklin D. Roosevelt
33		Claro M. Recto (1890–1960)	Associate Justice	Street	July 3, 1935	November 1, 1936	1 year, 121 days	Franklin D. Roosevelt
34		Jose P. Laurel (1891–1959)	Associate Justice	Malcolm	February 29, 1936	February 5, 1942	5 years, 342 days	Manuel L. Quezon
35		Pedro Concepcion (1893–1969)	Associate Justice	Recto	November 1, 1936 (Note: Appointed on October 31, 1936)	January 1, 1940	3 years, 62 days	Manuel L. Quezon
36		Manuel Moran (1893–1961)	Associate Justice	Abad Santos	December 12, 1938	July 9, 1945	6 years, 209 days	Manuel L. Quezon
37		Roman Ozaeta (1891–1972)	Associate Justice	Concepcion	June 24, 1941	May 29, 1946	4 years, 339 days	Manuel L. Quezon
(28)		José Abad Santos (1886–1942)	Associate Justice	Villareal	July 16, 1941	December 24, 1941	161 days	Manuel L. Quezon
(28)		José Abad Santos (1886–1942)	Chief Justice	Avanceña	December 24, 1941	May 1, 1942 (Note: Chief Justice José Abad Santos was executed by the Imperial Japanese Army on May 1, 1942.)	128 days	Manuel L. Quezon
38		Ricardo Paras (1891–1984)	Associate Justice	C. Imperial	December 28, 1941	April 2, 1951	9 years, 95 days	Manuel L. Quezon
39		José Yulo (1894–1976)	Chief Justice	Court reorganized	February; 1942	February; 1944	3 years, 0 days to 3 years, 0 days	Masaharu Homma
40		Jorge Bocobo (1886–1965)	Associate Justice	Court reorganized	February 5, 1942	January 31, 1944	1 year, 360 days	Jorge B. Vargas
41		Jose Generoso (1881–1976)	Associate Justice	Court reorganized	May 11, 1942	July 15, 1948	6 years, 65 days	Jorge B. Vargas
42		Jose Lopez Vito (1872–1947)	Associate Justice	Court reorganized	May 11, 1942	January 31, 1944	1 year, 265 days	Jorge B. Vargas
42-A		Domingo Imperial (1890–1965)	Associate Justice	Court reorganized	May 11, 1942	January 31, 1944	1 year, 265 days	Jorge B. Vargas
43		Antonio Horrilleno (1878–1964)	Associate Justice	Court reorganized	July 1, 1943 (Note: Took his second oath of Office on November 23, 1943)	August 17, 1945	1 year, 267 days	Jose P. Laurel
44		Delfin Jaranilla (1883–1980)	Associate Justice	Court reorganized	June 6, 1945	June 6, 1946	1 year, 0 days	Sergio Osmeña
45		Felicisimo Feria (1883–1957)	Associate Justice	Court reorganized	June 6, 1945	August 6, 1953	8 years, 61 days	Sergio Osmeña
46		Mariano de Joya (1887–1964)	Associate Justice	Court reorganized	June 6, 1945	June 25, 1946	1 year, 19 days	Sergio Osmeña
47		Guillermo Pablo (1886–1982)	Associate Justice	Court reorganized	June 6, 1945	June 4, 1955	9 years, 363 days	Sergio Osmeña
48		Gregorio Perfecto (1891–1949)	Associate Justice	Court reorganized	June 6, 1945	August 17, 1949	4 years, 72 days	Sergio Osmeña
49		Emilio Hilado (1891–1967)	Associate Justice	Court reorganized	June 6, 1945	May 31, 1948	2 years, 360 days	Sergio Osmeña
50		Jose Espiritu (1886–1982)	Associate Justice	Court reorganized	June 6, 1945	August 15, 1945	70 days	Sergio Osmeña
(36)		Manuel Moran (1893–1961)	Chief Justice	Court reorganized	July 9, 1945	March 20, 1951	5 years, 254 days	Sergio Osmeña
51		Manuel Briones (1893–1957)	Associate Justice	Espiritu	September 15, 1945	May 24, 1949	3 years, 251 days	Sergio Osmeña
52		César Bengzon (1896–1992)	Associate Justice	Moran	September 15, 1945	April 28, 1961	15 years, 225 days	Sergio Osmeña
53		Sabino Padilla (1894–1986)	Associate Justice	Horilleno	June 25, 1946	September 19, 1948	2 years, 25 days	Manuel Roxas
54		Pedro Tuason (1884–1961)	Associate Justice	Ozaeta	June 25, 1946	January 4, 1954	7 years, 193 days	Manuel Roxas
55		Jose Hontiveros (1889–1954)	Associate Justice	Jaranilla	June 25, 1946	October 16, 1947	1 year, 113 days	Manuel Roxas
56		Alejandro Reyes (1899–1972)	Associate Justice	de Hoya	August 6, 1948	June 3, 1959	10 years, 301 days	Elpidio Quirino
57		Marcelino Montemayor (1890–1971)	Associate Justice	Hontiveros	August 21, 1948	June 27, 1960	11 years, 311 days	Elpidio Quirino
(37)		Roman Ozaeta (1891–1972)	Associate Justice	Hilado	September 19, 1948	February 28, 1950	1 year, 162 days	Elpidio Quirino
53		Sabino Padilla (1894–1986)	Associate Justice	Generoso	June 30, 1949	August 21, 1964	15 years, 79 days	Elpidio Quirino
58		Luis Torres (1880–1959)	Associate Justice	S. Padilla; First Judicial Term	August 20, 1949	April 1, 1950	224 days	Elpidio Quirino
59		Felix Angelo Bautista (1896–1990)	Associate Justice	L. Torres	October 20, 1950	May 20, 1956	5 years, 213 days	Elpidio Quirino
60		Fernando Jugo (1891–1956)	Associate Justice	Briones	October 20, 1950	June 3, 1956	5 years, 227 days	Elpidio Quirino
(38)		Ricardo Paras (1891–1984)	Chief Justice	Moran	April 2, 1951	February 17, 1961	9 years, 321 days	Elpidio Quirino
61		Alejo Labrador (1894–1967)	Associate Justice	Perfecto	April 22, 1952	July 17, 1964	12 years, 86 days	Elpidio Quirino
62		Roberto Concepcion (1903–1987)	Associate Justice	Ozaeta; 2nd Supreme Court term	February 9, 1954	June 17, 1966	12 years, 128 days	Ramon Magsaysay
63		Ramón Diokno (1886–1954)	Associate Justice	R. Paras	February 10, 1954	April 21, 1954	70 days	Ramon Magsaysay
64		J. B. L. Reyes (1902–1994)	Associate Justice	Feria	June 30, 1954	August 19, 1972	18 years, 50 days	Ramon Magsaysay
65		Pastor Endencia (1890–1981)	Associate Justice	Tuason	December 20, 1955	July 26, 1960	4 years, 219 days	Ramon Magsaysay
66		Alfonso Felix (1888–1968)	Associate Justice	Diokno	July 24, 1956	September 17, 1958	2 years, 55 days	Ramon Magsaysay
67		Jesus Barrera (1896–1988)	Associate Justice	Pablo	June 5, 1959	December 18, 1966	7 years, 196 days	Carlos P. Garcia
68		Jose Gutierrez David (1891–1977)	Associate Justice	Bautista	August 28, 1959	January 29, 1961	1 year, 154 days	Carlos P. Garcia
69		Arsenio Dizon (1901–1990)	Associate Justice	Jugo	July 26, 1960	October 5, 1971	11 years, 71 days	Carlos P. Garcia
70		Jose Maria Paredes (1895–1977)	Associate Justice	Felix	August 18, 1960	August 15, 1965	4 years, 362 days	Carlos P. Garcia
(52)		César Bengzon (1896–1992)	Chief Justice	R. Paras	April 28, 1961	May 29, 1966	5 years, 31 days	Carlos P. Garcia
71		Dionisio de Leon (1892–1963)	Associate Justice	Montemayor	April 28, 1961	April 8, 1962	345 days	Carlos P. Garcia
72		Felipe Natividad (1891–1965)	Associate Justice	Endencia	April 28, 1961	September 20, 1961	145 days	Carlos P. Garcia
73		Roberto Regala (1897–1979)	Associate Justice	A. Reyes	May 23, 1962	June 7, 1967	5 years, 15 days	Diosdado Macapagal
74		Querube Makalintal (1910–2002)	Associate Justice	David	May 23, 1962	October 21, 1973	11 years, 151 days	Diosdado Macapagal
75		Calixto Zaldivar (1904–1979)	Associate Justice	C. Bengzon	September 12, 1964	September 13, 1974	10 years, 1 day	Diosdado Macapagal
76		Jose P. Bengzon (1898–1990)	Associate Justice	Natividad	September 12, 1964	May 5, 1968	3 years, 236 days	Diosdado Macapagal
77		Conrado Sanchez (1900–1983)	Associate Justice	De Leon	May 29, 1966	February 19, 1970	3 years, 266 days	Ferdinand Marcos
78		Fred Ruiz Castro (1914–1979)	Associate Justice	Labrador	May 29, 1966	January 5, 1976	9 years, 221 days	Ferdinand Marcos
(62)		Roberto Concepcion (1903–1987)	Chief Justice	C. Bengzon	June 17, 1966	April 18, 1973	6 years, 305 days	Ferdinand Marcos
79		Eugenio Angeles (1898–1977)	Associate Justice	S. Padilla; 2nd Supreme Court term	June 30, 1967	November 2, 1968	1 year, 125 days	Ferdinand Marcos
80		Enrique Fernando (1915–2004)	Associate Justice	Paredes	June 30, 1967	July 2, 1979	12 years, 2 days	Ferdinand Marcos
81		Francisco Capistrano (1899–1980)	Associate Justice	Concepcion	September 16, 1968	October 6, 1969	1 year, 20 days	Ferdinand Marcos
82		Claudio Teehankee (1918–1989)	Associate Justice	Barrera	December 17, 1968	April 1, 1986	17 years, 105 days	Ferdinand Marcos
83		Antonio Barredo (1912–1996)	Associate Justice	Regala	December 17, 1968	October 4, 1982	13 years, 291 days	Ferdinand Marcos
84		Julio Villamor (1902–1988)	Associate Justice	J. Bengzon	January 17, 1970	April 12, 1972	2 years, 79 days	Ferdinand Marcos
85		Felix Makasiar (1915–1992)	Associate Justice	Capistrano	August 2, 1970	July 25, 1985	14 years, 357 days	Ferdinand Marcos
86		Salvador Esguerra (1906–1979)	Associate Justice	Angeles	June 17, 1972	June 19, 1976	4 years, 2 days	Ferdinand Marcos
87		Felix Antonio (1911–1991)	Associate Justice	Sanchez	June 30, 1972	May 18, 1980	7 years, 323 days	Ferdinand Marcos
88		Estanislao Fernandez (1910–1982)	Associate Justice	Dizon	October 19, 1973	March 28, 1975	1 year, 160 days	Ferdinand Marcos
(74)		Querube Makalintal (1910–2002)	Chief Justice	Concepcion	October 21, 1973	December 22, 1975	2 years, 62 days	Ferdinand Marcos
89		Cecilia Muñoz-Palma (1913–2006)	Associate Justice	New seat	October 29, 1973	November 22, 1978	5 years, 24 days	Ferdinand Marcos
90		Ramon Aquino (1917–1993)	Associate Justice	New seat	October 29, 1973	November 19, 1985	12 years, 21 days	Ferdinand Marcos
91		Hermogenes Concepcion Jr. (1920–2018)	Associate Justice	J. Villanor	April 18, 1975	April 16, 1986	10 years, 363 days	Ferdinand Marcos
92		Ruperto Martin (1913–1997)	Associate Justice	J. B. L. Reyes	April 18, 1975	January 10, 1978	2 years, 267 days	Ferdinand Marcos
(78)		Fred Ruiz Castro (1914–1979)	Chief Justice	Makalintal	January 5, 1976	April 19, 1979	3 years, 104 days	Ferdinand Marcos
93		Juvenal Guerrero (1916–1991)	Associate Justice	Makalintal	May 11, 1977	November 4, 1984	7 years, 177 days	Ferdinand Marcos
94		Guillermo Santos (1915–1991)	Associate Justice	Zaldivar	May 11, 1977	January 23, 1980	2 years, 257 days	Ferdinand Marcos
95		Ramon Fernandez (1916–1997)	Associate Justice	E. Fernandez	May 27, 1977	May 11, 1982	4 years, 349 days	Ferdinand Marcos
96		Vicente Abad Santos (1916–1993)	Associate Justice	Castro	January 17, 1979	July 12, 1986	7 years, 176 days	Ferdinand Marcos
97		Pacifico de Castro (1915–2000)	Associate Justice	Esguerra	January 17, 1979	May 31, 1984	5 years, 135 days	Ferdinand Marcos
98		Ameurfina Melencio-Herrera (1922–2020)	Associate Justice	Muñoz-Palma	January 17, 1979	May 11, 1992	13 years, 115 days	Ferdinand Marcos
(80)		Enrique Fernando (1915–2004)	Chief Justice	Castro	July 2, 1979	July 24, 1985	6 years, 22 days	Ferdinand Marcos
99		Vicente Ericta (1915–2007)	Associate Justice	Martin	November 20, 1981	May 11, 1982	172 days	Ferdinand Marcos
100		Efren Plana (1928–2012)	Associate Justice	Fernando	November 20, 1981	April 16, 1986	4 years, 147 days	Ferdinand Marcos
101		Venicio Escolin (1921–2008)	Associate Justice	Santos	November 20, 1981	April 15, 1986	4 years, 146 days	Ferdinand Marcos
102		Conrado M. Vasquez (1913–2006)	Associate Justice	Antonio	May 14, 1982	September 3, 1983	1 year, 112 days	Ferdinand Marcos
103		Lorenzo Relova (1916–2014)	Associate Justice	R. Fernandez	May 14, 1982	January 19, 1986	3 years, 250 days	Ferdinand Marcos
104		Hugo Gutierrez Jr. (1927–2013)	Associate Justice	Ercita	May 14, 1982	March 31, 1993	10 years, 321 days	Ferdinand Marcos
105		Buenaventura de la Fuente (1922–2000)	Associate Justice	Barredo	February 28, 1984	March 6, 1986	2 years, 6 days	Ferdinand Marcos
106		Serafin R. Cuevas (1928–2014)	Associate Justice	Vasquez	June 1, 1984	April 16, 1986	1 year, 319 days	Ferdinand Marcos
107		Nestor Alampay (1920–1995)	Associate Justice	De Castro	January 24, 1985	March 17, 1987	1 year, 52 days	Ferdinand Marcos
(85)		Felix Makasiar (1915–1992)	Chief Justice	Fernando	July 25, 1985	November 19, 1985	117 days	Ferdinand Marcos
108		Lino Patajo (1916–2010)	Associate Justice	Guerrero	July 31, 1985	April 16, 1986	259 days	Ferdinand Marcos
(90)		Ramon Aquino (1917–1993)	Chief Justice	Makasiar	November 20, 1985	March 6, 1986	106 days	Ferdinand Marcos
(82)		Claudio Teehankee (1918–1989)	Chief Justice	Court reorganized	April 2, 1986	April 18, 1988	2 years, 16 days	Corazon Aquino
109		Jose Feria (1917–2008)	Associate Justice	Court reorganized	April 7, 1986	January 10, 1987	278 days	Corazon Aquino
110		Pedro Yap (1918–2003)	Associate Justice	Court reorganized	April 8, 1986	April 18, 1988	2 years, 10 days	Corazon Aquino
111		Marcelo Fernan (1926–1999)	Associate Justice	Court reorganized	April 9, 1986	July 1, 1988	2 years, 83 days	Corazon Aquino
112		Andres Narvasa (1928–2013)	Associate Justice	Court reorganized	April 10, 1986	December 7, 1991	5 years, 241 days	Corazon Aquino
113		Isagani Cruz (1924–2013)	Associate Justice	Court reorganized	April 16, 1986	October 11, 1994	8 years, 178 days	Corazon Aquino
114		Edgardo Paras (1922–1994)	Associate Justice	Court reorganized	April 16, 1986	July 4, 1992	6 years, 79 days	Corazon Aquino
115		Florentino P. Feliciano (1928–2015)	Associate Justice	Court reorganized	August 18, 1986	December 13, 1995	9 years, 117 days	Corazon Aquino
116		Teodoro Padilla (1927–1999)	Associate Justice	Court reorganized	January 12, 1987	August 22, 1997	10 years, 222 days	Corazon Aquino
117		Abdulwahid Bidin (1925–1999)	Associate Justice	Court reorganized	January 12, 1987	April 7, 1995	8 years, 85 days	Corazon Aquino
118		Emilio Gancayco (1921–2009)	Associate Justice	Court reorganized	January 12, 1987	August 20, 1991	4 years, 220 days	Corazon Aquino
119		Abraham Sarmiento (1921–2010)	Associate Justice	V. Abad Santos	January 25, 1987	October 8, 1991	4 years, 256 days	Corazon Aquino
120		Irene Cortes (1921–1996)	Associate Justice	J. Feria	February 1, 1987	October 20, 1990	3 years, 261 days	Corazon Aquino
121		Carolina Griño-Aquino (1923–2012)	Associate Justice	Alampay	February 2, 1988	October 22, 1993	5 years, 262 days	Corazon Aquino
(110)		Pedro Yap (1918–2003)	Chief Justice	Teehankee	April 19, 1988	June 30, 1988	72 days	Corazon Aquino
122		Leo Medialdea (1927–1992)	Associate Justice	Yap	May 2, 1988	November 7, 1992	4 years, 189 days	Corazon Aquino
(111)		Marcelo Fernan (1926–1999)	Chief Justice	Yap	July 1, 1988	December 6, 1991	3 years, 158 days	Corazon Aquino
123		Florenz Regalado (1928–2015)	Associate Justice	Fernan	July 29, 1988	October 13, 1998	10 years, 76 days	Corazon Aquino
124		Hilario Davide Jr. (born 1935)	Associate Justice	Cortes	January 24, 1991	November 29, 1998	7 years, 278 days	Corazon Aquino
125		Flerida Ruth Pineda-Romero (1929–2017)	Associate Justice	Sarmiento	October 21, 1991	August 1, 1999	7 years, 284 days	Corazon Aquino
126		Rodolfo Nocon (1928–2000)	Associate Justice	Gancayco	December 2, 1991	March 15, 1994	2 years, 103 days	Corazon Aquino
(112)		Andres Narvasa (1928–2013)	Chief Justice	Fernan	December 8, 1991	November 30, 1998	6 years, 357 days	Corazon Aquino
127		Josue Bellosillo (born 1933)	Associate Justice	Narvasa	March 3, 1992	November 13, 2003	11 years, 255 days	Corazon Aquino
128		Jose Melo (1932–2020)	Associate Justice	Melencio-Herrera	August 10, 1992	May 30, 2002	9 years, 293 days	Fidel V. Ramos
129		Jose C. Campos (1923–2005)	Associate Justice	E. Paras	September 3, 1992	April 9, 1993	218 days	Fidel V. Ramos
130		Camilo Quiason (1925–2014)	Associate Justice	Medialdea	February 1, 1993	July 18, 1995	2 years, 167 days	Fidel V. Ramos
131		Reynato Puno (born 1940)	Associate Justice	Gutierrez	June 28, 1993	December 7, 2006	13 years, 162 days	Fidel V. Ramos
132		Jose C. Vitug (born 1934)	Associate Justice	Campos	June 28, 1993	July 15, 2004	11 years, 17 days	Fidel V. Ramos
133		Santiago Kapunan (born 1932)	Associate Justice	Griño-Aquino	January 5, 1994	August 12, 2002	8 years, 219 days	Fidel V. Ramos
134		Vicente V. Mendoza (born 1933)	Associate Justice	Nocon	June 7, 1994	April 5, 2003	8 years, 302 days	Fidel V. Ramos
135		Ricardo Francisco (1928–2001)	Associate Justice	Cruz	January 5, 1995	February 13, 1998	3 years, 39 days	Fidel V. Ramos
136		Regino C. Hermosisima Jr. (born 1927)	Associate Justice	Bidin	July 10, 1995	October 18, 1997	2 years, 100 days	Fidel V. Ramos
137		Artemio Panganiban (born 1937)	Associate Justice	Quiason	October 5, 1995	December 19, 2005	10 years, 75 days	Fidel V. Ramos
138		Justo Torres Jr. (1927–2017)	Associate Justice	Feliciano	March 11, 1996	November 1, 1997	1 year, 235 days	Fidel V. Ramos
139		Antonio Martinez (1929–2007)	Associate Justice	T. Padilla	November 17, 1997	February 2, 1999	1 year, 77 days	Fidel V. Ramos
140		Leonardo Quisumbing (1939–2019)	Associate Justice	Hermosisima	January 15, 1998	November 6, 2009	11 years, 295 days	Fidel V. Ramos
141		Fidel Purisima (1930–2013)	Associate Justice	J. Torres	January 27, 1998	October 28, 2000	2 years, 275 days	Fidel V. Ramos
142		Bernardo P. Pardo (1932-2025)	Associate Justice	Francisco	September 30, 1998	February 11, 2002	3 years, 134 days	Joseph Estrada
(124)		Hilario Davide Jr. (born 1935)	Chief Justice	Narvasa	November 30, 1998	December 20, 2005	7 years, 20 days	Joseph Estrada
143		Arturo Buena (1932–2020)	Associate Justice	Regalado	January 5, 1999	March 25, 2002	3 years, 79 days	Joseph Estrada
144		Minerva Gonzaga-Reyes (born 1931)	Associate Justice	Davide	January 5, 1999	September 25, 2001	2 years, 263 days	Joseph Estrada
145		Consuelo Ynares-Santiago (born 1939)	Associate Justice	Martinez	April 6, 1999	October 5, 2009	10 years, 182 days	Joseph Estrada
146		Sabino de Leon Jr. (1932–2003)	Associate Justice	Pineda-Romero	October 11, 1999	June 9, 2002	2 years, 241 days	Joseph Estrada
147		Angelina Sandoval-Gutierrez (born 1938)	Associate Justice	Purisima	December 22, 2000	February 28, 2008	7 years, 68 days	Joseph Estrada
148		Antonio Carpio (born 1949)	Associate Justice	Gonzaga-Reyes	October 26, 2001	October 26, 2019	18 years, 0 days	Gloria Macapagal Arroyo
149		Alicia Austria-Martinez (born 1940)	Associate Justice	Pardo	April 9, 2002	April 30, 2009	7 years, 21 days	Gloria Macapagal Arroyo
150		Renato Corona (1948–2016)	Associate Justice	Buena	April 9, 2002	May 17, 2010	8 years, 38 days	Gloria Macapagal Arroyo
151		Conchita Carpio-Morales (born 1941)	Associate Justice	Melo	August 26, 2002	June 19, 2011	8 years, 297 days	Gloria Macapagal Arroyo
152		Romeo Callejo Sr. (1937–2023)	Associate Justice	S. De Leon	August 26, 2002	April 28, 2007	4 years, 245 days	Gloria Macapagal Arroyo
153		Adolfo Azcuna (born 1939)	Associate Justice	Kapunan	October 24, 2002	February 16, 2009	6 years, 115 days	Gloria Macapagal Arroyo
154		Dante Tiñga (born 1939)	Associate Justice	V. Mendoza	July 4, 2003	May 11, 2009	5 years, 311 days	Gloria Macapagal Arroyo
155		Minita Chico-Nazario (1939–2022)	Associate Justice	Bellosillo	February 10, 2004	December 5, 2009	5 years, 298 days	Gloria Macapagal Arroyo
156		Cancio Garcia (1937–2013)	Associate Justice	Vitug	October 7, 2004	October 30, 2007	3 years, 23 days	Gloria Macapagal Arroyo
(137)		Artemio Panganiban (born 1937)	Chief Justice	Davide	December 20, 2005	December 7, 2006	352 days	Gloria Macapagal Arroyo
157		Presbitero Velasco Jr. (born 1948)	Associate Justice	Panganiban	March 31, 2006	August 8, 2018	12 years, 130 days	Gloria Macapagal Arroyo
(131)		Reynato Puno (born 1940)	Chief Justice	Panganiban	December 8, 2006	May 17, 2010	3 years, 160 days	Gloria Macapagal Arroyo
158		Antonio Nachura (1941–2022)	Associate Justice	Puno	February 7, 2007	June 13, 2011	4 years, 126 days	Gloria Macapagal Arroyo
159		Ruben Reyes (1939–2021)	Associate Justice	Callejo	August 2, 2007	January 3, 2009	4 years, 126 days	Gloria Macapagal Arroyo
160		Teresita de Castro (born 1948)	Associate Justice	Garcia	December 3, 2007	August 28, 2018	10 years, 268 days	Gloria Macapagal Arroyo
161		Arturo Brion (born 1946)	Associate Justice	Sandoval-Gutierrez	March 17, 2008	December 29, 2016	8 years, 287 days	Gloria Macapagal Arroyo
162		Diosdado Peralta (born 1952)	Associate Justice	R. Reyes	January 14, 2009	October 23, 2019	10 years, 282 days	Gloria Macapagal Arroyo
163		Lucas Bersamin (born 1949)	Associate Justice	Azcuna	April 3, 2009	November 26, 2018	9 years, 237 days	Gloria Macapagal Arroyo
164		Mariano del Castillo (born 1949)	Associate Justice	Austria-Martinez	July 29, 2009	July 29, 2019	10 years, 0 days	Gloria Macapagal Arroyo
165		Roberto A. Abad (born 1944)	Associate Justice	Tiñga	August 7, 2009	May 22, 2014	4 years, 288 days	Gloria Macapagal Arroyo
166		Martin Villarama Jr. (born 1946)	Associate Justice	Ynares-Santiago	November 6, 2009	January 16, 2016	6 years, 71 days	Gloria Macapagal Arroyo
167	Jose P. Perez	Jose P. Perez (1946–2021)	Associate Justice	Quisumbing	December 26, 2009	December 14, 2016	6 years, 354 days	Gloria Macapagal Arroyo
168		Jose C. Mendoza (born 1947)	Associate Justice	Chico-Nazario	January 4, 2010	August 13, 2017	7 years, 221 days	Gloria Macapagal Arroyo
(150)		Renato Corona (1948–2016)	Chief Justice	Puno	May 17, 2010	May 29, 2012 (Note: Chief Justice Renato Corona was impeached by the House of Representatives on December 12, 2011, and convicted by the Senate sitting as an impeachment court on May 29, 2012.)	2 years, 12 days	Gloria Macapagal Arroyo
169		Maria Lourdes Sereno (born 1960)	Associate Justice	Corona	August 13, 2010	August 24, 2012	2 years, 11 days	Benigno Aquino III
170		Bienvenido Reyes (born 1947)	Associate Justice	Nachura	August 20, 2011	July 6, 2017	5 years, 320 days	Benigno Aquino III
171		Estela Perlas-Bernabe (born 1952)	Associate Justice	Carpio-Morales	September 16, 2011	May 14, 2022	10 years, 240 days	Benigno Aquino III
(169)		Maria Lourdes Sereno (born 1960)	Chief Justice	Corona	August 25, 2012	May 11, 2018 (Note: Maria Lourdes Sereno was removed as chief justice by the Supreme Court on May 11, 2018, over a quo warranto petition, making her appointment as chief justice null and void.)	5 years, 259 days	Benigno Aquino III
172		Marvic Leonen (born 1962)	Associate Justice	Sereno	November 21, 2012	Incumbent	14 years, 0 days	Benigno Aquino III
173		Francis Jardeleza (born 1949)	Associate Justice	Abad	August 19, 2014	September 26, 2019	5 years, 38 days	Benigno Aquino III
174		Alfredo Benjamin Caguioa (born 1959)	Associate Justice	Villarama	January 22, 2016	Incumbent	10 years, 303 days	Benigno Aquino III
175		Samuel Martires (born 1949)	Associate Justice	Perez	March 2, 2017	August 3, 2018	1 year, 154 days	Rodrigo Duterte
176		Noel Tijam (born 1949)	Associate Justice	Brion	March 8, 2017	January 5, 2019	1 year, 303 days	Rodrigo Duterte
177		Andres Reyes Jr. (born 1950)	Associate Justice	B. Reyes	July 12, 2017	May 11, 2020	2 years, 304 days	Rodrigo Duterte
178		Alexander Gesmundo (born 1956)	Associate Justice	J. Mendoza	August 14, 2017	April 5, 2021	3 years, 234 days	Rodrigo Duterte
179		Jose Reyes Jr. (born 1950)	Associate Justice	Velasco	August 9, 2018	September 18, 2020	2 years, 40 days	Rodrigo Duterte
(160)		Teresita de Castro (born 1948)	Chief Justice	Sereno	August 28, 2018	October 10, 2018	43 days	Rodrigo Duterte
180		Ramon Paul Hernando (born 1966)	Associate Justice	Martires	October 10, 2018	Incumbent	8 years, 42 days	Rodrigo Duterte
(163)		Lucas Bersamin (born 1949)	Chief Justice	T. De Castro	November 26, 2018	October 18, 2019	326 days	Rodrigo Duterte
181		Rosmari Carandang (born 1952)	Associate Justice	T. De Castro	November 26, 2018	January 9, 2022	3 years, 44 days	Rodrigo Duterte
182		Amy Lazaro-Javier (born 1956)	Associate Justice	Tijam	March 6, 2019	November 16, 2026	7 years, 255 days	Rodrigo Duterte
183		Henri Jean Paul Inting (born 1957)	Associate Justice	Bersamin	May 27, 2019	Incumbent	7 years, 178 days	Rodrigo Duterte
184		Rodil Zalameda (born 1963)	Associate Justice	Del Castillo	August 5, 2019	November 6, 2026	7 years, 93 days	Rodrigo Duterte
(162)		Diosdado Peralta (born 1952)	Chief Justice	Bersamin	October 23, 2019	March 27, 2021	1 year, 155 days	Rodrigo Duterte
185		Mario Lopez (born 1955)	Associate Justice	Jardeleza	December 3, 2019	June 4, 2025	5 years, 183 days	Rodrigo Duterte
186		Edgardo Delos Santos (born 1952)	Associate Justice	Carpio	December 3, 2019	June 30, 2021	1 year, 209 days	Rodrigo Duterte
187		Samuel Gaerlan (born 1958)	Associate Justice	Peralta	January 8, 2020	Incumbent	6 years, 317 days	Rodrigo Duterte
188		Priscilla Baltazar-Padilla (1958–2021)	Associate Justice	A. Reyes	July 16, 2020	November 3, 2020	110 days	Rodrigo Duterte
189		Ricardo Rosario (born 1958)	Associate Justice	J. Reyes	October 8, 2020	Incumbent	6 years, 44 days	Rodrigo Duterte
190		Jhosep Lopez (born 1963)	Associate Justice	Baltazar-Padilla	January 26, 2021	Incumbent	5 years, 299 days	Rodrigo Duterte
(178)		Alexander Gesmundo (born 1956)	Chief Justice	Peralta	April 5, 2021	November 6, 2026	5 years, 215 days	Rodrigo Duterte
191		Japar Dimaampao (born 1963)	Associate Justice	Gesmundo	July 2, 2021	Incumbent	5 years, 142 days	Rodrigo Duterte
192		Midas Marquez (born 1966)	Associate Justice	Delos Santos	September 27, 2021	Incumbent	5 years, 55 days	Rodrigo Duterte
193		Antonio Kho Jr. (born 1966)	Associate Justice	Carandang	February 23, 2022	Incumbent	4 years, 271 days	Rodrigo Duterte
194		Maria Filomena Singh (born 1966)	Associate Justice	Perlas-Bernabe	May 18, 2022	Incumbent	4 years, 187 days	Rodrigo Duterte
195		Raul Villanueva (born 1963)	Associate Justice	Lopez	June 9, 2025	Incumbent	1 year, 165 days	Bongbong Marcos
(184)		Rodil Zalameda (born 1963)	Chief Justice	Gesmundo	November 6, 2026	Incumbent	15 days	Bongbong Marcos
196		Gamaliel Cordoba	Associate Justice	Lazaro-Javier	November 16, 2026	Incumbent	5 days	Bongbong Marcos

== Demographics ==
=== Age ===
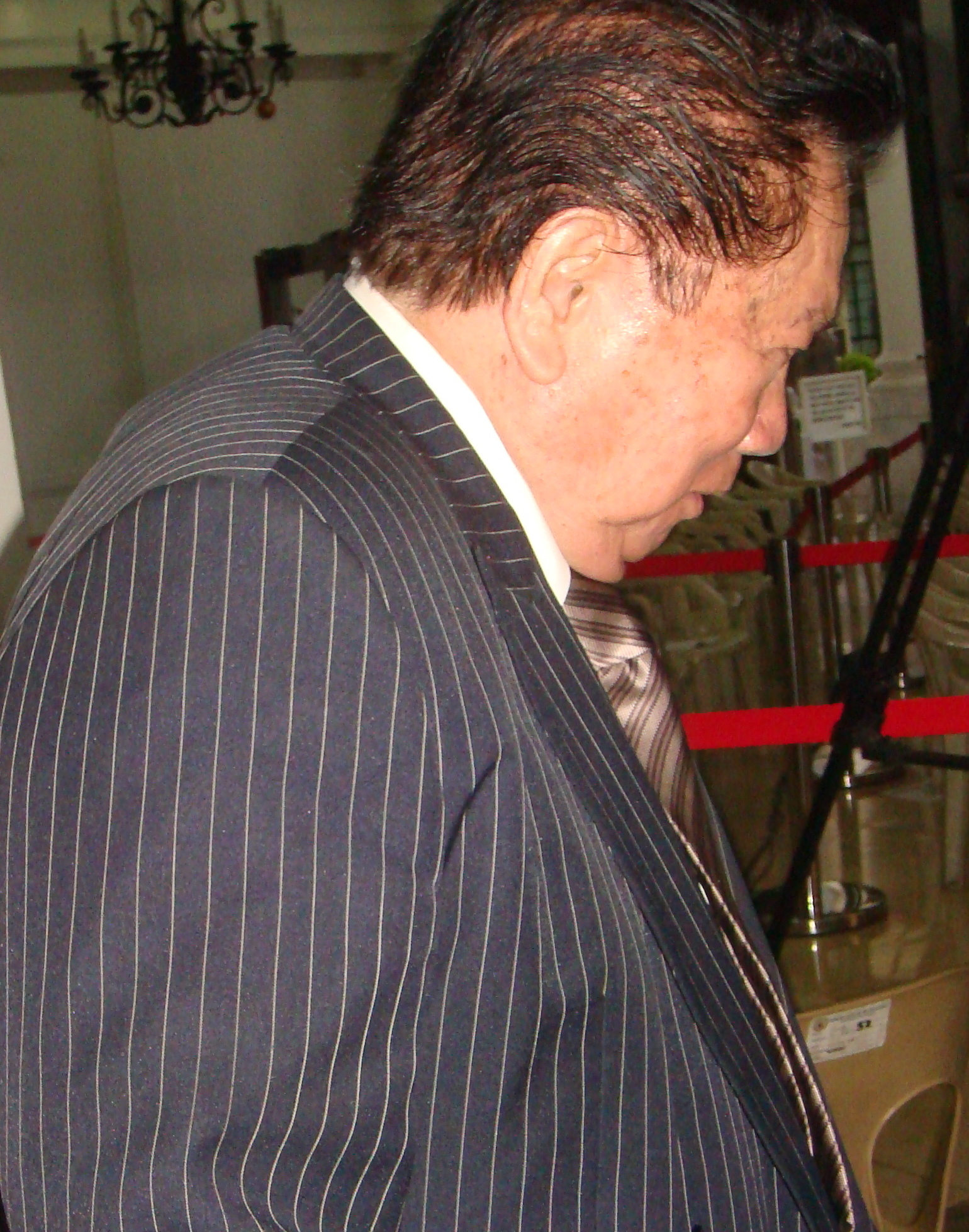
Regino C. Hermosisima, Jr., the longest lived living Justice of the Supreme court

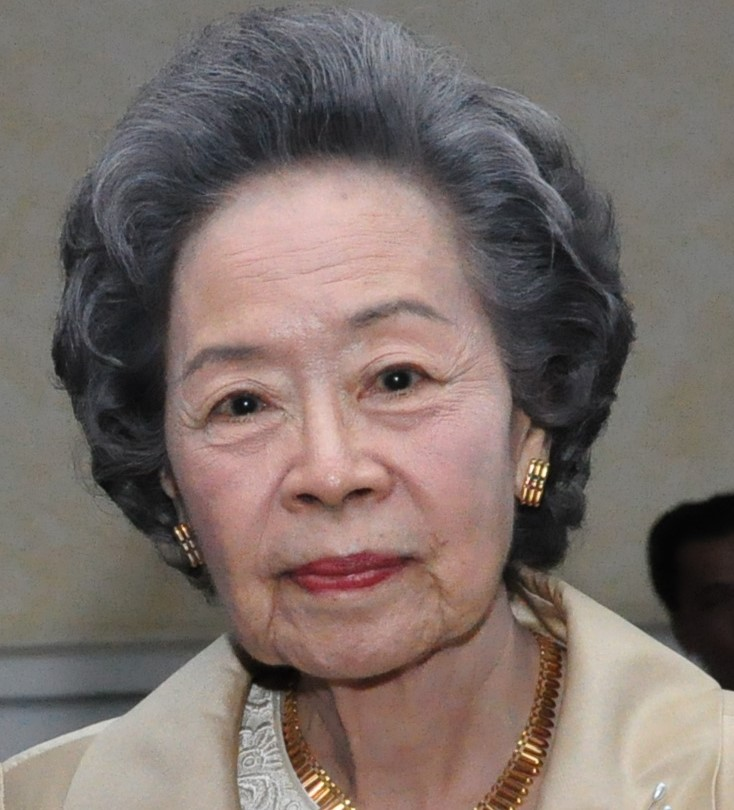
Ameurfina Melencio-Herrera, the longest-lived Female Justice of the Supreme court

Justice	Born	Died	Age
Roberto A. Abad	May 22, 1944	Alive	82 years, 183 days
José Abad Santos	February 19, 1886	May 1, 1942	54 years, 156 days
Vicente Abad Santos	July 12, 1916	December 30, 1993	76 years, 301 days
Nestor Alampay	February 17, 1920	December 2, 1995	75 years, 288 days
Eugenio Angeles	November 2, 1898	November 4, 1977	79 years, 2 days
Felix Antonio	May 18, 1911	August 4, 1991	80 years, 78 days
Ramon Aquino	August 31, 1917	March 31, 1993	75 years, 212 days
Manuel Araullo	January 1, 1853	July 26, 1924	71 years, 207 days
Cayetano Arellano	March 2, 1847	December 23, 1920	73 years, 296 days
Alicia Austria-Martinez	December 19, 1940	Alive	85 years, 337 days
Ramón Avanceña	April 13, 1872	June 12, 1957	85 years, 60 days
Adolfo Azcuna	February 16, 1939	Alive	87 years, 278 days
Priscilla Baltazar-Padilla	July 2, 1958	August 27, 2021	63 years, 56 days
Antonio Barredo	October 1, 1912	November 5, 1996	84 years, 35 days
Jesus Barrera	December 18, 1896	August 28, 1988	91 years, 254 days
Felix Angelo Bautista	May 20, 1896	April 12, 1990	93 years, 326 days
Josue Bellosillo	November 13, 1933	Alive	93 years, 8 days
César Bengzon	May 29, 1896	September 3, 1992	96 years, 97 days
Jose Bengzon	May 5, 1898	February 4, 1990	91 years, 275 days
Lucas Bersamin	October 18, 1949	Alive	77 years, 34 days
Abdulwahid Bidin	April 7, 1925	February 2, 1999	73 years, 301 days
Jorge Bocobo	October 19, 1886	July 23, 1965	72 years, 230 days
Arturo Brion	December 29, 1946	Alive	79 years, 327 days
Manuel C. Briones	January 1, 1893	September 29, 1957	64 years, 271 days
Arturo Buena	March 25, 1932	February 13, 2020	87 years, 325 days
George C. Butte	May 9, 1877	January 18, 1940	62 years, 254 days
Alfredo Benjamin Caguioa	September 30, 1959	Alive	67 years, 52 days
Romeo Callejo Sr.	April 28, 1937	September 19, 2022	86 years, 144 days
Jose C. Campos	April 9, 1923	January 4, 2005	81 years, 270 days
Francisco Capistrano	October 6, 1899	December 10, 1987	88 years, 65 days
Rosmari Carandang	January 9, 1952	Alive	74 years, 316 days
Antonio Carpio	October 26, 1949	Alive	77 years, 26 days
Conchita Carpio-Morales	June 19, 1941	Alive	85 years, 155 days
Adam Clarke Carson	January 14, 1869	May 23, 1941	72 years, 129 days
Fred Ruiz Castro	September 2, 1914	April 19, 1979	64 years, 229 days
Minita V. Chico-Nazario	December 5, 1939	February 16, 2022	82 years, 73 days
Hermogenes Concepcion Jr.	April 2, 1920	November 26, 2018	98 years, 238 days
Pedro Concepción	April 18, 1893	May 11, 1969	76 years, 23 days
Roberto R. Concepcion	June 7, 1903	May 3, 1987	83 years, 330 days
Joseph F. Cooper	March 30, 1854	April 18, 1942	88 years, 19 days
Gamaliel Cordoba	—	Alive	—
Renato Corona	October 15, 1948	April 29, 2016	67 years, 197 days
Irene Cortes	October 20, 1921	October 28, 1996	75 years, 8 days
Isagani Cruz	October 11, 1924	March 21, 2013	88 years, 161 days
Serafin R. Cuevas	June 25, 1928	February 9, 2014	85 years, 229 days
Hilario Davide Jr.	December 20, 1935	Alive	90 years, 336 days
Pacifico de Castro	July 16, 1915	May 22, 2000	84 years, 311 days
Teresita de Castro	October 8, 1948	Alive	78 years, 44 days
Mariano de Joya	September 8, 1887	July 5, 1964	76 years, 301 days
Buenaventura de la Fuente	July 14, 1922	June 7, 2000	77 years, 171 days
Dionisio de Leon	April 8, 1892	March 17, 1963	70 years, 343 days
Sabino de Leon Jr.	June 9, 1932	June 16, 2003	71 years, 7 days
Mariano del Castillo	July 29, 1949	Alive	77 years, 115 days
Edgardo Delos Santos	June 12, 1952	Alive	74 years, 162 days
Anacleto Diaz	November 20, 1878	February 10, 1945	66 years, 82 days
Japar Dimaampao	December 27, 1963	Alive	62 years, 329 days
Ramon Diokno	March 28, 1886	April 21, 1954	68 years, 242 days
Arsenio Dizon	October 5, 1901	January 30, 1990	88 years, 117 days
Charles B. Elliott	January 6, 1861	September 18, 1935	74 years, 255 days
Pastor Endencia	July 26, 1890	July 22, 1981	90 years, 361 days
Vicente Ericta	February 3, 1915	February 7, 2007	92 years, 4 days
Venicio Escolin	February 13, 1921	March 29, 2008	87 years, 45 days
Salvador Esguerra	June 19, 1906	February 12, 1979	72 years, 238 days
Jose Espiritu	April 10, 1886	May 30, 1982	96 years, 50 days
Florentino P. Feliciano	March 14, 1928	December 15, 2015	87 years, 276 days
Alfonso Felix	September 17, 1888	April 7, 1975	86 years, 202 days
Felicisimo Feria	August 6, 1883	June 2, 1957	73 years, 300 days
Jose Feria	January 11, 1917	May 8, 2008	91 years, 118 days
Marcelo Fernan	October 24, 1926	July 11, 1999	72 years, 260 days
Estanislao Fernandez	March 28, 1910	July 28, 1982	72 years, 122 days
Ramon Fernandez	February 16, 1916	March 25, 1997	81 years, 37 days
Enrique Fernando	July 25, 1915	October 13, 2004	89 years, 80 days
Frederick Charles Fisher	January 16, 1879	August 17, 1964	85 years, 214 days
Ricardo Francisco	February 13, 1928	December 14, 2001	73 years, 304 days
Samuel Gaerlan	December 19, 1958	Alive	67 years, 337 days
Emilio Gancayco	August 20, 1921	July 27, 2009	87 years, 341 days
Cancio C. Garcia	October 20, 1937	October 15, 2013	75 years, 360 days
Jose Generoso	December 19, 1890	April 14, 1976	85 years, 117 days
Alexander Gesmundo	November 6, 1956	Alive	70 years, 15 days
Leonard Goddard	January 29, 1871	June 6, 1959	88 years, 128 days
Minerva Gonzaga-Reyes	September 25, 1931	Alive	95 years, 57 days
Carolina Griño-Aquino	October 22, 1923	December 24, 2012	89 years, 63 days
Juvenal Guerrero	November 4, 1916	May 8, 1991	74 years, 185 days
Hugo Gutierrez Jr.	January 29, 1927	June 12, 2013	86 years, 134 days
Jose Gutierrez David	January 29, 1891	March 27, 1977	86 years, 57 days
Regino C. Hermosisima Jr.	October 18, 1927	Alive	99 years, 34 days
Ramon Paul Hernando	August 27, 1966	Alive	60 years, 86 days
Emilio Hilado	November 1, 1891	October 25, 1967	75 years, 358 days
Jose Hontiveros	March 19, 1889	May 21, 1954	65 years, 63 days
Antonio Horrilleno	February 13, 1878	September 5, 1964	86 years, 205 days
John A. Hull	August 7, 1874	April 17, 1944	69 years, 254 days
Carlos Imperial	November 4, 1880	May 20, 1941	60 years, 197 days
Domingo Imperial	August 4, 1890	July 19, 1965	74 years, 349 days
Henri Jean Paul Inting	September 4, 1957	Alive	69 years, 78 days
Delfin Jaranilla	December 24, 1883	June 4, 1980	96 years, 163 days
Francis Jardeleza	September 26, 1949	Alive	77 years, 56 days
Charles A. Johns	June 25, 1857	January 11, 1932	74 years, 200 days
Elias Finley Johnson	June 24, 1861	August 1, 1933	72 years, 38 days
Fernando Jugo	May 14, 1891	June 3, 1956	65 years, 20 days
Santiago Kapunan	August 12, 1932	Alive	94 years, 101 days
Antonio Kho Jr.	June 29, 1966	Alive	60 years, 145 days
Alejo Labrador	July 17, 1894	March 15, 1967	72 years, 241 days
Fletcher Ladd	December 21, 1862	December 12, 1903	40 years, 356 days
José P. Laurel	March 9, 1891	November 6, 1959	68 years, 242 days
Amy Lazaro-Javier	November 16, 1956	Alive	70 years, 5 days
Marvic Leonen	December 29, 1962	Alive	63 years, 327 days
Jhosep Lopez	February 8, 1963	Alive	63 years, 286 days
Mario V. Lopez	June 4, 1955	Alive	71 years, 170 days
Querube Makalintal	December 22, 1910	November 8, 2002	91 years, 321 days
Felix Makasiar	July 15, 1915	February 19, 1992	76 years, 209 days
George A. Malcolm	November 5, 1881	May 16, 1961	79 years, 192 days
Victorino Mapa	February 25, 1855	April 12, 1927	72 years, 63 days
Midas Marquez	February 16, 1966	Alive	60 years, 278 days
Ruperto Martin	March 27, 1913	June 5, 1997	84 years, 70 days
Antonio Martinez	February 2, 1929	March 17, 2007	78 years, 43 days
Samuel Martires	January 2, 1949	Alive	77 years, 323 days
John T. McDonough	July 12, 1843	March 21, 1917	73 years, 252 days
Leo Medialdea	August 17, 1927	November 7, 1992	65 years, 82 days
Ameurfina Melencio-Herrera	May 11, 1922	October 12, 2020	98 years, 154 days
Jose Melo	May 30, 1932	October 19, 2020	88 years, 142 days
Jose C. Mendoza	August 13, 1947	Alive	79 years, 100 days
Vicente Mendoza	April 5, 1933	Alive	93 years, 230 days
Percy Moir	February 24, 1870	February 21, 1928	57 years, 362 days
Marcelino Montemayor	July 27, 1890	September 11, 1971	81 years, 46 days
Manuel V. Moran	October 27, 1893	August 23, 1961	68 years, 24 days
Sherman Moreland	October 16, 1868	December 27, 1951	83 years, 72 days
Cecilia Muñoz-Palma	November 22, 1913	January 2, 2006	92 years, 52 days
Antonio Nachura	June 13, 1941	March 13, 2022	80 years, 273 days
Andres Narvasa	November 30, 1928	October 31, 2013	84 years, 335 days
Felipe Natividad	September 20, 1891	September 19, 1965	73 years, 364 days
Rodolfo Nocon	March 15, 1928	May 12, 2000	72 years, 58 days
James A. Ostrand	January 20, 1871	April 15, 1937	66 years, 85 days
Roman Ozaeta	February 28, 1891	July 19, 1973	82 years, 141 days
Guillermo Pablo	June 25, 1886	August 2, 1982	96 years, 38 days
Sabino Padilla	August 21, 1894	June 15, 1986	91 years, 298 days
Teodoro Padilla	August 24, 1927	September 15, 1999	72 years, 22 days
Artemio Panganiban	December 7, 1936	Alive	89 years, 349 days
Edgardo Paras	July 4, 1922	September 3, 1994	72 years, 61 days
Ricardo Paras	February 17, 1891	October 10, 1984	93 years, 236 days
Jose Maria Paredes	August 15, 1895	October 15, 1977	82 years, 61 days
Bernardo P. Pardo	February 11, 1932	December 10, 2025	93 years, 302 days
Lino Patajo	September 23, 1916	April 11, 2010	93 years, 200 days
Diosdado Peralta	March 27, 1952	Alive	74 years, 239 days
Jose P. Perez	December 14, 1946	August 12, 2021	74 years, 241 days
Gregorio Perfecto	November 28, 1891	August 17, 1949	57 years, 262 days
Estela Perlas-Bernabe	May 14, 1952	Alive	74 years, 191 days
Flerida Ruth Pineda-Romero	August 1, 1929	December 8, 2017	88 years, 129 days
Efren Plana	June 28, 1928	December 19, 2012	84 years, 174 days
Reynato Puno	May 17, 1940	Alive	86 years, 188 days
Fidel Purisima	October 28, 1930	September 19, 2013	82 years, 326 days
Camilo Quiason	July 18, 1925	September 7, 2014	89 years, 51 days
Leonardo Quisumbing	November 6, 1939	January 20, 2019	79 years, 75 days
Claro M. Recto Jr.	February 8, 1890	October 2, 1960	70 years, 237 days
Roberto Regala	June 7, 1897	June 23, 1979	82 years, 16 days
Florenz Regalado	October 13, 1928	July 24, 2015	86 years, 284 days
Lorenzo Relova	January 20, 1916	April 23, 2014	98 years, 93 days
Alejandro Reyes	June 4, 1899	July 23, 1960	60 years, 2 days
Bienvenido Reyes	July 6, 1947	Alive	79 years, 138 days
J. B. L. Reyes	August 19, 1902	December 27, 1994	92 years, 130 days
Jose C. Reyes, Jr.	September 18, 1950	Alive	76 years, 64 days
Ruben Reyes	January 3, 1939	September 13, 2021	87 years, 322 days
Norberto Romualdez	June 6, 1875	November 4, 1941	66 years, 151 days
Ricardo Rosario	October 15, 1958	Alive	68 years, 37 days
Conrado Sanchez	February 19, 1900	August 22, 1983	83 years, 184 days
Angelina Sandoval-Gutierrez	February 28, 1938	Alive	88 years, 266 days
Guillermo Santos	January 23, 1915	May 4, 1991	76 years, 101 days
Abraham Sarmiento	October 8, 1921	October 3, 2010	88 years, 360 days
Maria Lourdes Sereno	July 2, 1960	Alive	66 years, 142 days
Maria Filomena Singh	June 25, 1966	Alive	60 years, 149 days
James Francis Smith	January 28, 1859	June 29, 1928	69 years, 153 days
Thomas Street	March 14, 1872	March 17, 1936	64 years, 3 days
Claudio Teehankee	April 18, 1918	November 27, 1989	71 years, 223 days
Noel Tijam	January 5, 1949	Alive	77 years, 320 days
Dante Tiñga	May 11, 1939	Alive	87 years, 194 days
Florentino Torres	October 16, 1844	April 29, 1927	82 years, 195 days
Justo Torres Jr.	November 1, 1927	December 26, 2017	90 years, 55 days
Luis Torres	April 8, 1880	January 9, 1959	78 years, 276 days
James F. Tracey	March 30, 1854	September 19, 1925	71 years, 173 days
Grant Trent	August 3, 1860	May 4, 1947	86 years, 274 days
Pedro Tuazon	September 15, 1884	June 28, 1961	76 years, 286 days
Conrado M. Vasquez	September 3, 1913	September 19, 2006	93 years, 16 days
Presbitero Velasco Jr.	August 8, 1948	Alive	78 years, 105 days
James C. Vickers	August 5, 1877	February 1945	67 years, 180 days
Ignacio Villamor	February 1, 1868	May 23, 1933	70 years, 111 days
Julio Villamor	April 12, 1902	June 15, 1988	86 years, 64 days
Raul Villanueva	April 15, 1963	Alive	63 years, 220 days
Martin Villarama Jr.	April 14, 1946	Alive	80 years, 221 days
Antonio Villareal	January 17, 1880	February 12, 1945	65 years, 26 days
Jose Lopez Vito	May 12, 1872	May 7, 1947	74 years, 360 days
Jose Vitug	July 15, 1934	Alive	92 years, 129 days
Charles A. Willard	May 21, 1857	March 13, 1914	57 years, 262 days
Pedro Yap	July 1, 1918	November 20, 2003	85 years, 142 days
Consuelo Ynares-Santiago	October 5, 1939	Alive	87 years, 47 days
José Yulo	September 24, 1894	October 27, 1976	82 years, 33 days
Calixto Zaldivar	September 13, 1904	October 13, 1979	75 years, 30 days
Rodil Zalameda	August 3, 1963	Alive	63 years, 110 days

=== By gender ===
Gender	Total	%
Male	178	90.82%
Female	18	9.18%
Total	196	100%

=== By appointing president ===
President	Total	Percent
Ferdinand Marcos (KBL/Nacionalista)	31	15.82%
Gloria Macapagal Arroyo (Lakas)	21	10.71%
Rodrigo Duterte (PDP–Laban)	20	9.18%
Corazon Aquino (UNIDO/Independent)	19	9.69%
Fidel Ramos (Lakas)	14	7.14%
Manuel L. Quezon (Nacionalista)	11	5.61%
Sergio Osmeña (Nacionalista)	9	4.59%
Joseph Estrada (LAMMP)	7	3.57%
William McKinley (Republican)	7	3.57%
Benigno Aquino III (Liberal)	6	3.06%
Elpidio Quirino (Liberal)	6	3.06%
Woodrow Wilson (Democratic)	1	0.51%
Warren G. Harding (Republican)	1	0.51%
Calvin Coolidge (Republican)	1	0.51%
Sergio Osmeña (Nacionalista)	1	0.51%
Japanese Military Administration	1	0.51%
Carlos P. Garcia (Nacionalista)	1	0.51%
Bongbong Marcos (PFP)	1	0.51%
Total	196	100%

== Court Membership Timelines ==
=== Members of the Arellano Court ===
Bar key:
Mckinley appointee T. Roosevelt appointee Taft appointee Wilson appointee

=== Membership timeline of the Mapa Court (1920–1921) ===
Bar key: T. Roosevelt appointee Wilson appointee Harding appointee

=== Membership timeline of the Araullo Court (1921–1924) ===
Bar key:
T. Roosevelt appointee Wilson appointee Harding appointee

=== Membership timeline of the Avanceña Court (1925–1941) ===
Bar Key:
T. Roosevelt appointee Wilson appointee Harding appointee Coolidge appointee Hoover appointee F. Rossevelt appointee Quezon appointee

=== Membership timeline of the Abad Santos court (1941–1942) ===
'Bar key':
Quezon appointee

=== Membership timeline of the Yulo Court (1942–1945) ===
Bar Key:
Quezon appointee Homma appointee Vargas appointee Laurel appointee Osmeña appointee

=== Membership timeline of the Makalintal court (1973–1975) ===
Bar key: Macapagal appointee Marcos appointee

=== Membership timeline of the Castro Court (1976–1979) ===
Bar key: Marcos appointee

=== Membership Timeline of the Fernando Court ===
Bar key: Marcos appointee

=== Membership timeline of the Makasiar court (1985) ===
Bar key: Marcos& appointee

=== Membership timeline of the Aquino Court (1985–1986) ===
Bar key: Marcos appointee

=== Membership timeline of the Teehankee Court (1986–1988) ===
Bar Key: Marcos appointee Aquino appointee

=== Membership timeline of the Yap Court (1988) ===
Bar Key: Marcos appointee Aquino appointee

=== Membership timeline of the Fernan Court (1988–1991) ===
Bar Key:
Marcos appointee Aquino appointee

=== Membership timeline of the Narvasa Court (1991–1998) ===
Bar key:
Marcos appointee Aquino appointee Ramos appointee Estrada appointee

=== Membership timeline of the Davide court (1998–2005) ===
Bar Key:
Aquino appointee Ramos appointee Estrada appointee Macapagal-Arroyo appointee

=== Membership timeline of the Panganiban Court (2005–2006) ===
Bar key:
Ramos appointee Estrada appointee Macapagal-Arroyo appointee

=== Membership timeline of the Puno Court (2006–2010) ===
'Bar key:
Ramos appointee Estrada appointee Macapagal-Arroyo appointee

== Membership Timeline ==
 Bar key:
Macapagal-Arroyo appointee B. Aquino III appointee

==== Membership Timeline of the Sereno Court (2012-2018) ====
Bar key: Macapagal-Arroyo appointee B. Aquino III appointee Duterte appointee

=== Membership timeline of the Leonardo-de Castro Court (2018) ===
Bar key:
Macapagal-Arroyo appointee B. Aquino III appointee Duterte appointee

=== Membership timeline of the Bersamin Court (2018–2019) ===
Bar key:
Macapagal-Arroyo appointee B. Aquino III appointee Duterte appointee

=== Membership timeline of the Peralta Court (2019–2021) ===
Bar key:
Macapagal-Arroyo appointee B. Aquino III appointee Duterte appointee

=== Membership timeline of the Gesmundo Court (2021 - 2026) ===
Bar key:
Macapagal-Arroyo appointee B. Aquino III appointee Duterte appointee Marcos Jr. appointee

== See also ==
- Supreme Court of the Philippines
- Chief Justice of the Supreme Court of the Philippines
- Associate Justice of the Supreme Court of the Philippines
- Court of Appeals of the Philippines
- Court of Tax Appeals of the Philippines
- Sandiganbayan
- Constitution of the Philippines
