= Oposa v. Factoran =

Landmark case in the Philippines

Oposa v. Factoran Minors Oposa
- Court: Supreme Court of the Philippines en banc
Full case name
Juan Antonio, Anna Rosario and Jose Alfonso, all surnamed Oposa, minors, and represented by their parents Antonio and Rizalina Oposa, Roberta Nicole Sadiua, minor, represented by her parents Calvin and Roberta Sadiua, Carlo, Amanda Salud and Patrisha, all surnamed Flores, minors and represented by their parents Enrico and Nida Flores, Gianina Dita R. Fortun, minor, represented by her parents Sigrid and Dolores Fortun, George II and Ma. Concepcion, all surnamed Misa, minors and represented by their parents George and Myra Misa, Benjamin Alan V. Pesigan, minor, represented by his parents Antonio and Alice Pesigan, Jovie Marie Alfaro, minor, represented by her parents Jose and Maria Violeta Alfaro, Maria Concepcion T. Castro, minor, represented by her parents Fredenil Castro and Jane Castro, Johanna Desamparado, minor, represented by her parents Jose and Angela Desamprado, Carlo Joaquin T. Narvasa, minor, represented by his parents Gregorio II and Cristine Charity Narvasa, Ma. Margarita, Jesus Ignacio, Ma. Angela and Marie Gabrielle, all surnamed Saenz, minors, represented by their parents Roberto and Aurora Saenz, Kristine, Mary Ellen, May, Golda Marthe and David Ian, all surnamed King, minors, represented by their parents Mario and Haydee King, David, Francisco and Therese Victoria, all surnamed Endriga, minors, represented by their parents Baltazar and Teresita Endriga, Jose Ma. and Regina Ma., all surnamed Abaya, minors, represented by their parents Antonio and Marica Abaya, Marilin, Mario Jr. and Mariette, all surnamed Cardama, minors, represented by their parents Mario and Lina Cardama, Clarissa, Ann Marie, Nagel, and Imee Lyn, all surnamed Oposa, minors and represented by their parents Ricardo and Marissa Oposa, Philip Joseph, Stephen John and Isaiah James, all surnamed Quipit, minors, represented by their parents Jose Max and Vilmi Quipit, Bughaw Cielo, Crisanto, Anna, Daniel and Francisco, all surnamed Bibal, minors, represented by their parents Francisco Jr. and Milagros Bibal, and the Philippine Ecological Network, Inc. v. The Hon. Fulgencio S. Factoran Jr., in his capacity as the Secretary of the Department of Environment and Natural Resources, and the Hon. Eriberto U. Rosario, Presiding Judge of the RTC, Makati, Branch 66
- Decided: July 30, 1993
- G.R. number: 101083
- Citation: 296 Phil. 694; 224 SCRA 792

Case history
- Appealed from: Makati Regional Trial Court Branch 66: Minors Oposa v. Factoran (Civil Case No. 90-77)
- Ponente: Hilario Davide, Jr.

Court membership
- Judges sitting: Andres Narvasa (Chief Justice), Hilario Davide Jr., Isagani Cruz, Teodoro Padilla, Abdulwahid Bidin, Carolina Griño-Aquino, Florenz Regalado, Flerida Ruth Pineda-Romero, Rodolfo A. Nocon, Josue Bellosillo, Jose Melo, Camilo Quiason, Florentino P. Feliciano, Reynato Puno, Jose C. Vitug
- Majority: Davide, Jr., joined by Cruz, Padilla, Bidin, Griño-Aquino, Regalado, Romero, Nocon, Bellosillo, Melo, Quiason
- Concurrence: Feliciano
- Narvasa, Puno, Vitug took no part in the consideration or decision of the case.

Oposa v. Factoran, 296 Phil. 694 (1993), alternatively titled Minors Oposa v. Factoran or Minors Oposa, is a landmark decision of the Supreme Court of the Philippines recognizing the doctrine of intergenerational responsibility on the environment in the Philippine legal system. The case is a contributor to the development of international environmental law.

== Background ==
In 1987, a new Philippine constitution was drafted during a period of growing concern over the preservation of the natural environment and resources of the Philippines. Section 16 of Article II of the 1987 Constitution provides the following state policy: "The State shall protect and advance the right of the people to a balanced and healthful ecology in accord with the rhythm and harmony of nature." On June 10, the Aquino administration created the Department of Environment and Natural Resources (DENR) under Executive Order 192.

Around that time, Antonio Oposa, fresh out of law school, formed the Philippine Ecological Network (PEN), one of the first environmental law organizations in the country. In March 1990, PEN, led and counseled by Oposa, filed a suit against DENR Secretary Fulgencio S. Factoran, Jr. on behalf of several minor petitioners, including Oposa's children and relatives. The suit sought to enjoin the DENR Secretary to cancel all existing timber license agreements in the country and to "cease and desist from receiving, accepting, processing, renewing or approving new timber license agreements." The complaint was instituted as a taxpayers' class suit with the petitioners attempting to represent "their generation as well as generations yet unborn." According to Oposa, the case should be called Oposa with Factoran because his friend Kuya Jun Factoran, a human rights lawyer, actually encouraged to sue the government using his name as the Secretary of the Department of Environment and Natural Resources, and to include the dozens of children as real-parties-in-interest, while it was the Solicitor-General and the rest of the government making it tougher for him, with Sec. Factoran already imposing new orders that discouraged illegal logging.

In their cause of action, the petitioners stated that the defendant Secretary had granted timber license agreements to various corporations thus cutting an aggregate area of 3.89 million hectares for commercial logging purposes. The petitioners argued that the act of the defendant Secretary constituted a "misappropriation of the natural property resources that he holds in trust for the benefit of the plaintiff minors and succeeding generations." In support of their claim, they invoked their right to a healthy environment under the Constitution, cited the enabling legislation of the DENR, and appealed to natural law. On June 22, 1990, the respondent Secretary filed a motion to dismiss on the grounds that the petitioners had no sufficient cause of action, and that the issue raised was political, not justiciable.

On July 18, 1991, without hearing oral arguments, the Regional Trial Court of Makati granted the motion to dismiss. While acknowledging "that the plaintiffs have the noblest intentions," the court sustained both of the defendant's claims while adding that the relief prayed for would violate the non-impairment of contract clause of the Constitution. The plaintiffs then filed an action for certiorari asking the Supreme Court to rescind and set aside the dismissal on the ground that the lower court judge gravely abused his discretion in dismissing the action.

== Decision ==
Justice Hilario Davide Jr. delivered the unanimous judgment, joined by ten other justices, while Justice Florentino Feliciano gave a separate concurring opinion. The Court granted the petition for certiorari and set aside the decision of the lower court dismissing the initial action. With regards to the cancellation of timber license agreements, however, the Court ordered that the various holders of the agreements be impleaded as indispensable parties to the motion.

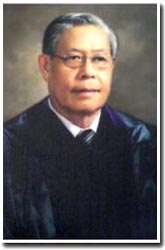
Justice Hilario Davide Jr., author of the ponente majority opinion

=== Doctrine of intergenerational responsibility ===
Despite the fact that the respondents did not take issue with the petitioners' legal standing, the Court nevertheless addressed the "special and novel element" of the petitioners representing "their generation and generations yet unborn." In the ponente, the Court spoke of the doctrine of intergenerational responsibility:

We find no difficulty in ruling that they can, for themselves, for others of their generation and for the succeeding generations, file a class suit. Their personality to sue in behalf of the succeeding generations can only be based on the concept of intergenerational responsibility insofar as the right to a balanced and healthful ecology is concerned. Such a right, as hereinafter expounded, considers the "rhythm and harmony of nature." Nature means the created world in its entirety. Such rhythm and harmony indispensably include, inter alia, the judicious disposition, utilization, management, renewal and conservation of the country's forest, mineral, land, waters, fisheries, wildlife, off-shore areas and other natural resources to the end that their exploration, development and utilization be equitably accessible to the present as well as future generations. Needless to say, every generation has a responsibility to the next to preserve that rhythm and harmony for the full enjoyment of a balanced and healthful ecology. Put a little differently, the minors' assertion of their right to a sound environment constitutes, at the same time, the performance of their obligation to ensure the protection of that right for the generations to come.

=== Right to a balanced and healthful ecology ===
On the merits of the petition, whether the petitioners had a cause of action, the Court recognized the constitutional right to a balanced and healthful ecology under Section 15 and 16 of Article II of the 1987 Constitution as self-executory and judicially enforceable in their present form. The Court interpreted the provisions, stating:

While the right to a balanced and healthful ecology is to be found under the Declaration of Principles and State Policies and not under the Bill of Rights, it does not follow that it is less important than any of the civil and political rights enumerated in the latter. Such a right belongs to a different category of rights altogether for it concerns nothing less than self-preservation and self-perpetuation — aptly and fittingly stressed by the petitioners — the advancement of which may even be said to predate all governments and constitutions. As a matter of fact, these basic rights need not even be written in the Constitution for they are assumed to exist from the inception of humankind. If they are now explicitly mentioned in the fundamental charter, it is because of the well-founded fear of its framers that unless the rights to a balanced and healthful ecology and to health are mandated as state policies by the Constitution itself, thereby highlighting their continuing importance and imposing upon the state a solemn obligation to preserve the first and protect and advance the second, the day would not be too far when all else would be lost not only for the present generation, but also for those to come — generations which stand to inherit nothing but parched earth incapable of sustaining life.

==== Justice Feliciano concurring opinion ====
In his concurring opinion, Justice Feliciano departs in part with the majority in that he found Sections 15 and 16 of Article II were not self-executing and judicially enforceable in their present form. Thus, although voting to grant the petition for certiorari "because the protection of the environment is of extreme importance of the country," he noted that the decision of the Court should be "subjected to closer examination." Justice Feliciano suggested that the decision of the Supreme Court should be understood as saying that "a more specific right may well exist in our corpus of law, considering the general policy principles of the Constitution" and that "the trial court should have given petitioners an effective opportunity so to demonstrate, instead of aborting the proceedings on a motion to dismiss." He suggests that the petitioners show a "more specific legal right" than the provisions of the Constitution to the trial court.

== Aftermath ==
The petitioners did not pursue a new case after the Supreme Court remanded the case back to the trial court.

After the decision, the Philippine government had inventoried the remnant old growth forests and restricted logging in those areas. The case is recognized in its contribution in the development of international environmental law.

== Legacy ==
In 2008, Antonio Oposa, a Filipino lawyer, was awarded by the Center for International Environmental Law for his contributions to the development and implementation of international environmental law in his native country and internationally.

=== International environmental law ===
The case has been used and cited in other national legal jurisdictions in litigation as well as policy formation.
