= John B. Sanborn Jr. =

American judge (1883–1964)

- Sanborn c. 1915

Senior Judge of the United States Court of Appeals for the Eighth Circuit
- In office June 30, 1959 – March 7, 1964

Judge of the United States Court of Appeals for the Eighth Circuit
- In office January 23, 1932 – June 30, 1959
- Appointed by: Herbert Hoover
- Preceded by: Wilbur F. Booth
- Succeeded by: Harry Blackmun

Judge of the United States District Court for the District of Minnesota
- In office March 18, 1925 – February 2, 1932
- Appointed by: Calvin Coolidge
- Preceded by: Wilbur F. Booth
- Succeeded by: Matthew M. Joyce

Personal details
- Born: John Benjamin Sanborn Jr. November 9, 1883 Saint Paul, Minnesota, US
- Died: March 7, 1964 (aged 80) Ramsey County, Minnesota, US
- Education: University of Minnesota (BA); Mitchell Hamline School of Law (LLB)

John Benjamin Sanborn Jr. (November 9, 1883 – March 7, 1964) was a United States circuit judge of the United States Court of Appeals for the Eighth Circuit and previously was a United States district judge of the United States District Court for the District of Minnesota.

== Education and career ==
Born on November 9, 1883, in Saint Paul, Minnesota, the son of prominent lawyer and Civil War general John B. Sanborn, Sanborn received a Bachelor of Arts degree in 1905 from the University of Minnesota and a Bachelor of Laws in 1907 from the St. Paul College of Law. (Note: now Mitchell Hamline School of Law) He entered private practice in Saint Paul from 1907 to 1916, a portion of that time with the firm owned by future United States Supreme Court Justice Pierce Butler and future United States Attorney General William D. Mitchell. He was a member of the Minnesota House of Representatives from 1913 to 1915. He was Comptroller of Insurance for the State of Minnesota from 1917 to 1918 and from 1919 to 1920.

On August 12, 1918, with the outbreak of World War I, he resigned as insurance commissioner and joined the United States Army, where he initially became a private. He was stationed at Fort Pike, Arkansas at the Infantry Central Officers Training School. He was commissioned as a first lieutenant on November 30, 1918, and was honorably discharged four days later on December 3. He was as a member of the Minnesota Tax Commission from 1920 to 1921, and a Judge of the Minnesota District Court from 1922 to 1925.

== Federal judicial service ==
Sanborn was nominated by President Calvin Coolidge on March 18, 1925, to a seat on the United States District Court for the District of Minnesota vacated by Judge Wilbur F. Booth. He was confirmed by the United States Senate on March 18, 1925, and received his commission the same day. His service terminated on February 2, 1932, due to his elevation to the Eighth Circuit.

Sanborn was nominated by President Herbert Hoover on December 19, 1931, to a seat on the United States Court of Appeals for the Eighth Circuit vacated by Judge Booth. He was confirmed by the Senate on January 19, 1932, and received his commission on January 23, 1932. He assumed senior status on June 30, 1959, by when he was the last federal judge in active service originally appointed to the bench by President Coolidge. (Note: When Judge Sanborn assumed senior status, two judges originally appointed by Woodrow Wilson to district courts (Joseph Chappell Hutcheson Jr., who assumed senior status in 1964, and Joseph William Woodrough, who assumed senior status in 1961) remained in active service as appeals judges. Two judges originally appointed by President Harding – Paul Jones and Charles C. Simons – also outlasted Sanborn in active service.) His service terminated on March 7, 1964, due to his death in Ramsey County, Minnesota.

== Role in law school merger ==
Sanborn also played an active role in the merger that officially created William Mitchell College of Law.

== Notes ==
Legal offices
| Preceded by Wilbur F. Booth | Judge of the United States District Court for the District of Minnesota; 1925–1932 | Succeeded by Matthew M. Joyce |
| Preceded by Wilbur F. Booth | Judge of the United States Court of Appeals for the Eighth Circuit; 1932–1959 | Succeeded by Harry Blackmun |
