= Wilbur F. Booth =

American judge (1861–1944)

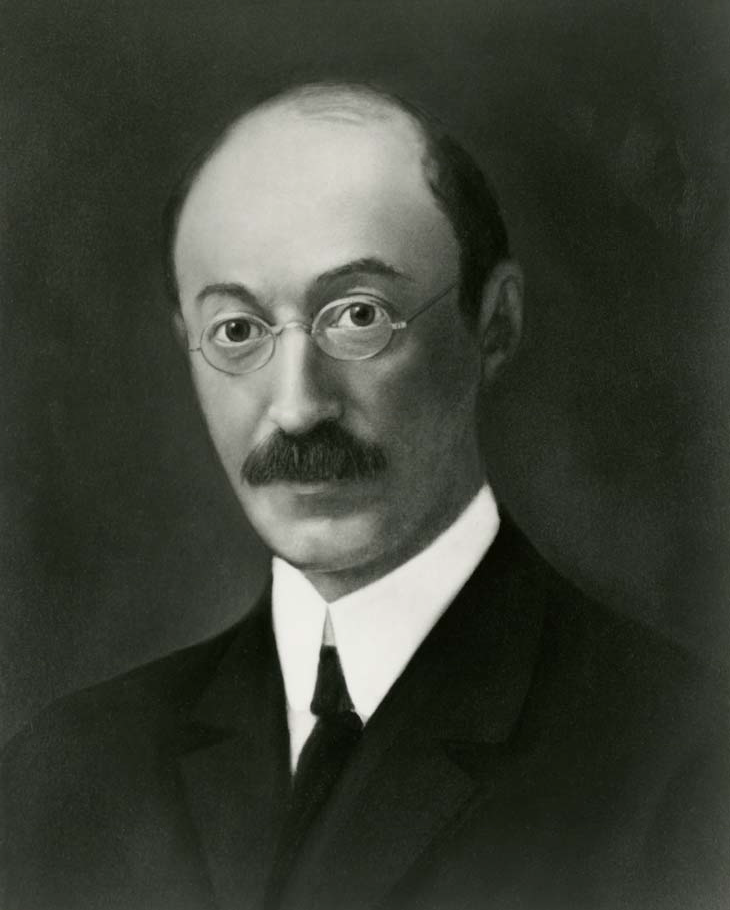

Senior Judge of the United States Court of Appeals for the Eighth Circuit
- In office January 1, 1932 – July 7, 1944

Judge of the United States Court of Appeals for the Eighth Circuit
- In office March 18, 1925 – January 1, 1932
- Appointed by: Calvin Coolidge
- Preceded by: Seat established by 43 Stat. 1116
- Succeeded by: John B. Sanborn Jr.

Judge of the United States District Court for the District of Minnesota
- In office May 4, 1914 – March 27, 1925
- Appointed by: Woodrow Wilson
- Preceded by: Charles Andrew Willard
- Succeeded by: John B. Sanborn Jr.

Personal details
- Born: Wilbur Franklin Booth; August 22, 1861 Seymour, Connecticut, U.S.
- Died: July 7, 1944 (aged 82) Minneapolis, Minnesota, U.S.
- Resting place: Bridgeport, Connecticut
- Education: Yale University (AB); Yale Law School (LLB)

Wilbur Franklin Booth (August 22, 1861 – July 7, 1944) was a United States circuit judge of the United States Court of Appeals for the Eighth Circuit and previously was a United States district judge of the United States District Court for the District of Minnesota.

== Education and career ==
Booth received an Artium Baccalaureus degree from Yale University in 1884, where he was a member of Skull and Bones, and a Bachelor of Laws from Yale Law School in 1888. He was in private practice in Saint Paul and Minneapolis, Minnesota from 1888 to 1890, and in Minneapolis alone until 1909. He was a district judge of Hennepin County, Minnesota from 1909 to 1914.

== Federal judicial service ==
Booth was nominated by President Woodrow Wilson on May 2, 1914, to a seat on the United States District Court for the District of Minnesota vacated by Judge Charles Andrew Willard. He was confirmed by the United States Senate on May 4, 1914, and received his commission the same day. He presided over the 1919 case of John Meintz who, as a German immigrant, had been seen to be disloyal to the United States and was tarred and feathered on August 19, 1918. Judge Booth, in charging the jury, said that the evidence was overwhelming in support of the contention that Meintz was disloyal and that there was a strong feeling against him in the community. His service terminated on March 27, 1925, due to his elevation to the Eighth Circuit.

Booth was nominated by President Calvin Coolidge on March 18, 1925, to the United States Court of Appeals for the Eighth Circuit, to a new seat authorized by 43 Stat. 1116. He was confirmed by the Senate on March 18, 1925, and received his commission the same day. He assumed senior status on January 1, 1932. His service terminated on July 7, 1944, due to his death of Parkinson's disease in Minneapolis. His ashes were interred in Bridgeport, Connecticut.

== Sources ==
Legal offices
Preceded by Charles Andrew Willard	Judge of the United States District Court for the District of Minnesota; 1914–1925	Succeeded by John B. Sanborn Jr.
Preceded by Seat established by 43 Stat. 1116	Judge of the United States Court of Appeals for the Eighth Circuit; 1925–1932	Succeeded by John B. Sanborn Jr.
