= Ramon Paul Hernando =

Filipino judge

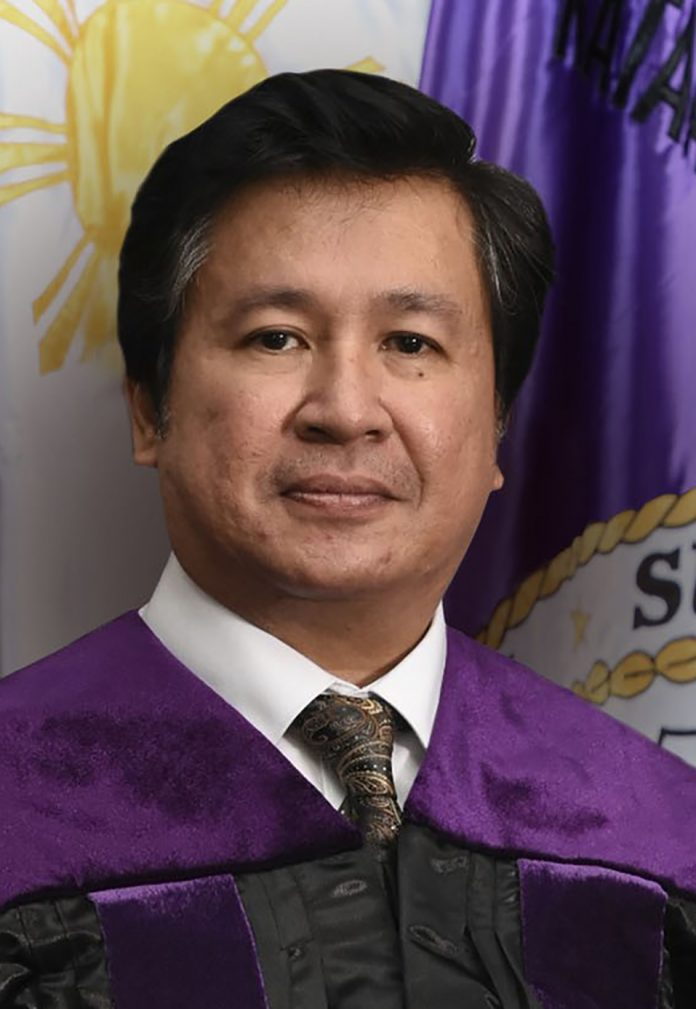
- Hernando in December 2022

Associate Justice of the Supreme Court of the Philippines
- Incumbent
- Assumed office October 10, 2018
- Appointed by: Rodrigo Duterte
- Preceded by: Samuel Martires

Justice of the Court of Appeals of the Philippines
- In office February 16, 2010 – October 10, 2018
- Appointed by: Gloria Macapagal Arroyo
- Preceded by: Myrna Dimaranan-Vidal
- Succeeded by: Bonifacio Pascua

Personal details
- Born: Ramon Paul Layugan Hernando; August 27, 1966 (age 60) Tuguegarao, Cagayan, Philippines
- Education: University of Santo Tomas (BA); San Beda College (LLB)

Ramon Paul Layugan Hernando (born August 27, 1966) is a Filipino judge who has served as an Associate Justice of the Supreme Court of the Philippines since 2019. He was appointed by President Rodrigo Duterte to succeed retiring justice Samuel Martires.

== Life and career ==
Hernando studied at Tuguegarao East Central School from 1972 to 1978; later graduating from St. Louis High School of Tuguegarao in 1982. He earned his Bachelor of Laws from the San Beda College of Law and was admitted to the bar in 1991. He later pursued post-graduate studies at the Ateneo de Manila University Graduate School of Business and San Beda Graduate School of Law.

He first worked as a member of the staff of late Associate Justice Florenz Regalado and later with the staff of retired associate justice Edgardo Paras in the years after his admission into the bar. He also worked as a Department of Justice prosecutor and was appointed San Pablo, Laguna Regional Trial Court judge in 2003. He was later appointed RTC judge in Quezon City in 2006 and was elevated to the appellate court in 2010. He has also taught at his alma mater San Beda and in San Sebastian College of Law and the Ateneo Law School.

== Associate Justice of the Supreme Court ==
Hernando originally applied for a vacancy created by the retirement of Associate Justice Jose C. Mendoza in 2017, but the seat ultimately went to Alexander Gesmundo. In October 2018 he was appointed by Rodrigo Duterte to replace Samuel Martires who was appointed ombudsman. He is Duterte's sixth appointment to the Supreme Court.

On August 6, 2019, Hernando penned the En Banc decision in Maynilad Water Services, Inc. and Manila Water Company, Inc. v. Secretary of the Environment and Natural Resources (G.R. Nos. 202897, 206823 & 207969, August 6, 2019), which penalized Metro Manila water concessionaires hundreds of millions of pesos for failing to comply with Section 8 of the Philippine Clean Water Act of 2004 (Republic Act No. 9275). Grounding his opinion on the Public Trust Doctrine, Hernando emphasized that water and sanitation are fundamental public trust resources rather than mere commercial assets, holding that private concessionaires cannot indefinitely defer their statutory duty to construct adequate sewerage and wastewater treatment facilities. The decision established strict corporate accountability under statutory environmental mandates, clarifying that private contractual agreements cannot override imperative ecological duties designed to protect public health and water systems like Manila Bay.

On July 27, 2021, Hernando authored the landmark En Banc decision in Pulido v. People (G.R. No. 220149, July 27, 2021), which modernized Philippine bigamy jurisprudence under Article 349 of the Revised Penal Code. Overturning decades of rigid precedent, the High Court held that an accused can validly raise the absolute nullity of a prior void marriage as a defense in a criminal bigamy prosecution, even without securing a prior judicial declaration of nullity beforehand. Hernando reasoned that when a prior marriage is void ab initio, an essential element of bigamy, which is a valid subsisting prior marriage, is absent, thus removing criminal liability. The ruling established a pragmatic, social justice oriented approach to family law by ensuring individuals are not unjustly incarcerated for technical bigamy when their original marriage was non-existent under the law.

On April 16, 2024, Hernando penned the decision in XXX v. People of the Philippines (G.R. No. 252739, April 16, 2024), expanding protections for spouses under Republic Act No. 9262 (the Anti-Violence Against Women and Their Children Act of 2004). The Court affirmed that marital infidelity and spousal abandonment directly constitute actionable psychological violence under Section 5(i) of the law. Hernando held that for acts of marital infidelity, the specific criminal intent to cause mental or emotional anguish is presumed from the commission of the act itself, stressing that RA 9262 measures liability based on the victim's psychological injury rather than the perpetrator's subjective motive.

On December 3, 2025, Hernando penned the En Banc ruling in Pimentel III et al. v. House of Representatives et al. (G.R. Nos. 274778, 275405 & 276233, December 3, 2025), striking down an executive attempt by the Department of Finance to sweep ₱89.9 billion in reserve funds from the Philippine Health Insurance Corporation (PhilHealth) back into the National Treasury. Writing for the majority, Hernando held that special funds collected and earmarked for healthcare implementation under the Universal Health Care Act cannot be siphoned off via administrative circulars to cover general national budget deficits. The decision enforced strict fiscal autonomy and trust fund boundaries under Article VI, Section 29(3) of the Constitution, ordering the full restoration of the diverted funds to PhilHealth.

On August 26, 2026, Hernando authored the En Banc decision in Kapatiran Party et al. v. Congress of the Philippines (G.R. No. 263934 et al., August 26, 2026), which unanimously held that Congress committed grave abuse of discretion in its 39-year failure to pass anti-dynasty legislation. Addressing the decades-long legislative inaction since the ratification of the 1987 Constitution, Hernando declared that Article II, Section 26 creates a mandatory constitutional duty for Congress to pass an enabling law defining and prohibiting political dynasties.

Legal offices
Preceded by Samuel Martires	Associate Justice of the Supreme Court; 2018–present	Incumbent
