= Ricardo Rosario =

Filipino judge

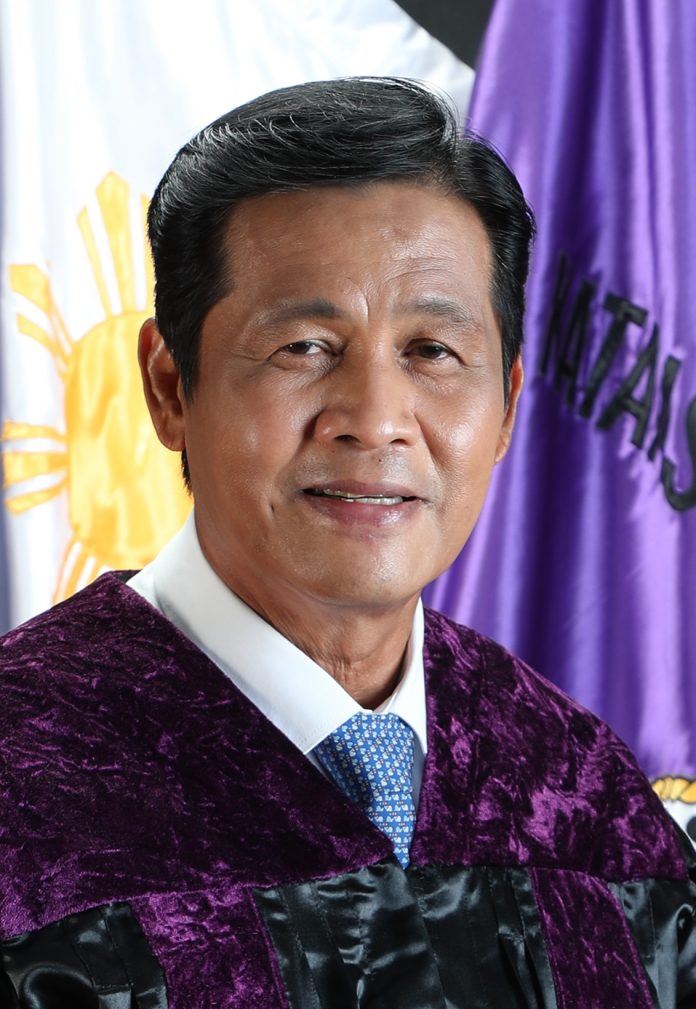
- Rosario in December 2022

Associate Justice of the Supreme Court of the Philippines
- Incumbent
- Assumed office October 8, 2020
- Appointed by: Rodrigo Duterte
- Preceded by: Jose Reyes Jr.

Associate Justice of the Court of Appeals of the Philippines
- In office September 12, 2005 – October 8, 2020
- Appointed by: Gloria Macapagal Arroyo
- Preceded by: Perlita Tria-Tirona
- Succeeded by: Jaime Fortunato Caringal

Personal details
- Born: Ricardo de Rivera Rosario; October 15, 1958 (age 68) Quezon City, Philippines
- Parent(s): Eduardo Gutierrez; Rosario Anita de Rivera Rosario

Ricardo de Rivera Rosario (born October 15, 1958) is a Filipino judge who has served as an associate justice of the Supreme Court of the Philippines since 2020. He was appointed by President Rodrigo Duterte to replace Associate Justice Jose Reyes Jr.

== Early life and education ==
Rosario was born to Eduardo Gutierrez Rosario of Pangasinan and Anita Alvarez De Rivera of Aparri, Cagayan. He is the fourth of thirteen siblings.

He obtained his pre-law degree in political science from the Far Eastern University in 1979, and his Bachelor of Laws degree from the Ateneo de Manila University in 1983. He is a member of the Aquila Legis fraternity.

== Career ==
He started his career in law as a legal officer of the National Bureau of Investigation, and thereafter as senior corporate attorney in the Metropolitan Waterworks and Sewerage System.

=== Trial court judge ===
Rosario was appointed senior assistant city prosecutor in Quezon City in 1994, where he served for three years. Rosario became the presiding judge of Manila Metropolitan Trial Court Branch 19 in 1997, then later as presiding judge of the Makati Regional Trial Court Branch 66 until he was promoted to the Court of Appeals in September 2005.

=== Appellate court ===
On September 12, 2005, President Gloria Macapagal Arroyo appointed Rosario as an associate justice of the Court of Appeals. Rosario was Chairman of The Court of Appeals' Ninth Division. He held the position for 15 years until his appointment to the Supreme Court in 2020.

== Associate justice of the Supreme Court ==
On October 8, 2020, President Rodrigo Duterte appointed Rosario as an associate justice of the Supreme Court. Rosario filled the post vacated by Supreme Court Associate Justice Jose Reyes Jr., who had retired that September. He was chosen out of six other potential candidates, Court of Appeals (CA) Associate Justices Ramon Cruz, Japar Dimaampao, Jhosep Lopez, Eduardo Peralta Jr., and María Filomena Singh, as well as Court Administrator Midas Marquez.

== Personal life ==
Rosario is married to Maridur Virtucio-Rosario, deputy commissioner for operations of the Bureau of Internal Revenue since October 2023. They have three children.

Legal offices
Preceded by Jose Reyes Jr.	Associate Justice of the Supreme Court of the Philippines; 2020–present	Incumbent
