= Edgardo Delos Santos =

Associate Justice of the Supreme Court of the Philippines

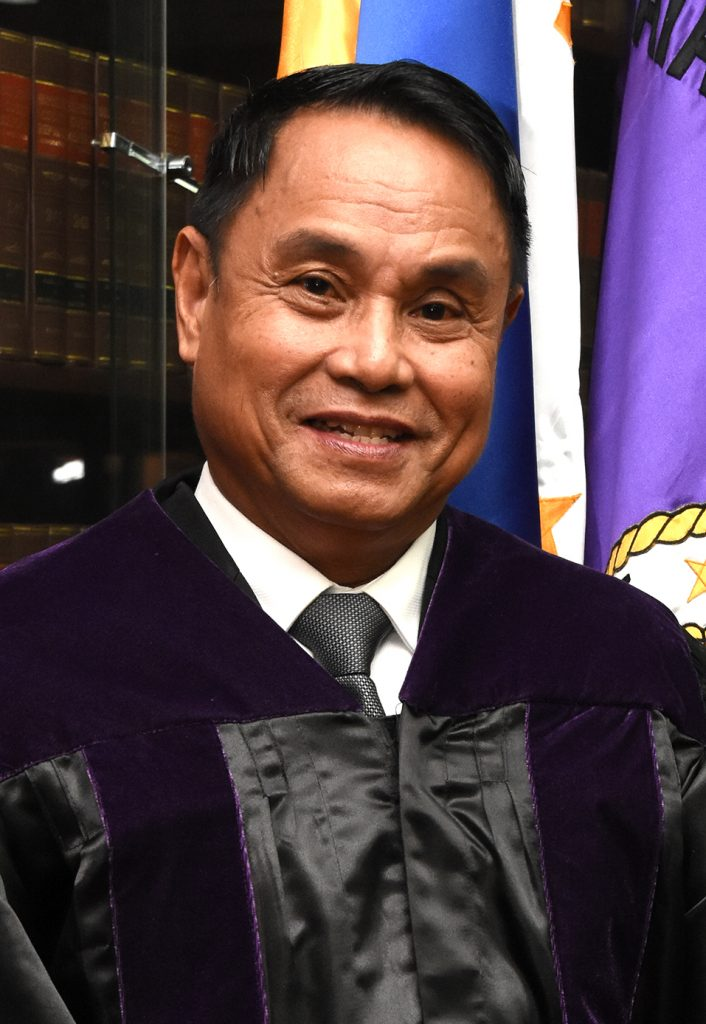

186th Associate Justice of the Supreme Court of the Philippines
- In office December 3, 2019 – June 30, 2021
- Appointed by: Rodrigo Duterte
- Preceded by: Antonio Carpio
- Succeeded by: Midas Marquez

Personal details
- Born: Edgardo Lao Delos Santos; June 12, 1952 (age 73) Palompon, Leyte, Philippines
- Education: University of San Carlos (AB, LLB)

Edgardo "Edgar" Lao Delos Santos (born June 12, 1952) is a former Associate Justice of the Supreme Court of the Philippines. He was appointed by President Rodrigo Duterte to replace Justice Antonio Carpio.

== Education ==
Delos Santos obtained his law degree from the University of San Carlos in Cebu.

== Legal and judicial career ==
He initially served as a municipal trial court judge in Dumaguete and later became regional trial court judge in Bacolod before his appointment to the appellate court. He was a Cebu-based Court of Appeals Justice for more than 11 years.

=== Supreme Court appointment ===
Delos Santos had first interviewed for the seat vacated by Noel Tijam but he was not shortlisted. He was then interviewed for the seat vacated by Mariano del Castillo which was later filled by Rodil Zalameda. On December 3, 2019, Delos Santos was appointed to the court to fill the seat vacated by Antonio Carpio. Delos Santos retired on June 30, 2021, a year earlier than expected, for health reasons.

== Personal ==
Delos Santos was born in Palompon, Leyte on June 12, 1952.

Legal offices
Preceded by Antonio Carpio	Associate Justice of the Supreme Court; 2019–2021	Succeeded by Midas Marquez
