= Adam Clarke Carson =

American lawyer and Supreme Court associate justice

The Honourable Adam Clarke Carson
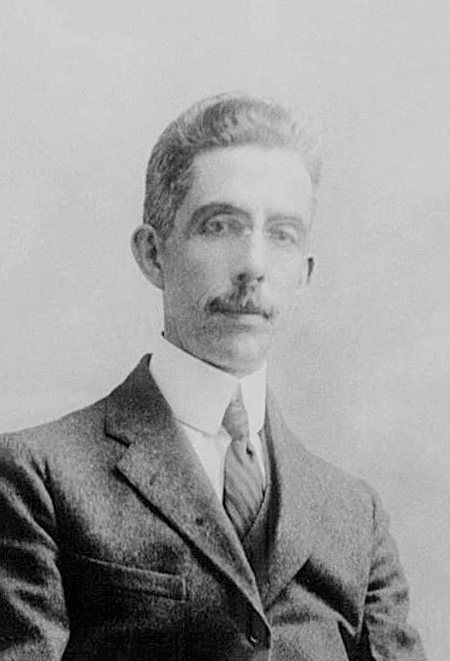
- Carson in 1922

10th Associate Justice of the Supreme Court of the Philippines
- In office 16 November 1904 – 30 November 1920
- Appointed by: Theodore Roosevelt
- Preceded by: Charles Andrew Willard
- Succeeded by: Charles A. Johns

Member of Chickasaw Council
- In office 1897

Judge of Court of First Instance
- In office 1901–1904

Personal details
- Born: Adam Clarke Carson; 14 January 1869 Enniskillen, Ireland
- Died: 23 May 1941 (aged 72)
- Resting place: Prospect Hill Cemetery, Front Loyal, Virginia
- Spouse: Eleanor Barnard Conrad (m. 1908)
- Children: 2
- Education: University of Virginia
- Occupation: Soldier; politician; judge
- Profession: Lawyer

Military service
- Allegiance: United States; Philippines
- Years of service: 1898–1899, 1899–1901
- Unit: Infantry
- Commands: 28th Volunteers, Infantry (Philippines); 4th Infantry Regiment (United States)
- Battles/wars: Army of Occupation (Mexico)

Adam Clarke Carson (14 January 1869 – 23 May 1941) was an American soldier and lawyer, served as 10th Associate justice of the Supreme Court of the Philippines from 16 November 1904 to 30 November 1920.

In 1898, Carson was appointed to United States 4th volunteer Infantry as a Captain from Virginia. Carson also served in Spanish-American War before joining their family business and opened a law office in New York.
