= Universal Health Care Act (Philippines) =

2019 Philippine health reform law

17th Congress of the Philippines
- Long title: An Act Instituting Universal Health Care for All Filipinos, Prescribing Reforms in the Health Care System, and Appropriating Funds Therefor
- Citation: Republic Act No. 11223
- Territorial extent: Philippines
- Passed by: House of Representatives of the Philippines
- Passed: December 10, 2018
- Passed by: Senate of the Philippines
- Passed: December 10, 2018
- Signed by: Rodrigo Duterte
- Signed: February 20, 2019
- Administered by: Department of Health and Philippine Health Insurance Corporation

Legislative history

Initiating chamber: House of Representatives of the Philippines
- Bill title: House Bill No. 5784

Revising chamber: Senate of the Philippines
- Bill title: Senate Bill No. 1896
- Status: Current legislation

The Universal Health Care Act, officially designated as Republic Act No. 11223, is a Philippine law that instituted major reforms in the country's health-care system. It automatically includes every Filipino citizen in the National Health Insurance Program (NHIP) administered by the Philippine Health Insurance Corporation (PhilHealth) and provides immediate eligibility for health benefits.

The law also provides for the integration of local health systems, the organization of public and private providers into health-care provider networks, expanded primary and outpatient care, reforms in health financing and provider payment, health workforce development, health technology assessment, and interoperable health information systems. President Rodrigo Duterte signed the measure into law on February 20, 2019.

== Background ==
The National Health Insurance Act of 1995 established PhilHealth and provided for the progressive expansion of national health-insurance coverage. Despite subsequent health-sector reforms, the Philippine health system remained divided among the Department of Health (DOH), local government units, PhilHealth, and private providers. A 2018 health-system review identified continuing fragmentation in governance and financing, unequal access to health services, and substantial reliance on direct household payments.

Before the enactment of Republic Act No. 11223, PhilHealth reported coverage of approximately 92 percent of the population, but a significant number of members were either unaware of their benefits or unable to use them. Out-of-pocket payments accounted for 53.9 percent of current health expenditure in 2018. The World Health Organization (WHO) described the legislation as the culmination of several decades of Philippine health-sector reform and participated as a technical adviser during Senate consultations and public hearings on the proposed law.

== Legislative history ==
House Bill No. 5784, principally authored by representative Angelina Tan, was approved on third reading by the House of Representatives on September 6, 2017. It was transmitted to the Senate the following day.

The Senate considered its own version, Senate Bill No. 1896. Senator JV Ejercito, then chair of the Senate Committee on Health and Demography, served as its principal sponsor. The Senate approved the bill on third reading by a vote of 14–0 on October 10, 2018.

A bicameral conference committee reconciled the House and Senate versions. Both chambers ratified the conference committee report on December 10, 2018. The consolidated bill was sent to the Office of the President on January 23, 2019, and Duterte signed it on February 20.

== Provisions ==
=== Population and service coverage ===
The act automatically includes all Filipino citizens in the NHIP. Membership is divided into two categories: direct contributors, who are capable of paying premiums, and indirect contributors, whose premiums are subsidized by the national government.

All citizens are granted immediate eligibility for preventive, promotive, curative, rehabilitative, palliative, dental, mental-health, and emergency services. Presentation of a PhilHealth identification card is not required to receive covered services, and failure by a direct contributor to pay premiums does not prevent the use of program benefits. Missed contributions, however, remain collectible from employers and self-employed contributors.

The law prohibits co-payments for services provided under basic or ward accommodation. Co-payments and co-insurance for additional amenities in public hospitals are subject to regulation by the DOH and PhilHealth. It also requires PhilHealth to develop a comprehensive outpatient benefit covering, among other services, outpatient medicines and emergency care.

=== Health financing ===
Population-based services, such as health promotion, epidemiological surveillance, and disease-control programs, are financed principally by the national government through the DOH and are to be provided without charge at the point of service. Individual-based services, including inpatient and outpatient treatment, medicines, diagnostic procedures, and laboratory examinations, are financed primarily through prepayment arrangements such as social health insurance, private insurance, and health-maintenance organization plans.

The act established a schedule that progressively increased PhilHealth premium contributions for direct contributors from 2.75 percent in 2019 to 5 percent beginning in 2024. Premium subsidies for indirect contributors are appropriated annually through the General Appropriations Act. The law provides that increases in contributions or government subsidies should be accompanied by corresponding increases in benefits.

Funding for implementation is derived from several sources, including:

- incremental collections under the Sin Tax Reform Act of 2012;
- 50 percent of the national government's share of income from the Philippine Amusement and Gaming Corporation;
- 40 percent of the charity fund of the Philippine Charity Sweepstakes Office, after specified deductions;
- PhilHealth members' premium contributions;
- annual DOH appropriations; and
- national government subsidies to PhilHealth.

=== Local health systems and provider networks ===
The act directs the DOH, the Department of the Interior and Local Government, PhilHealth, and local government units to integrate local health services into province-wide and city-wide health systems. Provincial and city health boards oversee these integrated systems and exercise administrative and technical supervision over participating facilities and health personnel.

Each integrated system is required to maintain a Special Health Fund that pools resources for population-based and individual-based services, operating expenses, capital investments, additional health workers, and employee incentives. Income earned by local facilities from PhilHealth payments accrues to this fund and must be used for improving the local health system.

PhilHealth is directed to contract public, private, or mixed health-care provider networks for individual-based services. Primary-care providers are intended to serve as patients' first point of contact and as coordinators of referrals within these networks. The act also directs PhilHealth to move toward prospective, performance-based payments rather than relying solely on payments for individual services.

=== Health workforce ===
The DOH is required to formulate a National Health Human Resource Master Plan covering the education, recruitment, deployment, retention, regulation, and distribution of health workers. A national health-workforce support system is intended to supplement staffing in local health systems, with priority given to geographically isolated and disadvantaged areas.

Recipients of government-funded scholarships in health and allied-health courses must render at least three years of compensated public service in a priority area. The law also directs education and professional-regulation agencies to reorient health-professional education toward primary-care competencies.

=== Regulation, information, and accountability ===
The act institutionalized health technology assessment as a process for determining which medicines, medical devices, procedures, and benefit packages may be publicly financed. It created a Health Technology Assessment Council, initially under the DOH and subsequently intended to become an entity attached to the Department of Science and Technology.

Government hospitals are generally required to allocate at least 90 percent of their bed capacity to basic or ward accommodation, while government specialty hospitals must allocate at least 70 percent. Private hospitals are required to allocate at least 10 percent of their capacity to basic or ward accommodation.

Health-care providers and insurers are required to maintain interoperable information systems that include electronic health records, human-resource information, electronic prescription logs, and administrative data. The act requires public and private health-related entities to submit specified data to PhilHealth for policy-making and research, subject to the Data Privacy Act of 2012.

The law also established a Health Promotion Bureau within the DOH and required spending for health-promotion programs to reach at least one percent of the department's total budget within two years of the act's effectivity.

== Implementation ==
Health Secretary Francisco Duque III signed the implementing rules and regulations of the act on October 10, 2019. The government initially planned a progressive rollout using 33 implementation or “integration” sites. At the signing of the regulations, the DOH estimated that implementation would require ₱257 billion during its first year and approximately ₱1.5 trillion through 2024.

Implementation scheduled for January 2020 was disrupted by the COVID-19 pandemic. A 2022 content analysis of the act found that the pandemic exposed weaknesses involving the health workforce, financing, health-information systems, coordination with local governments, and engagement with private providers and community organizations.

A 2024 assessment reported progress in establishing PhilHealth as a strategic purchaser of health services, expanding primary-care benefits, and testing Special Health Fund arrangements. It nevertheless identified continuing challenges involving sustainable financing, effective coverage of low-income households, integration of private providers, and the administrative and financial capacity of local health systems.

A qualitative study published in 2025 identified health-workforce barriers such as restrictive hiring policies, limits on local-government personnel spending, inadequate preparation of health graduates for UHC implementation, poor working conditions, uncompetitive salaries, insecure employment, and migration of health professionals. The researchers recommended closer coordination between educational institutions and health facilities, scholarship and return-service programs, civil-service reforms, and stronger measures for retaining health workers.

== Reception ==
The WHO welcomed the law's enactment as an important step toward reducing financial barriers to health care. It noted that household out-of-pocket payments accounted for approximately 54 percent of Philippine health expenditure in 2016 and stated that effective implementation of the act could reduce catastrophic health expenditure and health-related impoverishment.

Policy analyses have generally described the law as a broad structural reform rather than solely an expansion of insurance membership. Its effectiveness, however, depends on the availability of health facilities and personnel, sustainable public financing, effective purchasing by PhilHealth, and the capacity of local governments to integrate services and pool their resources.

== See also ==
- Health care in the Philippines
- Philippine Health Insurance Corporation
- Department of Health (Philippines)
- National Health Insurance Act of 1995
- Sin Tax Reform Act of 2012
- Universal health care by country
