= Elias Finley Johnson =

American politician and judge (1861–1933)

The Honourable Elias Finley Johnson
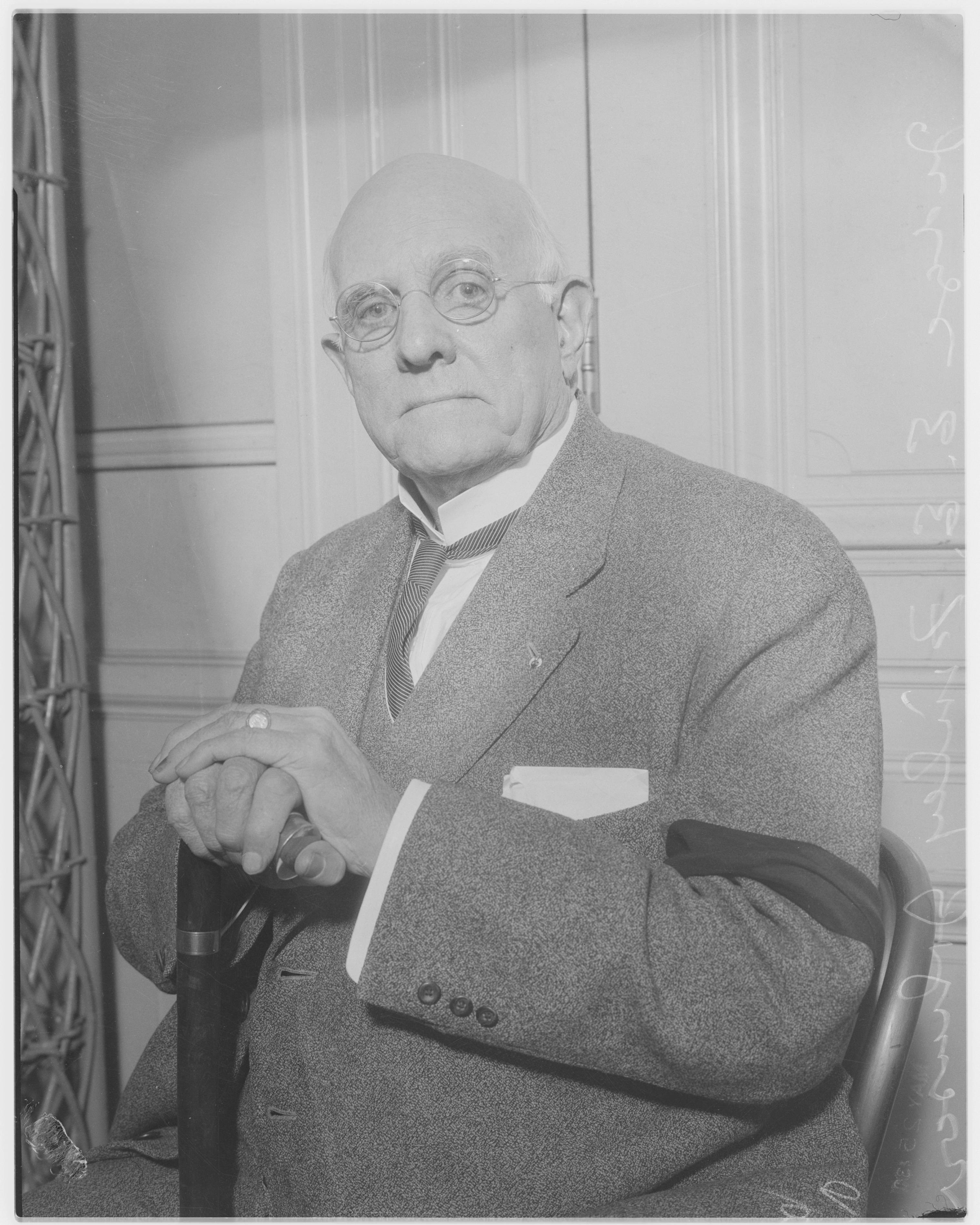
- Johnson in 1930

9th Associate Justice of the Supreme Court of the Philippines
- In office October 3, 1903 – April 1, 1933
- Appointed by: Theodore Roosevelt
- Preceded by: Fletcher Ladd
- Succeeded by: James C. Vickers

Member, Board of Regents of the University of Michigan

Member of the Ohio House of Representatives
- In office 1883–1887

Judge, Court of First Instance of Pangasinan
- In office 1901–?

Personal details
- Born: Elias Finley Johnson; 24 June 1861 Van Wert, Ohio, U.S.
- Died: 1 August 1933 (aged 72) Colma, California, U.S.
- Resting place: Olivet Gardens of Cypress Lawn Memorial Park (his ashes and his wife's are stored at the columbarium of the cemetery)
- Other political affiliations: Republican
- Spouse: Clara Annis Smith (m. 1883)
- Relations: William H. West (uncle); William Wartenbee Johnson (uncle)
- Children: 2
- Parent(s): Abel Johnson, Margaret Gillespie
- Education: National Normal University; University of Michigan
- Alma mater: Ohio State University (did not graduate)
- Occupation: Professor; politician; surveyor; author
- Profession: Judge; lawyer

Elias Finley Johnson (24 June 1861 – 1 August 1933) was an American politician, professor, surveyor, author, jurist, statesman, lawyer and judge. He served as Associate Justice of the Supreme Court of the Philippines from October 3, 1903, until his resignation on April 1, 1933. Johnson also served as a member of the Ohio House of Representatives from 1883 to 1887. He was an author of the Johnson on Bills and Notes and Elements of law of Negotiable Contracts. He was the longest-serving Associate Justice of the Supreme Court of the Philippines; he served for 29 years and 52 days.

== Biography ==
Johnson was born on June 24, 1861, at Van Wert, Ohio. His parents were Judge Abel Johnson, judge of the Court of Common Pleas in Ohio, and Margaret (née Gillespie) Johnson. His father was of Welsh descent and his mother was of English descent. His uncle from his father's side was the Chief justice in the Supreme Court of Ohio, and his uncle on his mother's side, Judge William H. West was also a member in the Supreme Court of Ohio His family came from Eastern Pennsylvania and settled in Ohio. His grandfather was the first treasurer of Van Wert County, Ohio, and his uncle, Davis Johnson, was also county treasurer of Van Wert County.

His father died when he was only four years old.

When he graduated high school in 1876, he started teaching to make enough money for his family. He was able to enter senior class in 1880.

He attended the Ohio State University but did not complete the course. At the age of 19 he received a Bachelor of Science degree from Normal University of Ohio. He attended law school of the University of Michigan in 1888, and graduated Bachelor of Laws in 1890 and Master of Laws in 1891.

At the age of 22, he became a member of the Ohio House of Representatives, serving from 1883 to 1887. Johnson became an assistant professor and instructor from 1891 to 1897 at the University of Michigan. He became a member of the Board of Regents of the University of Michigan He served from 1898 until resigning in 1901 to become an associate justice of the Supreme Court of the Philippines.

Johnson together with his colleague and former associate justice George A. Malcolm was greatly influenced by judge Thomas M. Cooley, which also helped to establish the Constitution Law curriculum. Johnson studied law with Colonel I.N. Alexander, District Attorney for Northern Ohio.

== Career ==
Johnson was elected School Superintendent of Schools in Van Wert in 1880. In 1882 he was appointed as county surveyor for Van Wert. He moved to Michigan in 1888 and became instructor and professor in the department of law at Michigan State University until his graduation in June 1890. In the spring of 1898, Governor John T. Rich appointed him to became a member of the State Board of Education of Michigan to fill out the vacancy. In 1891 he was a regular instructor of the university, until 1892, when he became secretary of law faculty. In 1896 he was elected as professor of law by the Board of Regents of Michigan University, and he was given the title "Professor of Law and Secretary of the faculty of the Department of Law.

In February 1901, President William McKinley appointed Johnson a judge of the Court of First Instance (currently known as Regional Trial Court) in Pangasinan. Johnson also become a professor of law at the University of the Philippines, and a member of the Board of Regents at the same school. In 1881, he was appointed as School Superintendent of Schools for Van Wert County, but he resigned in 1883 to accept his nomination for the Republican ticket for representative for Van Wert.

=== As associate justice ===
In 1901 President Theodore Roosevelt appointed Johnson as associate justice of the Supreme Court of the Philippines, replacing associate justice John T. McDonough. Johnson resigned as a member of the Board of Regents of the University of Michigan to accept this promotion.

It was argued that his decisions as Associate Justice religiously cited the works of Thomas M. Cooley.

== Political life ==
Johnson was active in his political life. He became the youngest member of the legislature, at the age of 22. He became a member of the Ohio House of Representatives (1883–1887) and a member of every state convention in Ohio from 1882 to 1888. He was the first Republican representative from the Van Wert County. Despite it being a Democratic county, he was elected in by a large majority. Johnson was always a Republican. In 1898 the Republican ticket nominated him for member for the Michigan State Board of Education. He received more votes than any candidate except for Governor Hazen S. Pingree.

== Personal life ==
In 1884, Johnson married an Van Wert native Clara Annis Smith, They had two children, Eva and Cecil.

Johnson was a member of the Knights of Pythias and Knights Templar and Shrine.

He resigned from his position as associate justice four months before his death. He died of stroke on August 1, 1933, in Colma, California at the age of 72.
