= Jose Reyes Jr. =

Filipino judge (born 1950)

The Honorable Jose Reyes Jr.
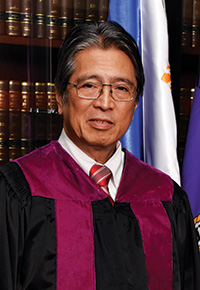

179th Associate Justice of the Supreme Court of the Philippines
- In office August 10, 2018 – September 18, 2020
- Appointed by: Rodrigo Duterte
- Preceded by: Presbitero Velasco Jr.
- Succeeded by: Ricardo Rosario

Personal details
- Born: Jose Calayag Reyes Jr. September 18, 1950 (age 76)
- Education: San Beda College (AB, LLB)

Jose Calayag Reyes Jr. (born September 18, 1950) is a former associate justice of the Supreme Court of the Philippines. Previously, he was a trial court for 16 years, then served on the Philippine Court of Appeals for 15 years.

He was also a state deputy in the Knights of Columbus and was elected to the Order's Supreme Board of Directors in 2016. With his wife, Maria, he has three children.

Legal offices
Preceded by Presbitero Velasco Jr.	Associate Justice of the Supreme Court; 2018–2020	Succeeded by Ricardo Rosario
