= Emilio Gancayco =

Filipino lawyer (1921–2009)

Emilio Angeles Gancayco

Associate Justice of the Supreme Court of the Philippines
- In office January 12, 1987 – August 22, 1997

Personal details
- Born: August 20, 1921
- Died: July 28, 2009 (aged 87)
- Education: University of the Philippines College of Law

Emilio Angeles Gancayco (August 20, 1921 – July 28, 2009) was a Filipino lawyer who served as Associate Justice of the Supreme Court of the Philippines from January 12, 1987 to August 22, 1997. He was appointed by President Corazon Aquino.

== Personal life ==
Emilio Gancayco was born in Orion, Bataan to Braulio Malimban Gancayco and Emilia Lim Angeles.

He finished his secondary education from Jose Rizal Institute, High School with highest honors. He then graduated from the University of the Philippines College of Law in 1947, but not after his law studies were interrupted by World War II when he became part of the guerrilla movement in his hometown against the Japanese occupying forces. He is a member of Upsilon Sigma Phi.

On June 29, 1946, he married Herminia Melia. They raised 5 children.

== Career ==
He started his judicial career as a State Prosecutor then rose up the ranks and was appointed as a Chief State Prosecutor in the Department of Justice, an Associate Justice then a Presiding Justice of the Court of Appeals until finally becoming an Associate Justice of the Supreme Court from 1987 to 1991.

He was also appointed Chairman of the Presidential Fact-Finding and Policy Advisory Commission for the Protection of Overseas Filipinos in 1995 (also known as the Gancayco Commission), a Vice Chairman for Philtrust Bank, a Former President and Director of the YMCA of the Philippines.

He regularly chaired committees formed to craft or revise the rules of court and laws or rules specially related to the Judiciary.

On January 12, 1987, President Aquino appointed him Associate Justice of the Supreme Court. He was assigned to sit in the House of Representatives Electoral Tribunal. He was also designated Chairman of the 1990 Bar Examinations.

== Awards ==
He was awarded with the Papal Award as Knight of St. Gregory the Great, the Leadership and Achievement Award, the Gold Medal of Honor, the Silver Jubilee Award of Merit (Catholic Action of the Philippines) in 1975, the Special Prosecutor of the Year in 1960 by the Justice and Court Reporters Association of the Philippines.
