= James Ostrand =

Norwegian-American soldier and lawyer (1871–1937)

James Adolph Ostrand
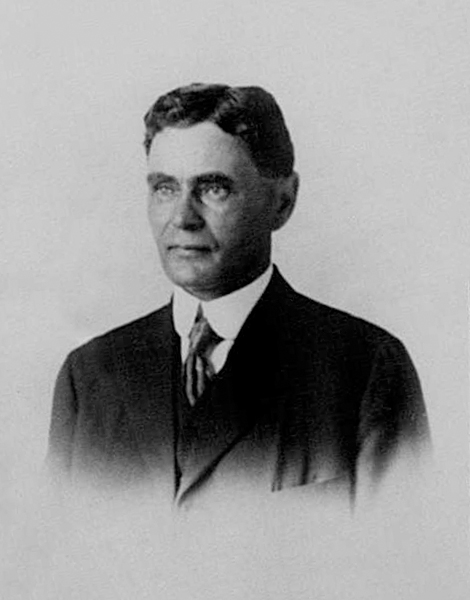
- Passport application, 1920

22nd Associate Justice of the Supreme Court of the Philippines
- In office 27 September 1921 – 30 June 1933
- Appointed by: Warren G. Harding
- Preceded by: Percy M. Moir
- Succeeded by: George C. Butte

Judge of Court of First Instance of Manila
- In office 1914

Judge of Land Registration Authority (Philippines)
- In office 1909–1913

Personal details
- Born: Jens Adolf Ostrand; 20 January 1871 Tromsø, Norway
- Died: 15 April 1937 (aged 66) Oakland, California, U.S.
- Occupation: Lawyer, soldier
- Profession: Judge

Military service
- Allegiance: United States Army Quartermaster Corps
- Branch/service: 3rd U.S. Infantry Regiment (The Old Guard)
- Years of service: 1903-1903
- Unit: Infantry

James Adolph Ostrand (20 January 1871 – 15 April 1937) was a Norwegian-American soldier and lawyer who served as 22nd Associate Justice of the Supreme Court of the Philippines from 27 September 1921 to 30 June 1933.
