= Fletcher Ladd =

Associate Justice of the Supreme Court of the Philippines

The Honourable Fletcher Ladd
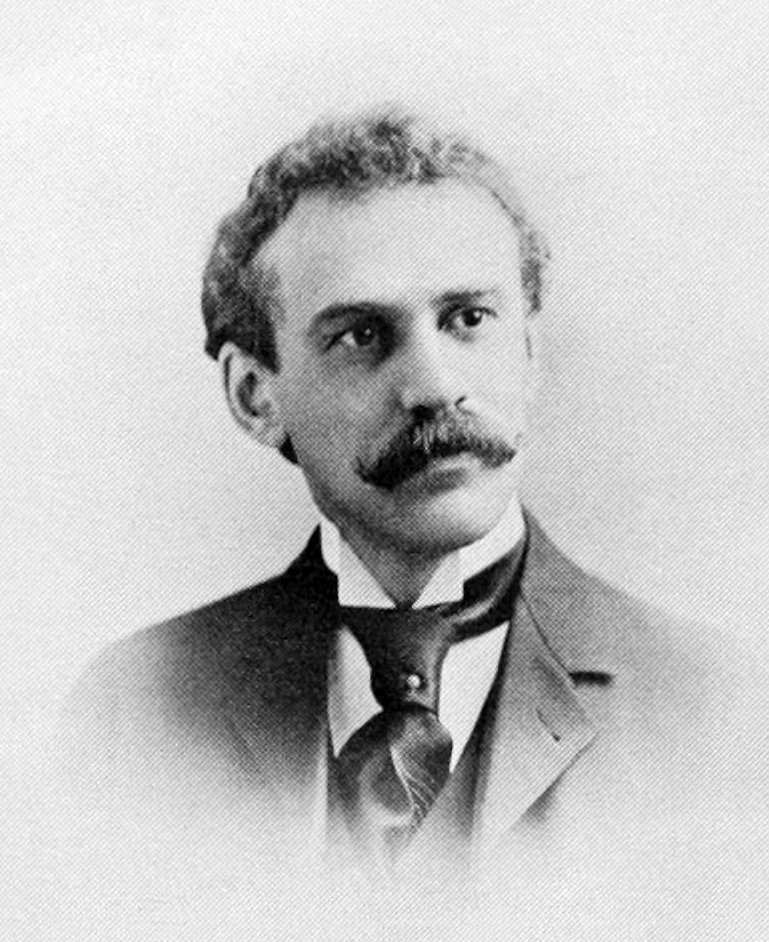
- Fletcher Ladd, c. 1893

7th Associate Justice of the Philippines
- In office June 17, 1901 – July 13, 1903
- Appointed by: William Mckinley
- Preceded by: Seat established
- Succeeded by: Elias Finley Johnson

Personal details
- Born: Fletcher Ladd; 21 December 1862 Lancaster, New Hampshire
- Died: 12 December 1903 (aged 40) Boston, Massachusetts
- Resting place: Summer Street Cemetery
- Children: 2
- Parent(s): William S. Ladd, Almira Barnes
- Education: Phillis Andover Academy, A.B., Dartmouth College, Harvard Law School(Bachelor of Laws),Heidelberg University
- Profession: Lawyer

Fletcher Ladd (21 December 1862 – 12 December 1903) was an American lawyer who served as an Associate Justice of the Supreme Court of the Philippines from June 17, 1901, until his resignation on July 13, 1903.

== Biography ==
Fletcher Ladd was born in Lancaster, New Hampshire on December 21, 1862, to William Spencer Ladd, judge of the Supreme Court of New Hampshire, and Almira Barnes; A family business, "Ladd and Fletcher" was founded by his uncle, Everett Fletcher. His mother, Almira, was said to be "one of the intellectual Fletcher family". He was described by those who knew him as a "sound lawyer" and a "brilliant man". Ladd graduated A.B. Dartmouth College He graduated from Philis Andover Academy in 1884. Ladd had interests in law and literature, and received his LL.B degree from Harvard law school. He also studied at Heidelberg University in Germany for two years. Ladd was also a member of Phi Beta Kappa Society.

== Career ==
Ladd was admitted to the bar in New Hampshire and Massachusetts in 1889 and to the Supreme Court of the United States in 1892. Ladd practiced law in Boston from 1889 to 1892, then returned to New Hampshire to become a member of the firm Ladd & Fletcher. When his father died, he joined practice of his uncle, Everett Fletcher.

=== As an Associate Justice ===
In 1900, President William Mckinley appointed Ladd as an associate justice of the Supreme Court of the Philippines, where he served from 1901 to 1903.

=== Health and death ===
Due to illness, Ladd was forced to resign in August 1903 and return home. He died four months later on December 12, 1903, in Boston, Massachusetts at the age of 40.
