= Charles Andrew Willard =

American judge

The Honorable Charles Andrew Willard
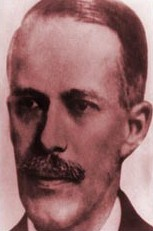
- Official portrait

Judge of the United States District Court for the District of Minnesota
- In office May 18, 1909 – March 13, 1914
- Appointed by: William Howard Taft
- Preceded by: Milton D. Purdy
- Succeeded by: Wilbur F. Booth

6th Associate Justice of the Supreme Court of the Philippines
- In office June 15, 1901 – April 24, 1904
- Appointed by: William McKinley
- Preceded by: Seat established
- Succeeded by: Adam Clarke Carson

Personal details
- Born: Charles Andrew Willard; May 21, 1857 St. Johnsbury, Vermont, U.S.
- Died: March 13, 1914 (aged 56) Minneapolis, Minnesota, U.S.
- Education: Dartmouth College (A.B.); Boston University School of Law (LL.B.)

Charles Andrew Willard (May 21, 1857 – March 13, 1914) was a United States district judge of the United States District Court for the District of Minnesota.

== Education and career ==
Born in St. Johnsbury, Vermont, Willard received an Artium Baccalaureus degree from Dartmouth College in 1877, and a Bachelor of Laws from Boston University School of Law in 1879. He was in private practice in St. Johnsbury from 1879 to 1882, then in Saint Paul, Minnesota until 1885, and then in Minneapolis, Minnesota until 1901. He was a lecturer at the University of Minnesota from 1887 to 1901. He was a United States Territorial Judge of the Supreme Court of the Philippine Islands from 1901 to 1909.

== Federal judicial service ==
On May 8, 1909, Willard was nominated by President William Howard Taft to a seat on the United States District Court for the District of Minnesota vacated by Judge Milton D. Purdy. Willard was confirmed by the United States Senate on May 18, 1909, and received his commission the same day. He served in that capacity until his death on March 13, 1914, in Minneapolis.

== Sources ==
Legal offices
Preceded by Milton D. Purdy	Judge of the United States District Court for the District of Minnesota; 1909–1914	Succeeded by Wilbur F. Booth
