= Lorenzo Relova =

Filipino judge and 103rd Associate Justice of the Supreme Court

103rd Associate Justice of the Supreme Court of the Philippines
- In office May 14, 1982 – January 19, 1986
- Appointed by: Ferdinand Marcos

Member of the Judicial and Bar Council for retired Supreme Court justices
- In office January 8, 1990 – July 9, 1993
- Appointed by: Corazon Aquino
- Preceded by: Nestor Alampay
- Succeeded by: Jose C. Campos

Personal details
- Born: January 20, 1916
- Died: April 23, 2014 (aged 98)
- Occupation: Supreme Court judge

Lorenzo Relova (January 20, 1916 – April 23, 2014) was a Filipino judge who served as the 103rd Associate Justice of the Supreme Court from May 14, 1982, until January 19, 1986, during the Marcos era. He was the country's oldest living Supreme Court justice at the time of his death in 2014.

== Early life and education ==
Relova was born on January 20, 1916, in Pila, Laguna, Philippines. His father, Jose Diaz Relova, was the first lawyer to practice in Pila. Uncle Regino Diaz Relova was a lieutenant colonel in the Katipunan in Laguna, Philippines.

Lorenzo Relova taught as a law professor at Ateneo Law School for more than forty years. In 2012, he was inducted into the university's Professors of Law Hall of Fame.

== Death ==
Relova died on April 23, 2014, at the age of 98. A memorial was held at Magallanes Church in Makati.
