= Isagani Cruz =

Filipino justice, lawyer

The Honorable Isagani A. Cruz

113th Associate Justice of the Supreme Court of the Philippines
- In office 16 April 1986 – 11 October 1994
- Appointed by: Corazon Aquino
- Preceded by: Nestor Alampay
- Succeeded by: Ricardo J. Francisco

Personal details
- Born: October 11, 1924 Manila
- Died: March 21, 2013 (aged 88)
- Spouse: Salvacion Lopez
- Education: The Manuel L. Quezon University (MLQU); University of the Philippines Diliman

Isagani A. Cruz (October 11, 1924 – March 21, 2013) was a Filipino judge who served as an associate justice of the Supreme Court of the Philippines from 1986 to 1994. He retired from the Supreme Court on October 11, 1994, due to the court's mandatory retirement age of 70 years.

== Personal life ==
Cruz was originally from Manila. He graduated from Manuel L. Quezon School of Law in 1951. He placed eighth in the 1951 Philippine Bar Examination with a score of 90.12%. He married his wife, Salvacion, on May 3, 1952.

Prior to his appointment to the High Court, Justice Cruz served, among others, as Chair of the Code Commission of the Department of Justice (1966-1972); Senior Partner, Laurel Law Offices; and Dean, College of Law, Lyceum of the Philippines University (1963-1968). He was also a full professor and/or bar reviewer in Political Law, Constitutional Law and International Law in the University of the East, San Beda College, Ateneo de Manila University, University of Santo Tomas, San Sebastian College, Adamson University, and University of Manila (1975-1986).

He wrote a column called "Separate Opinion" for the Philippine Daily Inquirer from 1995 to 2010 after retiring from the Supreme Court.

Isagani A. Cruz died in his sleep on March 21, 2013, at the age of 88. He was survived by his wife of 60 years, Salvacion, and six children - Cesar, Claro, Celso, Carlo, Isagani Jr., and Cynthia.

== Notable opinions ==
- Javier v. Comelec (1986) – "where the Court effectively ruled in favor of Evelio Javier, a rival of Marcos’ KBL party member Arturo Pacificador, in the Batasan polls in May 1984 in Antique. In 1986, Javier was killed in an ambush during the pendency of the case."
- People v. Carmina (1991) the high court held "Even if treachery were not present in this case, the crime would still be murder because of the dismemberment of the dead body. One of the qualifying circumstances of murder under Article 248, par. 6, of the Revised Penal Code is "outraging or scoffing at (the) person or corpse" of the victim." (joined by Justices Narvasa, Gancayco, Griño-Aquino and Medialdea)
- Ebralinag v School Superintendent
