= Joseph F. Cooper =

American jurist

The Honorable Joseph F. Cooper

5th Associate Justice of the Philippine Supreme Court
- In office June 17, 1901 – October 17, 1904
- Appointed by: William Howard Taft

Personal details
- Born: March 30, 1854
- Died: April 8, 1942 (aged 88)

Joseph F. Cooper (March 30, 1854 – April 18, 1942) was an American jurist who served as an Associate Justice of the Supreme Court of the Philippines.

== Profile ==
Hailing from Texas, he was appointed as one of the first seven judges of the Supreme Court of the Philippines under American civilian rule. During his three-year stint at the Court, he authored sixty-eight (68) decisions.

== Notes ==
Preceded by American military rule	Associate Justice of the Supreme Court of the Philippines; 1901–1904	Succeeded by
