= Midas Marquez =

Filipino judge (born 1966)

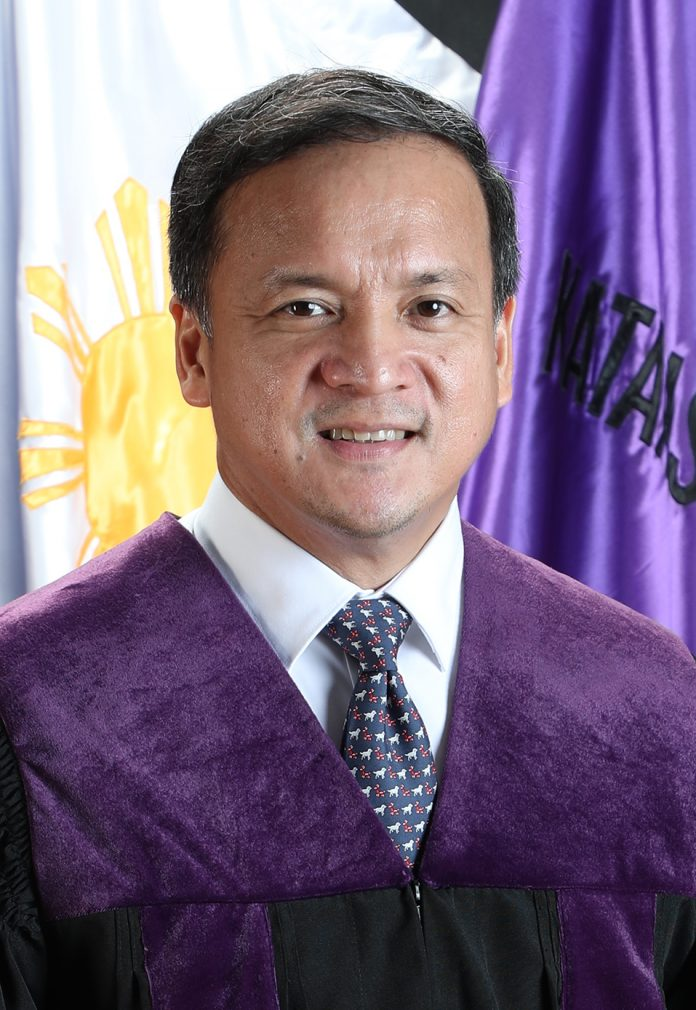
- Marquez in December 2022

Associate Justice of the Supreme Court of the Philippines
- Incumbent
- Assumed office September 27, 2021
- Appointed by: Rodrigo Duterte
- Preceded by: Edgardo Delos Santos

14th Court Administrator of the Supreme Court of the Philippines
- In office January 10, 2009 – September 27, 2021
- Succeeded by: Raul Villanueva

Personal details
- Born: Jose Midas Pascual Marquez; February 16, 1966 (age 60)
- Education: Ateneo de Manila University (AB, JD)

Jose Midas Pascual Marquez (born February 16, 1966) is a Filipino judge who has served as an associate justice of the Supreme Court of the Philippines since 2021. He previously served as the 14th and longest-serving court administrator from 2009 to 2021 and as the spokesperson of the court.

== Early life and career ==
Marquez was born on February 16, 1966. He obtained his Bachelor of Arts in Economics in 1987 and Juris Doctor in 1993, both from the Ateneo de Manila University. Marquez graduated with a degree in law from the Ateneo de Manila University and became a member of the Philippine Bar in 1994. He was working with the position of Executive Assistant I at the age of 25, in his second year in law school.

Marquez has also been cited as chiefly responsible for the quo warranto filed against Chief Justice Maria Lourdes Sereno.

== Associate Justice of the Supreme Court of the Philippines ==
In 2018, then-presidential daughter and Davao City mayor Sara Duterte opposed his bid for a seat in the Supreme Court. She issued a statement saying the aspirant is trying to gain her favor by asking complainants and witnesses to withdraw the disbarment case filed against her for punching a sheriff during a demolition in 2011.

Marquez was included in the final shortlist of nominees as Associate Justice of the Supreme Court by the Judicial and Bar Council, with the recommendation of Chief Justice Alexander Gesmundo, before being submitted to President Rodrigo Duterte for the appointment. Duterte appointed Marquez as the 192nd associate justice of the Supreme Court of the Philippines on September 27, 2021.

Legal offices
Preceded by Edgardo Delos Santos	Associate Justice of the Supreme Court of the Philippines; 2021–present	Incumbent
