= Camilo Quiason =

Filipino lawyer

Associate Justice of the Supreme Court of the Philippines
- In office February 1, 1993 - July 17, 1995

Vice President and General Counsel of Meralco Securities Corporation
- In office 1972-1973

Personal details
- Born: July 18, 1925
- Died: September 7, 2014 (aged 89)
- Education: University of the Philippines
- Occupation: Lawyer, educator

Camilo Danganan Quiason (July 18, 1925 – September 7, 2014) was a Filipino lawyer. He served as Associate Justice of the Supreme Court of the Philippines from February 1, 1993 to July 17, 1995.

== Early life ==
He earned his Bachelor of Laws degree from the University of the Philippines College of Law in 1950 and his master's degree there in 1956. He joined Upsilon Sigma Phi in 1947.

He was a Fulbright scholar. He trained at the Southwestern Legal Center and was a fellow at the Academy of American and International Law, both in Dallas, Texas.

== Career ==
He was vice president and general counsel of Meralco Securities Corporation from 1972 to 1973. He was a solicitor in the Office of the Solicitor General from 1956 to 1966 and a special prosecutor of the Department of Justice from 1963 to 1964.

He served as corporate secretary of various corporations from 1974 to 1993, among which are ABS-CBN Broadcasting Corporation, First Philippine Holdings Corporation and Manila Electric Company.

He was a lecturer at the University of the Philippines Law Center from 1965 to 1968, an assistant professor of law at the Adamson University from 1963 to 1969 and at the University of the East from 1964 to 1972.

In 1974, he cofounded the Quiason Makalintal Barot Torres Ibarra and Sison Law Firm and served as senior partner until 1993, specializing in litigation, corporate law, arbitration and energy law. He rejoined the firm after his stint in the Supreme Court.

During the Aquino administration, he served as special counsel to the Presidential Commission on Good Government and the Solicitor General of the Philippines, helping in the recovery of the ill-gotten wealth from the dictator Ferdinand Marcos and his cronies.

He served as a member of the Integrated Bar of the Philippines committee that drafted the Code of Professional Responsibility for Lawyers.

In 2000, he became a member of a special study group formed by the Supreme Court to propose reforms in the bar exams. That year the National Historical Commission of the Philippines tapped him to chair a panel that ruled that Surigao City, and not Cagayan de Oro or Butuan cities, was the site of the first display of the Philippine flag in Mindanao on December 26, 1898.
