= Nestor Alampay =

Filipino judge (1920-1995)

The Honorable Nestor B. Alampay Sr.

127th Associate Justice of the Supreme Court of the Philippines
- In office January 24, 1985 – March 17, 1987
- Appointed by: Ferdinand Marcos; Corazon Aquino
- Preceded by: Pacifico de Castro

1st Judicial and Bar Council member for retired Supreme Court justices
- In office December 10, 1987 – December 10, 1989
- Appointed by: Corazon Aquino
- Preceded by: First occupant
- Succeeded by: Lorenzo Relova

Personal details
- Born: February 17, 1920 Manila, Philippine Islands
- Died: December 12, 1995 (aged 75)
- Education: University of the Philippines (BA); University of the Philippines (LLB)

Nestor Bautista Alampay Sr. (February 17, 1920 – December 12, 1995) was a former associate justice of the Supreme Court of the Philippines. He was sworn in as a member of the Supreme Court by President Ferdinand Marcos on January 24, 1985, was reappointed by President Corazon Aquino in 1986, and served until his retirement on March 17, 1987.

== Biography ==
Born in Manila on February 17, 1920, Alampay finished his elementary education in Santa Cruz, Laguna and his secondary education at the Ateneo de Manila. He obtained his pre-law degree and law degree from the University of the Philippines College of Law where he graduated in 1941. During this time, he also joined the Upsilon Sigma Phi fraternity.

During the Second World War, he joined the guerrilla movement against the Japanese occupation as a member of the Hunters ROTC while concurrently serving as secretary to the governor of Laguna. He ended the war as a Judge Advocate with the rank of captain in the Philippine Army in 1945.

Alampay's career in the judiciary began in 1950, when he was appointed as Assistant Provincial Fiscal (prosecutor) of Laguna. He then became fiscal of Antique before becoming a judge in Negros Occidental in 1967. In 1977, he joined the Court of Appeals as an associate justice before being appointed to the Supreme Court in 1985.

During the EDSA People Power Revolution in 1986, Alampay publicly broke away from the regime of this appointer, President Ferdinand Marcos, and issued his resignation letter over Radio Veritas on February 23. After Marcos was ousted, Alampay was reappointed to the Supreme Court by President Corazon Aquino.

Alampay retired in 1987 and died in 1995.

Legal offices
Preceded by Pacifico de Castro	Associate Justice of the Supreme Court; 24 January 1985–17 March 1987	Succeeded by
