= Florentino P. Feliciano =

Associate Justice of the Supreme Court of the Philippines

The Honorable Florentino Panlilio Feliciano

115th Associate Justice of the Supreme Court of the Philippines
- In office August 8, 1986 – December 13, 1995
- Appointed by: Corazon Aquino
- Preceded by: Venicio T. Escoin
- Succeeded by: Justo P. Torres, Jr.

Chairman of the Appellate Body of the World Trade Organization
- In office 2000–2001

Member of the Appellate Body of the World Trade Organization
- In office 1995–2000

Personal details
- Born: Florentino P. Feliciano; March 14, 1928
- Died: December 15, 2015 (aged 87)
- Education: University of the Philippines College of Law
- Affiliation: Upsilon Sigma Phi

Florentino Panlilio Feliciano (1928–2015) was the 115th Associate Justice of the Supreme Court of the Philippines. Before serving as a judge of the Philippines' highest court from 1986 to 1995, he had a long career as a corporate lawyer and legal scholar. Known for his expertise in commercial law and international law, he retired from the Supreme Court to serve as member, and later, chairperson, of the Appellate Body of the World Trade Organization.

== Education ==
Feliciano obtained his Bachelor of Arts (summa cum laude) and Law (magna cum laude) degrees from the University of the Philippines. He was a member of the Upsilon Sigma Phi. He received his Master of Laws and Doctor of Juridical Science, both at Yale University.

== Career ==
Prior to his appointment to the Supreme Court, Feliciano was managing partner of the law firm Sycip Salazar Hernandez Gatmaitan, where he worked from 1962 to 1986. An expert in international and commercial law, he was part of the Faculties of Law of the University of the Philippines and of Yale University. He has lectured at The Hague Academy of International Law and served as a Member of the Curatorium of the Academy. He was also a Member of the Institut de Droit International; and has written and published on various aspects of international business law and public international law. After his term as member of the WTO Appellate Body, he was appointed as chairperson of an investigatory commission into the 2003 Oakwood mutiny, which became known as the Feliciano Commission. He also served as member of the World Bank Administrative Tribunal from 2002 until his death in 2015.

== Scholarly works ==
Law and Minimum World Public Order: The Legal Regulation of International Coercion (Yale University Press, 1961). (co-author with Myres McDougall)

The International Law of War : Transnational Coercion and World Public Order (co-author with Myres McDougall)

Deconstruction of Constitutional Limitations and the Tariff Regime of the Philippines: The Strange Persistence of a Martial Law Syndrome (sole author). Philippine Law Journal, Vol. 84, No. 2, p. 311.

== Notable Decisions and Resolutions ==
=== Supreme Court ===
Bulletin Publishing Corp. v. Noel, 249 Phil. 254 (1988)

Cochingyan, Jr. v. R & B Surety and Insurance Co., Inc., 235 Phil. 332 (1987)

Busuego v. Court of Appeals, 235 Phil. 375 (1987)

Tamargo v. Court of Appeals, 285 Phil. 72 (1992)

Sesbreño v. Court of Appeals, G.R. No. 89252, May 24, 1993

Philippine Telegraph and Telephone Corp. v. National Labor Relations Commission, 321 Phil. 372 (1995)

Garcia v. Executive Secretary, 286 Phil. 322 (1992)

Boy Scouts of the Philippines v. National Labor Relations Commission, 273 Phil. 390 (1991)

Broadway Centrum Condominium Corp. v. Tropical Hut Food Market, Inc., G.R. No. 79642, July 5, 1993.

=== Investment Law Disputes ===
Occidental Petroleum Corporation and Occidental Exploration and Production Company v. The Republic of Ecuador, ICSID Case No. ARB/06/11, Decision on the Request to Modify the Decision on the Stay of Enforcement of the Award (September 23, 2014)

Occidental Petroleum Corporation and Occidental Exploration and Production Company v. The Republic of Ecuador, ICSID Case No. ARB/06/11, Decision on the Stay of Enforcement of the Award (September 30, 2013)

Occidental Petroleum Corporation and Occidental Exploration and Production Company v. The Republic of Ecuador, ICSID Case No. ARB/06/11, Procedural Order No. 1 (April 10, 2013)

Daimler Financial Services v. Argentina, ICSID Case No. ARB/05/1, Decision on Annulment (January 7, 2015) SGS Société Générale de Surveillance S.A. v. Islamic Republic of Pakistan, ICSID Case No. ARB/01/13 (Swiss Confederation/Pakistan BIT), Jurisdiction (August 6, 2003)

Soufraki v. United Arab Emirates, ICSID Case No. ARB/02/7 (Italy/United Arab Emirates BIT), Decision of the Ad Hoc Committee on the Application for Annulment of Mr Saufraki (June 5, 2007)

Soufraki v. United Arab Emirates, ICSID Case No. ARB/02/7 (Italy/United Arab Emirates BIT), Rectification of the Annulment Decision (August 13, 2007)

SGS Société Générale de Surveillance S.A. v. Islamic Republic of Pakistan, ICSID Case No. ARB/01/13 (Swiss Confederation/Pakistan BIT), Procedural Order No. 2 (October 16, 2002)

ADF Group Inc. v United States, ICSID Case No. ARB(AF)/00/1, Award

Azpetrol International Holdings B.V., Azpetrol Group B.V. and Azpetrol Oil Services Group B.V. v. The Republic of Azerbaijan, ICSID Case No. ARB/06/15 (ECT), Award

== Personal life ==
Feliciano was born in Manila, Philippines, to José Maria Feliciano and Anatolia Panlilio. His father was a former Head of the Department of Geology and Geography in the old College of Liberal Arts of the University of the Philippines, while his mother was a pharmacy graduate. Feliciano is the father-in-law of Hans B. Sicat, president and CEO of the Philippine Stock Exchange. He was survived by his wife, Virginia Feliciano née Toralballa, children and in-laws Josephine Ann and Emmanuel, Regina Stella and Hans, and Robert.

Legal offices
Preceded by Court reorganised post last held by Venicio T. Escolin	Associate Justice of the Supreme Court of the Philippines; August 8, 1986 – December 13, 1995	Succeeded by Justo P. Torres, Jr.
