= Josef v. Ursua =

- Court: Supreme Court of the Philippines
- Division: Second Division

Full case name
- Jennifer C. Josef versus Evalyn G. Ursua
- Decided: February 5, 2025
- G.R. number: 267469
- Citation: 963 Phil. 354

Case history
- Prior action(s): Branch 87 of the Quezon City Regional Trial Court rules in favor of defendant (R-QZN-15-02221-CV) on June 28, 2019; RTC ruling affirmed by the Court of Appeals (CA-G.R. CV No. 114459) on August 11, 2022 and resolved on May 24, 2023; Plaintiff appeals to Supreme Court; certiorari granted
- Appealed from: Court of Appeals

Questions presented
- Whether or not the Court of Appeals erred in deciding if co-ownership of a house purchased by plaintiff and defendant in 2006 was sufficiently established through documentary evidence

Holding
- Ponente: Jhosep Lopez
- Article 148 of the Family Code, which governs property relations for cohabiting opposite-sex couples who cannot marry, is extended to same-sex couples in the legal absence of same-sex marriage. CA ruling is reversed, with the plaintiff found to be co-owner of the property in question and is entitled to half of the proceeds of its sale, plus damages.
- Majority: Jhosep Lopez, joined by Mario Lopez and Antonio Kho Jr.
- Concurrence: Amy Lazaro-Javier
- Concurrence: Marvic Leonen

Laws applied
- Family Code of the Philippines

Keywords
- Property rights, same-sex unions

Josef v. Ursua, 963 Phil. 354 (2025), is a 2025 landmark ruling of the Supreme Court of the Philippines which found that property acquired by cohabiting same-sex couples during the course of their relationship are presumed to be jointly owned by the couple despite the country's non-recognition of same-sex unions.

== Background ==
The case stems from a long-running property dispute between Jennifer Josef and her former partner, lawyer Evalyn Ursua. Ursua previously served as counsel to Suzette Nicolas, who in the 2006 Subic rape case accused four United States Marines of raping her.

Josef and Ursua purchased a house in Quezon City in 2006, but registered the property only under the name of one partner, in this case Ursua, for banking convenience. In 2007, Ursua acknowledged Josef's interest in the property, but the document reportedly contained ambiguous provisions regarding Josef's share. When the couple decided to end their relationship, the couple initially agreed to split the proceeds evenly.

Ursua subsequently reneged on the deal and denied Josef's interest in the property, leading Josef to file an adverse claim in 2010. In 2014, she sent a demand letter to Ursua for the property to be partitioned and her half of the proceeds sent to her, which led Ursua to seek damages from her former partner.

== See also ==
- Falcis III v. Civil Registrar-General
- LGBTQ rights in the Philippines
