= Recognition of same-sex unions in the Philippines =

The Philippines does not recognize same-sex marriage or civil unions. The Family Code of the Philippines defines marriage as between "a man and a woman". The Constitution of the Philippines does not mention the legality of same-sex unions or explicitly define marriage as being limited to opposite-sex couples.

== Background ==
On June 24, 2023, Quezon City launched a "Right to Care" (RTC; Tagalog: Karapatang Mag-alaga) card, allowing same-sex partners to make health-related decisions for each other through a power of attorney. "There have been reports of LGBTQIA+ community members who were prohibited from making crucial decisions when their partners were admitted to intensive care units of hospitals", said Mayor Joy Belmonte, who justified the measure. Neighboring San Juan passed a similar ordinance in June 2025, followed by Iloilo City in March 2026, and Dasmariñas, Mandaluyong and Parañaque in May 2026. On 4 May, Governor Abeng Remulla signed an ordinance granting same-sex partners in Cavite the right to represent and perform support functions during health-related emergencies, making it the first province in the Philippines to pass a "Right to Care" ordinance. Governor Pam Baricuatro signed a similar ordinance for Cebu on 1 June. "Every Cebuano deserves respect. Every Cebuano deserves dignity, and every Cebuano deserves to feel that they belong," Baricuatro said.

While same-sex unions are not recognized by the government, several lawmakers have introduced legislation to the Congress of the Philippines designed to recognize the property rights of same-sex couples. In 2013, Representative Edcel Lagman introduced a bill to allow cohabitating same-sex couples to register their partnerships at local civil registrars and document their co-owned goods. Another bill was presented in 2013 by Senator Imee Marcos. Both bills were unsuccessful.

On February 5, 2026, the Supreme Court of the Philippines ruled in Josef v. Ursua that property acquired by cohabiting same-sex couples during the course of their relationships are presumed to be jointly owned despite the lack of legal recognition of same-sex unions. The case involved a lesbian couple who bought property and goods together, but registered it under one partner's name to facilitate the sale. Upon separation, the partner whose name was on the title asserted full ownership, despite previously acknowledging the other partner's co-ownership. The Supreme Court held that article 148 of the Family Code, which governs property rights for cohabiting couples who cannot marry, can apply to same-sex couples if both parties contribute to acquiring a property. Justice Amy Lazaro-Javier emphasized the need to recognize same-sex couples, given the "glaring yet unjustified difference in the treatment of heterosexual couples vis-à-vis their homosexual counterparts." Human Rights Watch praised the ruling, adding that: "The Supreme Court's ruling is an important step toward equality. Lawmakers should build on its recognition of the lives that same-sex couples build together by enacting legislation that ensures equal rights and protections for all couples, regardless of sexual orientation or gender identity." Representative Jonathan Clement Abalos subsequently introduced legislation to explicitly codify the ruling into the Family Code.

== Civil unions ==
Laws regarding homosexuality in Asia Same-sex sexual activity legal Marriage performed Marriage recognized Other type of partnership Unregistered cohabitation No recognition of same-sex couples Restricted or ambiguous Restriction on freedom of expression, not enforced Severe restriction of association with arrests or detention Same-sex sexual activity illegal Prison, not enforced Prison Death penalty on books, not enforced Enforced death penalty

In October 2016, the Speaker of the House of Representatives, Pantaleon Alvarez, announced he would file a bill to legalize civil unions (Tagalog: unyong sibil, pronounced [ʔʊˈɲoŋ sɪˈbɪl]) (Note: In some languages of the Philippines: Cebuano: unyon sibil, pronounced [ʔʊˈn̪jon̪ s̪ɪˈbil̪]; Central Bikol: unyon sibil; Hiligaynon: unyon sibil, pronounced [ʔuˈnjon siˈbil]; Ilocano: union sibil, pronounced [ʔuˈɲon siˈbil]; Kapampangan: unyon sibil; Maguindanaon: unyon sibil; Maranao: unyon sibil; Pangasinan: unyon sibil; Tausug: unyon sibil, اوڽون سبيل; Waray: unyon sibil) for opposite-sex and same-sex couples. By October 25, more than 150 lawmakers had expressed their support for the bill. Alvarez introduced the legislation on October 10, 2017. It was also sponsored by representatives Geraldine Roman of Bataan, Gwendolyn Garcia of Cebu, and Raneo Abu of Batangas. In the Senate, conservative senators Tito Sotto and Joel Villanueva vowed to block the bill if it passed in the House of Representatives. Following the adjournment of the 17th Congress and the subsequent 2019 general elections, Alvarez reintroduced the civil union bill in May 2019. Representative Bernadette Herrera from the Bagong Henerasyon party also introduced civil union legislation during the 18th Congress. Herrera said she hoped the bill would "finally move forward after being dormant for so long". Herrera refiled her proposal in the 19th Congress.

In 2022, Senator Robin Padilla introduced a civil union bill, which would have included recognition of property, inheritance and adoption rights for same-sex partners. "It is high time that the Philippines provides equal rights and recognition for couples of the same sex with no prejudice as to sexual relationships are protected and recognized and given access to basic social protection and security. Providing equal rights and privileges for same-sex couples will in no way diminish or trample on the rights granted to married couples," said Padilla. The measure was characterized by the Catholic Bishops' Conference of the Philippines as an "infirmity" and a violation of "religious rights", even though the bill would not have forced the Catholic Church to recognize civil unions in any capacity. Padilla, a Muslim, also lost political support from some Islamic leaders.

== Same-sex marriage ==
=== Restrictions ===
The Family Code of the Philippines, enacted into law in 1987 by President Corazon Aquino, defines marriage as "a special contract of permanent union between a man and a woman". The Civil Code also includes mentions of marriage as being between "a man and a woman". The Constitution of the Philippines does not address same-sex marriage. Article XV states:

Marriage, as an inviolable social institution, is the foundation of the family and shall be protected by the State. (Note: Tagalog: Ang pag-aasawa, na di malalabag ng institusyong panlipunan, ay pundasyon ng pamilya at dapat pangalagaan ng Estado.)

There have been several attempts over the years to include more explicit restrictions. In 1998, Senator Marcelo Fernan filed two bills to append "biological" before "man" and "woman". Similarly, Representative Ruffy Biazon introduced a bill to the House of Representatives in 2004 to limit marriage to "natural born males" and "natural born females". His father, Rodolfo Biazon, presented a counterpart bill in the Senate. Further, Senator Miriam Defensor Santiago proposed a bill in 2004 to prohibit the recognition of same-sex unions validly solemnized abroad. Representative Rene Relampagos filed a similar bill in 2011. During the 14th Congress, Representative Benny Abante filed legislation to criminalize same-sex unions entirely. A former senior pastor of the Metropolitan Bible Baptist Church, Abante believed that same-sex unions were "highly immoral, scandalous and detestable". He proposed penalties for applicants and solemnizing officers. If the bill had become law, penalties would have ranged from 15 years' imprisonment and a fine of ₱150,000 for partners in an unauthorized same-sex union, as well as dismissal from government service and banned from re-employment in any public office if the offender were public employees, and up to 12 years' imprisonment and a ₱100,000 fine for "faking" or "misdeclaring" their gender to secure a marriage license. The proposed legislation would have also mandated local civil registrars to ascertain the applicants' genders before issuing any marriage license. All these bills were not passed into law.

=== Court case ===
On June 19, 2018, the Philippine Supreme Court heard oral arguments in a historic case seeking to legalize same-sex marriage in the Philippines, Falcis III vs. Civil Registrar-General. The court dismissed the case for lack of standing in September 2019, ruling that it could only make a decision if "real adversarial presentations" were shown, as the plaintiff could not claim injury since he was not seeking marriage for himself or had presented an actual case. The court, however, added that the Constitution in "plain text" imposes no restrictions on same-sex marriage. It stated that it was open to hearing future similar petitions with proper standing.

=== Religious performance ===
The Catholic Church strongly opposes same-sex marriage and does not allow its priests to officiate at such marriages. The Church exerts significant cultural influence in the Philippines, especially on social issues such as the recognition of same-sex unions, divorce and abortion. In 2013, the former Archbishop of Lingayen–Dagupan, Oscar Cruz, ruled out "any chance of the Catholic Church agreeing to same-sex unions in the Philippines". In 2015, Archbishop Socrates Villegas stated that "Catholics cannot participate in any way or even attend religious or legal ceremonies that celebrate and legitimize homosexual unions", adding that "families with members, who struggle with homosexuality, are called to love them unconditionally. This love, however, must be a love in truth that avoids praising, consenting to, or defending the so-called 'homosexual lifestyle'." In September 2022, the Church explicitly criticized the wedding ceremony of John Rey Lasap, a former Catholic seminarian, and Kirt Lester Ebrada in an LGBT-supporting Christian denomination in Albay. The couple stated in response, "The intrusion of the Catholic Bishops’ Conference of the Philippines into a marital decision by someone who is not institutionally connected to the church greatly oversteps the bounds of courtesy." In December 2023, the Holy See published Fiducia supplicans, a declaration allowing Catholic priests to bless couples who are not considered to be married according to church teaching, including the blessing of same-sex couples. Cardinal Pablo Virgilio David, the Bishop of Kalookan, stated in response, "What has been said in this Declaration regarding the blessings of same-sex couples is sufficient to guide the prudent and fatherly discernment of ordained ministers in this regard. Thus, beyond the guidance provided above, no further responses should be expected about possible ways to regulate details or practicalities regarding blessings of this type." The Catholic Bishops' Conference of the Philippines expressed support for the declaration, while continuing to "remain firm on the traditional doctrine of the Church about marriage".

Islam is the second largest religion in the Philippines, representing 6.4% of the population in 2020 according to the Philippine Statistics Authority. In 2022, Alim Abdulmajeed Djamla, the Grand Imam of the Marawi Grand Mosque, said a civil union bill introduced to the Philippine Congress was "tantamount to disbelief which is outside the creed of Islam." Djamla withdrew his political support for Senator Padilla, the sponsor of the civil union legislation, adding that "[t]his [was] based on the doctrine that same-sex marriage is forbidden (Haram) under Islamic law." He further incorrectly added that same-sex marriage was "considered immoral by all religions".

== Public opinion ==
While opinion polls have generally shown that Filipinos are tolerant of homosexuality, with a 2020 Pew Research Center survey showing that 73% of adult Filipinos agreed with the statement that "homosexuality should be accepted by society, support for the legal recognition of same-sex relationships remains low.

A survey conducted by Laylo Research Strategies in 2015 found that 70% of Filipinos "strongly" disagreed with same-sex marriage, while 14% "somewhat" disagreed, 12% "somewhat" agreed and 4% "strongly" agreed. A Social Weather Stations survey conducted in March 2018 found that 22% of Filipinos supported same-sex civil unions, whereas 61% were against and 16% were undecided.

== See also ==
- LGBT rights in the Philippines
- Recognition of same-sex unions in Asia
