= LGBTQ rights in the Philippines =

- Philippines
- Legal status: Legal
- Gender identity: Transgender people are not allowed to change legal gender
- Military: Gay, lesbian, bisexual and transgender people allowed to serve openly since 2009; Some restrictions on gender expression based on legal gender (ie. uniform)
- Discrimination protections: Only in the context of basic education; No general law at a national level, but many anti-discrimination ordinances exist at the local government level in some parts of the country

Family rights
- Recognition of relationships: No national legal recognition of same-sex relationships, some localities offer partnership certificates
- Restrictions: No constitutional prohibition but the Family Code of the Philippines defined marriage as "a permanent special contract union between a man and a woman".
- Adoption: Single individuals are allowed regardless of sexual orientation, but not for same-sex couples. Single LGBT adopters may sometimes be refused to adopt as unfit under "good moral character" criteria.

Lesbian, gay, bisexual, transgender, and queer (LGBTQ) rights in the Philippines have expanded in the 21st century, although LGBTQ+ individuals faced many difficulties in their homeland, such as prejudice, violence, abuse, assault, harassment and other forms of anti-LGBTQ rhetoric. Many LGBTQ Filipinos are met with mixed attitudes and reactions by their families, friends and others in their communities, as well as professionals, educators, their national public officials, politicians, attorneys and others working for the government and the rest of the general population.

Many individuals, groups and communities in the Philippines have helped LGBTQ Filipinos in need with LGBTQ-friendly counseling services and therapy sessions to help them escape dangerous and hostile environments.

Filipino LGBTQ individuals and groups, their communities, and LGBTQ allies have worked to promote and encourage social and political justice on a national level. They have engaged in social activism and advocacy based on human rights to pass pro-LGBTQ legislation on a national scale. LGBTQ Filipinos also have a higher rate of either developing suicidal ideation or attempting suicide.

Many equality bills for LGBTQ rights have been proposed since the 2000s, including the anti-discriminatory Sexual Orientation and Gender Identity Expression (SOGIE) Equality Bill. Despite failing to pass in the national government, many anti-discrimination ordinances on sexual orientation and gender identity exist in local administrative units in the Philippines, including the country's capital, Manila.

Meanwhile, an anti-bullying law includes sexual orientation and gender identity as some of its prohibited grounds.

In 2022, two civil union bills have been refiled and proposed by certain groups of public officials, politicians, lawmakers, lawyers, attorneys and others in the Philippine Congress which seeks to recognize, provide benefits and protection for same-sex couples in the Philippines.

As a member of the United Nations, the Philippines is being encouraged by various signatory international covenants to promote all forms of internationally based universal and fundamental human rights which includes promoting LGBTQ rights.

Alongside these developments, LGBTQ movements in the Philippines have been very active and gained some political representation.

== History ==
Prior to the Spanish occupation, non-labeled transgender women or feminine men usually (but not always) became babaylan, which are traditionally non-cis-women. Journal entries of Spanish colonizers describe "men who lived as women, and seen as women in the society" in reference to shamans of the animistic-polytheistic indigenous Philippine folk religions. They functioned as healers, mediators, and highly respected spiritual leaders of the communities on par with the ruling nobility. These shamans, however, were persecuted during the conversion of most Philippine ethnic groups into Christianity and Islam, resulting in the discrimination faced by the LGBTQ community in the present-day.

=== Precolonial period ===
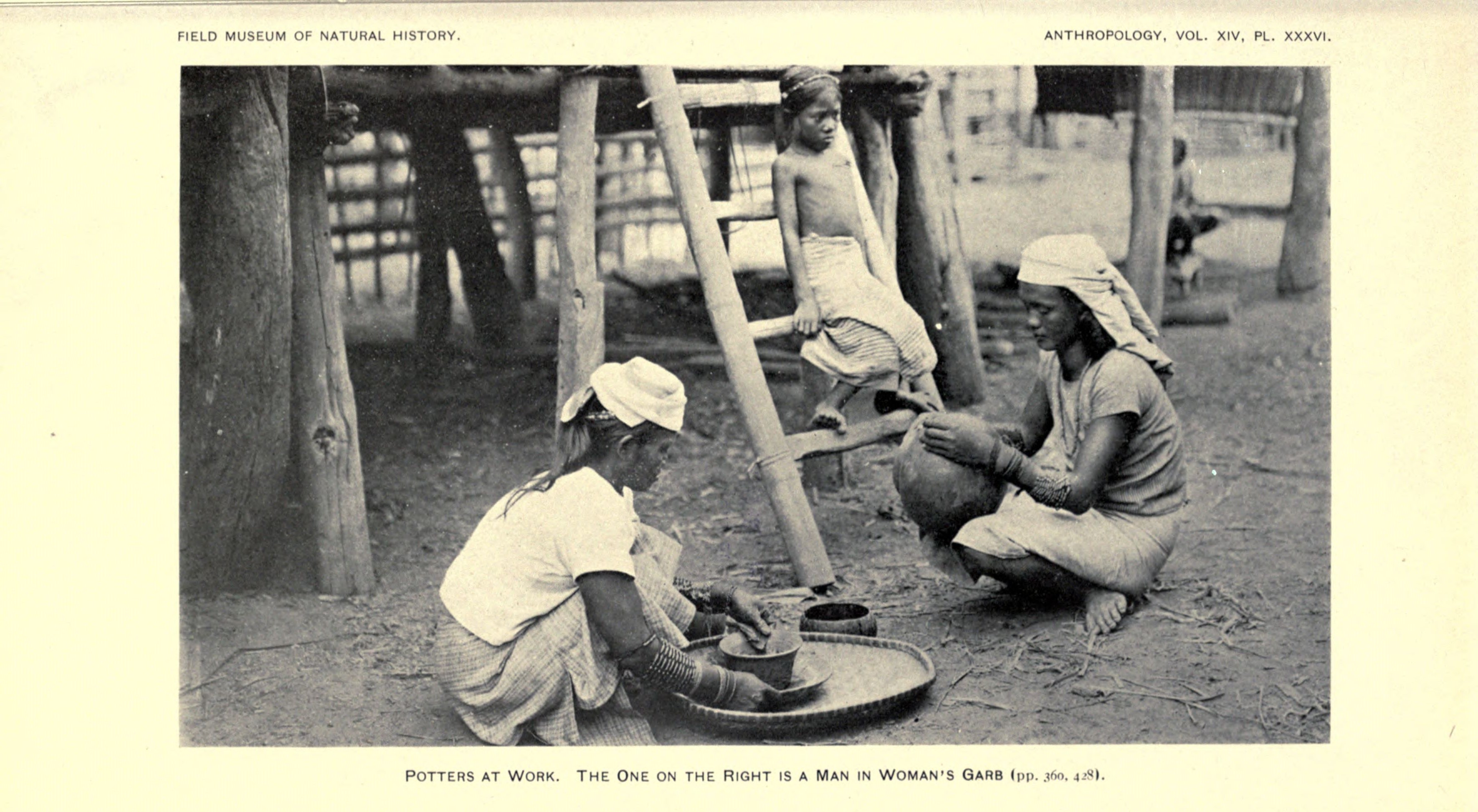
Itneg potters at work. The one on the right is a man in woman's garb (c. 1922)

Priestesses, or babaylan, held positions of authority as religious leaders or healers in some precolonial Philippine societies. Cross-dressing males sometimes took on the role of the female babaylan.

The babaylan, also called katalonan, bayoguin, bayok, agi-ngin, asog, bido and binabae depending on the ethnic group of the region, held important positions in the community. They were the spiritual leaders of the Filipino communities, tasked with responsibilities pertaining to rituals, agriculture, science, medicine, literature and other forms of knowledge that the community needed. In the absence of a datu, the babaylan could take charge of the whole community.

The role of the babaylan was mostly associated with women, but male babaylans also existed. Early historical accounts record the existence of male babaylans who wore feminine clothes and took the demeanor of a woman. Anatomy was not the only basis for gender. Being male or female was based primarily on occupation, appearance, actions and sexuality. A male babaylan could partake in romantic and sexual relations with other men without being judged by society.

Precolonial society accepted gender-crossing and transvestism as part of their culture. Rituals and trances performed by the babaylan mirrored the reunification of the opposites, the male and female. They believed that by doing this they would be able to exhibit spiritual potency, which would be used for healing spiritual brokenness. Outside this task, male babaylans sometimes indulged in homosexual relations. Additionally, many stories from indigenous oral literature exemplified the representation of LGBTQ characters through deities and the like.

During the Islamization of southwest Mindanao, barangays and states influenced by Islam expelled the belief of homosexual acceptance, resulting to discrimination of queer people despite the social participation and contribution of queer folks in their fields of expertise. Nevertheless, states and barangays that were not Islamized continued to practice acceptance on homosexuality and gender-bending cultures and belief systems.

=== Spanish colonial period ===
The Spanish conquistadors introduced a predominantly patriarchal culture to the precolonial Philippines. Men were expected to demonstrate masculinity in their society, alluding to the Spanish machismo or a strong sense of being a man. Confession manuals made by the Spanish friars during this period suspected that the natives were guilty of sodomy and homosexual acts. During the 17th–18th century Spanish Inquisition period, Spanish administrators burned people accused of being sodomites to enforce the decree made by Pedro Hurtado Desquibel, President of Audiencia.

Datus were appointed as the district officers of the Spaniards while the babaylan were reduced to relieving the worries of the natives. The removal of the datu system of localized governance affected babaylanship. The babaylans eventually dwindled with the colonization of the Spaniards. Issues about sexual orientation and gender identity were not widely discussed after the Spanish colonization.

Throughout the Spanish colonial period, numerous accounts of babaylan who defied Spanish colonial rule were recorded. The most prominent three of which are those of a Hiligaynon babaylan named Tapara, a Cebuano babaylan named Ponciano Elofre, and another Hiligaynon babaylan named Gregorio Lampino. A 1663 account of a fray named Juan Fernandez noted that a male babaylan named Tapara or Tapar from Lambunao, Iloilo led a revolt against the Spanish. Tapara was described as a "mystic who dressed and acted like a woman". The late 19th century had two prominent babaylans who led revolutions against Spain. The first is the skirt-wearing and allegedly bisexual (silahis) Ponciano Elofre. The other male babaylan was Gregorio Lampino. The era also brought about Leona Florentino, the country's foundational feminist poet and dramatist, known as the mother of Philippine women's literature and the pioneer in Philippine lesbian literature.

=== American colonial period ===
Four decades of American occupation saw the promulgation and regulation of sexuality through a modernized mass media and a standardized academic learning. Furthered by the growing influence of Western biomedicine, it conceived a specific sexological consciousness in which the "homosexual" was perceived and discriminated as a pathological or sick identity. Filipino homosexuals eventually identified to this oppressive identity and began engaging in projects of inversion, as the disparity of homo and hetero entrenched and became increasingly salient in the people's psychosexual logic.

Though American colonialism brought the Western notion of "gay" and all its discontents, it also simultaneously refunctioned to serve liberationist ends. While it stigmatized the local homosexual identity, the same colonialism made available a discussion and thus a discursive position which enabled the homosexualized bakla to speak. It was during the neocolonial period in the 1960s that a conceptual history of Philippine gay culture began to take form, wherein a "subcultural lingo of urban gay men that uses elements from Tagalog, English, Spanish and Japanese, as well as celebrities' names and trademark brands" developed, often referred to as swardspeak, gayspeak or baklese. Gay literature that was Philippine-centric also began to emerge during this period. Further developments in gay literature and academic learning saw the first demonstrations by LGBTQ political activists, particularly LGBTQ-specific pride marches. A known LGBTQ figure from this era (who only became much known after the 1990s) was Crispulo Trinidad Luna (1903–1970), also known as Pulong.

During the Japanese occupation of the Philippines (1942 to 1945), several Filipino LGBTQ people were forced into sexual slavery as comfort women, including several male minors. The story of Walterina Markova was told in a 2000 movie entitled Markova: Comfort Gay. He died in 2005 without any compensation from the Japanese Government, like the majority of Filipina comfort women.

=== 1960s to 1980s ===
Swardspeak, a form a slang used by homosexuals, emerged in the 1960s. This era also saw singer and performer Helen Cruz, a pioneering transgender activist. During the same time, and likely much earlier, Ukà of Lange-Lange, a transgender animist woman among the Teduray people, was recorded as being the most prominent musician in Mindanao, specializing in the kutiyapi, the most difficult and demanding of all indigenous Philippine musical instruments.

During the implementation of the martial law, citizens were silenced by the government of the Philippines through the military. People, including the LGBTQ community, did not have a voice during this period, and many were harassed and tortured. At the behest of Imelda Marcos, an anti-gay book was published that clarified the agonistic situation of gay culture at the same time that all other progressive movements in the country were being militaristically silenced. Many homosexuals fled or were forcefully exiled to the United States where some joined movements advocating LGBTQ rights. The community responded to this through the use of several mediums, such as the 1980s film Manila by Night, which introduces an LGBTQ character in its plotline. When the regime ended, those exiled returned to the Philippines, introducing new ideas of gay and lesbian conceptions.

During the 1970s and 1980s, Filipino concepts of "gay" were greatly influenced by Western notions. According to "Being LGBT in Asia: The Philippines Country Report", LGBTQ people who were exposed to the Western notion of being "gay" starting to have relationships with other LGBTQ people, instead of with heterosexual-identifying people. Towards the end of the 1980s, an increase in awareness of LGBTQ Filipinos occurred. In 1984, a number of gay plays were produced and staged. The plays that were released during the said time tackled the process of "coming out" by gay people.

=== 1990s ===
Based on a report made by USAID, in partnership with UNDP, entitled "Being LGBT in Asia: The Philippines Country Report", the LGBTQ community during the early 90s wrote several books that raised awareness, such as Ladlad, a 1993 anthology of Philippine gay writing edited by Danton Remoto and J. Neil Garcia, and Margarita Go-Singco Holmes's A Different Love: Being Gay in the Philippines in 1994. This decade also marked the first demonstration of attendance by an organized sector of the country's LGBTQ community in the participation of a lesbian group called Lesbian Collective, as they joined the International Women's Day March 1992. Another demonstration of attendance was made by ProGay Philippines and MCC Philippines, led by Oscar Atadero and Fr. Richard Mickley respectively, when they organized a Pride march on June 26, 1994, which marked the first Pride-related parade hosted by a country in Asia and the Pacific. Throughout the decade, various LGBTQ groups were formed such as the Metropolitan Community Churches (MCC) in 1991, UP Babaylan in 1992 and ProGay Philippines in 1993, and according to the report, the 1990s are the "probable maker of the emergence of the LGBT movement in the Philippines". In 1998, the Akbayan Citizens' Action Party became the first political party to consult the LGBTQ community and helped with the creation of the first LGBTQ lobby group, the Lesbian and Gay Legislative Advocacy Network, otherwise known as LAGABLAB, in 1999. LAGABLAB proposed revisions to LGBTQ rights in 1999 and filed the Anti-Discrimination Bill (ADB) in 2000.

=== Contemporary (2000s–present) ===
The LGBT movement has been very active in the new millennium. In the advent of the 2000s, more LGBTQ organizations were formed to serve specific needs, including sexual health (particularly HIV), psychosocial support, representation in sports events, religious and spiritual needs, and political representation. For example, the political party Ang Ladlad was founded by Danton Remoto, a renowned LGBTQ advocate, in 2003. The community has also shown their advocacies through the 21st LGBT Metro Manila Pride March held in Luneta Park on June 27, 2015, with the theme, "Fight For Love:Iba-Iba. Sama-Sama". This movement aims to remind the nation that the fight for LGBTQ rights is a fight for human rights. Advocates are calling on the Philippines to recognize the voices of people of diverse sexual orientations and gender identities. In present time, there remains no umbrella LGBTQ organization in the Philippines. Therefore, organizations tend to work independently of each other. Due to these divisions, there remains no prioritization of efforts, with organizations focusing on what they consider as important for them.

In December 2004, Marawi City city council voted to ban men from going out in public wearing female attire, makeup, earrings "or other ornaments to express their inclinations for femininity". The law passed by the Marawi City Council also bans skintight blue jeans, tube tops and other skimpy attire. Additionally, women (only) must not "induce impure thoughts or lustful desires". The mayor said these moves were part of an Islamic "cleaning and cleansing" drive.

In a United Nations Assembly meeting for the establishment of a UN-backed LGBT Watch Personnel, the Philippine permanent delegate abstained from voting. Islamic nations and some eastern European nations voted against its establishment. Nevertheless, countries from Western Europe and the Americas with the backing of Vietnam, South Korea and Mongolia, voted in favor of its establishment. The LGBT Watch Personnel was established after the majority of nations in the meeting voted in its favor. A few months after the establishment of the expert, an African-led coalition of nations made a move to dislodge the LGBTQ expert. In November 2016, UN members voted by a majority to retain the UN expert on LGBTQ issues. However, the representative of the Philippines chose to abstain again, despite outcry of support for the LGBTQ expert to be retained from various sectors in the country.

In 2016, Geraldine Roman became the first openly transgender woman elected to the Congress of the Philippines. Additionally, several openly LGBTQ people have been elected to local government positions throughout the Philippines, including as mayors or councillors. In Northern Samar, two of the province's 24 municipalities were run by openly LGBTQ mayors at that time. The provinces of Albay, Cebu, Leyte, Nueva Vizcaya and Quezon as well as Metro Manila have LGBTQ elected officials.

In late 2016, the Department of Social Welfare and Development (DSWD) under Secretary Judy Taguiwalo enforced a policy, together with the Department of Education, where they allowed students to use uniforms that match their gender identities, effectively accepting students who dress themselves as the opposite gender.

In July 2017, the Department of Education implemented the Gender-Responsive Basic Education Policy, which entails a review of public schools' curriculum to look at all forms of gender stereotypes, including LGBTQ-based. The policy also mandates the observance of gender and development related events in schools; stating that June be celebrated as Pride Month.

According to the report of the ASEAN SOGIE Caucus released in November 2017 in time for the ASEAN Summit, the Philippines is shifting to "a trend to be more open and accepting of LGBT issues" as seen in the rise of cooperation and acceptance from government officials, especially in municipalities and cities nationwide such as Zamboanga City, Metro Manila, Metro Cebu, Metro Davao, Baguio, and many more. The report also stated that there have been over 20 local government units that have adopted local ordinances on gender equality, but only two cities – Quezon City and Cebu City – have existing implementing rules and regulations (IRR).

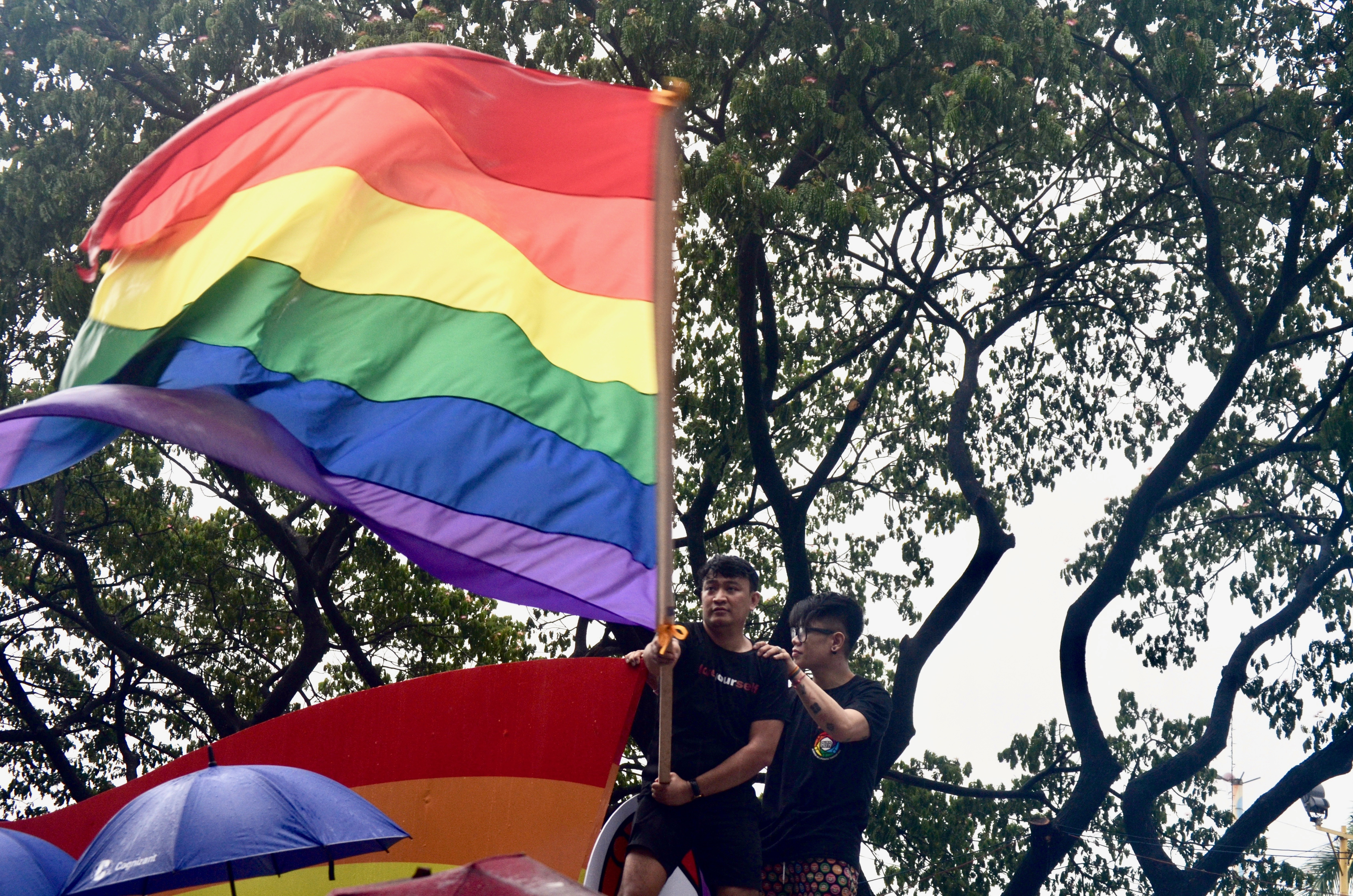
Large pride flag being flown in Marikina City, 2019

In November 2019, Kabacan, a municipality in Cotabato, prohibited cross-dressing and homosexual relations for Muslims with the penalty of imprisonment.

On June 26, 2020, police arrested around 20 people during an LGBT Pride march in Manila. The protesters were subsequently charged under various laws, though they were following social distancing protocols. Human Rights Watch accused the Philippine Government of using the COVID-19 pandemic to crack down on dissent and peaceful protests.

In November 2022, the newly elected government rejected the recommendations of the United Nations, including the passage of the SOGIE Equality Bill, stating that it was unacceptable for the administration. By June the following year, amid government inaction on the bill, a record-breaking 110,000+ people attended the 2023 Pride March, becoming the largest ever pride march in Southeast Asia. The passage of the SOGIE Equality Bill became the focal point of the festival.

In June 2023, the country's first Right to Care Card was launched by Quezon City. Announced by city mayor Joy Belmonte during the 'Pride PH Love Laban sa QC' Festival and in partnership with creative agency MullenLowe TREYNA, it allows LGBTQ couples to make medical and health decisions on behalf of each other. As hospitals and medical facilities only recognizes decisions made by legal spouses and next of kin, registered cardholders are able to bypass this restriction through this initiative, which was made operational through a special power of attorney. The city government aims to expand coverage to other Quezon City-based hospitals and medical facilities, as it begins rollout to government-owned hospitals first. The initiative was met with praise from the Philippine Commission on Human Rights, who lauded the city government's efforts to promote gender equality and to make healthcare more accessible, as well as adhering to values promoted by the equal protection clause affirmed in the 1987 Philippine Constitution and the Yogyakarta Principles.

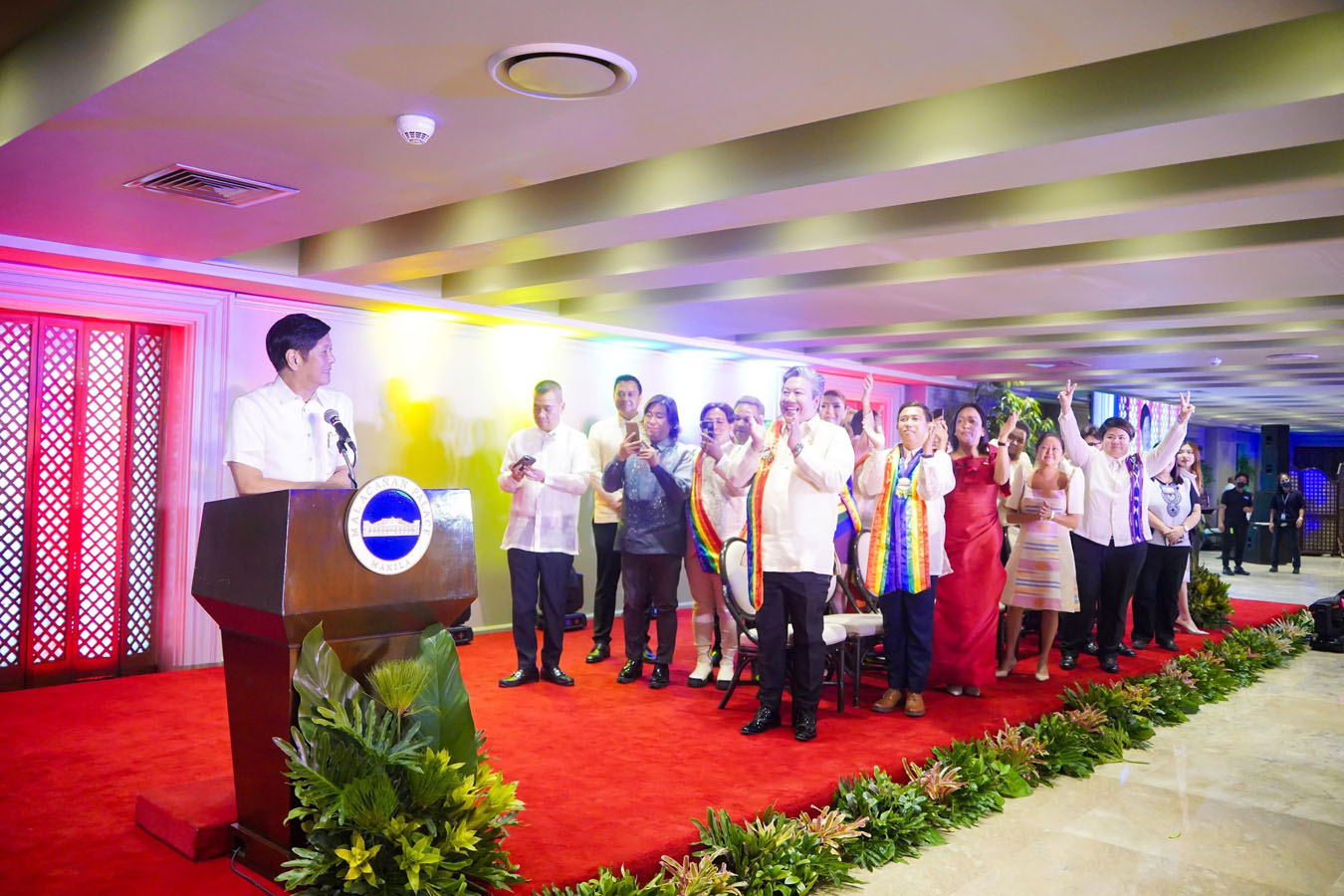
LGBT Pride reception at the Malacañang Palace

On December 22, 2023, President Bongbong Marcos signed Executive Order No. 51 to establish the Special Committee on Lesbian, Gay, Bisexual, Transgender, Queer, Intersex, and Asexual Affairs. This policy reinforces the national Diversity and Inclusion Program and reconstitutes the interagency committee on diversity and inclusion. Department secretaries were mandated to lead the reconstituted interagency committee while government officials and sector representatives constitute the special committee. Local government units were encouraged to support these measures.

In 2025, the Supreme Court of the Philippines ruled that the concealment of one's homosexuality from their spouse constituted a valid basis for the annulment of a marriage on the grounds of fraud.

== Laws regarding same-sex sexual activity ==
Non-commercial, private, consensual sexual activity between people of the same-sex is legal in the Philippines. There is no recorded evidence of any enforced penalties placed on any person that might have been prosecuted and convicted for such actions under criminal law. The age of consent law is set at the legally and equally restricted permissible minimum age of 16 years for all individuals from that age and others above that age as well, regardless of sexual orientation and gender identity. However, any form of sexual conduct or affection that occurs in public may be subject to the "grave scandal" prohibition in Article 200 of the Revised Penal Code, which states:

ARTICLE 200. Grave Scandal.—The penalties of arresto mayor and public censure shall be imposed upon any person who shall offend against decency or good customs by any highly scandalous conduct not expressly falling within any other article of this Code.

== Gender identity and expression ==
The Clerical Error Law of 2001 (RA 9048) makes it illegal for transgender persons in the Philippines to change their sex in their birth certificates. The said law specifically states that “no correction must involve the change of nationality, age, status or sex of the petitioner” without a judicial order. There was however at least one case where the Supreme Court of the Philippines affirmed a lower court’s decision to change the person’s gender legal marker due to the person’s intersex status.

No national law in the Philippines criminalizes cross-gender behavior. However, cross-dressers and transgender people may be excluded from some private and public spaces, oftentimes with little or no legal consequences. The Philippines has several accounts of gender diverse people being refused entry and service by establishments.

Marawi City passed an ordinance against "cross-dressing" in 2004. In December 2004, Marawi City banned men from going out in public wearing female attire, makeup, earrings "or other ornaments to express their inclinations for femininity". The resolution passed by the Marawi City Council also bans skintight blue jeans, tube tops and other skimpy attire. Additionally, women (only) must not "induce impure thoughts or lustful desires." The mayor said these moves were part of a "cleaning and cleansing" drive.

Murders of transgender and gender-nonconforming persons in the Philippines were reported from at least 2012. Several were notably committed by pro-ISIS groups in Marawi. In the aftermath of the five-month siege of Marawi by pro-ISIS militia, some affected Marawi residents blamed the city's LGBTQ community as having caused the wrath of the militias. Individuals perceived as LGBTQ were at times harassed in the displacement camps, as a result.

Kabacan, a municipality in Cotabato, has passed an ordinance against cross-dressing and homosexual relationships under the risk of imprisonment. This law applies to Muslims.

== Recognition of same-sex relationships ==
The Philippines does not legally recognize same-sex unions, either in the form of marriage or civil unions. The Family Code of the Philippines only recognizes marriages between "a man and a woman". The Constitution itself does not mention the legality of same-sex unions.

As of the 19th Congress, there are two proposals to introduce same sex unions in the Philippines. These are House Bill 1015, the Civil Partnership Act, of Bagong Henerasyon representative Bernadette Herrera and Senate Bill 449, the Civil Unions Act.

== Adoption ==
Same-sex couples may not file for joint adoption, given that same-sex unions are not recognized under the law. However, according to the eligibility requirements which govern Philippine domestic adoption, there are no explicit laws that bar LGBTQ+ individuals from adopting children. The requirements for being a prospective adopter do not take into consideration the adopter's sexual orientation or gender identity.

While this is the case, prospective LGBTQ adopters may still be considered unfit to adopt if the state decides that they do not have "good moral character". The Civil Code, the Family Code, and the Child and Youth Welfare Code require that parents must be able to provide moral formation for the child. The abstract nature of this parental duty leaves the term open to interpretation. Depending on the inclinations of the state, someone who is LGBTQ+ may not be allowed to exercise parental authority over a child because the state has judged them as "immoral".

== Discrimination protections ==
The Magna Carta for Public Social Workers addresses concerns regarding the discrimination of public social workers because of their sexual orientation:

Section 17. Rights of a Public Social Worker. – Public social workers shall have the following rights:

1.) Protection from discrimination on the grounds of sex, sexual orientation, age, political or religious beliefs, civil status, physical characteristics/disability or ethnicity;

2.) Protection from any form of interference, intimidation, harassment, or punishment, to include, but not limited to, arbitrary reassignment or termination of service, in the performance of his/her duties and responsibilities

The Magna Carta for Women also provides an insight regarding the state's duties towards maintaining the rights of women, regardless of their sexual orientation:

The State affirms women's rights as human rights and shall intensify its efforts to fulfill its duties under international and domestic law to recognize, respect, protect, fulfill, and promote all human rights and fundamental freedoms of women, especially marginalized women, in the economic, social, political, cultural, and other fields without distinction or discrimination on account of class, age, sex, gender, language, ethnicity, religion, ideology, disability, education, and status.

In 2001, a bill banning discrimination based on sexual orientation was unanimously approved by the House but it was stalled in the Senate, and ultimately died.

The only bill directly concerning discrimination against the LGBTQ community in the Philippines is the Anti-Discrimination Bill, also known as the SOGIE Equality Bill. This bill seeks that all persons regardless of sex, sexual orientation or gender identity be treated the same as everyone else, wherein conditions do not differ in the privileges granted and the liabilities enforced. The bill was introduced by Hon. Kaka J. Bag-ao, the District Representative of the Dinagat Islands, on July 1, 2013. A huge bloc of lawmakers, collectively called the Equality Champs of Congress, have been pushing for the full passage of the Anti-Discrimination Bill for 18 years. More than 130 lawmakers backed its complete passage and legislation in the first month of its reintroduction to Congress in 2016 alone.

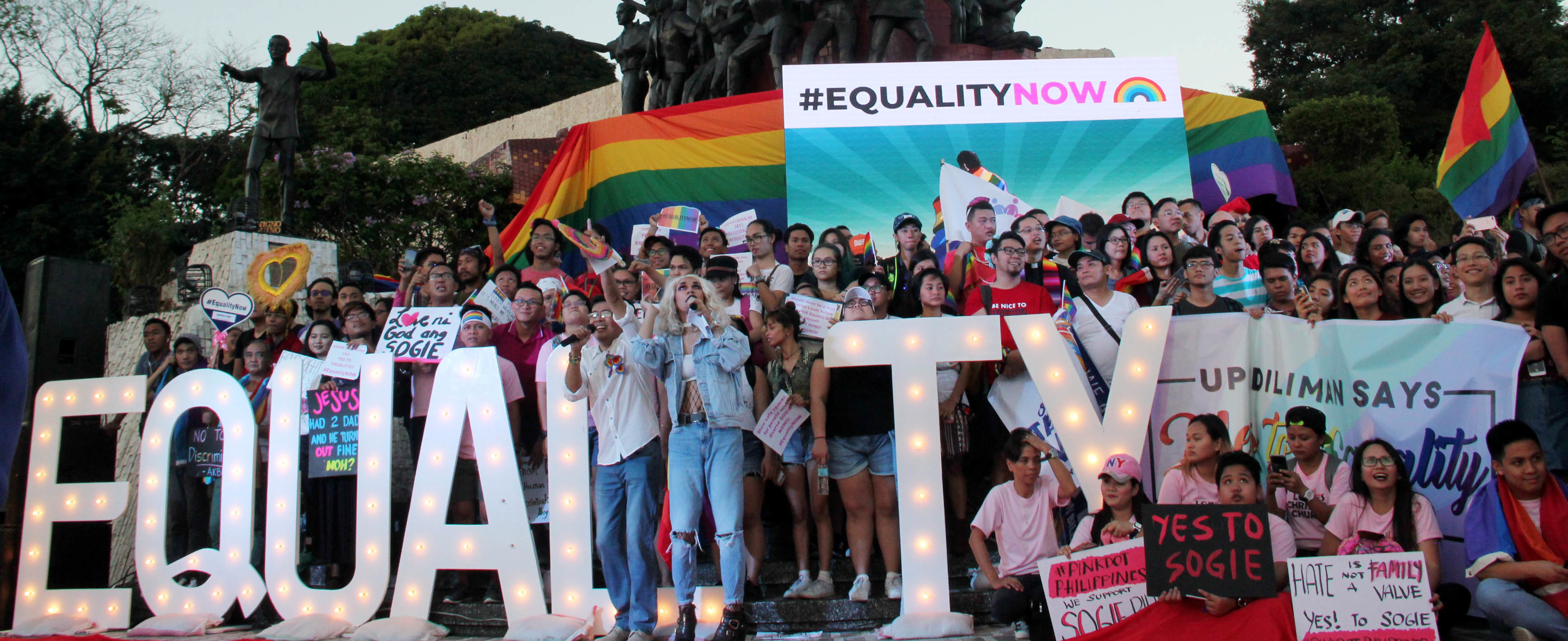
Supporters of the SOGIE Equality Bill at the People Power Monument, March 2018

On September 20, 2017, the bill passed its third reading in the House of Representatives, in a unanimous 198–0 vote, under the wing of representatives Kaka Bag-ao, Teddy Baguilat, Tom Villarin, Christopher de Venecia, Geraldine Roman, Arlene Brosas, Carlos Zarate, and House Speaker Pantaleon Alvarez after 17 years of languishing in Congress. After passage in the House, the bill had to be voted on in the Senate. Conservative senators Tito Sotto, Manny Pacquiao, and Joel Villanueva told media that they would block the bill at its current state, while Win Gatchalian, Dick Gordon, Migz Zubiri, Cynthia Villar, Ping Lacson, Gregorio Honasan, Alan Peter Cayetano, Chiz Escudero, Ralph Recto and Koko Pimentel expressed support only if modifications to the bill were passed. Senator Risa Hontiveros, the principal author and backer of the bill, championed the bill's passage in the Senate. The bill was also backed by senators Nancy Binay, Franklin Drilon, Bam Aquino, Loren Legarda, JV Ejercito, Kiko Pangilinan, Grace Poe, Antonio Trillanes, Sonny Angara, and Leila de Lima. In January 2018, the bill finally reached the period of amendments after the period of interpolations was deemed finished. It took almost a year before it reached the period of amendments due to conservative senators who vowed to block the bill until the very end. In February and March 2018, senators Sotto, Pacquiao and Villanueva renewed their call against the passage of the bill in any of its possible forms. In June 2019, with the end of the session of the 17th Congress, the bill officially died, as the Senate had failed to tackle it in that session. The bill has become one of the slowest-moving bills in the country's history. The passed house version of the bill would have penalised discrimination with a fine of not less than ₱100,000 but not more than ₱500,000, or imprisonment of between one and six years, depending on the court's decision. Senator Risa Hontiveros expressed confidence that the bill would pass the next Congress, and commented on the bill's wider acceptance among policy makers and the public.

In early July 2019, Senator Sonny Angara introduced a new proposal to Congress. "Any form of discrimination threatens social stability and economic progress in the Philippines, making it imperative that discrimination—or any act that establishes, promotes and perpetuates standing inequalities and disregards the right to 'equality of treatment' afforded by the 1987 Constitution—be reduced", Angara argued. The measure would prohibit unfair discrimination based on, among other categories, sex, sexual orientation and gender identity and expression. In September 2019, President Duterte expressed in-principle support for the bill, though stated that he personally preferred a general anti-discrimination law.

=== Local government ordinances ===
Map of provinces, cities, municipalities and barangays in the Philippines that have sexual orientation or gender identity protections Sexual orientation and gender identity protected Sexual orientation protected Does not protect sexual orientation and gender identity

Nine provinces prohibit discrimination on the basis of sexual orientation and gender identity. These are Aklan (2025), Albay (2022), Agusan del Norte (2014), Bataan (2021), Batangas (2015), Cavite (2014–18), the Dinagat Islands (2016), Ilocos Sur (2017), and Iloilo (2016). The province of Cavite previously prohibited discrimination based on sexual orientation only, but enacted gender identity protections in 2018.

Various cities, barangays and municipalities throughout the Philippines also have non-discrimination ordinances, some of which are as follows: Angeles City (2013), Antipolo (2015), Bacolod (2013), Baguio (2017), Batangas City (2016), Butuan (2016), Calamba (2017), Candon (2014), Carmen (2025), Cebu City (2012), Davao (2012), Dumaguete (2019), General Santos (2016), Himamaylan (2018), Ilagan (2019), Iloilo City (2018), Malabon (2018), Mandaluyong (2018), Mandaue (2016), Manila (2020), Marikina (2019), Orani (2019), Pasig (2022), Poro (2019), Puerto Princesa (2015), Quezon City (enacted in 2003, and expanded further in 2014), San Juan (2017), Santa Rosa (2014), Taguig (2018), Valenzuela (2019), Vigan (2014), Zamboanga City (2020), and Lapu-Lapu City (2023).

The city of Dagupan enacted an anti-discrimination ordinance in 2010, which includes sexual orientation as a protected characteristic. The anti-discrimination ordinance does not explicitly mention gender identity. However, the terms "sex", "gender" and "other status" could be interpreted as covering it.

=== Anti-bullying laws ===
Sexual orientation and gender identity are included as prohibited grounds of bullying in the Implementing Rules and Regulations (IRR) of the Anti-Bullying Law, approved by Congress in 2013.

=== Financial services ===
Generally, financial service providers have the right to select clients, except when such selection is discriminatory based on protected attributes, including gender and sexual orientation, as outlined in the Financial Products and Services Consumer Protection Act.

=== Property laws ===
Unmarried people can co-own property. In a decision released by the Supreme Court in 2026, it ruled that there is nothing precluding same-sex couples to co-own properties despite the lack of legal recognition of their union. The high court states that Article 148 of the Family Code of the Philippines regarding properties obtained by two people cohabitating is "broad enough to cover same-sex cohabitation and should not be limited to heterosexual relationships,"

=== Gender-based sexual harassment protections ===
Section 11 of the Safe Spaces Act defines specific acts that constitute Gender-Based Sexual Harassment (GBSH) in streets and public spaces. These acts include cursing, wolf-whistling, catcalling, leering, and intrusive gazing. Other prohibited behaviors are taunting, pursuing, unwanted invitations, misogynistic, transphobic, homophobic, and sexist slurs, as well as persistent unwanted comments on one’s appearance or relentless requests for personal information such as name, contact details, social media accounts, or destination. The use of words, gestures, or actions that ridicule a person based on sex, gender, or sexual orientation, identity, and/or expression—including sexist, homophobic, and transphobic statements and slurs—is also prohibited. Additionally, acts such as persistently telling sexual jokes, using sexual names, comments, or demands, and making statements that invade a person’s personal space or threaten their sense of personal safety are considered violations.

Penalties for these offenses vary depending on the number of violations. For a first offense, violators are fined ₱1,000 and required to complete 12 hours of community service, including attendance at a Gender Sensitivity Seminar conducted by the Philippine National Police (PNP) in coordination with the Local Government Unit (LGU) and the Philippine Commission on Women (PCW). A second offense is punishable by arresto menor (6 to 10 days) or a fine of ₱3,000. For a third offense, violators face arresto menor (11 to 30 days) and a fine of ₱10,000.

=== Anti-HIV and AIDS discrimination ===
Republic Act 11166 outlines state policies prohibiting discrimination related to HIV and AIDS, as well as other protected attributes that may intersect with or relate to actual or perceived HIV status, such as sexual orientation, gender identity, and expression, which are often associated with HIV. Specifically, it states:

"Policies and practices that discriminate on the basis of perceived or actual HIV status, sex, gender, sexual orientation, gender identity and expression, age, economic status, disability, and ethnicity hamper the enjoyment of basic human rights and freedoms guaranteed in the Constitution and are deemed inimical to national interest."

The Act also defines discrimination as:

"Discrimination refers to unfair or unjust treatment that distinguishes, excludes, restricts, or shows preferences based on any ground such as sex, gender, age, sexual orientation, gender identity and expression, economic status, disability, ethnicity, and HIV status, whether actual or perceived, and which has the purpose or effect of nullifying or impairing the recognition, enjoyment or exercise by all persons similarly situated, of all their rights and freedoms."

=== Executive Branch Diversity and Inclusion Policy (DIP) ===
Then President Rodrigo Duterte signed Executive Order No. 100 s. 2019 on December 17, 2019, institutionalizing the government’s Diversity and Inclusion Program (DIP) to protect and promote the rights and welfare of all Filipinos. The DIP serves as a national initiative to consolidate efforts and enforce laws, rules, and issuances against discrimination.

The program aims to foster a supportive, collaborative, and inclusive environment by ensuring equal opportunities and recognizing diverse perspectives. It includes training and orientation programs to equip government personnel with the skills to manage diversity effectively. Additionally, the DIP establishes accountability mechanisms within government institutions—such as departments, agencies, state universities, government corporations, and local government units—and provides processes for addressing discrimination-related complaints and other concerns.

Building on this initiative, President Ferdinand R. Marcos Jr. issued Executive Order No. 51 s. 2023, amending EO 100 s. 2019 to further strengthen the Diversity and Inclusion Program (DIP). The new order reconstitutes the Inter-Agency Committee on Diversity and Inclusion and establishes the Special Committee on Lesbian, Gay, Bisexual, Transgender, Queer, Intersex, and Asexual (LGBTQIA+) Affairs.

The creation of the Special Committee on LGBTQIA+ aims to enhance existing mechanisms to combat discrimination against the LGBTQIA+ community and provide a platform for their meaningful participation in government policy formulation.

=== Code of Professional Responsibility and Accountability ===
The Supreme Court in 2023, updates the 34-year-old Code of Professional Responsibility. It establishes ethical standards and accountability measures for lawyers, ensuring that their conduct upholds the integrity of the legal profession. Developed through consultations with over 2,000 legal practitioners, the CPRA aims to address modern legal challenges while safeguarding professionalism and human rights within the justice system.

The CPRA explicitly emphasizes fairness and respect for diversity, addressing discrimination based on various attributes, including sexual orientation, gender identity, and expression (SOGIE). It promotes inclusivity by requiring lawyers to avoid any actions or behavior that may perpetuate bias or discrimination. The code also outlines mechanisms to hold lawyers accountable if they engage in discriminatory practices, thus protecting individuals from prejudicial treatment in the legal profession.

== Living conditions ==
=== Religion ===
Several religious beliefs exist within the country, including Roman Catholicism, the Aglipayan Church, indigenous Philippine folk religions and Islam. These faiths have their own views and opinions towards the topic of homosexuality.

==== Roman Catholicism ====
The Philippines is a predominantly Catholic country with approximately 82.9% of the population claiming to be Roman Catholics. The Roman Catholic Church has been one of the most active religious organizations in the country in opposition to the LGBTQ community. The Catholic Bishops' Conference of the Philippines firmly states that marriage should only exist between a man and a woman. They have also called on individuals and politicians to actively oppose same-sex marriage, arguing that individuals should refuse to take part in ceremonies celebrating same-sex relationships and politicians should resist legalizing marriages of same-sex couples. They also stated that "A homosexual union is not and can never be a marriage as properly understood and so-called." However, according to Archbishop Socrates Villegas, "being a homosexual is not a sin. It is a state of a person." The Catholic Bishops’ Conference of the Philippines made a statement welcoming the LGBTQ community, stating that gay people should be "welcomed with respect and sensitivity".

==== Metropolitan Community Church ====
The Metropolitan Community Church (MCC) is a progressive, LGBTQ-affirming and ecumenical Christian Denomination that started in Los Angeles, October 6, 1968. It has three local churches in the Philippines, Mandaluyong, Makati, and Baguio, has been celebrating weddings between same-sex couples since the 1991. MCC Makati, the original and mother MCC Church in the Philippines started doing weddings (Holy Union) for LGBTQI+ couples since 1991. MCC Makati has since closed and stopped its operations in 2019. Open Table MCC (Mandaluyong) started in 2006 and Northern Sanctuary (Baguio) started in 2009. An MCC emerging ministry group also gathers in Marikina. The local churches consider themselves as an ecumenical Christian church which performs weddings for LGBTQI+ couples "regardless of their Christian backgrounds." The church leadership has said that "weddings are an inherent right of people who love each other." The first same-sex marriage that was performed by the founding church in Los Angeles, USA, was in 1969 between two lesbians. The time of the wedding was symbolic as it was the year when the globally-historic Stonewall riots took place, sparking the beginning of the LGBTQ rights movement.

The executive director of the non-governmental organization EnGendeRights has said that while the same-sex marriages performed by the MCC are not recognized civilly or legally, they are considered valid under the MCC's religious customs.

==== Philippine Independent Church ====
The Philippine Independent Church (also known as Iglesia Filipina Independiente and Aglipayan Church) has had a history of violence against members of the LGBTQ community. However, in the early 21st century, the church position changed dramatically to an extent where the church leadership apologized through an official statement to the LGBTQ community. The church recognized that it has "shown indifference, and [had made] LGBT people feel less human, discriminated against and stigmatized". The statement – dubbed "Our Common Humanity, Our Shared Dignity" – stresses the church's position that it "must openly embrace God's people of all sexes, sexual orientations, gender identities and expressions".

The apology statement's groundwork first came up in 2014, when a gay man articulated during the church plenary his query about the church's plans for sexual minorities. This led to discussions among the newly elected set of national youth officers, led by an openly gay president and a lesbian executive vice president, which would later be succeeded by another openly gay president. The church’s position on LGBTQ people was officially adopted by the entire church in February 2017.

On February 24, 2023, the church ordained Wylard "Wowa" Ledama, a trans woman and registered nurse-turned-seminarian, to the diaconate as the church's and country's first ordained trans clergy. She is assigned at the National Cathedral.

==== Iglesia ni Cristo ====
The Iglesia ni Cristo adheres to the teachings of the Bible and they denounce those who practice homosexual acts, as they are seen as immoral and wicked. The organization has been called by international human rights organizations, one of the most homophobic religious sects operating in the Philippines. These acts include having sexual affairs and relations with partners of the same sex, cross-dressing, and same-sex marriage. Furthermore, men are not allowed to have long hair, for it is seen as a symbol of femininity and should be exclusive to women only. LGBTQ people born into INC families reportedly suffer the greatest as their existence is branded explicitly as wicked by their own family and the pastor of their locality. Numerous cases also exist where INC members who chose to leave the faith faced massive backlash from family members, pastors, and other INC members locally and abroad, making it hard for INC members to get away from the church. Hate crimes and forced conversion therapy committed by family members towards INC LGBTQ teenagers have also surfaced and are backed by the Templo Sentral, the central establishment of the INC church.

==== United Methodist Church ====
The position of the United Methodist Church towards LGBTQ-inclusiveness is divided worldwide. In developed nations, members of the church tend to be more in favor of LGBTQ rights, whereas members in developing nations tend to oppose. In 2019, during a worldwide church meeting, held in the United States, Filipino delegates voted in favor of a strengthened ban on LGBTQ members. The agenda was approved with 438 voting in favor and 384 voting against.

==== Islam ====
For Muslim communities in the Philippines, dealing with homosexuality or transgender issues is a matter of sin and heresy. In sharia states abroad, male homosexuality is punishable by persecution and/or death, although this strict and controversial interpretation of Islamic law is not present in any areas of the Philippines where sharia is adhered to legally or socially. The city of Marawi, which has declared itself as an "Islamic City", has passed an ordinance that allows discrimination against LGBTQ citizens. The ordinance has yet to be challenged in court. Mohagher Iqbal, a senior MILF leader once said that "[w]e have no policy to kill gays and lesbians, but we discourage homosexuality". The statement came after reports that LGBTQ people are fleeing Marawi and a surge of reported derision and abuse at home and discrimination at school had steadily increased.

==== Indigenous folk religions ====
Indigenous belief systems and religions in the country, collectively known as Dayawism, regard homosexual acts as part of nature, and thus, acceptable, and to some extent, even sacred. Local men dressed up in women's apparel and acting like women were called, among other things, babaylan, bayoguin, bayok, agi-ngin, asog, bido and binabae. Some of these feminized men worked as spiritual leaders or shamans. They were respected leaders and figures of authority: religious functionaries and shamans. However, due to the influential spread of Islam in the southwestern-most region and Christianity in the entire country, such indigenous belief systems were subjugated. Concepts of homosexuality, bisexuality, and hermaphrodites are known in the epics and indigenous stories in Dayawism. Around 0.23% (an increase from the previous 0.19% in 2010) of the population continue to practice Dayawism since 2020, while majority of Filipinos continue to practice traditional beliefs while adhering to another religion.

=== Media ===
Recognized as an important venue for the promotion of issues related to the LGBTQ community by participants in national dialogue facilitated by the UNDP, the media acknowledges the negative impact of religion concerning the treatment of such issues, where it provides a blanket context that society views homosexuality as negative.

In May 2004, producers of several television programs received a memorandum from the chair of the Movie and Television Review and Classification Board (MTRCB), which warned against positive depictions of lesbian relationships; it was stated in the memo that "lesbian and homosexual relationships are an abnormality/aberration on prime-time TV programs gives the impression that the network is encouraging homosexual relationships."

The lack of sexual orientation and gender identity awareness is emphasized in other circumstances; transphobia is ubiquitous with media practitioners who do not address transgender people in accordance with how they self-identify. At the 2013 Cinemalaya indie awards, transgender actress Mimi Juareza won under the Best Actor category, and in reports, she was referred to repeatedly using the male pronoun. In 2014, the death of Jennifer Laude and the investigation conducted was highly publicized, with practitioners referring to her as Jeffrey "Jennifer" Laude.

Participants in the UNDP-facilitated national dialogue stated that content emphasized a general lack of understanding for sexual orientation and gender identity, such that LGBTQ stereotypes dominate; there are many gay men hosting programs at radio stations and television networks, but they are limited to covering entertainment shows. There is an apparent lack of representation for lesbians and transgender people. Given their platform, some media personalities have publicly shared their anti-LGBTQ sentiments; in 2009 newspaper columnist Ramon Tulfo wrote that LGBTQ people "should not also go around town proclaiming their preferences as if it was a badge of honor."

Beyond mainstream media, which already has a niche for the sector, the Internet has provided LGBTQ people ways to tell their stories outside the realm of film, television, print, and radio. There are blogs kept, opportunities to connect with others, publications with LGBTQ sections and a web-based magazine, Outrage, catering to the community.

The RainbowTV Major Massive Free-To-Air Television Network Launched in 10 July 2026 Our New Twist Philippine Television Broadcasting Via Channel 3 From Nationwide DOMSAT Broadcast. RainbowTV From The Philippine Television Programs from Viva Entertainment.

=== Views ===
Ryan Thoreson in his article "Capably Queer: Exploring the Intersections of Queerness and Poverty in the Urban Philippines" researched the LGBTQ community in the Philippines and how it copes with living in the country. He interviewed a total of 80 LGBTQ informants to gather the data. Based on his research LGBTQ employment and observations, he concluded that under a half of the respondents were employed and weekly income mean was only 1514.28 pesos per week. The survey also stated that "less than one-third have stable income and very few enjoyed any kind of benefits", and 75% of its respondents said that they would like to do more wage-earning work.

As for its empowerment section, the survey stated that when the respondents were asked to tell their primary contribution to the household, 45% of them named household chores as their primary contribution, 30% stated giving money or paying the bills, 17.5% provided labor and money, and 7.5% said that they were not expected to contribute anything. As for their privacy, 75% of the respondents said that they had enough privacy and personal space.

In terms of safety and security, Thoreson's journal also provides statistical data in terms of the LGBTQ community's involvement in crimes as victims. According to the survey he made, 55% of his respondents were harassed on the street, 31.2% were robbed, 25% had been physically assaulted, 6.25% had been sexually assaulted, 5% had survived a murder attempt, and 5% had been blackmailed by the police.

=== Economy ===
The LGBTQ community, although a minority in the economic sphere, still plays an integral role in the growth and maintenance of the economy. LGBTQ individuals face challenges in employment both on an individual level and as members of a community that is subject to discrimination and abuse. This can be compounded by the weak social status and position of the individuals involved.

A USAID study conducted in 2014, entitled "The Relationship between LGBT Inclusion and Economic Development: An Analysis of Emerging Economies", has shown that countries which have adopted anti-LGBTQ economic laws have lower GDPs compared to those who do not discriminate against employers/employees based on their sexual orientation. The link between discrimination and the economy is direct, since the discrimination experienced by members of the LGBTQ community turn them into disadvantaged workers, which can be bad for business. Disadvantaged workers usually practice absenteeism, low productivity, inadequate training and high turnover, which make for higher labor costs and lower profits. According to the USAID study, LGBTQ people in their sample countries are limited in their freedoms in ways that also create economic harms. This coincides with Emmanuel David's article, Transgender Worker and Queer Value at Global Call Centers in the Philippines, in which he states that "trans- and gender-variant people have always sought paid employment, and they have routinely performed unpaid labor and emotional work". In his article, he focuses on how in the Philippines there is a growing market of trans women looking for employment so they have tried creating their own space as "purple collar" but still face discrimination.

On the other hand, studies have shown that the integration of the LGBTQ community into the economic system yields a higher income for the country. In a recent USAID study, it is said that a wide range of scholarly theories from economics, political science, sociology, psychology, public health and other social sciences support the idea that full rights and inclusion of LGBTQ people are associated with higher levels of economic development and well-being for the country. Also, the acceptance of LGBTQ people within the office environment can lead to higher income for the company since the people do not feel as disadvantaged and as discriminated as before. Another thing is that a better environment for LGBTQ individuals can be an attractive bargaining chip for countries seeking multinational investments and even tourists, since a conservative climate that keeps LGBTQ people in the closet and policymakers from recognizing the human rights of LGBTQ people will hold their economy back from its full potential. Naturally, passing a non-discrimination law will not immediately lead to a sudden boost in the country's economy, although less discrimination should eventually lead to more output.

=== Politics ===
Marginalized sectors in society recognised in the national electoral law include categories such as elderly, peasants, labour, youth etc. Under the Philippine Constitution, some 20% of seats in the House of Representatives are reserved. In 1995 and 1997, unsuccessful efforts were made to reform the law so as to include LGBTQ people. A proponent of this reform was Senate President Pro Tempore Blas Ople who said (in 1997), "In view of the obvious dislike of the ... administration [of Fidel Ramos] for gay people, it is obvious that the president will not lift a finger to help them gain a sectoral seat."

The Communist Party of the Philippines (CPP) integrated LGBTQ rights into its party platform in 1992, becoming the first Philippine political party to do so. The Akbayan Citizens' Action Party was another early party (although a minor one) to advocate for LGBTQ rights in 1998. The CPP and its armed wing the New People’s Army (NPA) have performed same-sex marriages among members since 2005 in territories under their control.

Philippine political parties are typically very cautious about supporting gay rights, as most fall along the social conservative political spectrum. A major political opponent of LGBTQ rights legislation has been Congressman Bienvenido Abante (6th district, Manila) of the ruling conservative Christian party Lakas–CMD. Abante has proposed the criminalization of the conduct of same-sex union rites. He has also filed the Heterosexual Rights Act which explicitly guarantees people to express opinions against the LGBTQ community, especially negative stances which are based on religious grounds.

The administration of President Gloria Macapagal Arroyo was called "not just gender insensitive, but gender-dead" by then-Akbayan Party representative Risa Hontiveros. Rep. Hontiveros also said that the absence of any policy protecting the rights of lesbian, gay, bisexual and transgender people betrays the Government's homophobia: "this homophobic government treats LGBTs as second-class citizens."

On November 11, 2009, the Philippine Commission on Elections (COMELEC) denied the Filipino LGBTQ political party Ang Ladlad's petition to be allowed to run in the May 2010 elections, on the grounds of "immorality". In the 2007 elections, Ang Ladlad was previously disqualified for failing to prove they had nationwide membership.

On April 8, 2010, the Supreme Court of the Philippines reversed the ruling of COMELEC and allowed Ang Ladlad, a progressive political party with a primary agenda of combating discrimination and harassment on the basis of sexual orientation or gender identity, to join the May 2010 elections. The Ang Ladlad ran in 2010 and 2013 but were disqualified to run in 2016 due to inability to get the minimum number of votes in the past two elections.

On June 17, 2011, the Philippines abstained from signing the United Nations declaration on sexual orientation and gender identity, which condemns violence, harassment, discrimination, exclusion, stigmatization and prejudice based on sexual orientation and gender identity. However, on September 26, 2014, the country gave a landmark yes vote on a follow-up resolution by the UN Human Rights Council to fight violence and discrimination based on sexual orientation and gender identity (SOGI).

In May 2019, President Rodrigo Duterte joked that he used to be gay until he met his ex-wife, Elizabeth Zimmerman. The President claimed someone told him the way Antonio Trillanes—a critic of the Duterte administration—walked suggested he was a homosexual, saying "I said: "Are you sure?" They said: "You ask any gay person who sees Trillanes move, they'll say he's gay." No wonder. Good thing Trillanes and I are similar. But I cured myself. When I began a relationship with Zimmerman, I said, this is it. I became a man again." He subsequently added "Duterte is gay. So I am gay, I don't care if I'm gay or not". Duterte has often used terms such as "bakla" or "bayot", slang words for "gay", as insults to his political opponents. During his presidential campaign, Duterte expressed liberal views on homosexuality, saying the Bible should have recognized gay people. But as president, Duterte has been inconsistent on his views on same-sex marriage; in March 2017, claiming that marriage was only for a man and woman, but by the end of the year supporting a change in law to allow same-sex marriage. In January 2019, Duterte attacked the country's Catholic bishops and claimed most of them were gay after the church criticised his war on drugs, saying "Only I can say bishops are sons of bitches, damn you … Most of them are gay. They should come out in the open, cancel celibacy and allow them to have boyfriends".

== Community ==
The LGBTQ community did not begin to organize on behalf of its human rights until the 1990s. Poverty and the political situation in the Philippines, especially the dictatorship, may have made it difficult for the LGBTQ community to organize. One of the first openly gay people of significance was the filmmaker Lino Brocka.

The first LGBTQ pride parade in Asia and also the Philippines was co-led by ProGay Philippines and the Metropolitan Community Church Philippines (MCCPH) on June 26, 1994, at the Quezon Memorial Circle. It was held just a few years after students organized the UP Babaylan group. The pride event was attended by hundreds, and the march coincided with march against the Government's VAT or the value added tax.

Since the 1990s, LGBTQ people have become more organized and visible, both politically and socially. There are large annual LGBTQ pride festivals, and several LGBTQ organizations which focus on the concerns of university students, women and transgender people. There is a vibrant gay scene in the Philippines with several bars, clubs and saunas in Manila as well as various gay rights organizations.

- UP Babaylan, founded in 1992, remains the oldest and largest LGBTQ student organization in the Philippines.
- Progay-Philippines, founded in 1993, which led the first Gay March in Asia in 1994.
- LAGABLAB, the Lesbian and Gay Legislative Advocacy Network, established in 1999.
- STRAP (Society of Transsexual WOMEN of the Philippines), a Manila-based support group for transgender women, established in 2002.
- Philippine Network of Metropolitan Community Church, a network of MCC churches that reclaims spaces for sexuality and Christian spirituality. The first MCC was established in 1991 – MCC Manila that later renamed as MCC Makati which renamed again as Good Samaritan MCC. It has since closed and stopped operations in 2019. Other member churches are MCC Quezon City that later became Open Table MCC now located in Mandaluyong City, MCC Metro Baguio that later renamed as Northern Sanctuary MCC, and the emerging ministry group, MCC Marikina.
- PinoyFTM (PFTM or Pioneer Filipino Transgender men Movement), a nationwide organization of Filipino transgender men, established in July 2011.
- Task Force Pride (TFP), a network of LGBTQ organizations that is the official organizing network for the annual pride march, founded in 1999.
- Gayon Albay LGBT Organization, predominantly active in the Bicol region.
- Aromantic and Asexual Support Philippines, an online-based organization for aromantic and asexual people.

== Military service ==
Sexual orientation or religion does not exempt citizens from, the now defunct, Citizen Army Training (CAT), although people who are openly gay are harassed. On March 3, 2009, the Philippines announced that it was lifting its ban on allowing openly gay and bisexual men and women from enlisting and serving in the Philippine Armed Services.

The military still applies its standards based on one's legal gender, specifically the gender reflected on one's certificate on live birth. This applies to uniform policy.

== Public opinion ==
A Social Weather Stations poll in 2013 showed that 67% of Filipinos believed that “gays or lesbians are just as trustworthy as any other Filipino" and 54% believed that "gays and lesbians have contributed a lot in the progress of our society".

In 2020, a Pew Research Center poll showed that 73% of adult Filipinos agreed with the statement that "homosexuality should be accepted by society", no change from 2013 and up from 64% in 2002. Support was higher among 18–29-year-olds at 80%, Catholics at 80%, and the more educated at 79%. Another study in 2014, titled "Global Morality", from the same organization, showed that Filipinos disfavor homosexuality when asked "is homosexuality morally acceptable, unacceptable, or is not a moral issue", with 65% responded it is "unacceptable", only 25% responded with "acceptable", and 9% said "it is not a moral issue".

In May 2015, PlanetRomeo, an LGBTQ social network, published its first Gay Happiness Index (GHI). Gay men from over 120 countries were asked about how they feel about society's view on homosexuality, how do they experience the way they are treated by other people and how satisfied are they with their lives. The Philippines was ranked 41st with a GHI score of 50.

An opinion poll carried out by the Laylo Research Strategies in 2015 found that 70% of Filipinos strongly disagreed with same-sex marriage, 14% somewhat disagreed, 12% somewhat agreed and 4% strongly agreed. In generalization, the 2015 poll indicated that 84% were against same-sex marriage and 16% were in favor.

According to a 2017 poll carried out by ILGA, 63% of Filipinos agreed that gay, lesbian and bisexual people should enjoy the same rights as straight people, while 20% disagreed. Additionally, 63% agreed that they should be protected from workplace discrimination. 27% of Filipinos, however, said that people who are in same-sex relationships should be charged as criminals, while a plurality of 49% disagreed. As for transgender people, 72% agreed that they should have the same rights, 72% believed they should be protected from employment discrimination and 61% believed they should be allowed to change their legal gender.

A Social Weather Stations (SWS) survey, conducted between March 23 and 27, 2018, found that 22% of Filipinos supported same-sex civil unions, 61% were against and 16% were undecided.

According to a 2019 SWS poll, 55% of Filipinos supported an anti-discrimination law covering sexual orientation and gender identity, 27% "strongly agreed" and 28% "somewhat agreed". Conversely, 16% "strongly disagreed" and 10% "somewhat disagreed", with the rest being undecided. A separate question concerning transgender people showed that 64% of Filipinos opposed allowing trans women to use women's toilets (48% "strongly" and 16% "somewhat"). Opposition was higher among Mindanao residents, Ilocos Region residents, Muslims and those 55 and above. Nevertheless, a majority stated that they do not perceive transgender identity as a mental disorder or a religious sin.

A Social Weather Stations poll in 2023 showed that 79% of Filipinos agreed that "gays or lesbians are just as trustworthy as any other Filipino" while 7% disagreed, 73% agreed that "gays or lesbians have contributed a lot to the progress of our society" while 8% disagreed. Filipinos have more favorable views towards gays and lesbians (79%) than towards Muslims (65%).

== Summary table ==
Right	Yes/No	Note
Same-sex sexual activity
Same-sex sexual activity legal	Yes	Always legal
Equal age of consent (16)	Yes	Always equal
Discrimination protections regarding sexual orientation
Anti-discrimination laws in employment	Yes / No	Not nationwide; pending nationwide
Anti-discrimination laws in the provision of goods and services	Yes / No	Not nationwide; pending nationwide
Anti-bullying legislation in schools and colleges	Yes / No	Basic education level only
Anti-discrimination laws in all other areas (incl. indirect discrimination, hate speech)	Yes / No	Not nationwide; pending nationwide
Recognition of same-sex relationships
Same-sex marriage(s)	No	Marriage limited to a man and a woman as per the Family Code
Recognition of same-sex couples	Yes / No	Some jurisdictions offer partnership certificates
Adoption and family planning
Stepchild adoption by same-sex couples	No	
Joint adoption by same-sex couples	No	
Adoption by single people regardless of sexual orientation	Yes /	No specific law precluding single LGBTQ adoption
Automatic parenthood for both spouses after birth	No	Under Philippine law only the birth mother and the biological father are automatically conferred legal parenthood
Access to IVF for lesbians	Barriers	No legal framework for assisted reproductive technology and surrogacy in general. Existing laws on parenthood provides legal challenges for lesbian and male couples who avail of these services. The Philippine Society of Reproductive Medicine prohibits in vitro fertilization and surrogacy through donor sperm and egg cells among its members.
Commercial surrogacy for gay male couples	Barriers	No legal framework for assisted reproductive technology and surrogacy in general. Existing laws on parenthood provides legal challenges for lesbian and male couples who avail of these services. The Philippine Society of Reproductive Medicine prohibits in vitro fertilization and surrogacy through donor sperm and egg cells among its members.
Gender identity
Freedom of gender identity expression	Yes	Not criminalized in principle
Right to change legal gender	No	Not allowed (ban affirmed by the Supreme Court under Silverio vs Philippines in 2007). Prior to that transgender people were able to exploit a legal loophole of the Clerical Error Law of 2001 which allowed the change of gender marker if one has not undergone sex reassignment surgery.
Right to change legal gender		See Cagandahan vs Philippines. The Supreme Court has allowed an intersex man who was observed as female at birth to change his legal gender to male since "nature was allowed to take its course" and his masculine characteristics were not a result of a sex reassignment surgery.
Legal recognition of non-binary gender	No	Intersex and non-binary identities not recognized.
Military service
Gay, lesbian, bisexual and transgender people allowed to serve in the military	Yes /	Since 2009 Dress code generally applied based on legal gender
Other rights
LGBTQ education	Barriers	Same-sex union topic included in curriculum for public schools since 2013.
Conversion therapy banned	No	
MSM allowed to donate blood		Donor deferral criteria includes "men who have had sexual contact with other men".

== See also ==
- LGBT rights in Asia
- Human rights in the Philippines
- Same-sex union court cases
- Single mother phenomenon of Philippines
