= Jesus Falcis =

Filipino lawyer

- Born: Jesus Nicardo Madarang Falcis III; 1986 or 1987 (age 39–40); Quezon City, Philippines
- Occupation: Lawyer

Instagram information
- Page: Jesus Falcis
- Years active: 2013–present
- Followers: 10 thousand

X information
- Handle: @jesusfalcis
- Display name: Jesus Falcis
- Years active: 2014–present
- Topics: Law, politics, culture
- Followers: 44 thousand

Jesus Nicardo Madarang Falcis III, is a Filipino lawyer, radio broadcaster, and LGBTQ rights advocate. He is known for Falcis III v. Civil Registrar-General, a petition which sought the legalization of same-sex marriage in the Philippines via the Supreme Court.

== Early life and education ==
Jesus Nicardo Falcis III was born on 1986 or 1987 in Quezon City to an oncologist mother from Cebu City and an engineer father from Mindoro. He is the youngest of three children; His eldest sibling is his sister and the younger older sibling Nicko is his brother.

Jesus Falcis graduated from the University of the Philippines (UP) College of Law in 2014 and passed the Philippine Bar Exam in May 2015. He took up law, in order to "change it" and advocate for the LGBTQ community as someone who experienced as discrimination as a gay man.

== Cases ==
=== Falcis III v. Civil Registrar-General ===
In October 2015, Falcis filed a petition in the Supreme Court seeking for the legalization of same-sex marriage via challenging the prohibitions as laid in the Family Code.

However the court questioned the petition on procedural grounds, believing that the issue should be tackled in the lower courts first and that Falcis has no legal standing as he is not seeking a marriage license for himself. The high court dismissed the petition in September 19 although it recognized the struggles of the LGBTQ community and such matters should be resolved by the Congress. The motion for partial reconsideration was denied on September 3, 2019, a ruling publicized on January 6, 2020.

=== Kris Aquino–Nicko Falcis case ===
In 2018, Jesus Falcis' older brother Nicko was charged with estafa or fraud among other charges by the elder Falcis' former business associate and actress Kris Aquino. The elder Falcis was managing director of Kris Cojuangco Aquino Productions (KCAP). The Falcises filed two counts of grave threats against Aquino in January 2019, which were dismissed in April 2019. Nicko Falcis and Aquino reportedly settled in October 2019 with Aquino filing affidavits to withdraw the cases she filed.

The Supreme Court publicized a November 2025 decision on June 15, 2026, which suspened the younger Falcis was suspended from practicing his legal profession for using vulgar words in his social media post back in 2018 in defense of his brother Nicko. The high court acted on a case filed by Aquino's business partner Jason Gene Baltao. He accepted the suspension as the price to pay for defending his kin but implored the court to act on the pending disbarment cases lodged against former President Rodrigo Duterte and Vice President Sara Duterte.

== Television programs and digital media ==
Falcis began his broadcasting career on the radio network Radyo5 92.3 News FM and One PH. He served as a regular co-host for the political talk show BolJak, alongside lawyer Bruce Rivera and journalist Maeanne Los Baños. The show featured intense debates on national issues. Falcis represented the liberal and opposition viewpoint while Bruce Rivera defended the policies of the Duterte administration. The dynamic tension between the hosts generated significant listenership. The network eventually moved the program to an evening timeslot to accommodate new morning shows before concluding its run.

He transitioned to independent digital broadcasting through his YouTube channel Pinoy Lawyer Reacts. He utilizes this channel to provide accessible legal education to the general public.

His media engagements occur predominantly on the Bilyonaryo News Channel. He serves as a regular political analyst and guest host across multiple flagship programs on the network. He appears on the program The Spokes, OnPoint, and At The Forefront. He was given a regular appearance at the program Politiko Talks along with fellow lawyer and media personality Jimmy Bondoc.

In August 2026, Falcis started his own program Jess Asking on PRTV Prime Media.

== Political career ==
Aside from supporting same-sex marriage, Falcis supports the SOGIE Equality Bill and anti-discrimination legislation.

Falcis also became a local politician, and was elected as a barangay councilor for Laging Handa in Quezon City in the 2023 election.
