= Lina Sagaral Reyes =

Filipino journalist (1961–2024)

- Born: 6 July 1961; Villalimpia, Bohol, Philippines
- Died: 14 December 2024 (aged 63); Cagayan de Oro, Philippines
- Education: Silliman University
- Occupation: Journalist

Lina Sagaral Reyes (6 July 1961 – 14 December 2024) was a Filipino journalist. She was an environmental reporter.

Reyes was also a poet and advocated empowerment for women.

== Early life and education ==
Reyes was born in Villalimpia, Bohol on 6 July 1961 and grew up there. She took courses in journalism and creative writing at Silliman University from 1978 until 1983.

== Career ==
=== Journalism career ===
Reyes wrote for the Philippine Daily Inquirer and Mindanao Gold Star Daily as a correspondent.

=== Notable coverage ===
Reyes wrote exposes on sand dredging to accommodate an international resort in 1998; an investigation into an algal bloom in Macajalar Bay in 2000; and her in-depth probe into corporate pineapple farms and their carbon-negative claims in 2020.

== Death ==
Reyes died at the Northern Mindanao Medical Center in Cagayan de Oro, on 14 December 2024, at the age of 63. Her colleagues at the Cagayan de Oro Press Club said that she was rushed there two days earlier, due to breathing difficulties, and that she was undernourished, with low blood pressure and surged sugar levels.

== Awards and honours ==
- 1987: 1987 Palanca Award for Literature
- 1998: Jaime V. Ongpin Award for Investigative Journalism
- 2000: National Science and Technology Journalism Grand Prize
- 2020: Globe Media Excellence Award
