= Ladlad =

Political party in the Philippines

- Leader: Danton Remoto
- Chairperson: Brian Esmejarda
- Spokesperson: Bemz Benitez
- Founded: September 1, 2003
- Headquarters: Metro Manila
- Membership (2009): 22,000
- Ideology: Human rights LGBT rights Civil libertarianism
- Colors: Pink
- Slogan: Bukas isip. Bukas puso.

Website
- www.ladladpartylist.blogspot.com

Ladlad (Tagalog for "coming out," lit. "Unfurled", from the swardspeak pagladlád ng kapa lit. unfurling one's cape), formerly Ang Ladlad LGBT Party Inc. and sometimes colloquially known as "the LGBT party", is a Filipino lesbian, gay, bisexual, and transgender (LGBT) political party. It was founded on September 1, 2003, by Danton Remoto. They sought party-list representation at the House of Representatives in the 2010 and 2013 elections but failed to win a seat. They were delisted as a partylist organization by the COMELEC in 2015 but remain an active organization.

The party's official motto is "Bukas isip. Bukas puso." ("Open mind. Open heart.")

== History ==
Ladlad first tried to register with the Commission on Elections (COMELEC) in 2006, with the hopes of appearing on the 2007 ballot, but was denied for supposedly not having enough members. COMELEC further denied Ladlad's petition to be allowed to run in the 2010 elections, this time on the grounds of "immorality". However, on January 12, 2010, the Supreme Court granted a temporary restraining order, thereby allowing Ladlad to participate in the 2010 elections.

On April 8, 2010, the Supreme Court overturned the ban in the case of Ang Ladlad v. COMELEC (G.R. No. 190582), allowing Ladlad to join the elections. The party received 113,187 votes or 0.37% (excluding votes from Lanao del Sur), below the optional 2% threshold and was not able to win a seat in Congress.

In the 2013 elections, the party also failed to reach the minimum two percent of votes cast and failed to win a seat. Consequentially their COMELEC delisted their registration along with 38 partylist groups which failed to win a seat in two consecutive elections, barring the party from running in the 2016 elections.

== Programs and platforms ==
The organization's goals are focused toward human rights, and the organization fights for equal rights among all Filipinos, whether they are LGBTQ or not.

Ladlad has the following platforms:

1. to pass an anti-discrimination bill that would guarantee LGBTQ Filipinos equal opportunities and treatment;
2. funding employment opportunities and welfare programs for impoverished and disabled LGBTQ Filipinos;
3. setting up of centers for LGBTQ youth and seniors in need of protection.

Same-sex marriage is not part of the party's platform, although it would add it if it were to achieve the passage of its desired anti-discrimination bill.

== Electoral performance ==
Election	Votes	%	Seats
2010	114,120	0.38%	0
2013	100,700	0.37%	0

== See also ==
- LGBT rights in the Philippines
