= Danton Remoto =

Filipino writer (b.1963)

- Born: Danton Relato Remoto; March 25, 1963 (age 63); Floridablanca, Pampanga, Philippines
- Occupations: Essayist; writer; columnist; Field reporter
- Political party: Ladlad

Danton Relato Remoto (born March 25, 1963) is a Filipino writer, essayist, reporter, editor, columnist, and professor. Remoto received the first prize at the ASEAN Letter-Writing Contest for Young People. The award earned Remoto a scholarship at the Ateneo de Manila University in the Philippines. As a professor, Remoto taught English and Journalism at the Ateneo de Manila University. Remoto is the chairman emeritus of Ang Ladlad, a lesbian, gay, bisexual, transgender, and queer (LGBTQ) political party in the Philippines.

== Biography ==
Danton Relato Remoto was born in Basa Air Base, Floridablanca, Pampanga. His father, Francisco Sr., was a soldier while his mother, Lilia Relato, was a music teacher.

== Education ==
In 1983, Remoto obtained his AB in Interdisciplinary Studies from the Ateneo de Manila University. In 1989, while under the Robert Southwell scholarship, Remoto gained his MA degree in English Literature. In 1990, while under the British Council Fellowship, Remoto received his Master of Philosophy in Publishing Studies from the University of Stirling in Scotland. In 2000, Remoto was given the Fulbright Scholarship for Rutgers University in the United States. He also taught Freshman English Composition and Creative Writing: Fiction at Rutgers University. In 2003, Remoto obtained a fellowship from the Asian Scholarship Foundation at the Universiti Kebangsaan Malaysia (National University of Malaysia). In 2004, Remoto obtained a fellowship from the Asian Scholarship Foundation at the National University of Singapore. In March 2009, Remoto obtained a PhD in English Studies with a major in Creative Writing from the University of the Philippines Diliman. He also took an MFA in Creative Writing at the Graduate School of English at Miami University. He has attended the Bread Loaf Writers' Conference and the MacDowell Arts Residency as a fellow, as well as the Cambridge University Conference on Contemporary Writing held at Downing College.

== Career ==
From 1986, Remoto worked as a writer, reporter, editor, and columnist for the Philippine Press. In 1989, Remoto edited Alfredo Navarro Salanga's Buena Vista, a collection of poetry and fiction and was a co-editor of Gems in Philippine Literature. In 1994, Remoto became a Local Fellow for Poetry the UP Creative Writing Center. Together with J. Neil Garcia, Remoto edited the so-called Ladlad ("Out of the Closet") series, a succession of gay literature. He taught full-time at the Ateneo de Manila University from 1986 to 2009, and later worked as a Communications Analyst at the United Nations Development Programme and as Head of Research and News Desk Manager at TV5. At present, he currently serves as the news editor of The Manila Times, the country's oldest extant English language newspaper.

He appeared in Gloc-9's music video "Sirena", which depicts the life of a gay person who was maltreated by his father. The music video also featured Boy Abunda.

He also became a radio commentator during Radyo5's heyday until restructuring, and again in 2023 with his public service program, Pinoy Konek.

== Awards ==
Remoto was the recipient of several cultural and literary awards and recognition. In 1979, Remoto won the ASEAN prize for essay writing. In 1983, he won the Galian sa Arte at Tula award for poetry. In 1986, Remoto won the PLAC award for poetry. In 1987, Remoto won the Palanca Award for essay writing. He is a three-time Cultural Center of the Philippines (CCP) awardee for poetry. He won the Stirling District Arts Council Award for poetry and short story writing twice in 1989, and again in 1990. In 1993, Remoto became the Procyon Prize winner for poetry. He received the Cultural Center awards for film and video for the screenplay of the documentary House of the Crescent Moon and for the film The Last Parian. In 2004, Remoto obtained the Philippines Free Press Award for essay writing. In 2006, he became an awardee of the National Commission on Culture and the Arts Award for poetry translation. In 2007, Remoto was granted the Philippine Graphic magazine's Nick Joaquin Award for short story writing.

== Works ==
Remoto's writings include the following:

=== Poetry ===
- Skin, Voices, Faces (1991)
- Black Silk Pajamas / Poems in English and Filipino (1996)
- Pulotgata; The Love Poems (2004)
- Rain
- Padre Faura Witnesses The Execution of Rizal

=== Essays ===
- Seduction and Solitude
- X-Factor
- Gaydar
- Buhay Bading
- Rampa: Mga Sanaysay
- A Teacher's Tale

=== Books ===
- Ladlad
- Bright, Catholic and Gay
- Happy Na, Gay Pa
- Riverrun

== Filmography ==
- Tayuan mo at Panindigan! (AksyonTV, 2011–2012)
- Remoto Control (Radyo5 92.3 News FM, 2012–June 2017; Radio Pilipinas 1, Q3 2017–present)
- Pinoy Konek (92.3 Radyo5 True FM, 2023)
