= 1987 Palanca Awards =

Philippine literary award

37th Palanca Awards

The 37th Don Carlos Palanca Memorial Awards for Literature was held to commemorate the memory of Carlos Palanca through an endeavor that would promote education and culture in the country.

The 1987 winners were divided into twelve categories, open only to English and Filipino (Tagalog) novel, short story, poetry, essay, one-act play, and full-length play:

== English Division ==
=== Novel ===
- Grand Prize: Alfred A. Yuson, Great Philippine Jungle Energy Café

=== Short Story ===
- First Prize: Gregorio C. Brillantes, “The Flood in Tarlac”
- Second Prize: Jose Y. Dalisay Jr., “The Body”
- Third Prize: Charlson Ong, “Another Country”

Eli Ang Barroso, “The Bird Lover of City Hall”

=== Poetry ===
- First Prize: Lina Sagaral Reyes, “(Instead of a Will These) For All the Loved Ones”

Merlinda Bobis, “Peopleness”

- Second Prize: Constantino C. Tejero, “Enemigo Mortal”

Edgardo B. Maranan, “Hinterland”

- Third Prize: Ma. Fatima V. Lim, “The Quality of Light (Home Colors, Foreign Hues)”

Cesar Ruiz Aquino, “Word Without End”

=== Essay ===
- First Prize: Wilson Lee Flores, “The Legacy of the Old-Chinese Merchants of Manila”
- Second Prize: Danton R. Remoto, “Dislocation”
- Third Prize: Wilson Lee Flores, “Don Jose Ma. Basa, the Untold Saga of an Illustrado Patriot”

Wilson Lee Flores, “Gen. Macario Sakay and the Katagalugan Republic vs. the United States”

=== One-Act Play ===
- First Prize: Bobby Flores Villasis, “Fiesta”
- Second Prize: Ametta Suarez Taguchi, “Wish Afternoon in A Slum”
- Third Prize: Jose Y. Dalisay Jr., “In Transit”

=== Full-Length Play ===
- First Prize: Jessie B. Garcia, “Busman's Holiday”
- Second Prize: Elsa M. Coscolluela, “Song of the Sparrow”
- Third Prize: Mig Alvarez Enriquez, “Cachil Kudarat (Sultan of Mindanao) or Cachil Corrala”

== Filipino Division ==
=== Nobela ===
- Grand Prize: No Winner
- Special Mention: Cyrus P. Borja, Mga Aninong Hubad

Ramon V. Lim, Mga Limbas sa Lupa ng Muhammad

=== Maikling Kwento ===
- First Prize: Evelyn E. Sebastian, “Isang Pook, Dalawang Panahon”
- Second Prize: Cyrus P. Borja, “Batang Plantasyon”
- Third {rize: Fidel Rillo, Jr., “Talinhaga ng Talahib ng Los Indios Bravos”

=== Tula ===
- First Prize: Ruth Elynia S. Mabanglo, “Mga Liham ni Pinay at Iba Pang Tula”
- Second Prize: Edgardo B. Maranan, “Namulandayan”
- Third Prize: Aida Santos Maranan, “Bangungot ng Lungsod at Iba pang Tula”

=== Sanaysay ===
- First Prize: Isagani R. Cruz, “Lakas ng Libro/Lakas ng Tao: Pagdidiskonstrak sa Teksto ng Pebrero”
- Second Prize: Edgardo B. Maranan, “Bulkan, Bundok, Baha”
- Third Prize: Emmanuel Mario B Santos, “Malay”

=== Dulang May Isang Yugto ===
- First Prize: Ronaldo C. Tumbokon, “Kinang sa Uling”

Leoncio P. Deriada, “Mutya ng Saging”

- Second Prize: Aileen M. Aromin, “Agunya”

Rolando Dela Cruz and Rene O. Villanueva, “Asawa”

- Third Prize: Ronaldo L. Carcamo, “Pal”

=== Dulang Ganap ang Haba ===
- First Prize: Isagani R. Cruz, “Marissa”
- Second Prize: Rene O. Villanueva, “Awit ng Adarna”
- Third Prize: Jose C. Papa, “Salidumay: Awit sa Apoy”

== Sources ==
- "The Don Carlos Palanca Memorial Awards for Literature | Winners 1987". Archived from the original on 2009-10-22.
