= Falcis III v. Civil Registrar-General =

Civil rights case in the Philippines

- Court: Supreme Court of the Philippines en banc

Full case name
- Jesus Nicardo M. Falcis III v. Civil Registrar-General (Note: Petitioners-in-intervention: LGBTS Christian Church, Inc., Reverend Crescencio "Ceejay" Agbayani, Jr., Marlon Felipe, and Maria Arlyn "Sugar" Ibañez. Intervenors-oppositors: Attys. Fernando P. Perito, Ronaldo T. Reyes, Jeremy I. Gatdula, Cristina A. Montes, and Rufino Policarpio III)
- Decided: September 3, 2019
- Citation: 861 Phil. 388

Case history
- Prior action(s): None, Supreme Court was first instance

Questions presented
- Constitutionality of the portions of Article 1 and 2 of the Family Code of the Philippines, which defines marriage as between a man and a woman, and whether said articles violate the equal protection and due process provisions of the 1987 Constitution, (both in Article III, Section 1), and religious freedom (Article III, Section 5) of the petitioner.

Holding
- Ponente: Marvic Leonen, joined by Antonio Carpio, Presbitero Velasco Jr., Teresita Leonardo-De Castro, Lucas Bersamin, Mariano del Castillo, Estela Perlas Bernabe, Marvic Leonen, Samuel Martires, Noel Tijam, Andres Reyes Jr., Alexander Gesmundo
- The petition was dismissed for bringing no actual controversy. Falcis III found guilty of indirect contempt of court and ordered to pay a fine of ₱5,000 for hurting the case of his clients by not first filing a marriage petition on their behalf, which, when rejected, would have created an actual controversy.
- Concurrence: Francis Jardeleza, joined by Alfredo Benjamin Caguioa
- Concurrence: Diosdado Peralta

Laws applied
- 1987 Constitution, Article III; Civil Code of the Philippines (R.A. 386)

Keywords
- Same-sex marriage

Falcis III v. Civil Registrar-General, 861 Phil. 388 (2019), was a case which arose out of a petition filed by Filipino lawyer Jesus Falcis before the Supreme Court of the Philippines. The Court promulgated its ruling on September 3, 2019.

The high court was asked about the constitutionality of the provision of the Family Code of the Philippines defining marriage as "between a man and a woman".

== History ==
The petition was filed by lawyer Jesus Falcis in 2015.

=== Oral arguments ===
In March 2018, the Supreme Court of the Philippines approved the scheduling of a same-sex marriage petition that seeks to invalidate Articles 1 and 2 of the Family Code.

During the second week of June 2018, the Supreme Court announced that they will hear arguments in a case seeking the invalidation of the Family Code's provisions prohibiting same-sex marriage. The news of the historic oral arguments was also reported by the international media. Duterte also expressed his support for same-sex marriage to be legalized in the Philippines.

On June 19, 2018, oral arguments commenced with the following arguments made: whether or not the petition is properly the subject of the exercise of the Supreme Court's power of judicial review, whether or not the right to marry and the right to choose whom to marry are cognates of the right to life and liberty, whether or not the limitation of civil marriage to opposite-sex couples is a valid exercise of police power, whether or not limiting civil marriages to opposite-sex couples violates the Equal Protection Clause, whether or not denying same-sex couples the right to marry amounts to a denial of their right to life and/or liberty without due process of law, whether or not sex-based conceptions of marriage violate religious freedom, whether or not a determination that Articles 1 and 2 of the Family Code are unconstitutional must necessarily carry with it the conclusion that Articles 46(4) and 55(6) of the Family Code (i.e.: homosexuality and lesbianism as grounds for annulment and legal separation) are also unconstitutional, and whether or not the parties are entitled to the reliefs prayed for. The Office of the Solicitor General (OSG) under Jose Calida argued against the case. The second session of arguments took place on June 26, 2018.

Supreme Court justices queried Falcis III on what injury was inflicted on him due to the implementation of the Family Code but it was learned during the oral arguments that Falcis III was a single man did not apply for a marriage for himself which meant he was never denied one. Falcis III was told that his concern should have been raised in a lower court, particularly a regional trial court first.

=== Decision ===
The Supreme Court dismissed the petition on September 3, 2019, for "lack of standing" and for "failing to raise an actual, justiciable controversy" and stated that it could only base a decision on actual facts and "real adversarial presentations" noting that Falcis III cannot claim injury since he is not seeking marriage for himself or has presented an actual case. The high court however added that the 1987 Constitution in "plain text" imposes no restriction on same-sex marriage. The Supreme Court suggested in its ruling that Congress should address the issue.

The petitioners were also cited for indirect contempt with the high court reasoning that "[t]o forget [the bare rudiments of court procedure and decorum] – or worse, to purport to know them, but really, only to exploit them by way of propaganda – and then, to jump headlong into the taxing endeavor of constitutional litigation is a contemptuous betrayal of the high standards of the legal profession."

Falcis III described the decision as a "temporary setback" and has already considered the fact that oral arguments were held regarding his case as a victory "for the opportunity to educate the public" about the issue of same sex marriage in the country.

== Reaction ==
Two days after the first arguments occurred, the presidential palace of Philippine President Rodrigo Duterte stated that it was "too soon for same-sex marriage in the Philippines", causing outrage from various human rights organizations. Additionally, Senate President Tito Sotto, an ally of Duterte, commented: "Same sex union, no problem. Marriage? Debatable," saying that he will vote in favor of same-sex civil unions, a turnaround from previous pronouncements in 2016 and 2017 where he was against both same-sex civil unions and same-sex marriage.

Roman Catholic bishops praised the dismissal of the petition interpreting the high court's decision as a defense for the "sanctity of marriage".
