= Noel Tijam =

Filipino judge (born 1949)

The Honorable Noel Tijam
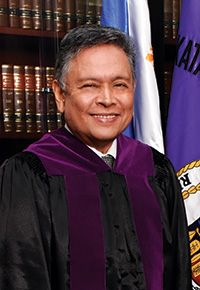

176th Associate Justice of the Supreme Court of the Philippines
- In office March 8, 2017 – January 5, 2019
- Appointed by: Rodrigo Duterte
- Preceded by: Arturo Brion
- Succeeded by: Amy Lazaro-Javier

Judge of the Court of Appeals of the Philippines
- In office March 10, 2003 – March 8, 2017
- Appointed by: Gloria Macapagal Arroyo

Member of the Judicial and Bar Council from the academe
- In office March 6, 2019 – July 9, 2022
- Appointed by: Rodrigo Duterte
- Preceded by: Jose Mejia
- Succeeded by: Nesauro Firme

Personal details
- Born: Noel Gimenez Tijam; January 5, 1949 (age 77) San Miguel, Manila
- Spouse: Maria Cynthia Cornejo Tijam
- Children: 3
- Education: San Beda College of Law
- Profession: Lawyer

Noel Gimenez Tijam (born January 5, 1949) is a Filipino lawyer who served as an associate justice of the Supreme Court of the Philippines from March 8, 2017 to January 5, 2019. Prior to his appointment, he was a justice of Court of Appeals from 2003 to 2017.

== Early life and education ==
Tijam was born on January 5, 1949, in San Miguel, Manila. He attended San Beda College where he obtained a degree in Bachelor of Arts, major in philosophy and political Science and graduated with magna cum laude honors in 1967. Under a full scholarship, he pursued Bachelor of Laws degree at the San Beda College of Law. He graduated with magna cum laude honors in 1971 from law school and was the salutatorian of his class. In the same year, he passed the Bar Examinations.

== Career ==
=== Legal career ===
At the Philippine Senate, Tijam served as legal consultant who represented Senator Victor Ziga at the Senate Blue Ribbon Committee, the Senate Economic Affairs Committee, Senate Committee on National Defense and Security, Senate Ways and Means Committee, and the Senate Committee on Ethics and Privileges.

Tijam worked with the Government Service Insurance System as its assistant vice president and Deputy Corporate Secretary and later with the Manila Hotel Corporation and the Westin Philippine Plaza as legal counsel and corporate secretary, and Comsavings Bank as board director.

He was appointed as the presiding judge of Branch 221 of Quezon City's Regional Trial Court (RTC) in 1994 and served as president of the Quezon City RTC Judges Association.

==== Court of Appeals ====
He was appointed Court of Appeals (CA) associate by then President Gloria Macapagal Arroyo in 2003 and served until 2017. Among the cases he handled was the Maguindanao massacre case where he penned a CA resolution in 2011 against former Maguindanao Governor Andal Ampatuan Sr. in the case's list of respondents. Ampatuan made a petition against two CA resolution that may possibly indict him for the massacre but was junked by the court. The court also affirmed Autonomous Region in Muslim Mindanao Governor Zaldy Ampatuan as one of the suspects in the case.

He also handled the case of Reynald Lim, the brother of Janet Lim-Napoles, the alleged mastermind of the Priority Development Assistance Fund scam. Lim and his sister faced charges serious illegal detention for detaining their cousin Benhur Luy which led to Napoles' conviction in 2015. Lim attempted to stop his indictment and recall an arrest warrant issued against him through a petition but the CA junked the appeal.

He authored the CA decision which upheld the closure of the bankrupt Banco Filipino.

==== Supreme Court ====
On March 8, 2017, President Rodrigo Duterte appointed Tijam as the 176th Associate Justice of the Supreme Court. He replaced Arturo Brion who retired on December 29, 2016.

On May 11, 2018, Tijam penned the main decision which removed Chief Justice Maria Lourdes Sereno from her post via a quo warranto petition.

In June 2018, Tijam penned the main decision which dismissed the Presidential Commission on Good Government (PCGG)'s complaint against the August 2010 Sandiganbayan decision dismissing the PCGG case against Imelda Marcos, Rodolfo Cuenca, et al., which had thrown out more than half of the documentary evidence presented by the PCGG because they were "mere photocopies."

=== As a lecturer ===
At age 20 while pursuing his law studies in San Beda, he is already working with the Philippine School of Business Administration as a lecturer. After becoming a lawyer, he worked with the Philippine Judicial Academy, Supreme Court where he is assigned to its Remedial Law Department as professorial lecturer. Under the Mandatory Continuing Legal Education Program, he taught in seminars organized by the academy, at the University of the Philippines Law Center, Integrated Bar of the Philippines, and numerous law firms.

President Rodrigo Duterte appointed him as a member of the Judicial and Bar Council (JBC) representing the academe in 2019. The JBC recommends to the president a shortlist on whom to appoint members of the judiciary.

== Awards ==
Tijam was named among the finalist for the most outstanding Regional Trial Court Judges Award in 1999 which is conferred by the Foundation for Judicial Excellence. The Philippine Jaycees gave him Most Outstanding JAYCEE Award and was the recipient of the Junior Chamber International Senatorship Award which was given to him in 1997.

== Personal life ==
Tijam is married to Maria Cynthia Cornejo Tijam, with whom he has three children.

Legal offices
Preceded by Arturo Brion	Associate Justice of the Supreme Court of the Philippines; March 8, 2017–January 5, 2019	Succeeded by Amy Lazaro-Javier
