= Amy Lazaro-Javier =

Former Associate Justice of the Supreme Court of the Philippines

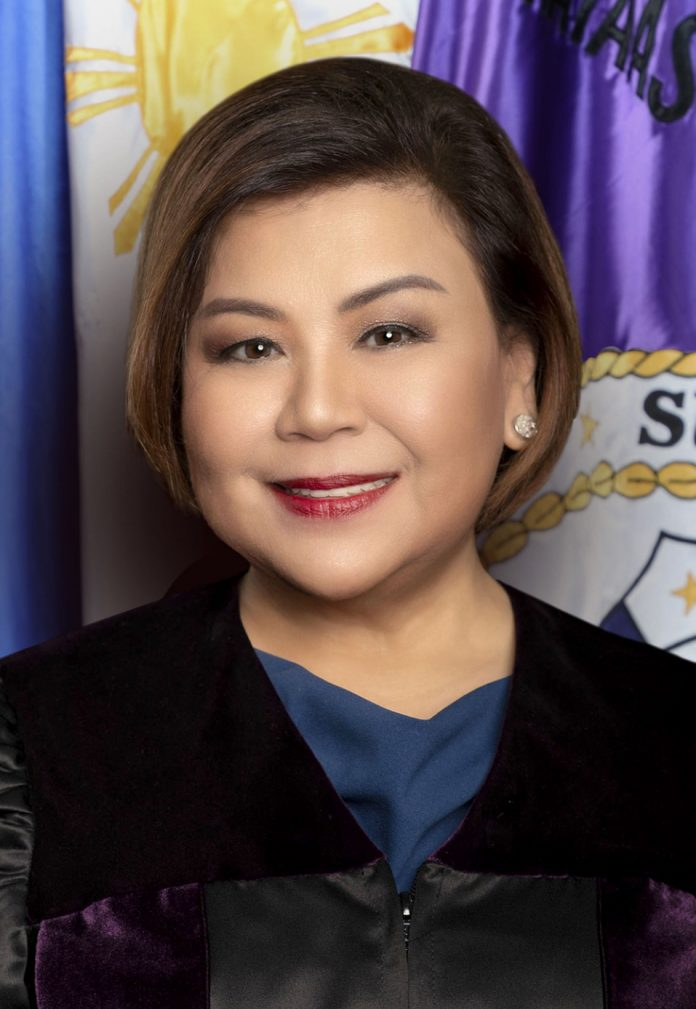
- Javier in December 2022

Associate Justice of the Supreme Court of the Philippines
- In office March 6, 2019 – November 16, 2026
- Appointed by: Rodrigo Duterte
- Preceded by: Noel Tijam
- Succeeded by: Gamaliel Cordoba

Justice of the Court of Appeals of the Philippines
- In office August 29, 2007 – March 6, 2019
- Appointed by: Gloria Macapagal Arroyo
- Preceded by: Renato Dacudao
- Succeeded by: Richard Mordeno

Personal details
- Born: Amy Carillo Lazaro; November 16, 1956 (age 70) Manila, Philippines
- Education: Philippine Normal College (BS); University of Santo Tomas (LLB)

Amy Lazaro-Javier (born Amy Carillo Lazaro; November 16, 1956) is a Filipino judge who has served as an associate justice of the Supreme Court of the Philippines from 2019 to 2026. She was appointed by President Rodrigo Duterte to succeed Noel Tijam.

== Life and career ==
Lazaro-Javier graduated magna cum laude from the Philippine Normal College in 1977 with a Bachelor of Science in education. She received her law degree from the University of Santo Tomas. She graduated valedictorian in 1982.

She joined the Office of the Solicitor General in 1983 as trial attorney, and later became Assistant Solicitor General in 1994.

She was appointed to the Court of Appeals of the Philippines on August 29, 2007.

== Associate Justice of the Supreme Court ==
In June 2017, Lazaro-Javier was under consideration to replace Associate Justice Bienvenido Reyes. Again in June 2018, Lazaro-Javier was under consideration to replace Presbitero J. Velasco Jr. On December 7, 2018, her name was once again submitted for a vacancy left by the retirement of Noel Tijam, and was finally appointed. She took her oath of office on March 6, 2019. She retired as associate justice on November 16, 2026 upon reaching the mandatory age retirement of 70.

Legal offices
Preceded by Noel Tijam	Associate Justice of the Supreme Court of the Philippines; 2019–present	Incumbent
