= J. Neil Garcia =

Philippines Professor of English, creative writer

J. Neil C. Garcia
- Education: University of Santo Tomas (BA); University of the Philippines Diliman (MA, PhD)
- Occupation(s): Professor, writer, poet, cultural critic

J. Neil Carmelo Garcia is a Filipino writer, professor, and cultural critic. He is currently a professor of English, Creative Writing, and Comparative Literature at the University of the Philippines Diliman and is known for his works on queer studies and gay culture in the Philippines.

== Education ==
Garcia earned a Bachelor of Arts in Journalism from the University of Santo Tomas in 1990, graduating magna cum laude. He then earned a Master of Arts in Comparative literature in 1995 and a Doctor of Philosophy in English Studies: Creative Writing in 2003 from the University of the Philippines Diliman.

== Writing career ==
Garcia has authored several poetry collections and works in literary and cultural criticism.

In 1996, Garcia was the recipient of a Philippine National Book Award, winning Best in Literary Criticism for his work on Philippine Gay Culture: The Last Thirty Years (1996).

He is currently a professor of English, Creative Writing and Comparative Literature at the College of Arts and Letters at the University of the Philippines Diliman, where he also serves as a fellow for poetry of Likhaan, also known as the UP Institute of Creative Writing. He has also previously served as the director of the University of the Philippines Press.

== Personal life ==
Garcia is gay.

== Works ==
=== Poetry ===
- Closet Quivers, 1992
- Our Lady of the Carnival, 1996
- Sorrows of Water, 2000;
- Kaluluwa: New and Selected Poems, 2001
- The Garden of Wordlessness, 2005
- Misterios and Other Poems, 2005

=== Cultural Criticism ===
- Philippine Gay Culture: The Last Thirty Years, 1996
- Slip/pages: Essays in Philippine Gay Criticism, 1998
- Postcolonialism and Filipino Poetics: Essays and Critiques, 2004

=== Creative Non-Fiction ===
- Closet Queeries, 1997
- Myths and Metaphors, 2002
- Performing the Self: Occasional Prose, 2003

=== Anthologies (as editor) ===
- Ladlad, 1994;
- Ladlad 2, 1996;
- The Likhaan Book of Philippine Criticism, 1992–1997
- The Likhaan Book of Poetry and Fiction, 1998 & 2000
- Bongga Ka 'Day: Gay Quotes to Live by, 2002
- Ladlad 3, 2007

=== Honors and awards ===
- British Council Fellowship Grant to Cambridge
- British Academy Fellowship
- Taipei International Artist-in-Residence
- Visiting ICOPHIL Fellow at the International Institute of Asian Studies, Leiden, the Netherlands
- Procyon Poetry Prize
- National Book Awards from the Manila Critics Circle
- Palanca Awards for Literature
- Philippines Free Press Literary Awards for Poetry
- U.P. Gawad Chancellor for Outstanding Literary Artist,
- U.P. Gawad Chancellor for Outstanding Literary Work,
- U.P. Gawad Chancellor for Outstanding Research
- U.P. Gawad Chancellor as Artist of the Year
- Outstanding Thomasian Writers Award
- 29th National Writers' Workshop, Dumaguete
- U.P. National Writers' Workshop
