= Bar topnotchers in the Philippines =

Bar topnotchers in the Philippines are bar examinees who garnered the highest bar exam grades in a particular year. Every year, the Supreme Court releases the bar top ten list. The list contains the names of bar examinees who obtained the ten highest grades. It is possible for more than ten examinees to place in the top ten because numerical ties in the computation of grades usually occur.

== Overview ==
From 1913 to 2025, schools which have produced bar topnotchers (1st placers) are as follows:

Number of Bar Topnotchers
Law School	No. of Bar Topnotchers
University of the Philippines College of Law	52
Ateneo de Manila Law School	23
San Beda College of Law	8
University of Santo Tomas Faculty of Civil Law	6
Philippine Law School	5
Far Eastern University Institute of Law	4
University of Manila College of Law	4
San Beda College Alabang School of Law	3
University of the Cordilleras College of Law	2
Other Law Schools	1

Two bar examinees topped the bar exams without officially graduating from any Philippine law school:

- Jose W. Diokno – former Senator of the Philippines; 1st placer, 1945 bar exams. Diokno Sr., who tied for Number One with former Senate President Jovito Salonga in the 1945 Bar Exams, would have graduated from the University of Santo Tomas had not World War II supervened. Mr. Diokno's success in the bar exams is further underscored by the fact that he was also under-age and that he also placed number 1 in the 1940 CPA Board exams which he took while in law school, summa cum laude after graduating from then De La Salle College at the age of 17. This double number 1 feat may never be paralleled. The closest may have been Cesar L. Villanueva (from the Ateneo Law School) who placed second in the 1981 Bar Exams and sixth place in the 1982 CPA Board Exams and Reginald Laco (from the De La Salle Lipa Law School) who placed fourth in the 2015 Bar Exams and second in the 2009 CPA Board Exams.
- Carolina C. Griño-Aquino – former Associate Justice of the Supreme Court; 1st placer, 1950 bar exams. Ms. Aquino (who later became the wife of Mr. Ramon Aquino, 6th placer in 1939 Bar Exams) was a special student of the UP College of Law, where she finished her last two years of law school having taken her first two years of law school at the Colegio de San Agustin in Iloilo. Ms. Aquino was advised to take her last two years of law school in UP by Colegio de San Agustin Law Dean Felipe Ysmael. Coincidentally, Mr. Ysmael (a UP Law graduate himself) placed number 1 in the 1917 Bar Exams. Since Ms. Aquino only took her last two years of law at UP, she can't be certified as an official UP law graduate. Both spouses Aquino (in addition to being topnotchers) also served as Justices of the Supreme Court.

In the past, non-law school graduates were allowed to take the bar. However, the Revised Rules of Court and Supreme Court Circulars allow Filipino graduates of Philippine law schools (and subject to certain conditions, Filipino graduates of foreign law schools) to take the bar, necessarily excluding non-law graduates and foreigners who have law degrees from taking part in the exercise.

While not a guarantee for topping the bar, academic excellence in law school is a good indicator of an examinee's fortune in the bar exams. Ateneo Law School's only summa cum laude graduate, Claudio Teehankee, placed number one in the 1940 Bar Exams. It is worth noting that Teehankee's son, Manny Teehankee, followed in his footsteps by graduating at the top of his Ateneo Law School class (albeit, not as summa cum laude) and placing first in the 1983 bar exams. Claudio's nephew, Enrique (a cum laude graduate from the UP College of Law), also placed number one in the 1976 bar exams. Claudio eventually became Supreme Court Chief Justice, Manuel was formerly Department of Justice Undersecretary and Ambassador and Permanent Representative to the World Trade Organization in Geneva, Switzerland while Enrique is a successful private practitioner.

This father-son-nephew feat has yet to (and, perhaps, may never) be equalled in the annals of Philippine Bar. For siblings, the closest is when Manuel B. Zamora, Jr. placed third in the 1961 Bar Exams and younger brother Ronaldo placed first in the 1969 Bar Exams.

The UST Faculty of Civil Law's sole summa cum laude graduate, Roberto B. Concepcion, placed first in the 1924 Bar Exams. He later served as Chief Justice of the Supreme Court.

The San Beda College of Law's sole magna cum laude graduate, Florenz Regalado, ranked 1st in the 1954 Bar exams with a mark of 96.70%. The record is the highest average in the Philippine Bar Examinations, to date. Regalado later served as an Associate Justice of the Supreme Court.

The UP College of Law (which has yet to produce a summa cum laude graduate) had five of its seventeen magna cum laude graduates (the College of Law first conferred the honor to Rafael Dinglasan in 1925 and, to date, last conferred the same honor to Dionne Marie Sanchez in 2007) place number one in their respective bar exams: Rafael Dinglasan in 1925, Lorenzo Sumulong in 1929, Deogracias Eufemio in 1962, Roberto San Jose in 1966 and Ronaldo Zamora in 1969. Dinglasan became a Judge of the Court of First Instance of Manila; Sumulong became Senator of the Republic and a renowned statesman; Eufemio became a known corporate lawyer appearing in court; while San Jose established his successful private law firm Castillo, Laman, Tan, Pantaleon & San Jose. Zamora became Executive Secretary to then President Joseph Estrada and Minority Leader in the House of Representatives.

== Bar Topnotchers list ==
The Office of the Bar Confidant releases an official Bar Topnotchers list together with the list of names of all successful bar examinees. The Bar Topnotchers list contains the names of the candidates who garnered the highest general averages in the bar exam for that year. The highest ranking candidate in the list is known as the bar topnotcher. The list has always been the subject of much media attention and public speculation.

Making a place in the list is widely regarded as an important life achievement, an attractive professional qualification, and a necessary improvement in a lawyer's professional and social status.

Below is a listing of all 106 first-placers since the Supreme Court publicly released the list of topnotchers (from 1913 to 2019 and from 2022 onwards) and can be rearranged from highest to lowest in terms of rating obtained. Bar ratings are not exactly comparable from year-to-year as the difficulty of the exams varies through the years. Two bar examinations took place in 1946, first in August to cover the absence of the examination the previous year and in November for the present year. The same happened in 2022 to represent 2020-21 and 2022 later that year. There was a tie in first place in two occasions – in 1944 and in 1999.

Year	Name	Average	School	Hometown	Passing Percentage
1901					
1902					
1903	Jose L. Quintos	96.33	Escuela de Derecho/Manila Law College	Baliwag, Bulacan	30.76% (4 out of 13)
1904					
1905					
1906					
1907					
1908					
1909					
1910					
1911	Jose Hontiveros	99.69	University of Santo Tomas	Tangalan, Capiz	
1912					
1913	Manuel A. Roxas	92	University of the Philippines	Roxas City, Capiz	
1914	Manuel C. Goyena	93	University of the Philippines	Manila, Metro Manila	
1915	Francisco Villanueva, Jr.	90	University of the Philippines	Manila, Metro Manila	
1916	Paulino Gullas	93	University of the Philippines	Cebu City, Cebu	
1917	Felipe Ysmael	92	University of the Philippines	Iloilo City, Iloilo	
1918	Alejo Labrador	87	University of the Philippines	San Narciso, Zambales	
1919	Gregorio Anonas	87	Philippine Law School	Iba, Zambales	
1920	Adolfo Brillantes	84.1	Escuela de Derecho/ Manila Law College	Bangued, Abra	
1921	Pablo C. Payawal	89.1	University of the Philippines	San Miguel, Bulacan	
1922	Amando L. Velilla	89.1	University of the Philippines	Balasan, Iloilo	
1923	Roque V. Desquitado	90.9	University of the Philippines	Bantayan, Cebu	
1924	Roberto R. Concepcion	89.1	University of Santo Tomas	Manila, Metro Manila	
1925	Rafael Dinglasan	91.1	University of the Philippines	Roxas City, Capiz	
1926	Eugeniano Perez	88.1	Philippine Law School	Mandaue, Cebu	
1927	Cesar Kintanar	87.7	University of the Philippines	Argao, Cebu	
1928	Filomeno Karl B. Pascual	90.3	Philippine Law School	Sagay, Negros Occidental	
1929	Lorenzo S. Sumulong	92.5	University of the Philippines	Antipolo, Rizal	
1930	Tecla San Andres	89.4	University of the Philippines	Naga, Camarines Sur	
1931	Jose N. Leuterio	89.4	University of Ilocos Sur	Boac, Marinduque	
1932	Hermenegildo Atienza	93	University of the Philippines	Manila, Metro Manila	
1933	Lope C. Quimbo	92.45	University of Manila	Calbiga, Samar	
1934	Marciano P. Catral	89.7	Philippine Law School	Luna, Isabela	
1935	Enrique Estrellado	91.7	University of the Philippines	San Pablo, Laguna	
1936	Diosdado P. Macapagal	89.85	University of Santo Tomas	Lubao, Pampanga	
1937	Cecilia Muñoz-Palma	92.6	University of the Philippines	Bauan, Batangas	
1938	Emmanuel Pelaez	91.3	University of Manila	Medina, Misamis Oriental	
1939	Ferdinand Marcos	92.35	University of the Philippines	Batac, Ilocos Norte	
1940	Claudio Teehankee	94.35	Ateneo de Manila University	Manila, Metro Manila	
1941	Emmet P.D. Shea	90.2	University of the Philippines	Manila, Metro Manila	
1942-1943		Cancelled due to World War II			
1944	Jovito R. Salonga	95.3	University of the Philippines	Pasig, Metro Manila	
1944	Jose W. Diokno	95.3	Special Dispensation (non-degree holder) (University of Santo Tomas undergraduate)	Manila, Metro Manila	
1945		Cancelled due to Post-war Rehabilitation			
1946	Gregoria T. Cruz – (August 1946)	92.25	University of the Philippines	Manila, Metro Manila	46.63% (97 out of 208)
1946	Pedro L. Yap – (November 1946)	91.7	University of the Philippines	San Isidro, Leyte	56.69% (271 out of 478)
1947	Ameurfina A. Melencio-Herrera	93.85	University of the Philippines	Manila, Metro Manila	59.87% (428 out of 755)
1948	Manuel G. Montecillo	95.5	Far Eastern University	Liliw, Laguna	62.26% (561 out of 901)
1949	Anacleto C. Mañgaser	95.85	Philippine Law School	Caba, La Union	56.14% (686 out of 1,222)
1950	Carolina C. Griño	92.05	Special (Colegio de San Agustin and University of the Philippines)	Leganes, Iloilo	31.92% (423 out of 1,325)
1951	Vicente R. Acsay	92.25	University of Manila	Bugasong, Antique	57.19% (1.189 out of 2,079)
1952	Pedro Samson C. Animas	94.25	University of the Philippines	Ozamiz, Misamis Occidental	62.02% (1,705 out of 2,749)
1953	Leonardo A. Amores	94.05	University of Manila	Roxas City, Capiz	72.42% (1,851 out of 2,556)
1954	Florenz D. Regalado	96.7	San Beda College	Concepcion, Iloilo	75.17% (2,409 out of 3,206)
1955	Tomas P. Matic, Jr.	90.55	Far Eastern University	Concepcion, Tarlac	27.29% (815 out of 2,987)
1956	Francisco C. Catral	90.2	San Beda College	Lal-lo, Cagayan	62.60% (2,283 out of 3,647)
1957	Gregorio R. Castillo	89.15	University of the Philippines	Buhi, Camarines Sur	19.77% (615 out of 3,110)
1958	Manuel G. Abello	89.25	University of the Philippines	Isabela, Negros Occidental	21.97% (868 out of 3,951)
1959	Agustin O. Benitez	89.2	Far Eastern University	Cabadbaran, Agusan del Norte	21.21% (796 out of 3,754)
1960	Ismael Andres	91.7	Manuel L. Quezon University	Looc, Romblon	39.9% (1,667 out of 4,178)
1961	Avelino V. Cruz	90.95	San Beda College	Pasig, Metro Manila	19.34 (845 out of 4,370)
1962	Deogracias G. Eufemio	90.8	University of the Philippines	Manila, Metro Manila	19.4% (899 out of 4,635)
1963	Cornelio C. Gison	86.35	Ateneo de Manila University	Arevalo, Iloilo City	22.26% (1,213 out of 5,453)
1964	Jesus P. Castelo	88.4	San Beda College	San Isidro, Nueva Ecija	25.09% (902 out of 3,596)
1965	Victor S. de la Serna	89.8	San Beda College	Tagbilaran, Bohol	32.66% (642 out of 1,965)
1966	Roberto V. San Jose	90.6	University of the Philippines	Manila, Metro Manila	36.71% (715 out of 1,947)
1967	Rodolfo D. Robles	89.6	San Beda College	Tiaong, Quezon	22.8% (411 out of 1,803)
1968	Oscar B. Glovasa	87.45	Divine Word College of Tagbilaran	Cogon, Tagbilaran, Bohol	21.11% (347 out of 1,643)
1969	Ronaldo B. Zamora	87.3	University of the Philippines	Metro Manila	28.6 (495 out of 1,731)
1970	Romulo D. San Juan	87.5	Far Eastern University	San Jacinto, Masbate	27.9% (491 out of 1,761)
1971	Henry R. Villarica	92.4	University of the Philippines	Meycauayan, Bulacan	33.84% (621 out of 1,835)
1972	Januario B. Soller, Jr.	87.13	Ateneo de Manila University	Manila, Metro Manila	26.68% (509 out of 1,907)
1973	Vicente R. Solis	90.3	Ateneo de Manila University	Zamboanga City, Zamboanga del Sur	37.4% (610 out of 1,631)
1974	Arturo D. Brion	91.65	Ateneo de Manila University	San Pablo, Laguna	35.02% (685 out of 1,956)
1975	Nicanor B. Padilla, Jr.	86.7	University of the East	Cebu City, Cebu	35.18% (686 out of 1,950)
1976	Enrique Y. Teehankee	90.8	University of the Philippines	Manila, Metro Manila	49.77% (926 out of 1,979)
1977	Virgilio B. Gesmundo	91.8	Ateneo de Manila University	San Pablo, Laguna	60.56% (1,038 out of 1,714)
1978	Cosme D. Rosell	92.475	University of the Philippines	Daanbantayan, Cebu	56.93% (1,076 out of 1,890)
1979	Gregorio M. Batiller, Jr.	91.4	Ateneo de Manila University	Davao City, Davao del Sur	49.51% (903 out of 1,824)
1980	Rafael R. Lagos	89.75	University of the Philippines	Manila, Metro Manila	33.61% (605 out of 1,800)
1981	Irene Ragodon-Guevarra	90.95	Ateneo de Manila University	Manila, Metro Manila	43.71% (787 out of 1,800)
1982	Ray C. Espinosa	90.95	Ateneo de Manila University	Manila, Metro Manila	20.5% (432 out of 2,112)
1983	Manuel Antonio J. Teehankee	91.4	Ateneo de Manila University	Manila, Metro Manila	21.3% (523 out of 2,455)
1984	Richard M. Chiu	92.85	Ateneo de Manila University	Dumaguete, Negros Oriental	25.55% (638 out of 2,497)
1985	Janette Susan L. Peña	89.4	University of the Philippines	San Juan, Metro Manila	25.78% (701 out of 2,719)
1986	Laurence L. Go	88.6	Ateneo de Manila University	Pagadian, Zamboanga del Sur	18.88% (493 out of 2,609)
1987	Mario P. Victoriano	88.55	Ateneo de Manila University	Dumaguete, Negros Oriental	17.90 (480 out of 2,682)
1988	Maria Yvette O. Navarro	88.12	University of the Philippines	Manila, Metro Manila	24.40% (689 out of 2,824)
1989	Gilberto Eduardo Gerardo C. Teodoro, Jr.	86.185	University of the Philippines	Manila, Metro Manila	21.26% (639 out of 3,006)
1990	Aquilino L. Pimentel III	89.85	University of the Philippines	Cagayan de Oro	27.94% (866 out of 3,100)
1991	Joseph P. San Pedro	89.95	Ateneo de Manila University	Malolos, Bulacan	17.81% (569 out of 3,194)
1992	Jayme A. Sy, Jr.	87	Ateneo de Manila University	Sagay, Negros Occidental	17.25% (499 out of 2,892)
1993	Anna Leah Fidelis T. Castañeda	88.325	Ateneo de Manila University	Manila, Metro Manila	21.65% (725 out of 3,348)
1994	Francisco Noel R. Fernandez	89.2	University of the Philippines	Butuan, Agusan del Norte	30.87% (1,030 out of 3,337)
1995	Leonor Y. Dicdican	91.2	University of the Philippines	Davao City, Davao del Sur	30.90% (987 out of 3,194)
1996	Patricia-Ann T. Prodigalidad	90.6	University of the Philippines	Brooklyn, New York, US	31.21% (1,217 out of 3,900)
1997	Ma. Cecilia H. Fernandez	90.025	University of the Philippines	Makati, Metro Manila	18.11% (710 out of 3,921)
1998	Janet B. Abuel	91.8	Baguio Colleges Foundation	Dagupan, Pangasinan	39.63% (1,465 out of 3,697)
1999	Edwin R. Enrile	88.5	Ateneo de Manila University	Naga, Camarines Sur	16.59% (660 out of 3,978)
1999	Florin T. Hilbay	88.5	University of the Philippines	Manila, Metro Manila	16.59% (660 out of 3,978)
2000	Eliseo M. Zuñiga, Jr.	90.6	University of the Philippines	Mandaluyong, Metro Manila	20.84% (979 out of 4,698)
2001	Rodolfo Ma. A. Ponferrada	93.8	University of the Philippines	Quezon City, Metro Manila	32.895 (1,266 out of 3,849)
2002	Arlene M. Maneja	92.9	University of Santo Tomas	Quezon City, Metro Manila	19.86% (917 out of 4,659)
2003	Aeneas Eli S. Diaz	88.53	Ateneo de Manila University	Sorsogon City, Sorsogon	20.71% (1,108 out of 5,349)
2004	January A. Sanchez	87.45	University of the Philippines	Santa Maria, Bulacan	31.61% (1,659 out of 5,249)
2005	Joan A. De Venecia	87.2	University of the Philippines	Dagupan, Pangasinan	27.22% (1,526 out of 5,607)
2006	Noel Neil Q. Malimban	87.6	University of the Cordilleras	Baguio, Benguet	30.6% (1,893 out of 6,187)
2007	Mercedita L. Ona	83.55	Ateneo de Manila University	San Jose, Batangas	22. 91% (1,289 out of 5,626)
2008	Judy A. Lardizabal	85.7	San Sebastian College	Imus, Cavite	20.58 (1,310 out of 6,364)
2009	Reinier Paul R. Yebra	84.8	San Beda College	Daet, Camarines Norte	24.58% (1,451 out of 5,093)
2010	Cesareo Antonio S. Singzon Jr.	89	Ateneo de Manila University	Catbalogan, Samar	20.26% (982 out of 4,847)
2011	Raoul Angelo D. Atadero	85.536	Ateneo de Manila University	Quezon City, Metro Manila	31.95% (1,913 out of 5,987)
2012	Ignatius Michael D. Ingles	85.64	Ateneo de Manila University	Quezon City, Metro Manila	17.76% (949 out of 5,343)
2013	Nielson G. Pangan	85.8	University of the Philippines	Manila, Metro Manila	22.18% (1,174 out of 5,293)
2014	Irene Mae B. Alcobilla	85.5	San Beda College	San Remigio, Antique	18.82% (1,126 out of 5,984)
2015	Rachel Angeli B. Miranda	87.4	University of the Philippines	Quezon City, Metro Manila	26.21% (1,731 out of 7,146)
2016	Karen Mae L. Calam	89.05	University of San Carlos	Kalilangan, Bukidnon	59.06% (3,747 out of 6,344)
2017	Mark John M. Simondo	91.05	University of St. La Salle	Bacolod, Negros Occidental	25.55% (1,724 out of 6,748)
2018	Sean James Borja	89.306	Ateneo de Manila University	Muntinlupa, Metro Manila	22.07% (1,800 out of 8,155)
2019	Mae Diane Azores	91.049	University of Santo Tomas–Legazpi	Legazpi City, Albay	27.36% (2,103 out of 7,699)
2020	Postponed due to the COVID-19 pandemic				
2021^{1}	None ^{2}				72.28% (8,241 out of 11,402)
2022	Czar Matthew Dayday	88.803	University of the Philippines	Quezon City, Metro Manila	43.47% (3,992 out of 9,183)
2023	Ephraim P. Bie	89.2625	University of Santo Tomas	Metro Manila	36.77% (3,812 out of 10,387)
2024	Kyle Christian G. Tutor	85.77	University of the Philippines	Lapu-Lapu City, Cebu	37.84% (3,962 out of 10,490)
2025	Jhenroniel Rhey T. Sanchez	92.70	University of the Philippines	Calamba, Laguna	48.96% (5,594 out of 11,425)

^1 Due to the ongoing COVID-19 pandemic, the Supreme Court En banc instituted bar reforms pro hac vice in conducting the 2020-2021 bar examinations, including:

- Digitization and regionalization of the bar examinations.
- Postponement of the bar examination to February 4, 2022, and February 6, 2022.
- Reduction of Bar Coverage to 4 subjects - Laws pertaining to the State and Its relationship with its Citizens (formerly Political Law, Labor Law, and Taxation Law); Criminal Law; Law pertaining to Private Personal and Commercial Relations (formerly Civil Law and Commercial law); and Procedure and Professional Ethics (formerly Remedial Law, Legal Ethics and Practical Exercises).
- Requirement of negative results for Antigen test and confirmatory RT-PCR test.

^2 Declaration of bar topnotchers is suspended. Examinees who obtain 85% or higher shall be recognized for exemplary performance.

=== Highest and lowest topnotcher grades ===
A standard was created in 1940, when Claudio Teehankee (future Supreme Court Chief Justice), from the Ateneo Law School, got a grade of 94.35% when he topped the examinations. This record was obliterated four years later in 1944 when Jovito Salonga and Jose W. Diokno tied with the highest score of 95.3%. This was the first time that first place ended in a tie. When they took the 1944 Bar Exams, Atty. Salonga was an undergraduate at the UP College of Law while Atty. Diokno (future Senator) was an undergraduate of the University of Santo Tomas Faculty of Civil Law. After passing the bar, Atty. Salonga (future Senate President) went back to UP to complete his bachelor's degree in law, earning it in 1946. The only other instance of a tie at the first place in the bar exams was when Edwin Enrile (salutatorian of his Ateneo Law School class) and Florin Hilbay (an honor student of the UP College of Law) both garnered the same score in 1999. Atty. Enrile served as Deputy Executive Secretary to President Gloria Arroyo and as a Professorial Lecturer at the Ateneo Law School. Atty. Hilbay served as the Solicitor General from 2014 to 2016 and is the former dean of the Siliman University College of Law. After another four years, the "bar" was raised a few notches when Manuel G. Montecillo of the Far Eastern University Institute of Law got a grade of 95.50% when he bested all the bar examinees of 1948. The following year, another record was set when Anacleto C. Mañgaser, an alumnus of the Philippine Law School, got a grade of 95.85% when he topped the 1949 bar exams.

The lowest grade was obtained by Ateneo Law School's Mercedita L. Ona, 83.55%, 2007, which erased the prior record of 84.10%, obtained by Adolfo Brillantes of Escuela de Derecho de Manila (now Manila Law College Foundation) in 1920. Atty. Ona was just the latest of women's first placers. In 1930, Tecla San Andres (an alumna of the UP College of Law and future Senator) broke the proverbial "glass ceiling" when she became the first woman to top the bar with a grade of 89.4%. Ameurfina A. Melencio (also an alumna of the UP College of Law and who later became a Justice of the Supreme Court) has the highest grade of all-female bar topnotchers in recorded history when she obtained a 93.85% rating in 1947.

== Notable bar topnotchers ==
Prominent lawyers who made the bar top ten include:

=== Presidents and vice-presidents ===
- Manuel A. Roxas – fifth president of the Philippines; 1st placer (92%), 1913 Bar Exams (UP)
- Diosdado P. Macapagal – ninth president of the Philippines; 1st placer (89.85%), 1936 Bar Exams (UST)
- Ferdinand E. Marcos – tenth president of the Philippines; 1st placer (92.35%), 1939 Bar Exams (UP)
- José P. Laurel – third president of the Philippines; 2nd placer, 1915 Bar Exams (UP)
- Elpidio R. Quirino – sixth President of the Philippines; 2nd placer, 1915 Bar Exams (UP)
- Sergio Osmeña – fifth president of the Philippines; 2nd placer, 1903 Bar Exams (UST)
- Manuel L. Quezon – second president of the Philippines; 4th placer, 1903 Bar Exams (UST)
- Carlos P. García – eighth president of the Philippines; 7th placer, 1923 Bar Exams (PLS)
- Emmanuel N. Pelaez – sixth Vice-President of the Philippines; 1st placer, 1938 Bar Exams (UM)
- Arturo M. Tolentino – former vice president of the Philippines; 2nd placer, 1934 Bar Exams (UP)

=== Supreme Court and Court of Appeals justices ===
- Jose Hontiveros - Associate Justice of the First Supreme Court; Associate Justice of the Court of Appeals; 1st placer, 1911 Bar Exams (University of Santo Tomas)
- José Yulo – 6th Philippine Chief Justice; 3rd placer, 1913 Bar Exams (UP College of Law)
- Ricardo Paras – 8th Philippine Chief Justice; 2nd placer, 1913 Bar Exams (UP College of Law)
- César Bengzon – 9th Philippine Chief Justice; 2nd placer, 1919 Bar Exams (UP College of Law)
- Roberto Concepcion – 10th Philippine Chief Justice; 1st placer, 1924 Bar Exams (UST Faculty of Civil Law)
- Querube Makalintal – 11th Philippine Chief Justice; 7th placer, 1933 Bar Exams (UP College of Law)
- Ramon Aquino – 15th Philippine Chief Justice; 9th placer, 1939 Bar Exams (UP College of Law)
- Claudio Teehankee – 16th Philippine Chief Justice; 1st placer, 1940 Bar Exams (Ateneo Law School)
- Pedro Yap – 17th Philippine Chief Justice; 1st placer, 1946 Bar Exams (UP College of Law)
- Andres Narvasa – 19th Philippine Chief Justice; 2nd placer, 1951 Bar Exams (UST Faculty of Civil Law)
- Artemio Panganiban – 21st Philippine Chief Justice; 6th placer, 1960 Bar Exams (FEU Institute of Law)
- José P. Laurel – former Philippine Supreme Court Justice; 2nd placer, 1915 Bar Exams
- J. B. L. Reyes – former Philippine Supreme Court Justice; 6th placer, 1922 Bar Exams
- Ambrosio Padilla – former Philippine Supreme Court Justice; 3rd placer, 1934 Bar Exams
- Cecilia Muñoz-Palma – former Philippine Supreme Court Justice; 1st placer, 1937 Bar Exams
- Ameurfina Melencio-Herrera – former Philippine Supreme Court Justice; 1st placer, 1947 Bar Exams
- Irene Cortes – former Philippine Supreme Court Justice; 9th placer, 1948 Bar Exams
- Carolina C. Griño-Aquino – former Philippine Supreme Court Justice; 1st placer, 1950 Bar Exams
- Isagani R. Cruz – former Philippine Supreme Court Justice; 8th placer, 1951 Bar Exams
- Florenz Regalado – former Philippine Supreme Court Justice; 1st placer, 1954 Bar Exams
- Adolfo Azcuna – Philippine Supreme Court Justice; 4th placer, 1962 Bar Exams
- Antonio Eduardo Nachura – Philippine Supreme Court Justice; 7th placer, 1967 Bar Exams
- Presbitero Velasco, Jr. – Philippine Supreme Court Justice; 6th placer, 1971 Bar Exams
- Antonio Carpio – Philippine Supreme Court Justice; 6th placer, 1975 Bar Exams
- Arturo D. Brion – Philippine Supreme Court Justice; former Philippine Court of Appeals Justice; 1st placer, 1974 Bar Exams
- Lucas Bersamin – 25th Philippine Chief Justice; 9th placer, 1973 Bar Exams
- Francis Jardeleza- 173rd Supreme Court Associate Justice and former Solicitor General; 3rd placer, 1974 Bar Exams
- Rafael C. Climaco- former Philippine Court of Appeals Justice; 5th placer, 1939 Bar Exams
- Celso L. Magsino - former Philippine Court of Appeals Justice; 4th placer, 1949 Bar Exams

=== Senators ===
- Jose Hontiveros - former Philippine Senator; 1st placer, 1911 Bar Exams
- Manuel A. Roxas – former Philippine Senate President and Speaker of the House of Representatives; 1st placer, 1913 Bar Exams
- Manuel L. Quezon – former Philippine Senate President; 4th placer, 1903 Bar Exams
- Cipriano P. Primicias - former Philippine Senate Majority Floor Leader; 6th placer, 1923 Bar Exams
- Arturo M. Tolentino – former Philippine Senate President; 2nd placer, 1934 Bar Exams
- Jovito Salonga – former Philippine Senate President; 1st placer, 1944 Bar Exams
- Neptali Gonzales – former Philippine Senate President; 9th placer, 1949 Bar Exams
- Ernesto M. Maceda – former Philippine Senate President; 10th placer, 1956 Bar Exams
- Franklin M. Drilon – former Philippine Senate President; 3rd placer, 1969 Bar Exams
- Lorenzo Sumulong – former Philippine Senator; 1st placer, 1929 Bar Exams
- Jose W. Diokno – former Philippine Senator; 1st placer, 1944 Bar Exams
- Rene Saguisag – former Philippine Senator; 6th placer, 1963 Bar Exams
- Aquilino Pimentel III (Koko Pimentel) – Philippine Senator; 1st placer, 1990 Bar Exams
- Sergio Osmeña – former Speaker of the House of Representatives; 2nd placer, 1903 Bar Exams
- Jose Yulo – former Speaker of the House of Representatives; 3rd placer, 1913 Bar Exams
- José P. Laurel- former Senator; 2nd Placer 1915
- Leila de Lima – former senator; former Secretary of Justice; former Commission on Human Rights (CHR) Chairperson; 8th placer, 1985 Bar Exams

=== Representatives ===
- Antonio Eduardo Nachura – former Samar Representative; 7th placer, 1967 Bar Exams
- Ronaldo Zamora – San Juan Representative; 1st placer, 1969 Bar Exams
- Prospero Nograles – Speaker of the House of Representatives; 2nd placer, 1971 Bar Exams
- Arturo D. Brion – Assemblyman, Philippine National Assembly; 1st placer, 1974 Bar Exams
- Gilberto Eduardo Gerardo C. Teodoro, Jr. – former Tarlac Representative; 1st placer, 1989 Bar Exams
- Pablo Chico Payawal - Former Representative 4th District of Bulacan 1935-1936; 1st placer, 1921 Bar Exams

=== Appointees and career service officials ===
- Jose Hontiveros - Delegate, Philippine Constitutional Convention of 1934; 1st placer, 1911 Bar Exams
- Roberto Concepcion – Member, 1986 Constitutional Commission; 1st placer, 1924 Bar Exams
- Lorenzo Sumulong – Member, 1986 Constitutional Commission; 1st placer, 1929 Bar Exams
- Arturo Tolentino – Member, Philippine Civil Code Commission; former Minister of Foreign Affairs; 2nd placer, 1934 Bar Exams
- Ambrosio Padilla – Member, 1986 Constitutional Commission; 3rd placer, 1934 Bar Exams
- Diosdado Macapagal – President, Philippine Constitutional Convention of 1971; 1st placer, 1936 Bar Exams
- Cecilia Muñoz-Palma – President, Philippine Constitutional Commission of 1986; chairperson, Philippine Charity Sweepstakes Office; 1st placer, 1937 Bar Exams
- Jovito Salonga – former chairman, Presidential Commission on Good Government; 1st placer, 1944 Bar Exams
- Ameurfina Melencio-Herrera – Chancellor, Philippine Judicial Academy; chairperson, Legal Publications Committee, Supreme Court Centenary Celebrations; 1st placer, 1947 Bar Exams
- Andres Narvasa – chairman, Preparatory Commission for Constitutional Reform; 2nd placer, 1951 Bar Exams
- Gabriel Singson – former Governor of the Central Bank of the Philippines; 2nd placer, 1952 Bar Exams
- Florenz D. Regalado – Member, 1986 Constitutional Commission; 1st placer, 1954 Bar Exams
- Jose Nolledo – Delegate, 1971 Constitutional Convention & Member, 1986 Constitutional Commission; 3rd placer, 1958 Bar Exams
- Haydee Yorac – former chairperson, Presidential Commission on Good Government; former Commissioner, Commission on Elections; 8th placer, 1962 Bar Exams
- Adolfo Azcuna – Member, 1986 Constitutional Commission; 4th placer, 1962 Bar Exams
- Joaquin G. Bernas – Member, 1986 Constitutional Commission; Member, Feliciano Commission investigating the Oakwood mutiny; 9th placer, 1962 Bar Exam
- Romeo C. de la Cruz—former Solicitor General; 9th placer, 1957 Bar Exams
- Sergio A. Apostol – Chief Presidential Legal Counsel; 7th placer, 1958 Bar Exams
- Antonio Eduardo Nachura – former Solicitor General; 7th placer, 1967 Bar Exams
- Fulgencio S. Factoran, Jr. – former Executive Secretary; 9th placer, 1967 Bar Exams
- Ronaldo B. Zamora – former Executive Secretary; 1st placer, 1969 Bar Exams
- Franklin Drilon – former Secretary of Labor and Employment; 3rd placer, 1969 Bar Exams
- Arturo D. Brion – Secretary of Labor and Employment; 1st placer, 1974 Bar Exams
- Antonio Carpio – former Chief Presidential Legal Counsel; 6th placer, 1975 Bar Exams
- Simeon Marcelo – former Philippine Ombudsman; 5th placer, 1979 Bar Exams
- Leila de Lima – former Secretary of Justice; former Commission on Human Rights (CHR) Chairperson; 8th placer, 1985 Bar Exams
- Gilberto Eduardo Gerardo C. Teodoro, Jr. – Secretary of National Defense; 1st placer, 1989 Bar Exams
- Janet B. Abuel – Undersecretary, Department of Budget and Management; 1st placer, 1998 Bar Exams

=== Local officials ===
- Jose Hontiveros - former Governor of Capiz; 1st placer, 1911 Bar Exams
- Pablo P. Garcia – former Governor of Cebu; 3rd placer, 1951 Bar Exams
- Juanito Remulla, Sr. – former Governor of Cavite; 4th placer, 1956 Bar Exams
- Henry Villarica – Incumbent Mayor of Meycauayan City; 1st Placer 1971 Bar Exams
- Presbitero Velasco, Jr. – former Governor of Marinduque; 6th placer, 1971 Bar Exams

=== Academe ===
- Joaquin G. Bernas – former president, Ateneo de Manila University; Dean Emeritus, Ateneo Law School; 9th placer, 1962 Bar Exam
- Antonio La Viña - former Dean, Ateneo School of Government; 3rd placer, 1989 Bar Exam
- Jovito Salonga – former Dean, Far Eastern University Institute of Law; 1st placer, 1944 Bar Exams
- Neptali Gonzales – former Dean, Far Eastern University Institute of Law; 9th placer, 1949 Bar Exams
- Andres Narvasa – former Dean, University of Santo Tomas Faculty of Civil Law; 2nd placer, 1951 Bar Exams
- Cesar L. Villanueva – Dean, Ateneo Law School; 2nd placer, 1981 Bar Exams
- Pablito V. Sanidad, Sr. - University of the Philippines former Dean, University of Baguio School of Law; 8th placer, 1967 Bar Exams
