= Philippine Law Journal =

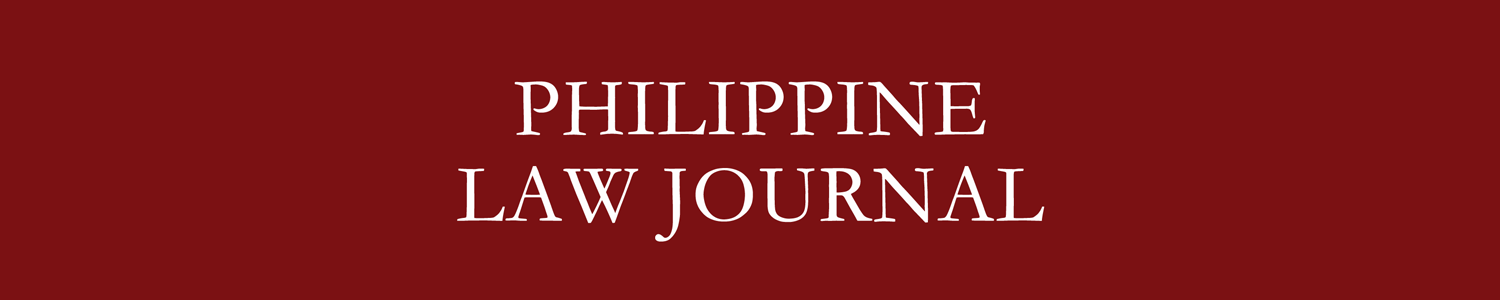
- Discipline: Law, Legal Studies
- Language: English

Publication details
- History: 1914–present
- Publisher: University of the Philippines College of Law (Philippines)
- Frequency: Quarterly

Standard abbreviations
- Bluebook: Phil. L.J.
- ISO 4: Philipp. Law J.

Indexing
- ISSN: 0031-7721
- OCLC no.: 1762247

Links
- Journal homepage; HeinOnline Access

The Philippine Law Journal is an academic student-run law review affiliated with the UP College of Law at the University of the Philippines Diliman. Established in August 1914, the journal marked its 100th anniversary in 2014 as the oldest law review in the Philippines and the oldest English language law journal in Asia. It is managed by the editorial board, composed of select students of the University of the Philippines College of Law. The journal publishes four issues every year.

Its main office is at the Justice Alex A. Reyes Room of Malcolm Hall, University of the Philippines Diliman. The room is named after the Supreme Court Associate Justice who served as the journal's first editor.

== History ==
=== Inception and early years ===
Established in 1914 under the guidance of the UP College of Law's founder and first dean, Justice George A. Malcolm, and the law faculty, the journal was designed as a vital training tool for law students, and modeled after the student-edited law reviews of American law schools. At its inception, the journal was distinctively the only English legal publication in the Orient.

The pioneer editorial board was composed of former Associate Justice Alexander Reyes as managing editor; Paulino Gullas as business manager; and Jose A. Espiritu, Victoriano Yamzon, and Aurelio Montinola as associate editors. The inaugural issue featured a message from Justice Malcolm, which encouraged students to publish and maintain a law journal that would stimulate discourse and disseminate legal knowledge.

The journal originally published nine issues per academic year. The issues contained legal articles, comments, and case reviews. They also contained write-ups on the University of the Philippines College of Law, including its social events and co-curricular activities, and the college's alumni. Frontispieces of Supreme Court justices and prominent practitioners were also featured in the earlier issues. The issues also contained commercial advertisements in order to generate income for the operations of the journal.

=== Recent history ===
In 2010, at the height of the disciplinary proceedings against the 37 faculty members of the College of Law who publicly spoke against the alleged plagiarism in Vinuya v. Executive Secretary, the journal released a strong statement on defending legal scholarship.

While issues of the journal were, by then, available on the Internet for some time, in 2012 and 2013, a major push towards digitalization was made with the re-launch of the PLJ Website, containing an extensive archive of the Journal's published volumes. The ten-year digitalization project was heavily supported by Senior Associate Justice Antonio T. Carpio, who also sponsored the Special Maritime Issue of the journal, a continuing digital issue of the publication devoted to maritime law issues, particularly those surrounding the competing claims on the portion of the South China Sea known in the Philippines as the West Philippine Sea.

In 2014, the Centennial Year of the Journal, the publication was made available on HeinOnline, one of the world's biggest legal research services—a first for a Philippine law review—through the efforts of the College of Law and the UP Law Library.

== Editors ==
The journal is edited by a board of student editors under the supervision of a faculty adviser. A new board composed of sophomore, junior and senior students of the College of Law is formed annually, following a competitive examination graded by a committee of faculty members. Beginning in Vol. 99, the Board began implementing a peer-review policy. Peer-reviewed articles now undergo a standard double-blind reviewing procedure to assess their scholarly merit.

In its early years, members of the board were selected based on academic performance. The board composition varied according to the needs in a particular academic year. At that time, there was no chairperson. That position was created only in 1935, with Enrique Fernando being appointed as chairperson. Today, the members are selected on the basis of competitive examinations and academic qualifications. Until 2014, the board was composed of only eight members: a chair, vice-chair, and six editors. The number of editors was raised to eight in 2014. The students who rank first and second in the examinations serve as the chair and vice-chair, respectively.

The issues of the journal are distributed to various legal and educational institutions in the Philippines and abroad, including the United States, Canada, England, Germany, Switzerland, the Netherlands, Belgium, Spain, Australia, Japan, India, China, Malaysia, South Africa, Argentina, Puerto Rico, Mexico, Colombia, Venezuela, and Brazil. The journal also maintains exchange arrangements with other law reviews, both domestic and foreign.

== Citations ==
Articles published in the journal have been cited in numerous decisions of the Philippine Supreme Court, including:

- Theodore O. Te, Stare (In)Decisis: Reflections on Judicial Flip-flopping in League of Cities v. Comelec and Navarro v. Ermita, 85 Phil. L.J. 784 (2011), cited in Fetalino v. Commission on Elections (2012)
- Florentino P. Feliciano, "Deconstruction of Constitutional Limitations and the Tariff Regime of the Philippines: The Strange Persistence of a Martial Law Syndrome," 84 Phil. L.J. 311 (2009), cited in BOCEA v. Teves (2011)
- Serafin P. Hilado, A Comparative Study of the Adoption Law under the Spanish Civil Code and the Code of Civil Procedure, 4 Phil. L.J. 313 (1918), cited in Lahom v. Sibulo (2003)
- Numeriano Rodriguez, Jr., Structural Analysis of the 1973 Constitution, 57 Phil. L.J. 104 (1982), cited in Francisco v. House of Representatives (2003)
- Hector Martinez, The High and Impregnable Wall of Separation Between Church and State, 37 Phil. L. J. 748 (1962), cited in Estrada v. Escritor (2003)
- Irene Cortes, Redress of Grievances and the Philippine Ombudsman (Tanodbayan), 57 Phil. L. J. 1 (1982), cited in Uy v. Sandiganbayan (2001)
- Tuason, A Commitment to Official Integrity (Background, Rationale and Explanation of Article XIII, Sandiganbayan and Tanodbayan), 48 Phil. L.J. 548 (1973), cited in Uy v. Sandiganbayan (2001)
- Owen J. Lynch, Jr., The Philippine Colonial Dichotomy: Attraction and Disenfranchisement, 63 Phil. L. J. 139 (1988), cited in Cruz v. Secretary of Environment and Natural Resources (2000)
- Owen J. Lynch, Jr., Invisible Peoples and a Hidden Agenda: The Origins of Contemporary Philippine Land Laws (1900-1913), 63 Phil. L.J. 249 (1988), cited in Cruz.
- Owen J. Lynch, Jr., Legal Bases of Philippine Colonial Sovereignty: An Inquiry, 62 Phil. L.J. 279 (1987), cited in Cruz.
- Owen J. Lynch, Jr., Land Rights, Land Laws and Land Usurpation: The Spanish Era (1568-1898), 63 P.L.J. 82 (1988), cited in Cruz.
- Owen J. Lynch, Jr., Native Title, Private Right and Tribal Land Law, 57 Phil. L.J. 268 (1982), cited in Cruz.
- Ma. Lourdes Aranal-Sereno & Roan Libarios, The Interface Between National Land Law and Kalinga Land Law, 58 Phil. L.J. 420 (1983), cited in Cruz.

== Alumni editors ==
More than a thousand former students and faculty members of the University of the Philippines College of Law have sat in either student or faculty editorial boards. Following contemporaneous law review tradition, the journal was likewise designed to be a training ground for legal scholars and practitioners of law. Many alumni editors have played important roles in shaping Philippine law, jurisprudence, and society, through their leadership in the judiciary, the government service, the academe, and the legal profession, both in the Philippines and abroad.

=== Judiciary ===
==== Chief Justices ====
- Teresita Leonardo de Castro (2018), Associate Justice (2007-2018)
- Ma. Lourdes P.A. Sereno (2012-2018), Associate Justice (2010-2012)
- Reynato Puno (2006-2010), Associate Justice (1993-2006)
- Hilario Davide, Jr. (1998-2005), Associate Justice (1991-1998)
- Marcelo Fernan (1988-1991), Associate Justice (1986-1988), Senate President (1998-1999), Senator (1995-1999)
- Ramon Aquino (1985-1986), Associate Justice (1973-1985)
- Felix Makasiar (1985), Associate Justice (1970-1985), Secretary of Justice (1970), Solicitor General (1968-1970)
- Enrique Fernando (1979-1985), Associate Justice (1967-1979)
- Fred Ruiz Castro (1976-1979), Associate Justice (1966-1976), Executive Secretary (1953-1955)
- César Bengzon (1961-1966)

==== Associate Justices ====
- Antonio Carpio (2001-2019)
- Presbitero Velasco, Jr. (2006-2018)
- Francis Jardeleza (2014-2019), Solicitor General (2012-2014)
- Cancio Garcia (2004-2007)
- Leonardo A. Quisumbing (1998-2009)
- Hugo Gutierrez, Jr. (1982-1993)
- Flerida Ruth Pineda-Romero (1991-1999)
- Abraham Sarmiento (1987-1991)
- Conrado Vasquez (1982-1983)
- Ameurfina Melencio-Herrera (1979-1992)
- Cecilia Muñoz-Palma (1973-1978), Chair of the 1986 Philippine Constitutional Commission (1986)
- Calixto Zaldivar (1964-1974)

=== Politics ===
==== Executive ====
- Ferdinand E. Marcos, President & Senate President
- Fulgencio Factoran, former Secretary of Environment & Natural Resources
- Francisco Chavez, Solicitor General (1987-1992)
- Simeon Marcelo, Solicitor General (2001-2002) & Ombudsman (2002-2005)

==== Legislative ====
- Franklin Drilon, Senate President (2000, 2001-2006, 2013-2016)
- Juan Ponce Enrile, Senate President (2008-2013)
- Edgardo Angara, Senate President (1993-1995), Senator (1987-1998), Secretary of Agriculture (1999-2001)
- Miriam Defensor Santiago, Senator
- Juan Edgardo Angara, Senator, Current Secretary of Education
- Edcel Lagman, Member of the House of Representatives

=== Constitutional Commission and other bodies ===
- Purificacion Quisumbing, Chair of the Commission on Human Rights (2002-2008)
- Haydee Yorac, Chair of the Commission on Elections (1989-1991) & Presidential Commission on Good Government (2001-2005)

=== Professional and legal practice ===
- Felipe Gozon
- Raul Pangalangan, former Judge of the International Criminal Court, former Dean of the UP College of Law
- Theodore Te
