= Ameurfina Melencio-Herrera =

Filipino lawyer and judge (1922–2020)

The Honorable Ameurfina Melencio-Herrera
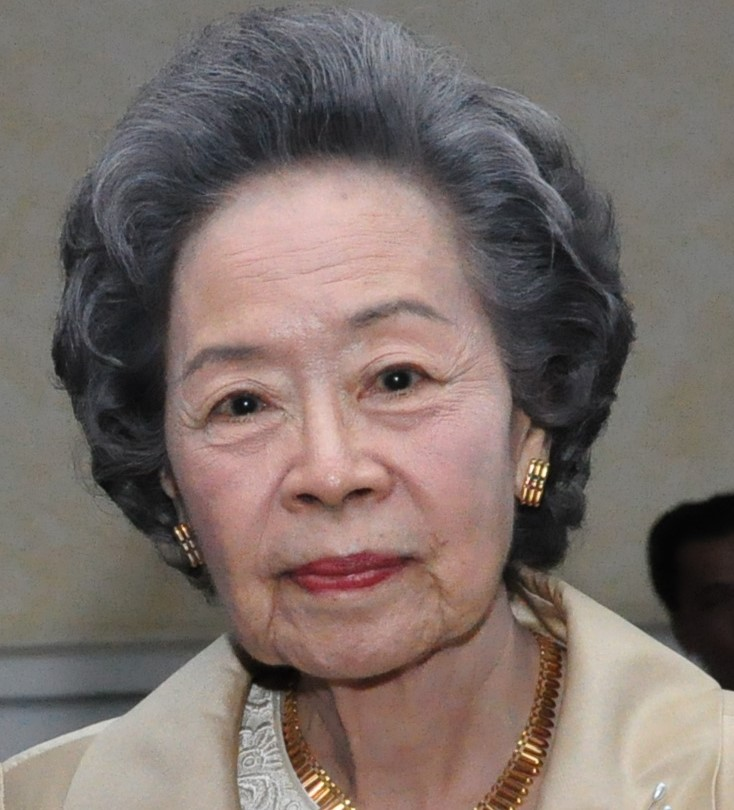

98th Associate Justice of the Supreme Court of the Philippines
- In office 17 January 1979 – 11 May 1992
- Appointed by: Ferdinand Marcos
- Preceded by: Cecilia Muñoz-Palma
- Succeeded by: Jose Melo

Personal details
- Born: Ameurfina Aguinaldo Melencio; 11 May 1922 Cabanatuan, Nueva Ecija, Philippine Islands
- Died: 12 October 2020 (aged 98) Cabanatuan, Nueva Ecija, Philippines

Ameurfina Melencio Herrera (born Ameurfina Aguinaldo Melencio; 11 May 1922 – 12 October 2020) was a Filipino lawyer who served as an Associate Justice of the Philippine Supreme Court from 1979 to 1992. She was the second woman appointed to the Supreme Court, filling the vacancy left by the retirement of the first female Supreme Court Justice, Cecilia Muñoz-Palma.

== Personal life ==
Born in Cabanatuan, Nueva Ecija to Jose P. and Carmen (née Aguinaldo) Melencio, Herrera was a granddaughter of Emilio Aguinaldo, the first President of the Philippines. Among the future Justice's baptismal godfathers was Supreme Court justice George A. Malcolm, who also happened to be the founder of the law school she would later attend, the University of the Philippines College of Law.

Melencio-Herrera died on 12 October 2020 at the age of 98.

== Early career ==
Herrera studied law at the University of the Philippines and graduated cum laude in 1947. She topped the 1947 Philippine Bar Examinations with a 93.85% bar rating. She has attained the highest rating for all women bar examinees in Philippine Bar history. After a brief stint with a New York City law firm, Herrera engaged in private practice for several years until she was appointed to the judiciary. From 1962 to 1973, Herrera served as a trial court judge assigned in Quezon Province, then the City of Manila. She was appointed to the Court of Appeals in 1973.

== Supreme Court ==
=== Ericta scandal ===
Herrera was elevated to the Supreme Court by President Ferdinand Marcos in 1979. In March 1982, Herrera resigned as chair of the court's examination committee after revealing that the mercantile law grades of Associate Justice Vicente Ericta's son Gustavo, who took the 1981 Philippine Bar Examinations, was changed from 56 to 58 percent prior to publication of the test results to enable him to pass with a general average of 73 and become a fully fledged lawyer. Chief Justice Enrique Fernando subsequently admitted ordering the revision in the younger Ericta's grade but denied allegations of unethical behavior, saying that it was done to correct an "oversight" by the examiner upon the advice of justices Ramon Aquino and Ramon Fernandez, who were prematurely shown Ericta's grades, and citing a similar predicament with one of his sons, who died shortly after passing the bar exam.

Following public uproar and demands for their impeachment, all 14 members of the Supreme Court, including six justices who were not directly involved in the grade tampering, submitted their resignation to President Marcos on May 11. All of them were subsequently reappointed days later by Marcos, except for Ericta and Fernandez, who were both "found responsible" for the scandal by a group of former justices advising the president.

=== Aquino presidency ===
When Corazon Aquino assumed the presidency following the 1986 EDSA Revolution, the incumbent members of the Supreme Court, all of whom were Marcos appointees, were asked to resign. Herrera, along with Claudio Teehankee Sr., Vicente Abad Santos, Nestor Alampay, and Hugo Gutierrez Jr. were the only incumbent justices who retained their seats on the bench. Aquino, however, opted to extend new appointments to these justices in lieu of extending their previous appointment by Marcos. Prior to re-appointing Herrera, Alampay and Gutierrez Jr. on 16 April 1986, Aquino appointed three new members to the Supreme Court, Jose Feria, Marcelo Fernan and Andres Narvasa. As a result, Herrera, Alampay and Gutierrez Jr. were supplanted in seniority by the Aquino appointees.

When Chief Justice Marcelo Fernan resigned in 1992 to run for the vice-presidency, Herrera was widely regarded as a leading contender to replace him. Because she was overtaken in seniority by Narvasa after the 1986 reorganization, however, it was Narvasa who was named Chief Justice, although Herrera had served on the Court longer.

Herrera retired in May 1992, and was named as the Chancellor of the Philippine Judicial Academy upon its inception in 1996. The academy is tasked with the professional training of members of the Philippines judiciary. Herrera served as Chancellor until May 2009.

== Notes ==
Legal offices
Preceded by Cecilia Muñoz-Palma	Associate Justice of the Supreme Court; 17 January 1979–11 May 1992	Succeeded by Jose Melo
