= Carolina Griño-Aquino =

Filipino judge

The Honorable Carolina Griño-Aquino
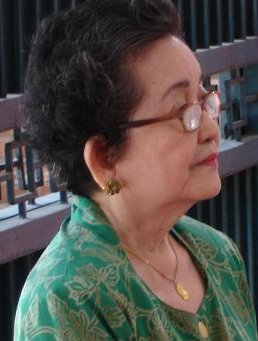

Presiding Justice of the Court of Appeals of the Philippines
- In office January 31, 1987 – April 19, 1988
- Preceded by: Emilio Gancayco
- Succeeded by: Rodolfo Nocon

121st Associate Justice of the Supreme Court of the Philippines
- In office February 2, 1988 – October 22, 1993
- Appointed by: Corazon Aquino
- Preceded by: Claudio Teehankee
- Succeeded by: Leo D. Medialdea

Personal details
- Born: October 22, 1923 Leganes, Iloilo
- Died: December 24, 2012 (aged 89)
- Occupation: Judge, Lawyer

Carolina Griño-Aquino (October 22, 1923 – December 24, 2012) was a Filipino judge. She served as a Presiding Justice of the Court of Appeals of the Philippines before being appointed to the Supreme Court of the Philippines by President Corazon Aquino in 1988. She served on the Supreme Court as an Associate Justice from February 2, 1988, until October 22, 1993. Griño-Aquino was the fourth woman to serve on the Supreme Court, following Associate Justices Cecilia Muñoz-Palma, Ameurfina Melencio-Herrera and Irene Cortes.

== Early life and education ==
She was born on October 22, 1923, in the town of Leganes, Iloilo. She graduated magna cum laude with a liberal arts degree from Colegio de San Agustin (now the University of San Agustin) in Iloilo City. Griño-Aquino then obtained a law degree from the University of the Philippines College of Law in 1950. She placed first in the 1950 Bar Exams, achieving a score of 92.02 percent.

== Later years ==
Following her retirement from the Supreme Court in 1993, Griño-Aquino became the first Chairperson of the Mandatory Continuing Legal Education Committee. The Supreme Court also appointed Griño-Aquino to lead or participate in several investigations, including the probe of the Bar Exam leakage in 2003, the GSIS-Meralco bribery case in 2008, and the investigation into the Integrated Bar of the Philippines elections in 2009.

== Personal life ==
Her husband, former Chief Justice of the Supreme Court of the Philippines Ramon Aquino, served on the Court from 1985 to 1986.

== Death ==
Carolina Griño-Aquino died from a long illness on December 24, 2012, at the age of 89.

== See also ==
- Court of Appeals of the Philippines
- Associate Justice of the Supreme Court of the Philippines
