= Vicente Ericta =

Filipino judge (1920–1995)

The Honorable Vicente Ericta

99th Associate Justice of the Supreme Court of the Philippines
- In office November 20, 1981 – May 11, 1982
- Appointed by: Ferdinand Marcos
- Preceded by: Ruperto Martin
- Succeeded by: Hugo Gutierrez Jr.

Personal details
- Born: February 15, 1915 Laoag, Ilocos Norte, Philippine Islands
- Died: February 18, 2007 (aged 92)
- Education: University of the Philippines (BA); University of the Philippines (LLB)

Vicente Garma Ericta (February 15, 1915 - February 18, 2007) was a former associate justice of the Supreme Court of the Philippines. He was sworn in as a member of the Supreme Court by President Ferdinand Marcos on November 20, 1981, but resigned on May 11, 1982 after being involved in a scandal over the admission of his son as a lawyer, in a case that also saw the resignation of the entire Supreme Court.

== Biography ==
Born in Laoag, Ilocos Norte, on February 15, 1915, Ericta finished his elementary and secondary education in Ilocos Norte. He obtained his pre-law degree and law degree from the University of the Philippines College of Law where he graduated in 1939. He was a classmate and Upsilon Sigma Phi fraternity brother of Ferdinand Marcos, who later appointed him to government positions during his presidency.

During the Second World War, he was appointed as military mayor of Laoag.

Ericta's career in the judiciary began in 1946, when he was appointed as Assistant Provincial Fiscal (prosecutor) of Ilocos Norte. He then became a judge in Pagadian, Zamboanga del Sur, in 1966 and later held judgeships in Rizal and Quezon City. In 1975, he joined the Court of Appeals as an associate justice before being appointed by President Marcos as Tanodbayan (predecessor of the Ombudsman of the Philippines) in 1979. In 1981, he was appointed as an associate justice of the Supreme Court. At the same time, Ericta also taught law at the Northwestern College of Law in Laoag.

== Resignation ==
Ericta's tenure in the Supreme Court was cut short after he was implicated in a scandal over the conduct of the 1981 Philippine Bar Examinations that were overseen by the court. In March 1982, Associate Justice Ameurfina Melencio-Herrera publicly said that the mercantile law grades of Ericta's son Gustavo, who took the examination, was changed from 56 to 58 percent prior to publication of the test results to enable him to pass with a general average of 73 and become a fully-pledged lawyer. Chief Justice Enrique Fernando subsequently admitted ordering the revision in the younger Ericta's grade but denied allegations of unethical behavior, saying that it was done to correct an "oversight" by the examiner upon the advice of justices Ramon Aquino and Ramon Fernandez, who were prematurely shown Ericta's grades, and citing a similar predicament with one of Fernando's sons, who died shortly after passing the bar exam.

Following public uproar and demands for their impeachment, all 14 members of the Supreme Court, including six justices who were not directly involved in the grade tampering, submitted their resignation to President Marcos on May 11. All of them were subsequently reappointed days later by Marcos, except for Ericta and Fernandez, who were both "found responsible" for the scandal by a group of former justices advising the president.

== Death ==
Ericta died in 2007.

Legal offices
Preceded by Ruperto Martin	Associate Justice of the Supreme Court; 20 November 1981–11 May 1982	Succeeded by Hugo Gutierrez Jr.
