= Felix Makasiar =

Chief Justice of the Philippines in 1985

The Honourable Félix V. Makasiar
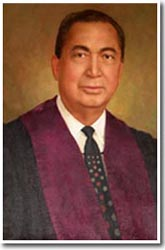

14th Chief Justice of the Supreme Court of the Philippines
- In office July 25, 1985 – November 19, 1985
- Appointed by: Ferdinand E. Marcos
- Preceded by: Enrique Fernando
- Succeeded by: Ramon Aquino

85th Associate Justice of the Supreme Court of the Philippines
- In office August 2, 1970 – November 18, 1985
- Appointed by: Ferdinand E. Marcos
- Preceded by: Conrado V. Sanchez
- Succeeded by: Jose Feria

Secretary of Justice
- In office February 8, 1970 – August 1, 1970
- President: Ferdinand E. Marcos
- Preceded by: Juan Ponce Enrile
- Succeeded by: Vicente Abad Santos

Solicitor General of the Philippines
- In office July 1, 1968 – February 8, 1970
- President: Ferdinand E. Marcos
- Preceded by: Antonio P. Barredo
- Succeeded by: Félix Q. Antonio

Personal details
- Born: Félix Makasiar; November 20, 1915 Siaton, Negros Oriental, Philippine Islands. U.S.
- Died: February 19, 1992 (aged 76) Manila, Philippines
- Resting place: Libingan ng mga Bayani
- Spouse: Teofista F. Santos
- Children: Loretta M. Sicat; Rosella Jean M. Puno; Barry; Gary; Cynthia; Eleanore Lynn
- Education: Far Eastern University; University of the Philippines

Félix Valencia Makasiar (November 20, 1915 – February 19, 1992) was the 14th Chief Justice of the Supreme Court of the Philippines, serving in that capacity for four months in 1985. His 85-day stint as Chief Justice, abbreviated only because of the rule requiring mandatory retirement upon reaching the age of 70, was the third shortest in Philippine history, behind the tenures of Pedro Yap and Teresita Leonardo-de Castro. Prior to his promotion as Chief Justice, Makasiar had served for 15 years as an Associate Justice.

== Profile ==
Makasiar was born in Siaton, Negros Oriental, on November 20, 1915, to Agustín Makasiar and Petra Valencia. He finished his primary and secondary education in his home province. He completed his undergraduate studies at the Far Eastern University, and enrolled at the University of the Philippines College of Law, where he obtained his Bachelor of Laws degree, cum laude, in 1939 as salutatorian, surpassing Ferdinand Marcos and Ramon Aquino. He later obtained a Master of Laws degree from the University of Santo Tomas.

Upon passing the bar in 1939, Makasiar joined government service as an attorney with the Department of Justice. He would not leave the government service until his retirement from the Supreme Court in 1985. Makasiar rose in the ranks, beginning with a stint with the Office of the Solicitor General, then as a trial court judge beginning in 1954. He was appointed Solicitor-General and Undersecretary of the Department of Justice from 1968 to 1970, and as Secretary of Justice from May until August 1970, at which time he was appointed as Associate Justice to the Supreme Court.

Prior to his appointment to the High Court, Makasiar also worked as a law professor in several universities, including the Manuel L. Quezon University and the San Beda College.

He was married to Teofista F. Santos of Rizal with whom he had six children: Loretta M. Sicat, Rosella Jean M. Puno, Barry, Gary, Cynthia, and Eleanore Lynn M. Paez.

== Supreme Court service ==
Makasiar served a total of 15 years on the Court, all within the term of his appointer and law school classmate President Ferdinand E. Marcos. He became chair of the Judiciary Code Committee, the vice-chair of the Committee on the Revised Rules of Court, and the first chair of the Sharia bar examinations inaugurated in 1984.

=== Jurisprudence ===
The most prominent issues during Makasiar's tenure on the Court concerned the validity of the acts of the martial law regime began by Marcos in 1972. On those issues, Makasiar had been described as a loyal ally of Marcos and a consistent supporter of the President's New Society policies. He was among the Justices who voted to affirm the validity of the 1973 Constitution in the seminal case of Javellana v. Executive Secretary, 50 SCRA 33 (1973). More prominently, in Aquino v. COMELEC, 62 SCRA 33 (1975), Makasiar wrote for the Court as it denied petitions for prohibition which maintained that Marcos, whose original term as president expired 2 years earlier, held no legal office nor lawful authority. Relying on Javellana and Aquino v. Ponce-Enrile (which affirmed the validity of the 1972 proclamation of martial law), Makasiar wrote that Marcos was the de jure incumbent President of the Philippines.

In questions concerning labor law and social justice, Makasiar's opinions for the Court reflected sympathies to the common man, and would sometimes resort in rebuke to injustices as reflected by the facts of the case. For example, in Carbonell v. CA, 69 SCRA 99(1976), Makasiar wrote:

Hence, Carbonell's prior purchase of the land was made in good faith. Her good faith subsisted and continued to exist when she recorded her adverse claim four (4) days prior to the registration of Infante's deed of sale. Carbonell's good faith did not cease after Poncio told her on January 31, 1955 of his second sale of the same lot to Infante, Because of that information, Carbonell wanted an audience with Infante, which desire underscores Carbonell's good faith. With an aristocratic disdain unworthy of the good breeding of a good Christian and good neighbor, Infante snubbed Carbonell like a leper and refused to see her. So Carbonell did the next best thing to protect her right — she registered her adverse claim on February 8, 1955. Under the circumstances, this recording of her adverse claim should be deemed to have been done in good faith and should emphasize Infante's bad faith when she registered her deed of sale four (4) days later on February 12, 1955.

In Menez v. ECC, G.R. L-48488, April 25, 1980, a case involving the upholding of a teacher's compensation due to occupational disease, Makasiar expounded at length on the plight of public school teachers:

... Rheumatoid arthritis and pneumonitis can be considered as such occupational diseases. All public high school teachers, like herein petitioner, admittedly the most underpaid but overworked employees of the government, are subject to emotional strains and stresses, dealing as they do with intractable teenagers especially young boys, and harassed as they are by various extra-curricular or non- academic assignments, aside from preparing lesson plans until late at night, if they are not badgered by very demanding superiors. In the case of the petitioner, her emotional tension is heightened by the fact that the high school in which she teaches is situated in a tough area - Binondo district, which is inhabited by thugs and other criminal elements and further aggravated by the heavy pollution and congestion therein as well as the stinking smell of the dirty Estero de la Reina nearby. Women, like herein petitioner, are most vulnerable to such unhealthy conditions. The pitiful situation of all public school teachers is further accentuated by poor diet for they can ill-afford nutritious food. xxx In her work, petitioner also has to contend with the natural elements, like the inclement weather — heavy rains, typhoons — as well as dust — and disease-ridden surroundings peculiar to an insanitary slum area. xxx These unwholesome conditions are "normal and consistently present in" or are the "hazards peculiar to" the occupation of a public high school teacher. It is therefore evident that rheumatoid arthritis and pneumonitis are the "natural incidents" of petitioner's occupation as such public high school teacher. xxx It must be borne in mind that petitioner was a teacher of the Raja Soliman High School which is located in the heart of Binondo District. She was constantly exposed to the heavily polluted air and congestion (squatter's area) characteristic of the area. She was not only exposed to the elements - varying degrees of temperature throughout the day and night - but also had to withstand long hours of standing while performing her teaching job. Likewise, she had to regularly negotiate long trips from her home in Project 2, Quirino District, Quezon City (her residence) to said high school in Binondo, scampering from one ride to another, rain or shine, and sweating in the process.

=== Promotion to Chief Justice ===
Makasiar's appointment as Chief Justice by President Marcos on July 25, 1985, replacing Enrique Fernando, was deemed as controversial. Had the tradition of seniority been observed by Marcos, Claudio Teehankee, who was appointed to the Court nearly two years prior to Makasiar, would have been elevated as Chief Justice. However, Teehankee had constantly voted to nullify the actions of the martial law regime, in contrast to the more favorable positions of Makasiar.

During Makasiar's brief tenure as Chief Justice, the Supreme Court issued two notable rulings favorable to the Marcos government. In Galman v. Pamaran, 138 SCRA 294 (1985), the Court ruled in favor of the defendants in the pending murder trial of Benigno Aquino Jr. after they sought the exclusion of their earlier testimonies before the Agrava Board previously tasked with investigating the Aquino assassination. In Ilagan v. Enrile, 139 SCRA 349(1985), the Court refused to act on petitions for habeas corpus filed in behalf of 3 lawyers who had been arrested and detained without warrants of arrest, ruling that the petitions were mooted by the subsequent filing of criminal informations for rebellion against the lawyers.

== Retirement and death ==
Makasiar retired from the Supreme Court upon reaching the age of 70 in November 1985. He died 7 years later, on February 19, 1992, in Manila.

== Notes ==
Preceded by Juan Ponce Enrile	Philippine Secretary of Justice; February 7, 1970 – August 2, 1970	Succeeded by Vicente Abad Santos
Preceded by Enrique Fernando	Chief Justice of the Supreme Court of the Philippines; July 25, 1985–November 19, 1985	Succeeded by Ramon Aquino
