= Ramon Fernandez (judge) =

Filipino judge (1920-1995)

The Honorable Ramon Fernandez

95th Associate Justice of the Supreme Court of the Philippines
- In office May 27, 1977 – May 11, 1982
- Appointed by: Ferdinand Marcos
- Preceded by: Roberto Regala
- Succeeded by: Lorenzo Relova

Personal details
- Born: February 16, 1916 Libon, Albay, Philippine Islands
- Died: March 25, 1997 (aged 81)
- Education: University of the Philippines (BA); University of the Philippines (LLB)

Ramon Calleja Fernandez (February 16, 1916 - March 25, 1997) was a former associate justice of the Supreme Court of the Philippines. He was sworn in as a member of the Supreme Court by President Ferdinand Marcos on May 27, 1977, but resigned on May 11, 1982 after being involved in a scandal over the admission of the son of a fellow associate justice as a lawyer, in a case that also saw the resignation of the entire Supreme Court.

== Biography ==
Born in Libon, Albay on February 16, 1916, Fernandez obtained his pre-law degree and law degree from the University of the Philippines College of Law where he graduated in 1939. He was a classmate and Upsilon Sigma Phi fraternity brother of Ferdinand Marcos, who later appointed him to government positions during his presidency.

He taught law at the University of the Philippines, Manuel L. Quezon University, and the Philippine Law School before joining government as an undersecretary of the Department of Justice from 1968 to 1971. In 1977 he was appointed as an associate justice of the Supreme Court.

== Resignation ==
Fernandez's tenure in the Supreme Court was cut short after he was implicated in a scandal over the conduct of the 1981 Philippine Bar Examinations that were overseen by the court. In March 1982, Associate Justice Ameurfina Melencio-Herrera publicly said that the mercantile law grades of Associate Justice Vicente Ericta's son Gustavo, who took the examination, was changed from 56 to 58 percent prior to publication of the test results to enable him to pass with a general average of 73 and become a full-fledged lawyer. Chief Justice Enrique Fernando subsequently admitted ordering the revision in the younger Ericta's grade but denied allegations of unethical behavior, saying that it was done to correct an "oversight" by the examiner upon the advice of justices Ramon Aquino and Fernandez, who were prematurely shown Ericta's grades, and citing a similar predicament with one of Fernando’s sons, who died shortly after passing the bar exam.

Following public uproar and demands for their impeachment, all 14 members of the Supreme Court, including six justices who were not directly involved in the grade tampering, submitted their resignation to President Marcos on May 11. All of them were subsequently reappointed days later by Marcos, except for Ericta and Fernandez, who were both "found responsible" for the scandal by a group of former justices advising the president.

== Death ==
Fernandez died in 1997.

Legal offices
Preceded by Roberto Regala	Associate Justice of the Supreme Court; 27 May 1977–11 May 1982	Succeeded by Lorenzo Relova
