= Enrique Fernando =

Chief Justice of the Philippines from 1979 to 1985

The Honorable Enrique M. Fernando
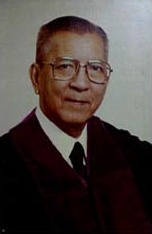

13th Chief Justice of the Supreme Court of the Philippines
- In office July 2, 1979 – July 24, 1985
- Appointed by: Ferdinand Marcos
- Preceded by: Fred Ruiz Castro
- Succeeded by: Felix Makasiar

80th Associate Justice of the Supreme Court of the Philippines
- In office June 30, 1967 – July 1, 1979
- Appointed by: Ferdinand Marcos
- Preceded by: José Maria Paredes
- Succeeded by: Venicio Escolin

Personal details
- Born: Enrique Fausto Medina Fernando; July 25, 1915 Malate, Manila, Philippine Islands
- Died: October 13, 2004 (aged 89) Manila, Philippines
- Spouse: Emma Quisumbing-Fernando

Enrique Fausto Medina Fernando Sr. (July 25, 1915 – October 13, 2004) was the 13th Chief Justice of the Supreme Court of the Philippines. A noted constitutionalist and law professor, he served in the Supreme Court for 18 years, including 6 years as Chief Justice.

== Early career ==
Fernando was born in Malate, Manila. He obtained his Bachelor of Laws degree at the University of the Philippines College of Law, graduating magna cum laude in 1938. He was a member of the Upsilon Sigma Phi fraternity.

Shortly after admission to the bar, he joined the faculty of his alma mater, where he taught as a full-time member of the faculty until 1953, and as a professorial lecturer for decades afterwards. He was eventually appointed as the George A. Malcolm Professor of Constitutional Law. Later, he would also teach constitutional law at the Lyceum of the Philippines. Fernando was feared for his rather tyrannical manner in the classroom, yet many of his law students would emerge as Supreme Court justices or prominent practitioners in their own right.

In 1947, he was admitted by the Yale Law School as the first Filipino Sterling Fellow, earning his Master of Law degree the following year.

Fernando was appointed as a Code Commissioner in 1953 and served in that capacity until 1964. In the 1950s, he served as a Presidential adviser to Presidents Ramon Magsaysay and Carlos P. Garcia. He likewise engaged in an extensive private practice prior to his appointment to the Supreme Court. Among his law partners was Senator Lorenzo Tañada, with whom he would co-author a popular hornbook on constitutional law. In his lifetime, Fernando would author several books on constitutional and administrative law.

== Supreme Court years ==
In 1966, Fernando was appointed as Presidential Legal Counsel by Ferdinand Marcos. The following year, Marcos appointed him to be Associate Justice of the Supreme Court.

If not for the death of Chief Justice Fred Ruiz Castro in 1979, Fernando would have had the opportunity to become the Chief Justice only in 1984, after Castro reached the mandatory retirement age of 70, and serving for only 1 year until his own retirement. However, Castro died suddenly of a heart attack on April 19, 1979, and Fernando, by then the most senior of the Associate Justices, was promoted by Marcos as Chief Justice.

=== Jurisprudence ===
At the time of his appointment to the Court, Fernando was already recognized as one of the country's leading authorities on constitutional law, and as an ardent civil libertarian and active member of the Civil Liberties Union founded by his colleague on the Court, J. B. L. Reyes. He was especially noted for his mastery of American jurisprudence on republicanism and individual rights. He would have ample opportunity to expound on these subjects during his 17-year tenure on the Court.

In Morfe v. Mutuc, 130 Phil. 415 (1968), Fernando wrote for the Court that an anti-graft law requiring the periodic submission by public officials of their statements of assets and liabilities did not infringe on the officer's right to liberty under the Due Process Clause, or on the right to privacy. Nonetheless, Morfe marked the first time the Philippine Supreme Court recognized the existence of a constitutional right to privacy as "accorded recognition independently of its identification with liberty; in itself, it is fully deserving of constitutional protection." The then-recent United States Supreme Court ruling in Griswold v. Connecticut, 381 U.S. 479 (1965) was favorably cited.

Fernando was also a persistent proponent of the clear and present danger test as the only acceptable limitation on the right to free expression, as expressed in his ponencia in Gonzales v. COMELEC, 137 Phil. 471 (1969), and his dissent in Badoy v. Ferrer, 35 SCRA 285 (1970).

=== Controversies ===
Along with Claudio Teehankee Sr., Fernando was the longest-serving of the Justices appointed during the 20-year rule of Ferdinand Marcos. However, unlike Teehankee who progressively became a consistent dissenter to the martial-law rule of Marcos, Fernando frequently voted to affirm challenged acts of the martial law regime. Even though Fernando often qualified his opinions to voice concerns about potential violations of the Bill of Rights, his voting record, as well as his relatively lengthy tenure as Chief Justice during martial law tied him closely with the Marcos regime, and to a Supreme Court perceived as a "lackey of Malacañang". This reputation was further enhanced when Fernando was photographed holding an umbrella to the then First Lady Imelda Marcos, a seeming act of chivalry many considered inappropriate for the Chief Justice of the Supreme Court. Critically, Justice Isagani Cruz observed that "as Chief Justice, Fernando emphasized that one of the important functions of the judiciary was the 'legitimizing' function. This was to be the stand-by excuse of the Court under him whenever it had to sustain the acts of President Marcos."

In March 1982, Associate Justice Ameurfina Melencio-Herrera resigned as chair of the court's examination committee after revealing that the mercantile law grades of Associate Justice Vicente Ericta's son Gustavo, who took the 1981 Philippine Bar Examinations, was changed from 56 to 58 percent prior to publication of the test results to enable him to pass with a general average of 73 and become a fully-pledged lawyer. Fernando subsequently admitted ordering the revision in the younger Ericta's grade but denied allegations of unethical behavior, saying that it was done to correct an "oversight" by the examiner upon the advice of justices Ramon Aquino and Ramon Fernandez, who were prematurely shown Ericta's grades, and citing a similar predicament with one of his sons, who died shortly after passing the bar exam.

Following public uproar and demands for their impeachment, all 14 members of the Supreme Court, including six justices who were not directly involved in the grade tampering, submitted their resignation to President Marcos on May 11. All of them were subsequently reappointed days later by Marcos, except for Ericta and Fernandez, who were both "found responsible" for the scandal by a group of former justices advising the president.

Shortly after the murder of opposition leader Benigno Aquino Jr. in 1983, Marcos named Fernando to head a fact-finding commission tasked with investigating the assassination. The appointment drew controversy due to concerns that it violated the constitutional separation of powers, and also out of concerns that a commission headed by a man so closely identified to the Marcos regime would not be sufficiently independent. Fernando promptly resigned, and retired Court of Appeals Justice Corazon Agrava was appointed to head what became known as the Agrava Fact-Finding Board Commission.

== Later years ==
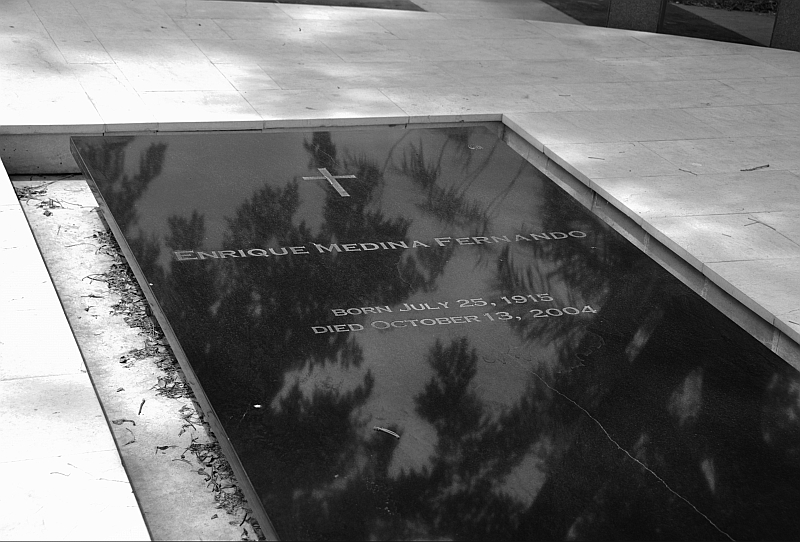
Chief Justice Fernando is interred at the Libingan ng mga Bayani.

Fernando's lengthy service in the Court ended in 1985, when he reached the compulsory retirement age of 70. Marcos would be toppled from power the following year, and Fernando's most prominent rival Teehankee would be named Chief Justice by Corazon Aquino.

Fernando remained in active practice until shortly before his death at the age 89 in 2004. His expertise as amicus curiae was sought by the Court in the controversial case of Manila Prince Hotel v. GSIS, 267 SCRA 408 (1997).

Fernando is buried at the Libingan ng mga Bayani.

== Bibliography ==
=== Selected books ===
- Brief Survey of Administrative Law Including Public Officers and Election Law (with Emma Quisumbing Fernando, 1950)
- Constitution of the Philippines (with Lorenzo Tañada, 1952–1953)
- Law of Public Administration (with Emma Quisumbing Fernando, 1954)
- Labor and Social Legislation (with Gil R. Carlos, 1964)
- The Power of Judicial Review (1968)
- Bill of Rights (1970)
- Jose P. Laurel on the Constitution (1972)
- Bill of Rights and the Revised Constitution (1973)
- American Constitutional Influence in Asia: Its Impact on the Philippine Legal System (1976)
- Perspectives on Human Rights: the Philippines in a Period of Crisis and Transition (1979)
- Cases on the Bill of Rights (1981)
- Cases and Text in Constitutional Law (1984)
- Separation of Powers: The Three Departments of the Philippine Government (1985)

== Notes ==
Legal offices
Preceded by Fred Ruiz Castro	Chief Justice of the Supreme Court of the Philippines; 1979–1985	Succeeded by Felix Makasiar
Preceded by José Maria V. Paredes	Associate Justice of the Supreme Court of the Philippines; 1967–1979	Succeeded by Venicio T. Escolin
