= Roque Desquitado =

Filipino Visayan lawyer, judge, and Congressman of Cebu's 7th District from 1939 to 1941

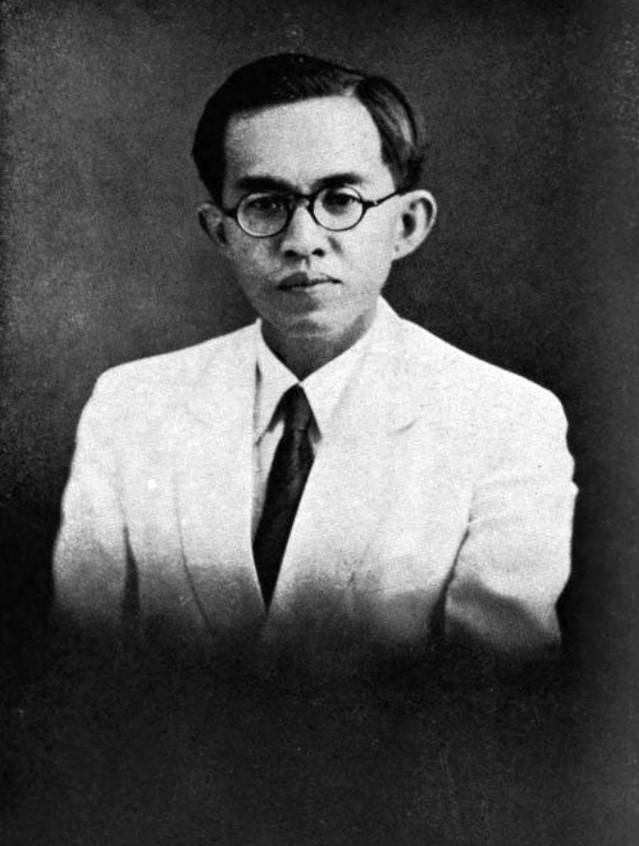
- Photograph from The Commercial & Industrial Manual of the Philippines, 1941

Member of the House of the Representatives for Cebu's 7th District
- In office January 24, 1939 – December 16, 1941
- Preceded by: Buenaventura Rodriguez
- Succeeded by: Jose V. Rodriguez

Personal details
- Born: August 3, 1897 Bantayan, Cebu, Captaincy General of the Philippines
- Party: Nacionalista (1939-?)
- Other political affiliations: Democrata (1925-1939)
- Education: University of the Philippines
- Profession: Lawyer; Judge

Roque Villarino Desquitado (August 3, 1897) was a Filipino Visayan lawyer, judge, and legislator from Cebu, Philippines. He served as Member of the House of Representatives for 7th congressional district of Cebu from 1939 to 1941.

== Early life and education ==
Roque Desquitado was born in Bantayan, Cebu on August 13, 1897, to Mariano Desquitado and Dorotea Villarino. He took up law at the University of the Philippines and became a lawyer on November 5, 1923. He was the third Cebuano to achieve the highest marks in the bar exams (after Paulino Gullas and Cesar Kintanar), and the first from outside of Cebu City.

== Career ==
He practiced law as a profession and was the counsel of Development Bank of the Philippines on its complaint involving a loan transaction against Dionisio Mirang. For a short length of time, he was the law partner of Vicente Sotto.

On June 2, 1925, he ran under Partido Democrata as representative of Cebu's old 7th legislative district but lost to Paulino Ybañez. In 1928, he campaigned for the same congressional seat but withdrew his candidacy before the election. Switching political party to Nacionalista Party, he won the elections and served as representative of the same district for the 2nd National Assembly from January 24, 1939, to December 16, 1941.

He worked as Judge of the Court of First Instance in the province of Bohol, which was the Eight Judicial District. On September 24, 1943, the Department of Justice granted him the authority to hold court in Cebu City and in the province of Cebu.
