= Vicente Abad Santos =

Associate Justice of the Supreme Court of the Philippines

The Honorable Vicente Abad Santos
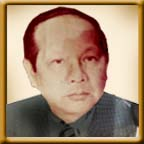

96th Associate Justice of the Supreme Court of the Philippines
- In office January 17, 1979 (Note: Reappointed to the Court on April 3, 1986.) – July 12, 1986
- Appointed by: Ferdinand Marcos
- Preceded by: Fred Ruiz Castro
- Succeeded by: Abraham Sarmiento

Secretary of Justice
- In office August 2, 1970 – January 16, 1979
- President: Ferdinand Marcos
- Preceded by: Felix Makasiar
- Succeeded by: Catalino Macaraig Jr.

Member of the Interim Batasang Pambansa
- In office June 12, 1978 – January 17, 1979
- Constituency: Region III

Personal details
- Born: July 12, 1916 Concepcion, Tarlac, Philippine Islands
- Died: December 30, 1993 (aged 77) Manila, Philippines
- Party: Kilusang Bagong Lipunan
- Relations: José Abad Santos (uncle); Pedro Abad Santos (uncle); Jamby Madrigal (niece)
- Education: University of the Philippines Manila (LL.B); Harvard University (LL.M)
- Occupation: Politician
- Profession: Lawyer, jurist

Vicente Abad Santos (Spanish: [ˈbiˈsente aˈβað ˈsantos]: 12 July 1916 – 30 December 1993) was a Filipino jurist who served as an Associate Justice of the Supreme Court of the Philippines.

== Profile ==
Abad Santos was born in Concepcion, Tarlac, to a single mother Escolastica Abad Santos. The two maternal uncles were prominent Filipinos during the American period, Chief Justice José Abad Santos, and his brother Pedro, a leading socialist leader during the Commonwealth era.

Abad Santos earned his bachelor's degree and degree in law at the University of the Philippines in Manila before earning a master's degree at Harvard Law School in the United States. He joined the faculty of the University of the Philippines College of Law in 1945. After serving briefly as a trial court judge from 1954 to 1958, he rejoined the faculty of the University of the Philippines College of Law as its dean in 1958. He would serve as dean for the next 13 years until late 1970.

== Public service ==
Abad Santos was appointed Secretary (later Minister) of Justice by President Ferdinand Marcos in 1970. He would serve in that capacity until January 1979. As early as June 1977, he was appointed to the Supreme Court, but he deferred accepting the appointment until January 17, 1979, when he was finally seated on the High Court.

Long viewed as a supporter of Ferdinand Marcos, he displayed considerable independence from the Marcos government once he was seated on the Supreme Court. By 1986, he was asked by the anti-Marcos opposition to swear into office Corazon Aquino's vice-presidential candidate Salvador Laurel at the height of the EDSA Revolution. When Aquino assumed the presidency on February 25, 1986, she asked for the resignation of the incumbent justices of the Supreme Court to allow her a free hand in reorganizing the Court. Abad Santos and fellow incumbent Justice Claudio Teehankee were the President's first two appointments to the reorganized Supreme Court. However, Abad Santos retired shortly after, in July 1986, upon reaching the mandatory retirement age of 70.

== See also ==
- José Abad Santos
- Pedro Abad Santos

== Notes ==
Preceded by Fred Ruiz Castro	Associate Justice of the Supreme Court of the Philippines; 1979–1986	Succeeded by Abraham Sarmiento
Preceded by Vicente G. Sinco	Dean of the U.P. College of Law; 1958–1970	Succeeded by Irene R. Cortes
