= George A. Malcolm =

Philippine Supreme Court justice (1881–1961)

The Honorable George Arthur Malcolm
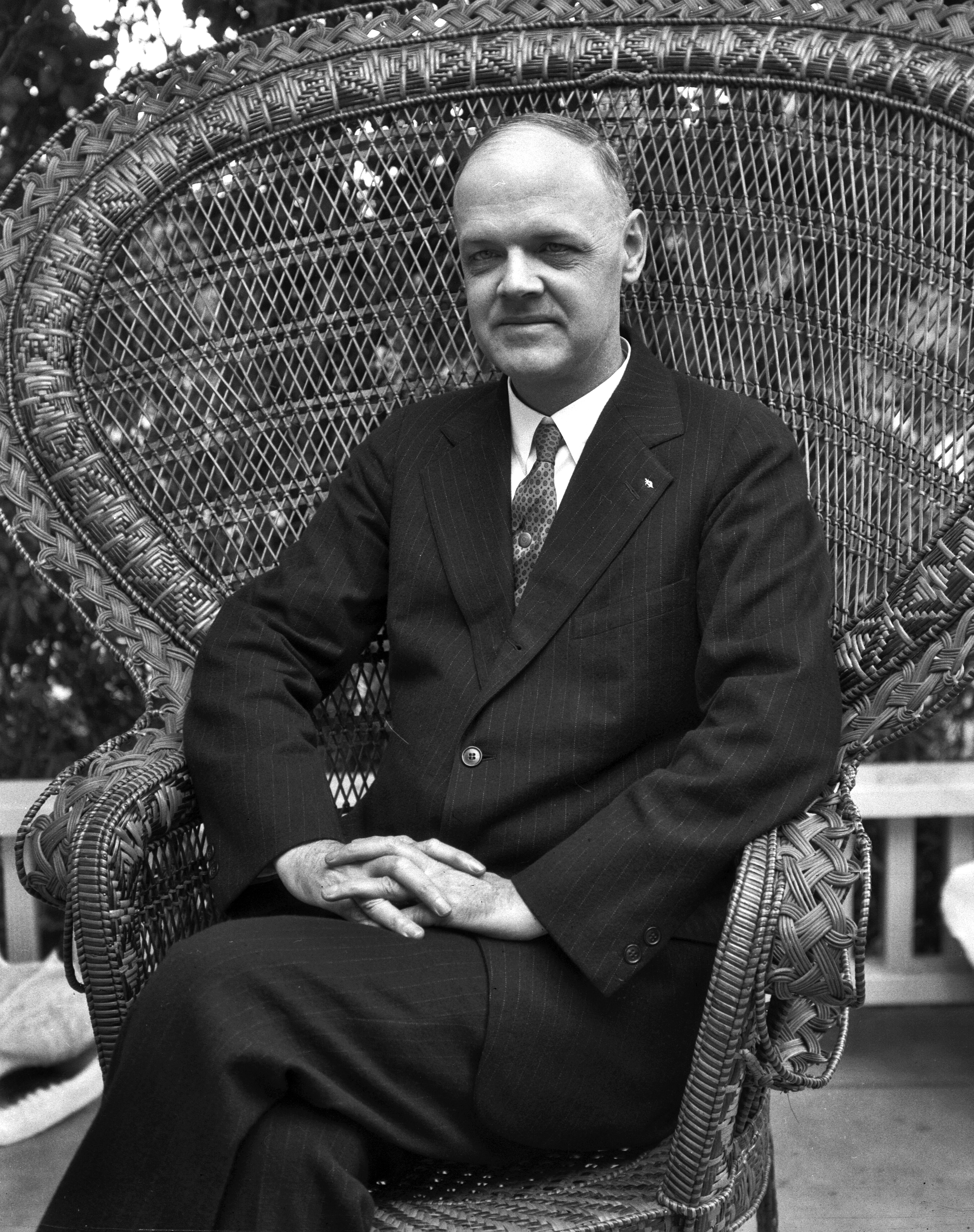
- Malcolm in 1926

17th Associate Justice of the Philippine Supreme Court
- In office October 11, 1917 – February 1, 1936
- Appointed by: Woodrow Wilson
- Preceded by: Grant T. Trent
- Succeeded by: Jose P. Laurel

Personal details
- Born: November 5, 1881 Concord, Michigan
- Died: May 16, 1961 (aged 79) Los Angeles, California
- Spouse: Lucille Margaret (Wolf) Malcolm
- Education: University of Michigan

George Arthur Malcolm (November 5, 1881 — May 16, 1961) was an American lawyer who emerged as an influential figure in the development of the practice of law in the Philippines in the 20th century. Constitutional scholar and academic Joaquin Bernas described Malcolm as "the man who more than any single American contributed most to early constitutional development in the Philippines." At age 35, he was appointed Associate Justice of the Supreme Court of the Philippines, where he would serve for 19 years. His most enduring legacy perhaps lies in his role in the establishment of the College of Law at the University of the Philippines.

== Background ==
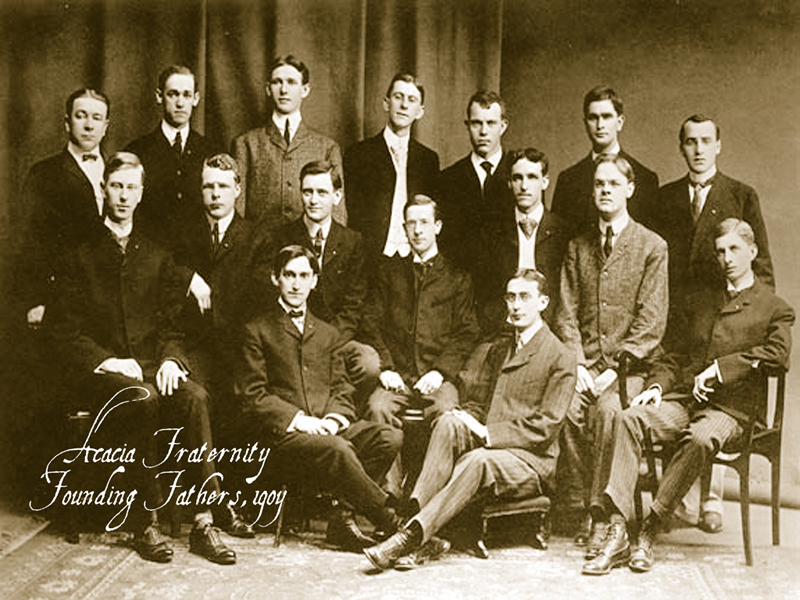
Malcolm (2nd row, 2nd from right), pictured in 1904 together with fellow founding members of the Acacia fraternity.

Born in Concord, Michigan, Malcolm obtained his degree in law from the University of Michigan in 1906. While at the university, he was among the founding members of the Acacia fraternity.

Following his graduation, Malcolm proceeded to the Philippines, which was then a colony of the United States. Malcolm served in several minor positions in the colonial government, starting as a clerk in the Bureau of Health, then subsequently in the Bureau of Justice. He rose quickly in rank, and by 1911, he was acting attorney-general for the Philippines.

== Establishment of the U.P. College of Law ==
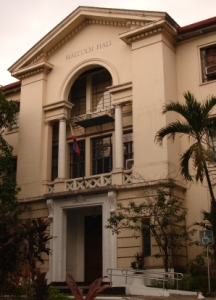
Malcolm Hall at the U.P. Diliman campus.

It was through Malcolm's efforts that the first English language law classes were established in the Philippines. The Board of Regents of the University of the Philippines had initially resisted Malcolm's proposal for the establishment of a law college within the University. Malcolm thus arranged for the Manila YMCA to offer law courses, which commenced in 1910. Malcolm acted as the Secretary of these law courses. Within a year, the Board of Regents relented and the University of the Philippines adopted these classes by formally establishing the College of Law on January 12, 1911.

Supreme Court Associate Justice Sherman Moreland had initially been designated as the acting dean of the college, while Malcolm was appointed as the College Secretary. Almost immediately, Moreland turned over his office to Malcolm, who served as acting dean while the University tried in vain to recruit American law professors to become the permanent dean of the college. While there was some resistance in the idea of appointing Malcolm as the first permanent Dean of the College of Law, Malcolm was finally appointed to the post on October 11, 1911.

Malcolm served as dean for the next six years. He also taught courses in constitutional law and in legal ethics. Three students who graduated during his deanship would eventually become Presidents of the Philippines — José P. Laurel, Manuel Roxas, and Elpidio Quirino. Several other of Malcolm's students would later serve in the Supreme Court, including also Laurel, who would actually succeed to Malcolm's seat on the Supreme Court in 1936.

Following the relocation of the university campus to Diliman, Quezon City after World War II, the building that housed the College of Law was named "Malcolm Hall" after Malcolm, a name that is carried as to this day.

== Supreme Court Justice ==
In 1917, U.S. President Woodrow Wilson appointed Malcolm to sit on the Philippine Supreme Court. At age 35, he was the youngest person ever appointed as Justice to the High Court. He would serve in the Court until 1936, when he was forced to retire upon the enactment of the 1935 Constitution, which limited Supreme Court membership to Filipinos. Upon his retirement after 19 years, Malcolm had written 3,340 opinions for the Court.

Several of Malcolm's opinions for the Court remain influential to date. In Villavicencio v. Lukban, 39 Phil. 778 (1919), he spoke for the Court in granting the writ of habeas corpus to counter the deportation of prostitutes to Mindanao as ordered by Manila mayor Justo Lukban. In Villaflor v. Summers, 41 Phil. 62 (1920), Malcolm wrote that a judicial order compelling a woman to submit to a physical examination to determine if she was pregnant did not violate the constitutional proscription against self-incrimination. In Borromeo v. Mariano, 41 Phil. 329 (1921), and Concepcion v. Paredes, 42 Phil. 499 (1921), Malcolm authored opinions that shielded the members of the judiciary from the diminution of their powers by legislative action. In Alejandrino v. Quezon, 46 Phil. 83 (1924), the Court through Malcolm ruled it had no power to reverse the suspension of a senator by his colleagues in the Senate. In Government v. Springer, Malcolm refused to affirm the law that granted the Senate President and Speaker of the House the right to vote shares in a government corporation, citing that such authority did not fall within the functions of the legislature. Malcolm's opinion would be affirmed by the Supreme Court of the United States upon appellate review, 277 U.S. 189 (1928), though the dissent therein of Justice Oliver Wendell Holmes Jr. proved more memorable in time, with its eloquent pronouncement that "[t]he great ordinances of the Constitution do not establish and divide fields of black and white. Even the more specific of them are found to terminate in a penumbra shading gradually from one extreme to the other."

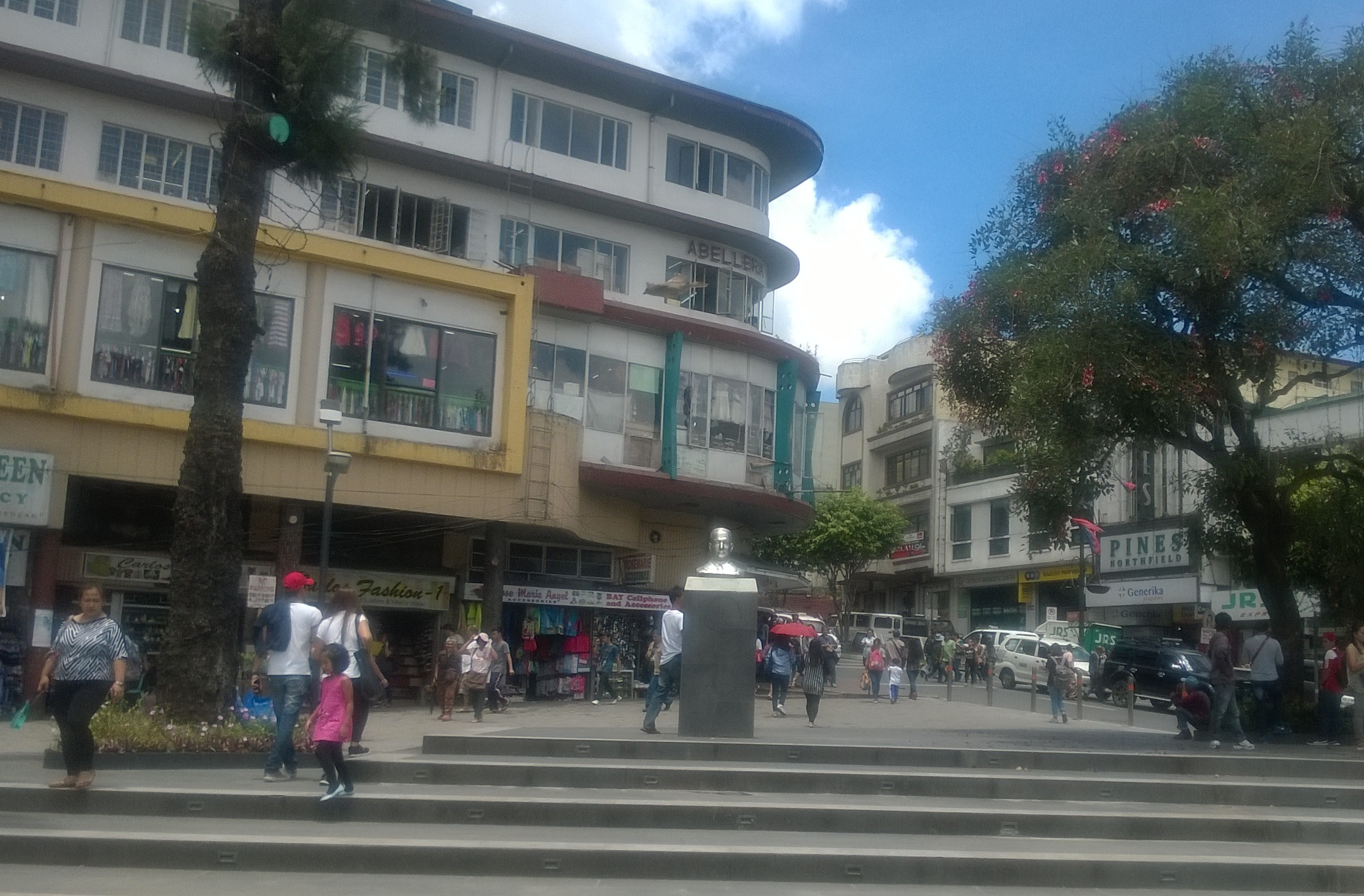
Malcolm Square in central Baguio 2017

Malcolm's majority opinion in Rubi v. Provincial Board, 33 Phil. 660 (1919), remains controversial to date. The Court therein affirmed a provincial government resolution directed at the Mangyan ethnic minority, requiring the confinement of members of "non-Christian tribes" to a specially created reservation. Likening the plight of the Mangyan to that of Native Americans, the Court classified the Mangyan as "wards of the Filipino". "By the fostering care of a wise Government, may not these unfortunates advance in the "habits and arts of civilization?" Would it be advisable for the courts to intrude upon a plan, carefully formulated, and apparently working out for the ultimate good of these people?"

In Baguio housing the summer quarters of the Supreme Court, the city square on Session Road near the public market is named Malcolm Square in his honor, and a bronze bust of Malcolm is located in the square.

== Later years ==
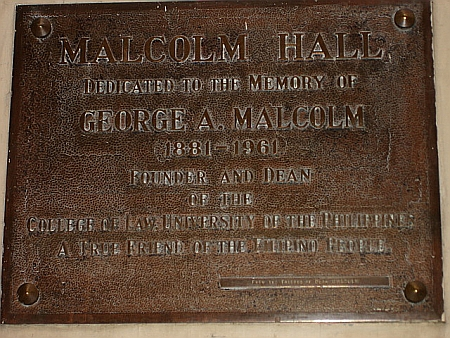
Plaque Commemorating George Malcolm at the U.P. College of Law

After his retirement from the Philippine Supreme Court, Malcolm was appointed as a legal adviser to U.S. High Commissioners Frank Murphy and Paul V. McNutt. In 1939, he was appointed as Attorney General of Puerto Rico. However, he would later fall into dispute with Governor Rexford Tugwell, and he ended up being fired in 1942.

A collection of Malcolm's papers, including series relating to his service in the Philippines and in Puerto Rico, is housed at the Bentley Historical Library at the University of Michigan and open for research.

== Personal life ==
In 1932 at age 51, long-time bachelor Malcolm married Lucille Margaret Wolf, age 27, on December 13, 1932. Lucille detailed their ship-board courtship and "her front row seat to history" during their nearly 30-year marriage in her memoir, My Touch of the Elephant, made publicly available for the first time in 2020. They had a daughter, Mary MacKenzie Malcolm Leydorf, was born of November 14, 1934.

Malcolm was a godfather to Ameurfina Melencio-Herrera who, in 1979, became the second woman to be appointed to the Supreme Court.

As a sign of great respect for him by the Philippine legal community, he was granted honorary Philippine citizenship by the Philippine Congress in 1955. Malcolm later settled back in the United States, though he would make occasional visits to the Philippines and to the law school housed in the building named after him. He died aged 79 in Los Angeles on May 16, 1961.

== Selected opinions ==
- US v. Salaveria (1917)
- Rubi v. Provincial Government (1919)
- Villavicencio v. Lukban (1919)
- Villaflor v. Summers (1920)
- Alejandrino v. Quezon (1924)
- Government v. Springer (1927)
- Government v. Agoncillo (1927)

Academic offices
Preceded by none	Dean of the U.P. College of Law; 1911–1917	Succeeded by Jorge C. Bocobo
Legal offices
Preceded by Grant T. Trent	Associate Justice of the Supreme Court of the Philippines; 1917–1936	Succeeded by José P. Laurel
