= Ramon Aquino =

Chief Justice of the Philippines from 1985 to 1987

The Honorable Ramon C. Aquino
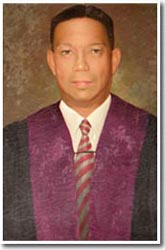

15th Chief Justice of the Supreme Court of the Philippines
- In office November 20, 1985 – March 6, 1986
- Appointed by: Ferdinand E. Marcos
- Preceded by: Felix Makasiar
- Succeeded by: Claudio Teehankee

90th Associate Justice of the Supreme Court of the Philippines
- In office October 29, 1973 – November 19, 1985
- Appointed by: Ferdinand E. Marcos
- Preceded by: Newly created seat
- Succeeded by: Pedro Yap

Personal details
- Born: August 31, 1917 Lemery, Batangas, Philippine Islands
- Died: March 31, 1993 (aged 75) Manila, Philippines
- Spouse: Carolina Griño
- Education: University of the Philippines

Ramon Caguicla Aquino (August 31, 1917 – March 31, 1993) was the 15th Chief Justice of the Supreme Court of the Philippines.

He was appointed on November 20, 1985, the last Chief Justice appointed by President Ferdinand Marcos.

== Personal life ==
Aquino was born on August 31, 1917, in Lemery, Batangas, to Luciano Aquino and Arsenia Caguicla. He obtained his Bachelor of Laws from the University of the Philippines (UP) in 1939 in the top ten, while classmate Ferdinand Marcos was lower in the list, and Aquino placed sixth in the 1939 bar exam, with a grade of 89.1%.

Aquino married Carolina Griño, the 1950 Bar topnotcher who would be the fourth appointed Associate Justice of the Supreme Court (1988–1993), serving until her retirement. They had four children.

He was a law professor and author of several books in civil, criminal and commercial laws. He held several government positions before becoming part of the Supreme Court.

Aquino, prior to his installation at the judiciary, worked as a professor at the UP.

== Legal career ==
=== As an Associate Justice (1973–1985) ===
On October 29, 1973, Aquino was appointed by President Ferdinand Marcos, his former law school classmate, as Associate Justice of the Supreme Court, along with Estanislao Fernandez and Cecilia Muñoz-Palma.

=== As Chief Justice (1985–1986) ===
On November 19, 1985, Aquino was appointed by Marcos as Chief Justice, replacing Felix Makasiar—also his former law school classmate—who was to retire the following day. Both Makasiar (appointed in July) and Aquino were selected while bypassing the most senior justice and the president's critic, Associate Justice Claudio Teehankee. His appointment was criticized by human rights lawyers which alleged that the president was "institutionalizing judicial cronyism."

==== Notable SC rulings under his leadership ====
Hours prior to his appointment as Chief Justice, Aquino, along with Makasiar, were the only justices who favored the dismissal of the petition for mistrial in connection with the 1983 assassination of Ninoy Aquino, (Note: Ramon Aquino is not related to the Aquino couple, Ninoy and Corazon.) against nine others who moved to order a lower court to withhold the scheduled verdict for the former to further study the petition. The petition, which claimed Marcos interfered in the trial, was dismissed on November 28 with a 9–2 vote; with Aquino saying it lacked legal basis.

On January 7, 1986, the court voted, 7–5 (with Aquino affirming), to dismiss all eleven petitions which sought to nullify Batas Pambansa 883 that set the February 7 special national elections for president and vice president. The election later became controversial as Marcos was proclaimed winner, defeating Corazon Aquino.

==== People Power Revolution; CJ Aquino's resignation ====
During the February 1986 revolution, Aquino administered Marcos' oath of office for his fourth term, in a ceremony held in the Malacañang Palace, which was proceeded as the live television broadcast had been interrupted a few moments prior. Marcos was eventually ousted hours after the inauguration.

At the beginning of the Aquino presidency, Justice Aquino responded to the president's call less than a week earlier for the resignation of the entire Supreme Court. He was replaced by Teehankee on March 6.

== Controversies ==
While being an Associate Justice, Aquino and his four fellow justices, including Vicente Ericta, Ramon Fernandez, and then Chief Justice Enrique Fernando, were directly implicated in a scandal where the grade of Ericta's son, earned in the 1981 bar examination, was allegedly revised for him to pass. All justices either denied involvement or said that there was nothing wrong in such action. President Marcos accepted the resignations of all 14 justices in May 1982; but swore in a new court days later, with all justices reinstated to their respective positions except for Ericta and Fernandez which were "found responsible" for the changing of grade.

== Notes ==
Preceded by Felix Makasiar	Chief Justice of the Supreme Court of the Philippines; 1985 – 1987	Succeeded by Claudio Teehankee, Sr.
Preceded by Newly created seat	Associate Justice of the Supreme Court of the Philippines; 1973–1985	Succeeded by Pedro Yap
