= Cesar Kintanar =

Filipino lawyer and Constitutional Convention delegate

The Honourable Cesar A. Kintanar
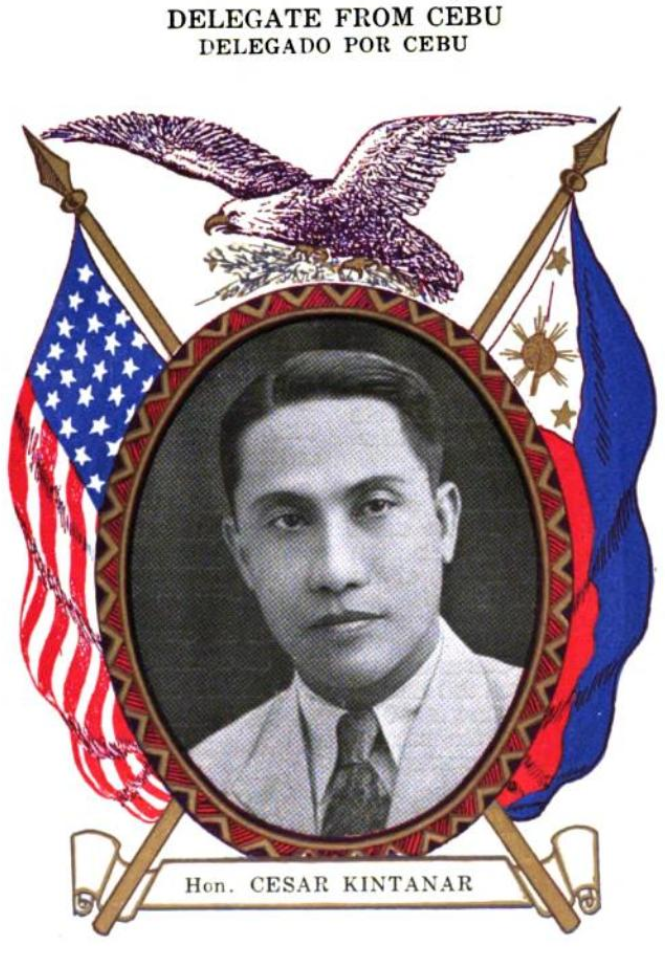
- Photograph published from Benipayo Press, c. 1935

Delegate to the 1934 Constitutional Convention
- In office 1934–1935

Personal details
- Born: April 24, 1902
- Education: University of the Philippines
- Profession: Lawyer; Judge

Cesar Abear Kintanar (born April 24, 1902) was a Filipino Visayan lawyer, judge, and 1934 Constitutional Convention delegate from Cebu, Philippines.

== Early life ==
Cesar A. Kintanar was born on April 24, 1902. The son of Aquilina Abear and Felipe Kintanar, the Teniente Premiero (now Vice Mayor) of the municipality of Argao, Cebu from 1917 to 1920, he attended school in Argao and then later in the Junior College of University of the Philippines Cebu. Acquiring a law degree from the University of the Philippines in Manila, he got the highest score in the bar examination held in 1927 and became a lawyer on January 3, 1928. He was married to Crescenciana Espina.

== Career ==
=== Legal practice ===
Kintanar was involved in legal education being a professor of law at the Visayan Institute. He also became the Assistant Fiscal of the Court of First Instance in Negros Occidental, and then later he was appointed Judge.

=== Politics ===
He previously served as vice mayor of the municipality of Argao and was replaced by Pedro Villamor Ceballos.

The Constitutional Convention of 1934 was composed of elected delegates tasked to draft the 1935 Philippine Constitution. There were fourteen slots for delegates in Cebu, two for each of the seven legislative districts. Kintanar was elected to the Constitutional Convention.

=== Journalism ===
He was the editor of the Cebu periodical named Progress.
