= Hugo Gutierrez Jr. =

Filipino justice (1927–2013)

The Honorable Hugo E. Gutierrez Jr.

104th Associate Justice of the Supreme Court of the Philippines
- In office May 14, 1982 – March 13, 1993
- Appointed by: Ferdinand Marcos; Corazon Aquino
- Preceded by: Vicente Ericta
- Succeeded by: Reynato Puno

Personal details
- Born: January 29, 1927 Lubao, Pampanga, Philippine Islands
- Died: June 12, 2013 (aged 86)
- Education: University of the Philippines (BA); University of the Philippines (LLB)

Hugo Espiritu Gutierrez Jr. (January 29, 1927 – June 12, 2013) was a Filipino jurist and civil liberties advocate. Gutierrez served as an Associate Justice of the Supreme Court of the Philippines from May 14, 1982, until March 31, 1993, when he resigned because of plagiarism that dealt with a decision in a Supreme Court case between Eastern Telecommunications Philippines and PLDT.

== Biography ==
Gutierrez was born in Lubao, Pampanga, on January 29, 1927. He finished his primary education in Lubao and secondary education at the Pampanga High School in San Fernando. At the end of the Second World War, he briefly worked as a shipping clerk for the US Army Forces, Western Pacific before obtaining his pre-law and law degrees at the University of the Philippines in 1952.

After passing the bar examinations in 1952, Gutierrez worked as a legal supervisor in the US Veterans Administration handling claims from war veterans. In 1960, he joined the Philippine government as a bureaucrat in the Social Security System. In 1967, he began teaching law at the University of the Philippines until 1973. During his tenure, he was also appointed by President Ferdinand Marcos to become executive director of the Presidential Investigation and Recovery Commission from 1971 to 1973. In 1973, he was appointed as Assistant Solicitor General before joining the Court of Appeals in 1977.

Gutierrez was appointed to the Supreme Court by President Ferdinand Marcos in 1982. He and his fellow Supreme Court justices resigned from the High Court following the People Power Revolution in 1986, which ousted Marcos and brought Corazon Aquino to power. Gutierrez was one of just three sitting justices who were reappointed to the Supreme Court by President Aquino following her reorganization of the court.

== Resignation ==
In 1992, Gutierrez penned a decision ruling in favor of the Philippine Long Distance Telephone Company (PLDT) in its efforts to prevent its rival in the telecommunications sector, Eastern Telecommunications, from opening an international gateway. In 1993, an investigation by the Philippine Center for Investigative Journalism found that Gutierrez had plagiarized his opinion from a draft written by a legal counsel of PLDT. This plagiarism was initially uncovered by a young attorney, Arthur Lim, who subsequently became a member of the Commission on Elections (COMELEC). The resulting scandal led to Gutierrez's resignation days later. However, he was subsequently exonerated of wrongdoing by a committee of the Supreme Court, which instead held Emil Jurado, a Manila Standard columnist who also wrote about the issue, in contempt of court.

== Later life and death ==
In his later years, Gutierrez served as a lecturer at the Philippine Judicial Academy and became chair of its Constitutional Law Department in the 2000s.

Gutierrez died from complications related to diabetes on June 12, 2013, at the age of 86. He was laid in state at the Sanctuarium on Araneta Avenue in Quezon City before being buried in Pampanga.

Legal offices
Preceded by Vicente Ericta	Associate Justice of the Supreme Court; 14 May 1982–13 March 1993	Succeeded by Reynato Puno
