= Pedro Yap =

Chief Justice of the Philippines in 1988

The Honorable Pedro López Yap
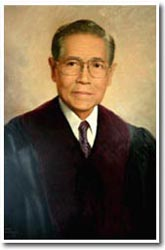

17th Chief Justice of the Supreme Court of the Philippines
- In office April 19, 1988 – June 30, 1988
- Appointed by: Corazon Aquino
- Preceded by: Claudio Teehankee Sr.
- Succeeded by: Marcelo Fernan

110th Associate Justice of the Supreme Court of the Philippines
- In office April 8, 1986 – April 18, 1988
- Appointed by: Corazon Aquino
- Preceded by: Ramon Aquino
- Succeeded by: Leo Medialdea

Commissioner of the Presidential Commission on Good Government
- In office February 28, 1986 – April 8, 1986

Personal details
- Born: July 1, 1918 San Isidro, Leyte, Philippine Islands
- Died: November 20, 2003 (aged 85) California, United States

Pedro López Yap (July 1, 1918 – November 20, 2003) was the Chief Justice of the Supreme Court of the Philippines in 1988. He briefly served for two and a half months from April 19, 1988, to June 30, 1988, the shortest in history until Chief Justice Teresita de Castro surpassed that record. He worked in the notable Salonga, Ordoñez, Yap & Associates Law Offices, named after Jovito Salonga and Justice Secretary Sedfrey Ordoñez.

He served as a delegate to the 1971 Constitutional Convention, where he proposed the inclusion of an Article on Socio-economic Rights. On February 14, 1976, his 24-year-old son Manny was taken by military authorities in Quezon City during martial law and disappeared.

== Early life ==
Yap was born in San Isidro, Leyte, in July 1918 to an ethnic Chinese father and his native Leytena wife. It was also from that town that he earned his elementary education and went to Cebu for his secondary education at the Cebu Provincial High School or what is now known as the Abellana National School. He then went to UP Manila to take his Bachelor of Laws (he was Cum Laude). He topped the Bar examinations given in 1946 and was admitted to the Bar on March 29, 1947, topping the examinations with a grade of 91.7 percent.

Chief Justice Yap is among the first Visayans (although he was of Chinese descent) to be sent to the United States for further studies in law. He then enrolled at New York University (NYU) earning a Master of Laws specializing in International Law. He later obtained a Doctor of Juridical Science also at NYU, thus starting his career as a diplomat.

== Career ==
As a trial lawyer, Yap worked as a partner at Salonga, Ordoñez, Yap and Associates Law Office from 1967 to 1985. Yap also taught law at the University of San Carlos in Cebu from 1949 until 1985 and became one of its trustees.

Yap began his governmental career as a diplomat and served as the United Nations Human Rights Commission secretary. He was one of the delegates representing the 2nd District of Cebu in the 1971 Constitutional Convention. He was one of the 16 delegates who refused to sign the 1973 Philippine Constitution. However, he was able to include an article on socio-economic rights in the proposed draft before martial law was declared and revised to extend Marcos's rule. He was appointed to the Presidential Commission on Good Government in 1986 before being appointed associate justice.

In 1988, Yap became the Chief Justice, replacing Claudio Teehankee and was the second ethnic Chinese officeholder (although he had half Waray blood through his maternal side, the Lópezes of Leyte), the first being his predecessor, Claudio (who was a full-blooded Chinese from Manila being born to an emigrant father from Fujian province and his local-born wife of Chinese descent).

Legal offices
Preceded by Claudio Teehankee	Chief Justice of the Supreme Court of the Philippines; April 19-June 30, 1988	Succeeded by Marcelo Fernan
Preceded by Ramon Aquino	Associate Justice of the Supreme Court of the Philippines; 1967–1979	Succeeded by Leo Medialdea
