= University of the Philippines College of Law =

Law school of the University of the Philippines Diliman

- Parent school: University of the Philippines Diliman
- Established: January 12, 1911
- School type: Public
- Dean: Gwen Grecia-de Vera
- Location: Malcolm Hall, Osmeña Avenue, UP Diliman, Quezon City (main campus); Bonifacio Global City 32nd/38th Street, Taguig City, Philippines
- Enrollment: 727
- Faculty: 20 (full-time); 79 (part-time)
- Bar pass rate: 94.63% (2025)
- Website: law.upd.edu.ph

The University of the Philippines College of Law (often referred to as UP Law) is the law school of the University of the Philippines Diliman. Formally established in 1911 in UP Manila, it is the third oldest continually-operating law school in the Philippines. Since 1948, it has been based in UP Diliman in Quezon City, the flagship of the UP System's eight constituent universities. The college also holds extension classes at the Bonifacio Global City campus of UP Diliman in Taguig and the Iloilo City campus of UP Visayas.

UP Law is noted for having produced the largest number of bar topnotchers and maintaining one of the highest bar passing rates among law schools in the Philippines.

== History ==
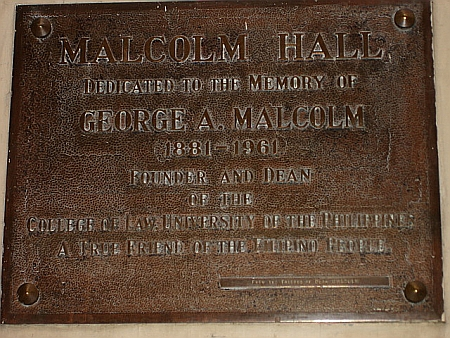
George A. Malcolm is commemorated in a plaque that graces the front entrance of the college.

Deans of the
University of the Philippines
College of Law
George A. Malcolm, 1913-1917
Jorge Bocobo, 1917-1934
Jose A. Espiritu, 1934-1953
Vicente G. Sinco, 1954-1958
Vicente Abad Santos,1958–1970
Perfecto V. Fernandez,1970 (officer-in-charge)
Irene Cortes, 1970–1978
Froilan M. Bacungan, 1978–1983
Bartolome S. Carale, 1983–1989
Pacifico A. Agabin, 1989–1995
Merlin M. Magallona, 1995–1999
Raul Pangalangan, 1999–2005
Salvador T. Carlota, 2005–2008
Marvic Leonen, 2008-2011
Danilo Concepcion, 2011–2018
Fides C. Cordero-Tan, 2018–2021
Edgardo Carlo L. Vistan II, 2021–2023
Darlene Marie B. Berberabe, 2023–2025
Gwen Grecia-de Vera, 2025-Present

It was George Malcolm who had first proposed the establishment of the College of Law within the University of the Philippines system. However, the Board of Regents of the University of the Philippines had initially resisted the proposal. Malcolm thus arranged for the Manila YMCA to offer law courses, which commenced in 1910. Malcolm acted as the Secretary of these law courses. Within a year, the Board of Regents relented and the University of the Philippines adopted these classes by formally establishing the College of Law on January 12, 1911. The college was formally opened in with fifty (50) Filipino and American students.

Justice Sherman Moreland of the Philippine Supreme Court, the first acting Dean of the college, eventually declined to take on the position full-time. He was thus replaced by Malcolm, who served until his appointment as an Associate Justice of the Philippine Supreme Court in 1917.

In 1964, the University of the Philippines Law Center was established as an agency attached to the college of law, the University of the Philippines Law Center was created to conduct continuing legal education programs, as well as legal research and publications.

In the 1960s up to the 1980s, the four-year law program consisted of one-hundred-twenty-two (122) units which emphasize the eight bar subjects listed in the Revised Rules of Court: civil law, criminal law, remedial law, legal ethics and legal forms, commercial law, political law, tax law, labor law, public corporation and public officers, and international law. The program also included non-bar subjects such as legal history, legal bibliography, statutory construction, jurisprudence, trial techniques, thesis and legal research, legal medicine, and practice court.

In addition to Philippine laws and jurisprudence, foreign legal materials from Spain, the United States and other Asian countries were integrated into the curriculum. Students were introduced to basic principles of Roman civil law, English common law, and other international legal systems.

In 1988, the college launched a core-elective curriculum, permitting law students to enroll up to twenty (20) percent of their total academic load for elective subjects. The effort was made to incorporate specializations in legal education. In 1989, the college followed a revised model law curriculum adopted by the Philippine Department of Education. The program composed of 51 subjects (124 academic units) which took effect in 1990. It offered additional non-bar subjects such as legal profession, legal ethics, legal counselling, legal research, and legal writing.

The UP College of Law (which has no summa cum laude graduate) had five of its seventeen magna cum laude graduates (the College of Law first conferred the honor to Rafael Dinglasan in 1925 and, to date, last conferred the same honor to Danica Mae Godornes in 2021, who passed the bar in early 2022) place number one in their respective bar exams: Rafael Dinglasan in 1925, Lorenzo Sumulong in 1929, Deogracias Eufemio in 1962, Roberto San Jose in 1966, and Ronaldo Zamora in 1969. Dinglasan became a Judge of the Court of First Instance of Manila; Sumulong became Senator of the Republic and a renowned statesman; Eufemio became a known corporate lawyer appearing in court, and in the 1980s the Corporate Secretary of the conglomerate, "Philippine Feeds Milling, Co."; while San Jose established his successful private law firm Castillo, Laman, Tan, Pantaleon & San Jose. Zamora became Executive Secretary to then President Joseph Estrada and Minority Leader in the House of Representatives. In recognition of the college as "the country’s premier institution in providing quality legal education" and in honor of its "significant contributions to national development since it was founded in 1911," President Benigno Aquino III declared 2011 as the "University of the Philippines College of Law Centennial Year" and authorized, among others, the creation of commemorative stamps by the Philippine Postal Corporation.

== Programs and admissions ==
The college first conferred the Juris Doctor (J.D.) on its April 2008 graduates, after a change in degree title was approved by the U.P. administration the previous year. Like the majority of law schools in the country, UP used to provide the Bachelor of Laws (LL.B.), a standard four-year law program covering all subjects in the bar exams, until the change to J.D. was made in order to reflect more accurately the U.P. law program being a "professional as well as a post baccalaureate degree." The college has relaunched its Master of Laws program in August 2019.

At an average of 8%, the college has the lowest admission rate among Philippine law schools. The criteria for admissions include the aggregate of weights assigned to an applicant's scores in the Law Aptitude Examination and undergraduate General Weighted Average (GWA), in addition to the scores obtained during an in-person interview with the admissions committee composed of faculty members.

Through the Law Center, the college conducts Mandatory Continuing Legal Education programs for the members of the Philippine Bar, consisting of a series of seminars on various aspects of the legal and judicial profession offered throughout the year. The college also hosts various conferences, fora, colloquia and workshops, which serve as formal and informal channels of communication, information, and education provided by the Law Center.

== Rankings ==
UP Law has been ranked as "still the best law school in the Philippines" by the Legal Education Board in its ranking of top performing law schools in 2015 based on cumulative performance of law schools in the 2012, 2013 and 2014 Bar examinations. It was likewise the country's top performing law school, with a passing rate of 89.73%, in the 2015 bar exams.

Since 2019, UP Law is ranked 251–300 in the QS World University Rankings among all law schools in the world. It is the sole Philippine law school in the list.

== Campuses ==
=== The UP Law Complex ===
==== Malcolm Hall ====
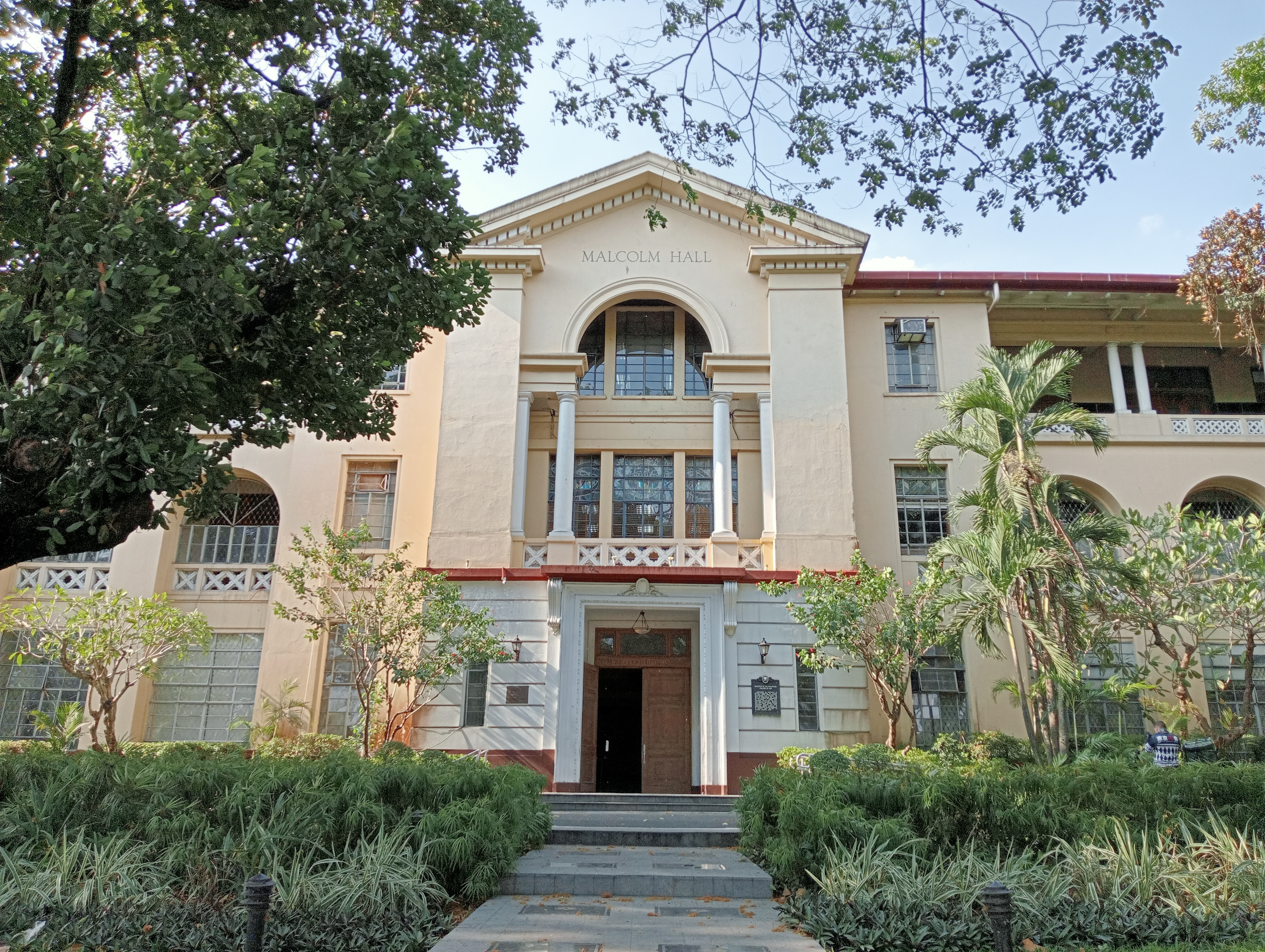
Malcolm Hall

The main offices and classrooms of the college are located inside Malcolm Hall within the UP Diliman campus in Quezon City. The building is named after Associate Justice George Malcolm, who in 1911 became the first permanent dean of the college. The building itself, one of the oldest in the Diliman campus, was designed by the noted architect Juan M. Arellano. It was built under the supervision of the construction firm Pedro Siochi and Company. It was erected shortly before the Japanese invasion of the Philippines during World War II.

Malcolm Hall also houses the University of the Philippines Law Library, formally known as Espiritu Hall. It has the largest academic law library in the country. It contains the largest and most up-to-date collection of Philippine legal materials as well as foreign statute and case books and various law journals. The library is open to U.P. law students and professors. It is also available to non-UP law students subject to proper identification and payment of library service fees.

Several of the classrooms in Malcolm Hall are named after prominent graduates and faculty members, such as Ambrosio Padilla, Bienvenido Ambion, and Violeta Calvo-Drilon.

In 2013, a historical marker was unveiled at the façade of Malcolm Hall as part of the college's centennial celebrations. In his letter to the National Historical Commission, then dean Danilo Concepcion said that the marker was installed to “inscribe in stone” the “significance and impact of the U.P. College of Law to our country’s history as a nation.”

==== Bocobo Hall ====
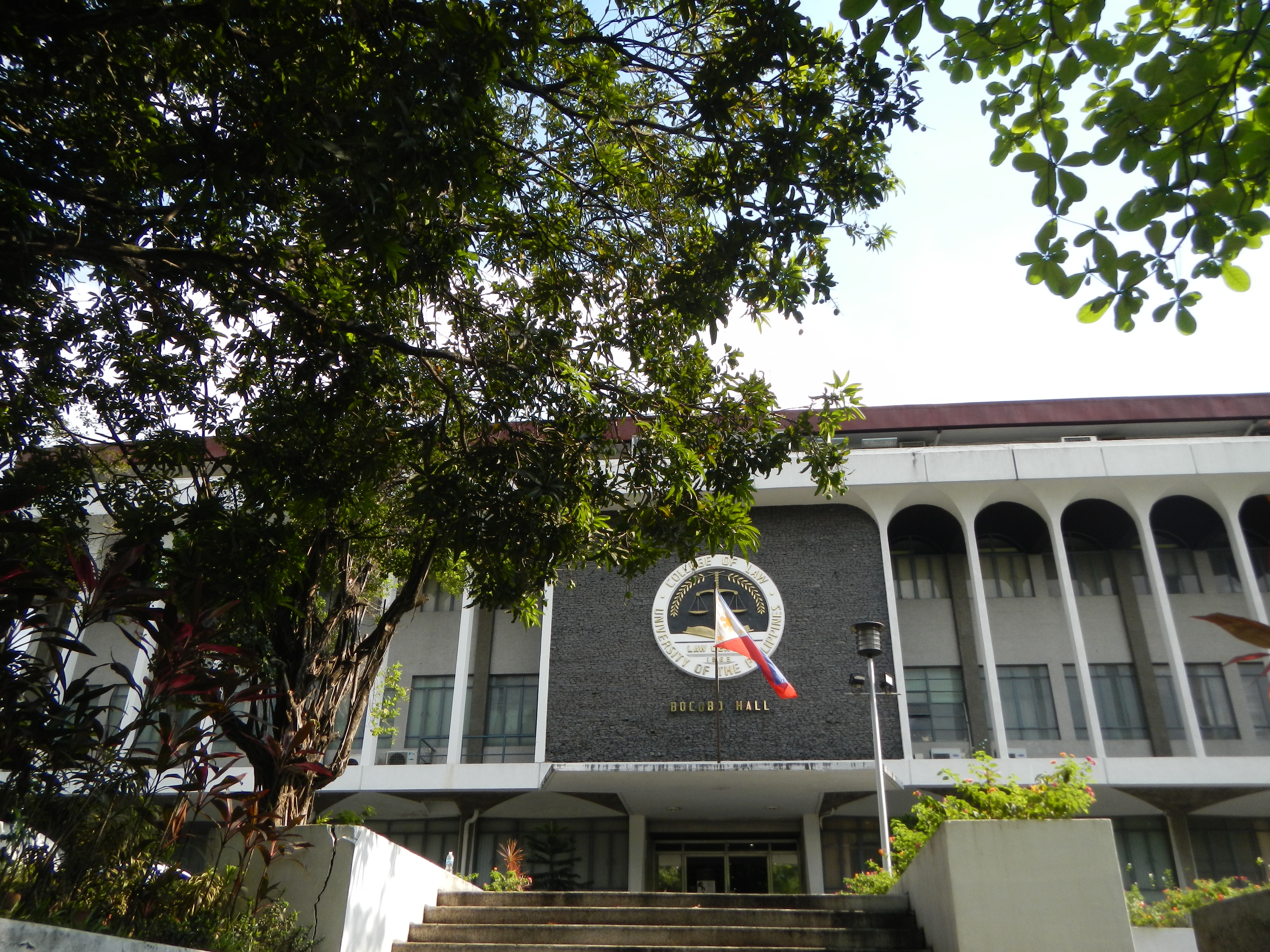
Bocobo Hall

Adjacent to Malcolm Hall is Bocobo Hall, which houses the University of the Philippines Law Center. The Law Center was established in 1964 as an agency attached to the College of Law, for the purpose of conducting continuing legal education programs, as well as legal research and publications. The Law Center is the university center for legal publishing, legal research, and law conferences. It is composed of 4 Institutes, namely, the Institute of Government and Law Reform, the Institute of Human Rights, the Institute of International Legal Studies, and the Institute of Judicial Administration.

To "popularize" the law, the Law Center conducts programs in legal literacy and street law ("practical law") in cooperation with non-governmental organizations (NGOs), student organizations, and the local barangays. Extension programs happen in the form of barangay legal education seminars to reach the grassroots level.

=== Henry Sy Sr. Hall ===
Henry Sy Sr. Hall opened in 2016 and houses the UP Bonifacio Global City campus. It serves as a satellite unit of UP Diliman. Located at the Bonifacio Global City district in Taguig, the campus hosts classes of the College of Law, and graduate courses and professional degree programs of other academic arms of UP Diliman, such as the Virata School of Business and the School of Statistics.

The nine-level structure is the 17th constituent unit of the UP System and was built at a cost of around P400 million through a donation by SM Investments (SMIC). The campus building is named after Henry Sy, founder of the SM Group of companies as well as former chairman and CEO of SMIC.

=== UP Visayas - Iloilo City ===
In September 2021, the college started offering extension classes at the Iloilo City campus of UP Visayas with a pioneer batch of 20 students.

== Prominent alumni ==
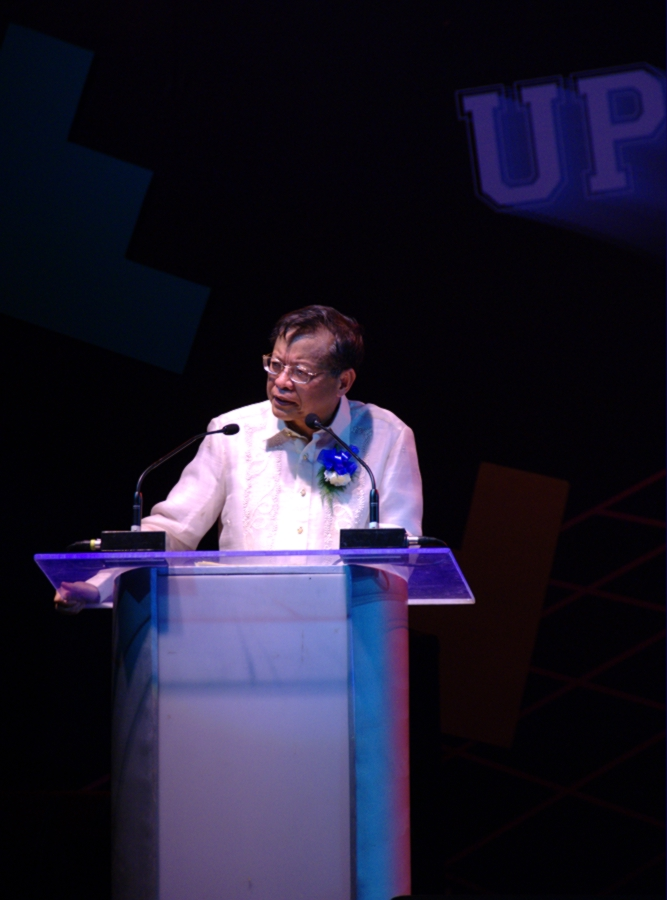
Chief Justice Reynato Puno, class of 1962

UP Law graduated many leading figures in the country's political history, including former Philippine presidents Manuel A. Roxas, José P. Laurel, Elpidio Quirino, and Ferdinand E. Marcos; incumbent Senators Franklin Drilon, Sonny Angara, Koko Pimentel, Francis Pangilinan, Richard J. Gordon, and Pia Cayetano; and prominent jurists such as former chief justices Pedro Yap, Querube Makalintal, Enrique Fernando, Teresita de Castro, Maria Lourdes Sereno, Reynato S. Puno, Hilario Davide Jr., Marcelo B. Fernan, Ramon Aquino, Felix V. Makasiar, Fred Ruiz Castro, César Bengzon, Ricardo Paras, and José Yulo.

== Organizations ==
The Philippine Law Journal, first published in 1914, is the official law review of the college. The Law Student Government is the official student government of the college, while the Bar Operations Commission is an independent constitutional body created in February 2009 that handles the holistic support system the college provides its bar candidates during the bar season.

Students who obtain a grade point average of at least 2.0 are inducted into the Order of the Purple Feather, the official honor society of the law college.

Among the student-organized organizations in the college are the Schola Juris Vespertina, composed of evening students, UP Women in Law, composed of female law students, and the Paralegal Volunteers Organization, composed of student volunteers who perform paralegal work for underprivileged and under-represented sectors of society.

Several fraternities and sororities operate within the college including Sigma Rho fraternity (which produced former Chief Justice Marcelo Fernan and Associate Justice Antonio T. Carpio) and Alpha Phi Beta fraternity (which produced former Chief Justice Reynato Puno).

== See also ==
- Legal education in the Philippines
