= Claudio Teehankee =

Chief Justice of the Philippines from 1986 to 1988

The Honorable Claudio O. Teehankee CCLH
- 鄭建祥
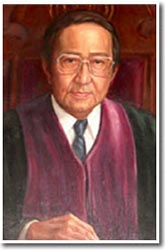

16th Chief Justice of the Supreme Court of the Philippines
- In office April 2, 1986 – April 18, 1988
- Nominated by: Corazon Aquino
- Preceded by: Ramon Aquino
- Succeeded by: Pedro L. Yap

82nd Associate Justice of the Supreme Court of the Philippines
- In office December 17, 1968 – April 1, 1986
- Nominated by: Ferdinand E. Marcos
- Preceded by: Eugenio Angeles
- Succeeded by: Andres Narvasa

35th Secretary of Justice
- In office August 5, 1967 – December 16, 1968
- President: Ferdinand E. Marcos
- Preceded by: Jose Yulo
- Succeeded by: Juan Ponce Enrile

Personal details
- Born: Claudio Ong Teehankee; April 18, 1918 Binondo, Manila, Philippine Islands
- Died: November 27, 1989 (aged 71) New York City, U.S.
- Resting place: Libingan ng mga Bayani, Taguig
- Spouse(s): Pilar Angeles Duldulao Javier-Teehankee (m. 1939)
- Children: 9, including Claudio Jr.
- Education: Ateneo de Manila University (BA, LL.B.)
- Profession: Jurist, ambassador, lawyer
- Nickname: Dingdong

Chinese name
- Traditional Chinese: 鄭建祥
- Simplified Chinese: 郑建祥
Transcriptions
Standard Mandarin
- Hanyu Pinyin: Zhèng Jiànxiáng
Southern Min
- Hokkien POJ: Tī Kiàn-siông

Claudio Ong Teehankee, CCLH (simplified Chinese: 郑建祥; traditional Chinese: 鄭建祥; Pe̍h-ōe-jī: Tī Kiàn-siông; April 18, 1918 – November 27, 1989) was the 16th Chief Justice of the Supreme Court of the Philippines from 1986 to 1988.

He was also the most senior associate justice and chairman of the First Division of the Supreme Court of the Philippines.

== Early life and education ==
Teehankee was born on April 18, 1918, in Manila, Philippines, as the seventh child of Dr. José Teehankee and Julia Ong y Sangroniz.

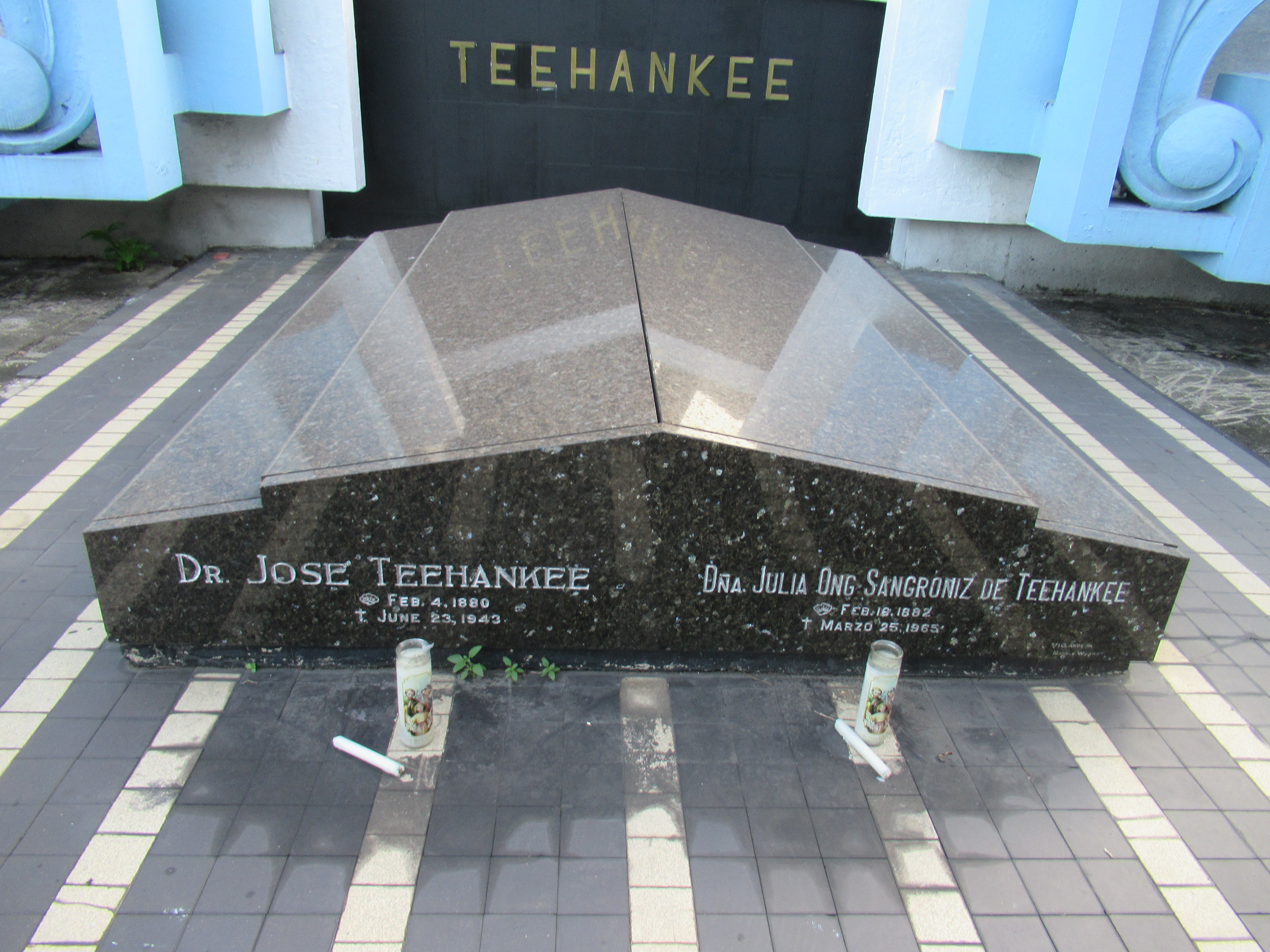
The graves of José Teehankee and Julia Ong Sangroniz, Claudio Teehankee's parents, at the Manila Chinese Cemetery.

His father, José Tee Han Kee (simplified Chinese: 郑汉淇; traditional Chinese: 鄭漢淇; pinyin: Zhèng Hànqí; Pe̍h-ōe-jī: Tīⁿ Hàn-kî), immigrated to the Philippines in 1901 from Fujian province in China. He was a close associate and friend of Sun Yat-Sen, and was active in the struggle to liberate China from the Qing dynasty. Dr. Tee Han Kee later became the founding director of Chinese General Hospital. Claudio learned to write in fluent Chinese, and contributed multiple articles later on for the Chinese-language newspaper The Fookien Times Yearbook from 1966 to 1968.

He received his A.B. summa cum laude in 1938 and LL.B. with the only summa cum laude in the school as part of the second batch in 1940 at the Ateneo de Manila. He also garnered first place in the 1940 bar examination with an average of 94.35 percent.

== Career ==
Teehankee was Marcos's lawyer in the libel case regarding the movie, Iginuhit ng Tadhana, then became Secretary of Justice under the Marcos administration in 1967 before being appointed as associate justice in 1968.

He was known as the court's "activist" justice because of his dissenting opinions in many vital cases affecting the Marcos administration. He was the lone dissenter in many cases, such as the High Tribunal's decision upholding the constitutionality of the Judiciary Reorganization Act of 1980. He also dissented in policies which would seem to curtail the basic liberties of people. For a time, Teehankee and Justice Cecilia Muñoz-Palma would dissent together. After Muñoz-Palma's retirement, he was joined by Associate Justice Vicente Abad Santos in dissenting.

It was this activism that made Marcos 'by-pass' him twice for the position of Chief Justice (the most senior associate justice is most likely to succeed after the retirement of the Chief Justice) in 1985. It was after the removal of Marcos that he was appointed Chief Justice by Corazon Aquino in 1987.

== Later years ==
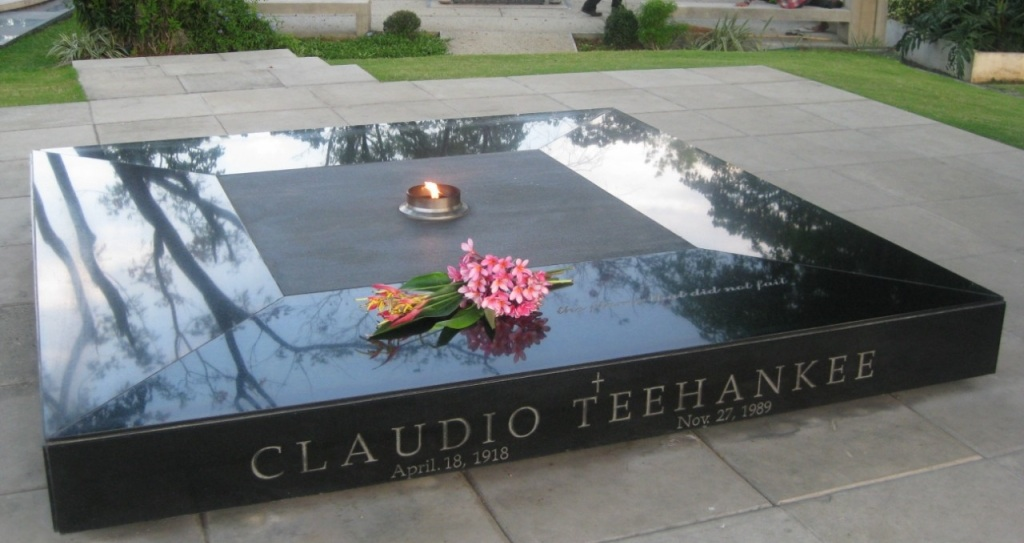
Teehankee's grave at the Libingan ng mga Bayani.

After his retirement, he was appointed as the Philippine Ambassador to the United Nations, where he died of cancer in Manhattan, New York on November 27, 1989, at the age of 71. He is interred at the Libingan ng mga Bayani.

== Personal life ==
Teehankee was married to Pilar Duldulao Javier with whom he had nine children. Like Teehankee, his eighth son Manuel Antonio topped the bar in 1983 and also became a diplomat.

His son Claudio Jr. would be imprisoned for homicide in the 1990s.

== See also ==
- Chief Justice of the Supreme Court of the Philippines
- Associate Justice of the Supreme Court of the Philippines
- Supreme Court of the Philippines
- Constitution of the Philippines

== Sources ==
- Supreme Court of the Philippines – Claudio Teehankee biodata

Political offices
Preceded by Jose Yulo	Secretary of Justice; 1967–1968	Succeeded by Juan Ponce Enrile
Legal offices
Preceded by Ramon Aquino	Chief Justice of the Supreme Court of the Philippines; 1986–1988	Succeeded by Pedro Yap
Preceded by Eugenio Angeles	Associate Justice of the Supreme Court of the Philippines; 1969–1986	Succeeded by Andres Narvasa
