= Florangel Rosario-Braid =

Educator

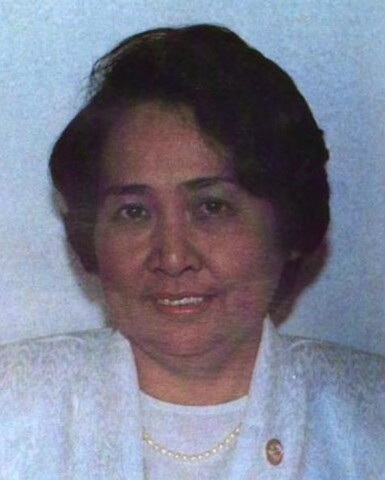
- Rosario-Braid from the Official Directory of the Constitutional Commission, c. 1986

Member of the Philippine Constitutional Commission
- In office June 2, 1986 – October 15, 1986
- President: Corazon Aquino

Executive Dean of the Asian Institute of Journalism and Communication
- In office 1980–2001

Personal details
- Born: 1932 (age 93–94) Pangasinan
- Spouse: Andrew F. Braid
- Children: 4
- Education: University of the Philippines Diliman (BA); Syracuse University (MS, PhD)
- Occupation: Professor; consultant; writer
- Known for: Framer of the 1987 Constitution

Florangel Rosario-Braid (born 1932) is a Filipina writer, educator, and constitutionalist, who was a member of the Philippine Constitutional Commission of 1986. She served as president and executive dean, currently president emeritus of the Asian Institute of Journalism and Communication (AIJC).

== Education ==
She completed her bachelor's degree from the University of the Philippines Diliman and her M.S. and Ph.D. degrees from Syracuse University, New York, in mass communication.

== Career ==
Rosario-Braid is a trustee, senior adviser, and former president of the Asian Institute of Journalism and Communication. She also became an executive dean from 1980 to 2001. She authored works on communication, education, cooperatives, science and technology, NGOs, and human rights. She became a chair of Philippine Social Science Council. She is also a regular columnist at the Manila Bulletin and also a former president and member of founding directors at the Philippine Daily Inquirer.

== Framer of 1987 Constitution ==
She was one of the selected framers of the Philippine Constitutional Commission of 1986 by former President Corazon Aquino.

Together with Christian Monsod, Adolfo Azcuna, Hilario Davide Jr., Ed Garcia, Jose Luis Gascon, Ricardo Romulo, Jaime S.L. Tadeo, and Bernardo Villegas, Rosario-Braid was one of the remaining-surviving framers who denounced the burial of Ferdinand Marcos burial at the Libingan ng mga Bayani. She supported the Bangsamoro Law and also condemned the Anti-Terror Bill signed by Rodrigo Duterte.

== Personal life ==
She was married to Dr. Andrew F. Braid, an international development executive. They have four children, 10 grandchildren, and five great-grandchildren.

She also has an exhibit of her paintings.

== See also ==
- Philippine Star
- Philippine Constitutional Commission of 1986
- CAP College Foundation
- TOFIL Award

== Works ==
Books

- Communication Strategies for Productivity Improvement

Edited works

- Crimes and Unpunishment: The Killing of Filipino Journalists
