= TOFIL Award =

Philippine award

- Awarded for: The Outstanding Filipino
- Country: Philippines
- Presented by: JCI Senate Philippines
- First award: 1988
- Website: www.jcisenatephilippines.org/tofil.html

The Outstanding Filipino or TOFIL Award is the honor given by the Junior Chamber International (JCI) Philippines to Filipino men and women, 41 years of age and over, whose exemplary achievements are worthy of emulation. The award was conceived in 1988 to institutionalize the public recognition of these outstanding individuals.

== History ==
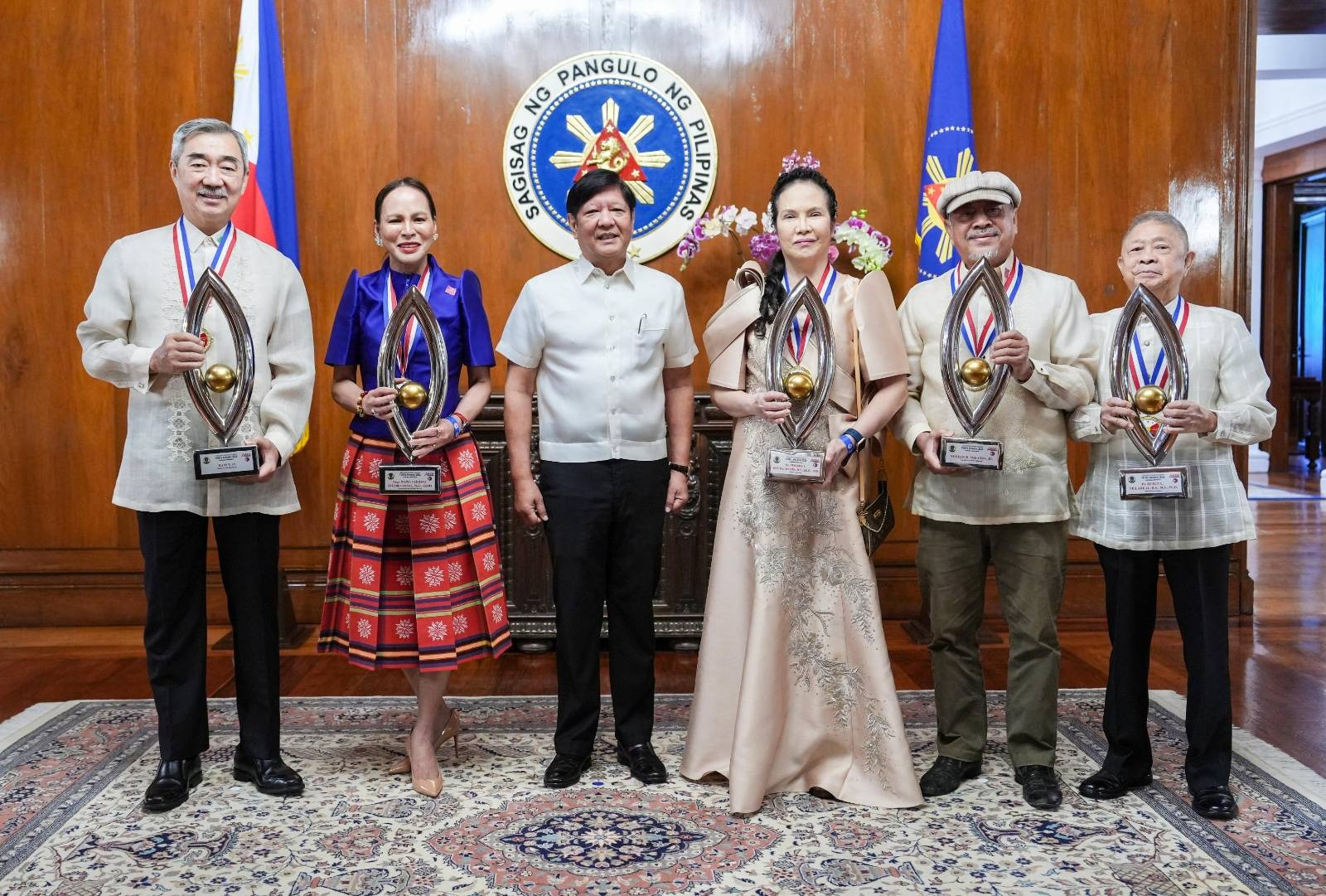
The 2022 TOFIL Awards recipients with President Bongbong Marcos (center).

JCI Senate Philippines believes that there are a lot of men and women age 41 and over who deserve recognition for their contributions to society. It enlisted the support of Insular Life in an endeavor that would give due recognition to these people. Thus the TOFIL Award was born.

The JCI Senate Philippines is an organization of a select group of Junior Chamber International (JCI) members, who, in recognition of their outstanding achievements and contributions to the JCI movement, have been awarded lifetime membership as JCI Senators. They now number 3,000 in the Philippines. Among them are: a former chief justice, senators, representatives, cabinet secretaries, governors, city mayors, judges, and other government officials; presidents of financial, industrial, commercial, agricultural, and other business enterprises; distinguished doctors, lawyers and other professionals; successful entrepreneurs and community leaders.

== Criteria ==
Nomination for the award is open to every Filipino, natural born, naturalized citizen or bearing dual citizenship (Filipino and a foreign country), at least 41 years of age and of good moral character whose dedication to his/her profession or vocation has made significant contributions to the advancement of his/her calling, public welfare and national development. Honorees are chosen based on the strength of their character and integrity; and the impact of their achievements on their field of work, public welfare and national development.

== TOFIL Awardees ==
The following is the list of TOFIL awardees from its conception in 1988 to the present:

=== 1988 ===
- Edgardo Espiritu, Banking
- Cecilia Muñoz-Palma, Public Service
- Emmanuel Pelaez, Government Service
- Jose B. L. Reyes, Human Rights
- Cardinal Jaime Sin, Spiritual Leadership
- Lorenzo Tañada, Freedom Advocacy

=== 1989 ===
- Marcelo B. Fernan, Judiciary
- Jose B. Fernandez, Banking
- Lucrecia Kasilag, Arts & Culture
- Rosa Rosal, Humanitarian Service

=== 1990 ===
- Diosdado Macapagal, Government Service
- Ameurfina Melencio-Herrera, Judiciary
- Teodoro Locsín Sr., Journalism
- Zeneida Amador, Theater

=== 1991 ===
- Arturo D. Gorrez, Manufacturing
- Manuel P. Manahan, Rural Development
- Leonardo S. Sarao, Entrepreneurship
- Dioscoro L. Umali, Agricultural Research

=== 1992 ===
- Henry R. Canoy, Media
- Renato Constantino, History
- Edgardo D. Gomez, Science
- Jose T. Joya, Visual Arts

=== 1993 ===
- Jovito Salonga, Public Service
- Jose L. Guevara, Journalism
- Francisco Demetrio, SJ, Culture
- Antonio Manikan, Humanitarian Service
- Jorge Garcia, Medicine & Surgery
- Bonifacio Isidro, Science & Technology

=== 1994 ===
- Romeo Contemplacion, Rural Medicine
- Armando Malay, Journalism/Human Rights
- Nicanor Perlas, Agriculture
- Dionisio Salazar, Drama/Literature
- Benjamin Tayabas, Education

=== 1995 ===
- Jose T. Amacio, Cooperative Development
- Alfredo S. Buenaventura, Music
- Gonzalo O. Catan, Jr., Science & Technology
- Crispin C. Maslog, Literature/Journalism
- Christian Monsod, Government Service

=== 1996 ===
- Irene R. Cortes, Justice and Law (Posthumous Award)
- Salvador H. Laurel, Public Service
- Richard J. Gordon, Government Service
- Onofre R. Pagsanghan, Culture and Arts
- Helena Zoila T. Benitez, Education

=== 1997 ===
- Raul J. Bonoan, S.J., Education
- Fe del Mundo, Medicine
- Menardo R. Jimenez, Business/Entrepreneurship
- Alfredo S. Lim, Public Service
- Estefania Aldaba-Lim, Humanitarian Service
- Andrea Veneracion, Culture and Arts

=== 1998 ===
- Ramon V. del Rosario Sr., Business
- Cardinal Ricardo J. Vidal, Religious Work
- Carlos R. Alindada, Public Accounting
- Perla D. Santos Ocampo, M.D., Medicine
- Bayani F. Fernando, Government Service

=== 1999 ===
- Mateo Armando T. Caparas, Community Service
- Hilario G. Davide, Jr., Law
- Remedios L. Macalincag, Banking & Finance
- Amador C. Muriel, Science & Technology
- Efren M. Reyes, Sports
- Wigberto E. Tañada, Government & Public Service
- Pierre T. Tritz, S. J., Education

=== 2000 ===
- Corazon C. Santos-de la Paz, Public Accounting
- Antolin M. Oreta, Sr., Engineering Practice
- Lawrence C. Qua, Technopreneurship
- Flerida Ruth P. Romero, Justice/Law
- Alfonso T. Yuchengco, Business & Entrepreneurship

=== 2001 ===
- James G. Dy, Humanitarian Service
- Ceferino L. Follosco, Science, Technology, & Engineering
- Fortunata C. Villamar, Education
- Jose C. Vitug, Law/Judiciary
- Enrique J. Zobel, Business

=== 2002 ===
- Feliciano Belmonte, Jr., Government Service
- David Consunji, Construction Industry
- Emil Q. Javier, Science & Technology
- George S.K. Ty, Banking

=== 2003 ===
- Robert Kuan, Business & Entrepreneurship
- Eva Maamo, SPC, Community Service
- Felicito Payumo, Government Service

=== 2004 ===
- Juan C. Acosta, Ph. D., Agriculture
- Gelia T. Castillo, Ph. D., Science and Technology
- Francisco Mañosa, Architecture
- Nelia Cortes-Maramba, M.D., Medicine
- Ruben M. Tanseco, S.J., Humanitarian Service

=== 2005 ===
- Ben Farrales, Fashion, Arts and Culture
- Lauro L. Baja, Jr., Bilateral and Multi-lateral Diplomacy
- Adolfo B. Bellosillo, M.D., Medicine

=== 2006 ===
- Marciano Evangelista, S.D.B., Service Non-Government Organization
- Antonio P. Meloto, Humanitarian Service
- Ramon Orlina, Arts
- Socorro Ramos, Business

=== 2007 ===
- Florangel R. Braid, Ph.D., for Literature and Journalism
- Jose S. Concepcion, Jr., for Social Advocacy
- Felipe F. Cruz, General Construction
- Hernani G. Golez, Ph.D., Agriculture.

=== 2008 ===
- Antonio S. Abacan, Jr., Banking
- Rustica Carpio, Ph. D., Culture and Arts
- Mary Placid Lorna C. Abejo, O.S.B., Music
- Rafael D. Guerrero III, Ph. D., Science & Technology
- Federico M. Macaranas, Ph. D., Economics

=== 2009 ===
- Teotimo Aganon, Ph. D. for Science and Technology;
- Senen C. Bacani, Agriculture
- Arturo Cunanan, Jr., M.D., Ph. D., Public Health;
- Lydia B. Echauz, D.B.A. Education
- Oscar M. Lopez, Business

=== 2010 ===
- Ray L. Catague, M.D., Public Health
- Esperanza I. Cabral, M.D., Government Service
- Isagani R. Cruz, Literature
- Shirley Halili-Cruz, Arts and Culture
- Tony Leachon, M.D., Medicine
- Joel E. Tabora, S.J., Education

=== 2011 ===
- Jesus P. Estanislao, Ph.D., Governance
- Jose T. Pardo, Business
- Emerlinda R. Roman, Education
- Sylvia D. Pendon, Entrepreneurship
- Ramon M. Nery, M.D., Government/Public Service

=== 2012 ===
- Jose F. Datuin for the Arts;
- Samuel Pagdilao for Military/Police work
- Adolfo S. Azcuna, Justice/Law

=== 2013 ===
- Alfredo Lagmay, Geology and Earth Science;
- Rogelio Singson, Governance and Public Service
- Arsenio B. Ella, Environmental Conservation and Sustainable Development

=== 2014 ===
- Gemma Cruz-Araneta, Culture & Arts;
- Francis J. Kong, Business Entrepreneurship
- Joey Salceda, Government Service

=== 2016 ===
- Anton Pascual, Culture & Arts;
- Jose Cuisia Jr., Business Entrepreneurship
- William Dar, Government Service

=== 2019 ===
- Ramon S. Ang, Business and Entrepreneurship
- Glenn Banaguas, Environment Conservation and Science Diplomacy
- Joselito R. Chavez, Medicine
- Virgilio Malang, Science and Technology
- Noel Rosal, Government/Public Service
- Nelly Siababa-Aggangan, Agriculture

=== 2022 ===
- Persida Acosta, Justice and Law
- Maria Catalina Cabral, Government and Public Service
- Nemesio Miranda, Visual Arts and Sculpture
- Hans T. Sy, Business and Reliance
- Ruben Villareal, Agriculture Science
