= Ambrosio Padilla =

Filipino lawyer, basketball player and politician

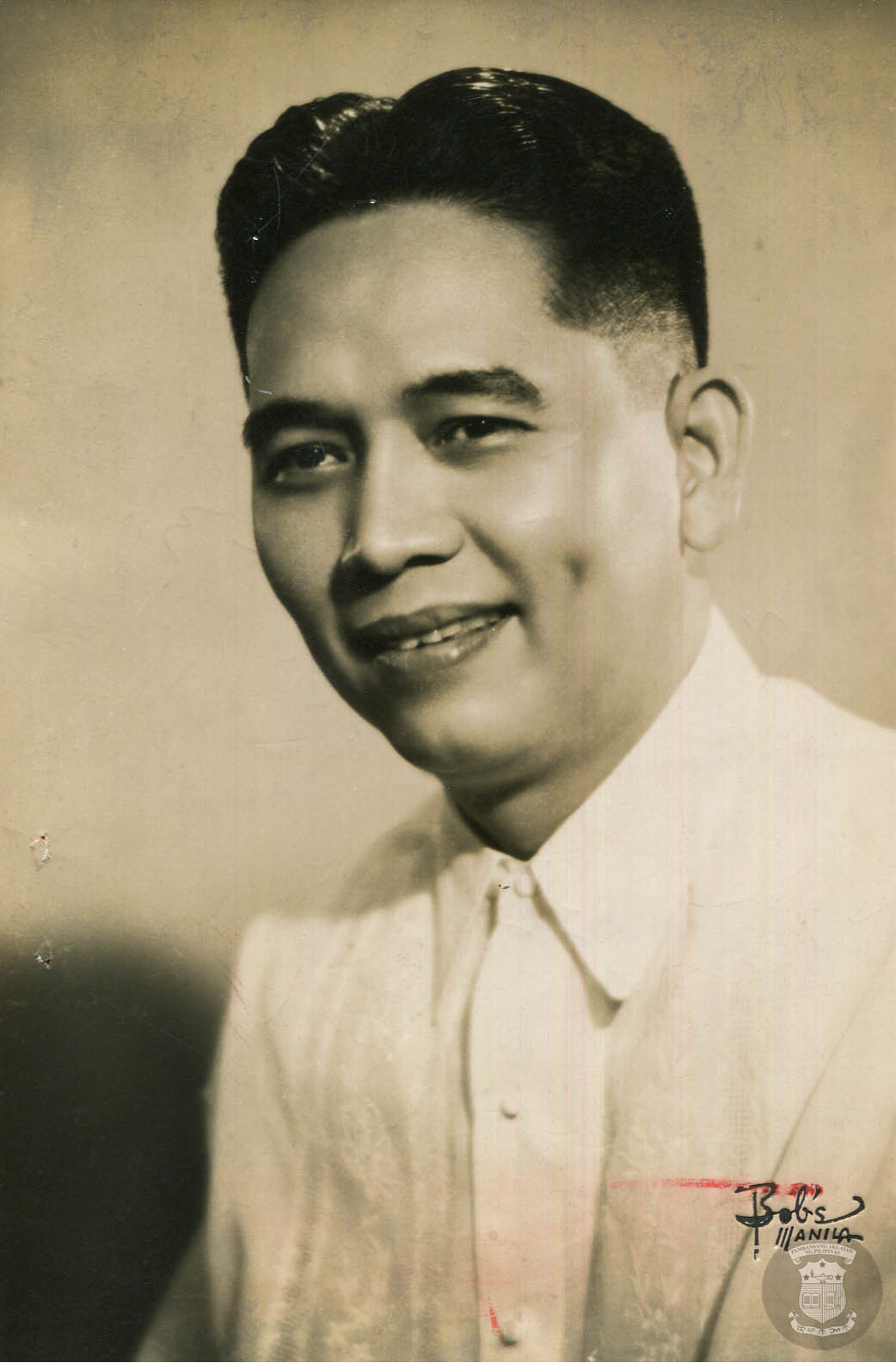

Senate Minority Leader
- In office January 17, 1966 – December 30, 1969
- Preceded by: Estanislao Fernandez
- Succeeded by: Gerry Roxas
- In office January 27, 1958 – January 25, 1960
- Preceded by: Lorenzo M. Tañada Sr.
- Succeeded by: Ferdinand Marcos

Senator of the Philippines
- In office December 30, 1957 – September 23, 1972

Solicitor General of the Philippines
- In office September 1, 1954 – December 30, 1957
- President: Ramon Magsaysay
- Preceded by: Querube Makalintal
- Succeeded by: Guillermo Torres

1st President of the Philippine Olympic Committee
- In office 1975–1976
- Preceded by: Himself (as President of the Philippine Amateur Athletic Federation)
- Succeeded by: Nereo Andolong

6th President of the Philippine Amateur Athletic Federation
- In office 1970–1975
- Preceded by: Felipe Monserrat
- Succeeded by: Himself (as President of the Philippine Olympic Committee)

Vice President of the 1986 Constitutional Commission
- In office June 2, 1986 – October 15, 1986
- President: Cecilia Muñoz-Palma

Personal details
- Born: Ambrosio Bibby Padilla; December 7, 1910 Lingayen, Pangasinan, Philippine Islands
- Died: August 11, 1996 (aged 85) Quezon City, Philippines
- Party: Nacionalista (1980–1996)
- Other political affiliations: Liberal (1957–1960; 1962–1980)
- Spouse: Lourdes de las Alas (m. 1941; died 1994)
- Children: 10
- Education: Ateneo de Manila; University of the Philippines Diliman (LL.B)
- Basketball career

Career information
- College: Ateneo; UP
Medals
Men's basketball
Representing Philippines
Far Eastern Championship Games
Gold medal – first place	1930 Tokyo	Team

Ambrosio "Paddy" Bibby Padilla (Tagalog: [paˈdilja]; December 7, 1910 – August 11, 1996) was a Filipino basketball player, lawyer, and an elected member of the Senate of the Philippines. He was one of the most important figures in Asian basketball development.

== Early life ==
Padilla was born as the eighth of eleven children of Dr. Nicanor Padilla and Ysabel Bibby. He married Lourdes de las Alas on May 4, 1941, the eldest daughter of Taaleño senator Antonio de las Alas. Padilla fathered ten children: six boys and four girls.

== Athletic career ==
Padilla was born in Lingayen, Pangasinan. He studied at the Ateneo de Manila for his high school and college education. In college, he was the team captain of the 1928 Ateneo de Manila Blue Eagles varsity basketball squad that won the 1928 NCAA (Philippines) basketball championship under coach James A. Martin, S.J. Later, he studied law at the University of the Philippines and became a varsity player of the university's baseball team in the early 1930s.

In 1930, Padilla played for the Philippines which won the gold medal of the 9th Far Eastern Games basketball tournament in Tokyo, Japan. He played alongside Jacinto Ciria Cruz and Mariano Filomeno. In 1934, he captained the national team that retained the basketball championship in the 10th Far Eastern Games held at home for the final time.

In 1936, Padilla as team captain of the national basketball team led the Philippines to a fifth-place finish in the 1936 Summer Olympics held in Berlin, Germany. It remains the best finish by an Asian country in men's Olympic basketball history. The team was coached by Dionisio Calvo and, aside from Padilla, boasted of great players like Ciria Cruz and Charles Borck.

Padilla retired from basketball and became the chair of the Philippine Amateur Athletic Federation (PAAF) Basketball Committee from 1938 to 1954.

The international governing body, FIBA, appointed Padilla as its vice president for Asia from 1956 to 1964. He was one of the forefathers and later elected President of the Asian Basketball Confederation (ABC), now known as FIBA Asia, from 1960 to 1966 with his former coach Dionisio Calvo as the Secretary-General. When he finished his term, he served as the ABC president emeritus from 1967.

He became the sixth President of the Philippine Amateur Athletic Federation (PAAF), the forerunner of the Philippine Olympic Committee (POC), in 1970 and became the first president of the POC when PAAF was renamed POC in 1975.

== Political career ==
President Ramon Magsaysay appointed Padilla as Solicitor General in 1954. He later resigned in 1957 to run for the Senate as a Liberal candidate and won. Padilla had become a Liberal Party (LP) member at the request of former senator José Yulo, who was the LP's official nominee for president in 1957.

Padilla served as Senate Minority Floor Leader from January 1958 until January 1960; Padilla's tenure as minority leader ended as a result of a feud between him and fellow Liberal Senator Ferdinand Marcos, the latter of whom had been designated as the Liberal Party's new choice for the position. Soon after, Padilla was expelled from the LP by its executive committee for refusing to allow Marcos to become Senate minority leader and for participating in the formation of a third party coalition (the Grand Alliance) during the 1959 midterm election. Padilla soon countered that his expulsion was due to his refusal in April 1958 to endorse Vice President Diosdado Macapagal for president in the upcoming 1961 election. After Macapagal's election in late 1961, the LP executive committee's resolution expelling Padilla was revoked, and Padilla would vote for Marcos as Senate President in 1962.

Padilla served in the Senate until 1972 when Marcos, by then president of the Philippines, declared martial law. Notwithstanding his stature and brushing aside the dangers arising from his opposition to the martial law regime, he actively fought the Marcos regime with his legal skills and belief in freedom.

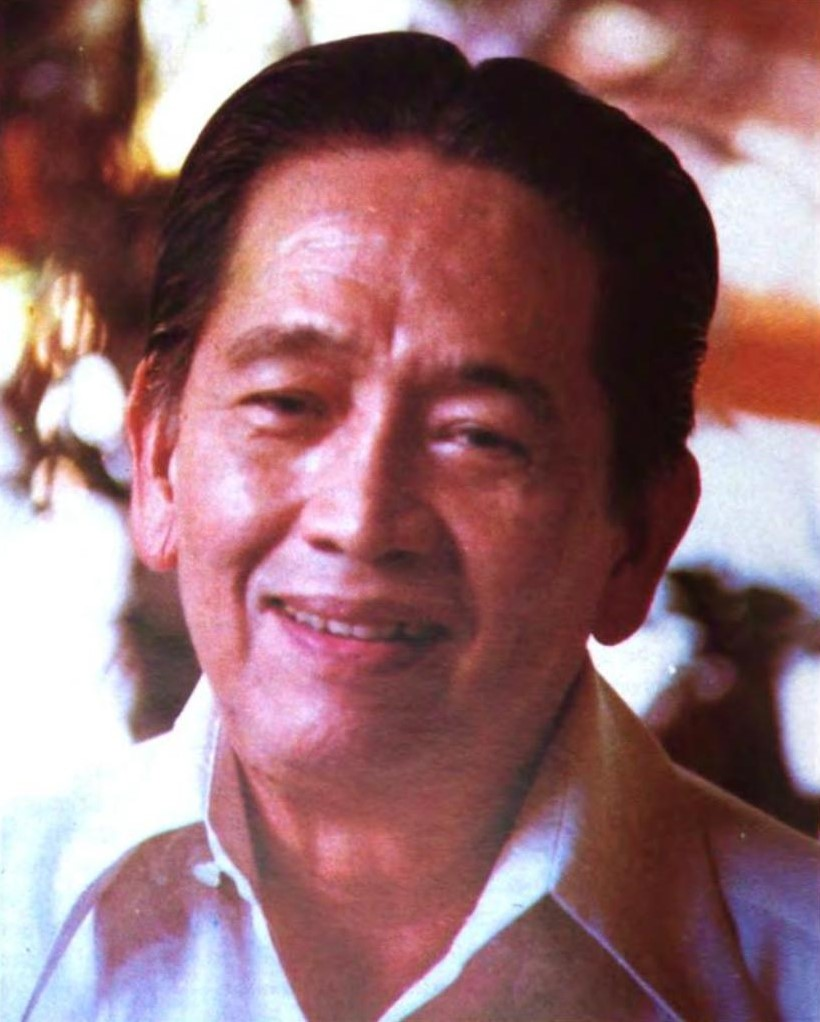
Padilla from the Official Directory of the Constitutional Commission, c. 1986

In 1985, Padilla became president of the Bagong Alyansang Makabayan (Bayan), a political alliance of opposition groups from across the political spectrum; he had succeeded former senator Jose W. Diokno, who resigned as president due to being reportedly uneasy about the growing influence of the Communist Party of the Philippines (CPP) on the alliance. Soon, however, Padilla would also resign from his position by January 1986 due to Bayan's boycott of the 1986 snap presidential election, in which Padilla supported the candidacy of Corazon Aquino.

After Marcos was overthrown in the 1986 People Power Revolution, President Corazon Aquino appointed Padilla to the 1986 Constitutional Commission which was tasked to draft a new constitution for the country. Padilla was elected vice-chair of the commission with former Supreme Court Associate Justice Cecilia Muñoz-Palma as its chair. During debates on the draft, Padilla opposed the abolition of capital punishment from the new constitution, but came to a compromise due to arguments against the death penalty by human rights commissioners. The new constitution was officially ratified by the Filipino people in a plebiscite held on February 2, 1987.

== Legacy ==
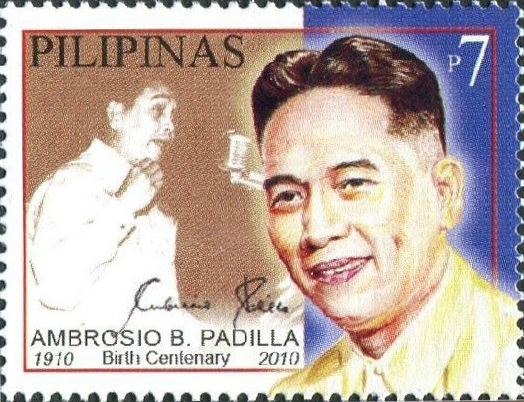
Senator Padilla on a 2010 stamp of the Philippines

Padilla, who died on August 11, 1996, was inducted into the Philippine National Basketball Hall of Fame in January 1999 along with other Filipino basketball greats like Carlos Loyzaga, Lauro Mumar, Jacinto Ciria Cruz, Charles Borck, Edgardo Ocampo, Mariano Tolentino, and his own Olympic coach Chito Calvo. The Ateneo de Manila University's Ambrosio Padilla Award, which is given out annually to the university's best academically performing college varsity player from any sport, is named in his honor.

A classroom at Malcolm Hall of the University of the Philippines College of Law is named in his honor.

== Personal life ==
He is the father of Francisco "Frank" Padilla, founder and Servant General of the Catholic renewal group Missionary Families of Christ. Another of Padilla's children is Alexander Padilla, also a graduate of the UP College of Law in 1981, and the CEO and President of Philippine Health Insurance Corporation from 2013 to 2016, who also became Undersecretary of the Department of Health. Padilla was a junior faculty member when he helped found the UP Alpha Phi Beta fraternity in 1939, together with mentored students such as Renato Constantino.

== Electoral history ==
Electoral history of Ambrosio Padilla
Year	Office	Party	Votes received				Result
Year	Office	Party	Total	%	P.	Swing	Result
1957	Senator of the Philippines	Liberal	1,636,202	32.03%	6th	—N/a	Won
1963	Senator of the Philippines	Liberal	3,384,064	43.88%	4th	—N/a	Won
1969	Senator of the Philippines	Liberal	3,999,662	48.76%	5th	—N/a	Won

== Awards and achievements ==
- 1928 NCAA Philippines champions
- 1930 Far Eastern Games champion
- 1934 Far Eastern Games champions
- 1936 Summer Olympics, fifth place
- Philippine National Hall of Fame (1999)

== See also ==
- Philippine Constitutional Commission of 1986
