= Philippine Liberation Medal =

Military award of the Philippines

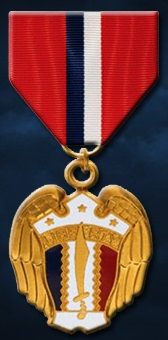
- Philippine Liberation Medal
- Type: Medal (Decoration)
- Presented by: Republic of the Philippines
- Eligibility: participation in the liberation of the Philippine Islands from October 17, 1944, to September 3, 1945
- Status: Current
- Established: December 20, 1944 (Ribbon); July 22, 1945 (Medal)
- First award: 1948 (United States)
- Service ribbon Streamer

The Philippine Liberation Medal is a military award of the Republic of the Philippines which was created by an order of Commonwealth Army of the Philippines Headquarters on December 20, 1944, and was issued as the Philippine Liberation Ribbon. The decoration was presented to any service member, of both Philippine Commonwealth and allied militaries, who participated in the liberation of the Philippine Islands between October 17, 1944, and September 2, 1945. A full-sized medal was authorized and added on July 22, 1945.

The Philippine Liberation Medal is intended to recognize military service during the last eleven months of World War II when the military of Japan was driven from the Philippines before their surrender in September 1945.

== Criteria ==
To be awarded the Philippine Liberation Medal, a service member must have met at least one of the following criteria:

- Participation in the initial landing operation of Leyte and adjoining islands from October 17 to 20, 1944. An individual is considered to have participated in such operations if he landed on Leyte or adjoining islands, was on a ship in Philippine waters, or was a crewmember of an airplane, which flew over Philippine territory during the period.
- Participation in any engagement against hostile Japanese forces on Leyte and adjoining islands during the Philippine Liberation Campaign of October 17, 1944, to September 2, 1945.
- Participation in any engagement against hostile Japanese forces on islands other than those mentioned above during the Philippine Liberation Campaign of October 17, 1944, to September 2, 1945.
- Served in the Philippine Islands or on ships in Philippine waters for not less than 30 days during the period.

Personnel who are awarded the medal for participation in any of the above-mentioned operations are authorized a bronze 3/16" service star to the Philippine Liberation Medal for each additional qualifying action.

Members of the United States Armed Forces included the Philippine Commonwealth Army and Philippine Constabulary. Those members were also eligible to receive the Asiatic-Pacific Campaign Medal, often with a service star, for participation in the liberation of the Philippines.

== Other information ==
The Philippine Liberation Medal was awarded to allied militaries, primarily the forces of the Philippine Commonwealth, United States Armed Forces, and the military of the British Commonwealth.

The U.S. Army authorized the medal on March 8, 1948.

In the United Kingdom in 2003, three former servicemen (Glyndwr Thomas Evan Collins, who fought in the World War II liberation of the Philippines, Constantine Shiels, and Frank Broomhead) were awarded the medal by the Philippine ambassador Edgardo B. Espiritu, under General Orders Number 1090.

Other similar Philippine military awards of World War II include the Philippine Independence Medal and the Philippine Defense Medal.

== See also ==
- Awards and decorations of the Armed Forces of the Philippines
- Philippine Defense Medal
- Philippine Independence Medal
- French Liberation Medal
