= Philippine Constitutional Commission of 1986 =

Body that drafted the Philippine constitution

- Constituent assembly
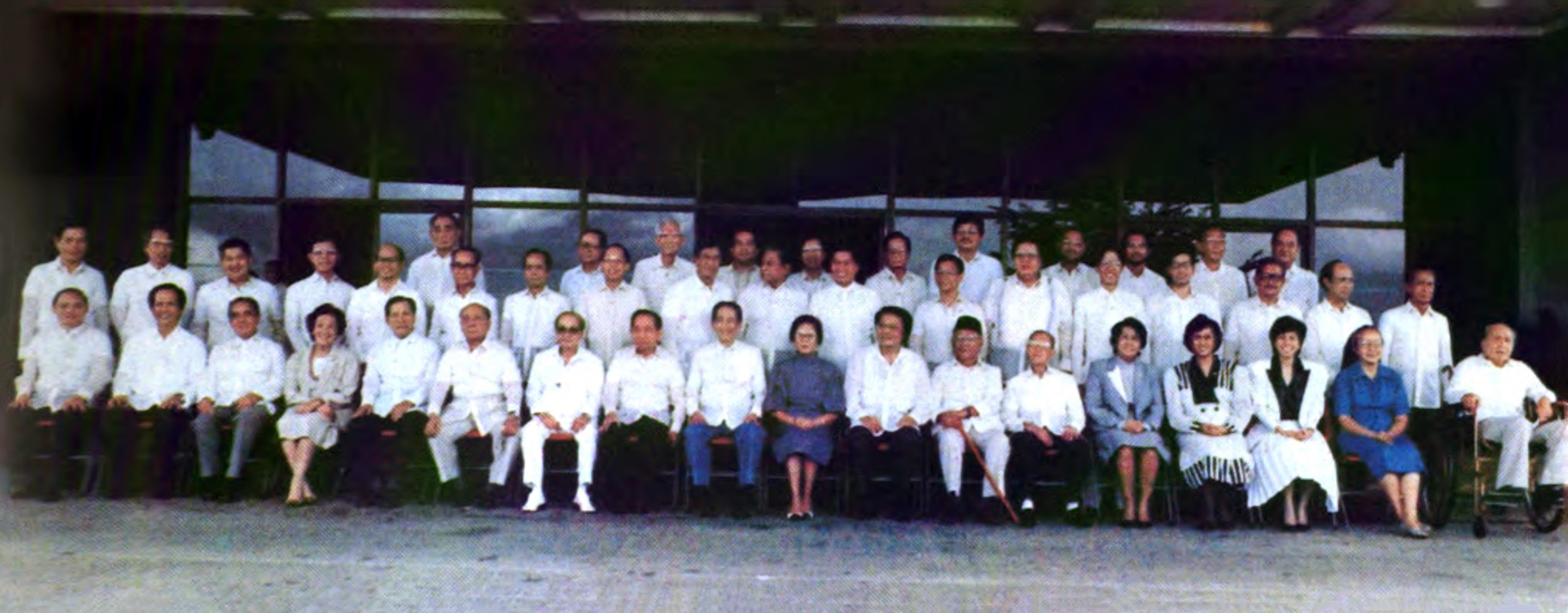
- Commissioners of the Philippine Constitutional Commission of 1986

Type
- Type: Unicameral

History
- Founded: June 2, 1986
- Disbanded: October 15, 1986 (adjourned)
- Preceded by: Philippine Constitutional Convention of 1971

Leadership
- President: Cecilia Muñoz-Palma
- Vice President: Ambrosio Padilla
- Floor Leader: Napoleon Rama
- Assistant Floor Leaders: Jose D. Calderon; Domocao Alonto
- Seats: 50

Meeting place
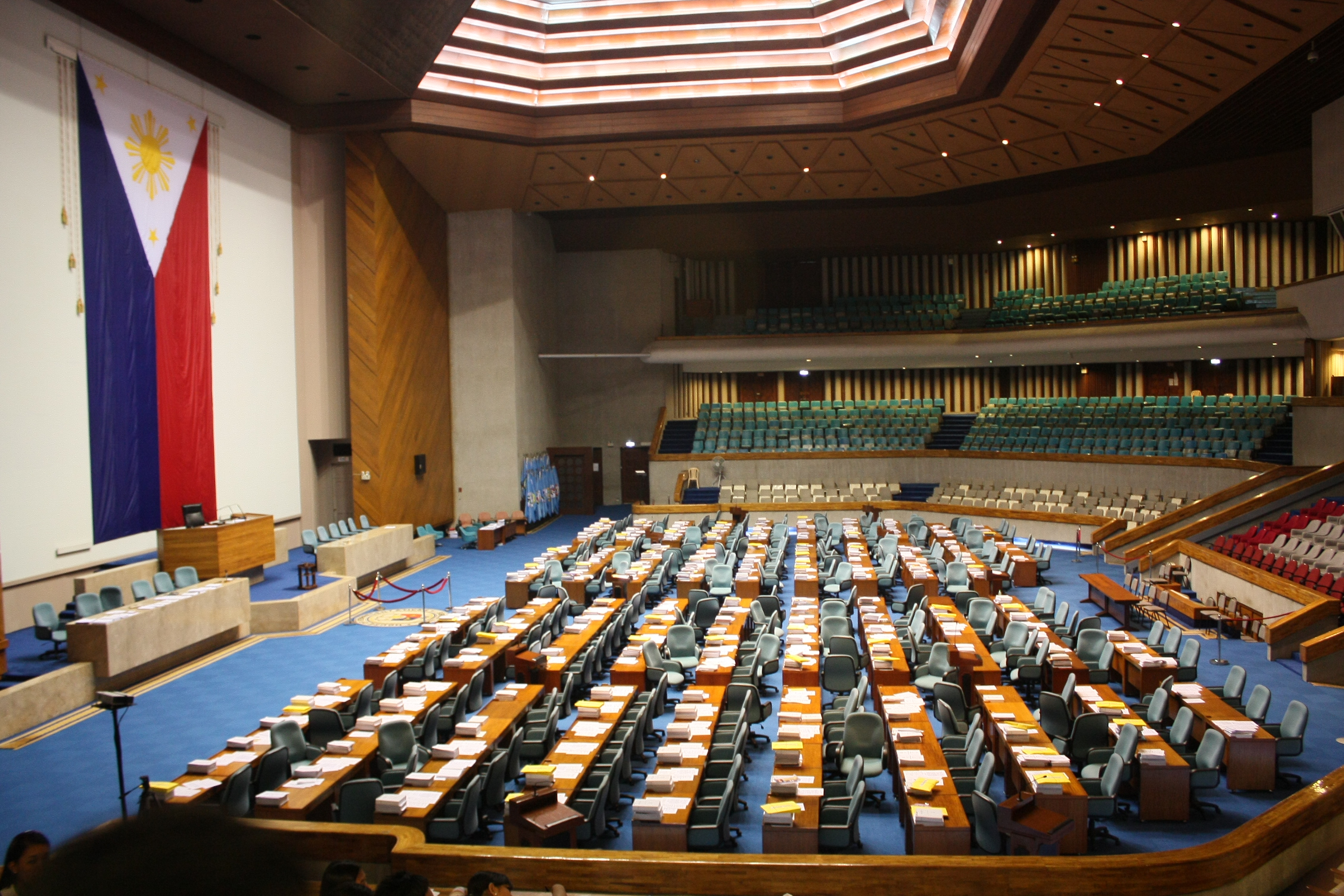
- Session Hall of the Batasang Pambansa Complex, Quezon City

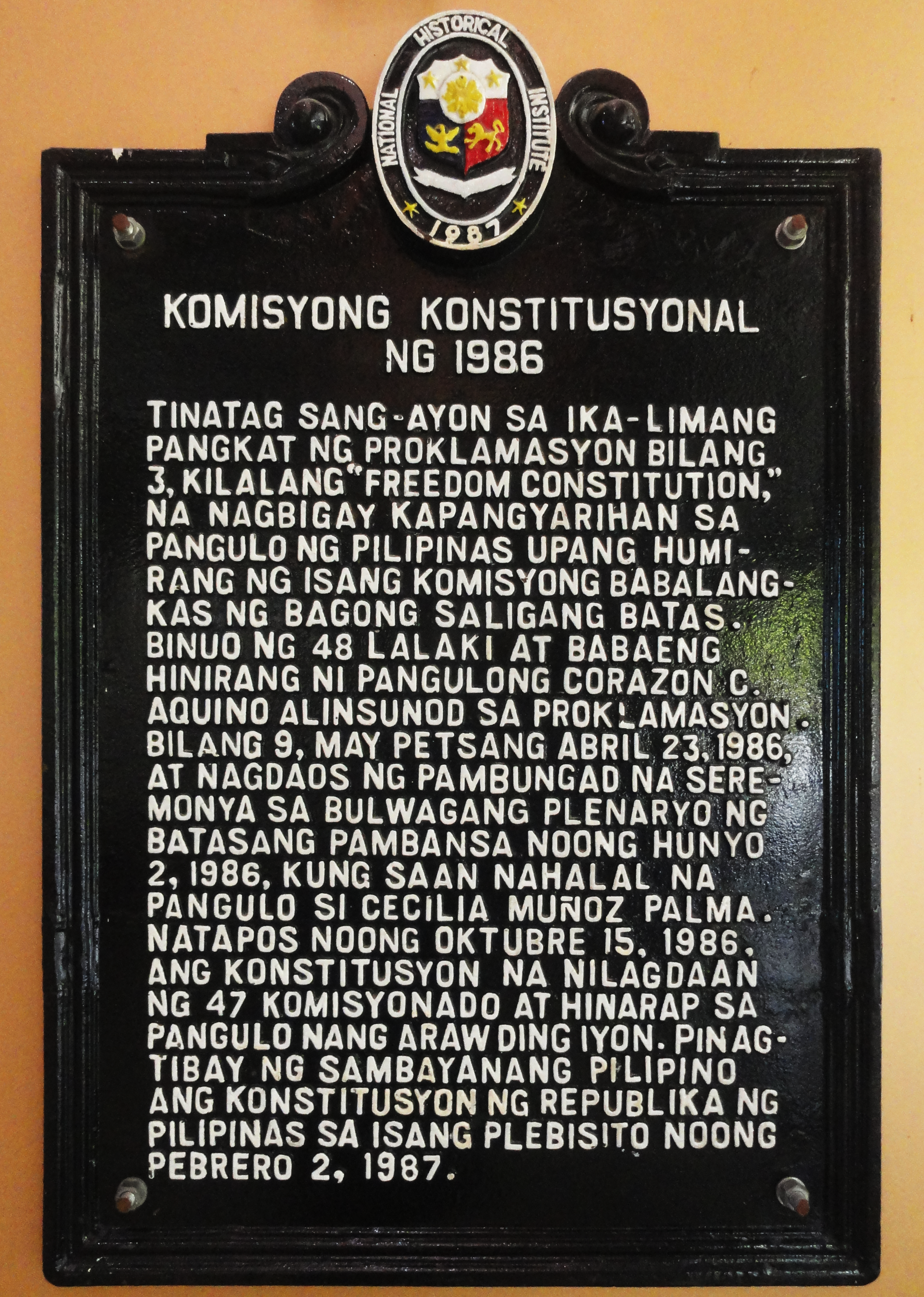
A historical marker issued by the National Historical Commission of the Philippines to commemorate the 1986 Philippine Constitutional Commission

Batasang Pambansa Complex

The Philippine Constitutional Commission of 1986 was the constitutional convention tasked with drafting the present iteration of the Constitution of the Philippines in 1986.

== Background ==
On March 25, 1986—exactly a month after the People Power revolt ended the 20-year rule of the late President Ferdinand Marcos Sr., President Corazon C. Aquino signed Presidential Proclamation No. 3, enacting a Provisional Constitution. The so-called "Freedom" Constitution granted Aquino vast authority from having sole legislative power to gaining control of and general supervision over all local governments. At the same time, however, she limited those powers since the Freedom Charter was only in place for less than a year.

In December 2024, Former Chief Justice Reynato Puno, one of the authors of the Freedom Constitution, stated that Aquino ordered the writing of the provisional charter as dictated by the unusual circumstances. Following Marcos’ ouster, the 1973 Constitution ceased to have any effect. With the abolition of Congress, leaving no agency or branch of office making laws, the Freedom Charter allowed Aquino to prioritize measures “to achieve the mandate” of the people while the branches of government were being reorganized:

- completely reorganize the government and eradicate unjust and oppressive structures, and all iniquitous vestiges of the previous administration;
- make effective the guarantees of civil, political, human, social, economic, and cultural rights and freedoms of the Filipino people, and provide remedies against violations thereof;
- rehabilitate the economy and promote the nationalist aspirations of the people;
- recover ill-gotten properties amassed by the leaders and supporters of the previous administration and protect the interest of the people through orders of sequestration or freezing of assets of accounts;
- eradicate graft and corruption in government and punish those guilty thereof; and
- restore peace and order, settle the problem of insurgency, and pursue national reconciliation based on justice.

Furthermore, she was presented with three options: restore the 1935 Constitution; retain and reform the 1973 Constitution; or pass a new constitution. As such, in the Freedom Constitution was Article V, which called for the adoption of a new constitution, to be composed of "not less than 30 nor more than 50 natural born citizens of the Philippines, of recognized probity, known for their independence, nationalism and patriotism." Its members would be chosen by the President after consultation with various sectors of society.

== History ==
The 1986 ConCom was convened three months after the EDSA People Power, when in April, President Aquino signed Proclamation No. 9, announcing her administration’s plans to convene the ConCom, inviting the public to submit nominations. The nominees were endorsed by various political groups and sectors, with their names published in the major newspapers along with the individuals and organizations which endorsed them.

Fresh from the events of February 1986, the People Power euphoria remained, with a general confidence that the deliberative body would bring about the necessary structural reforms in a much weakened Philippine society

The first 44 appointees were announced on May 25, 1986 during the “Reunion of EDSA Heroes” held at Camp Aguinaldo. 5 seats were offered to the opposition party Kilusang Bagong Lipunan (KBL) founded by Ferdinand Marcos and the remaining slot was offered to the Iglesia ni Cristo (INC). 4 slots were eventually filled by KBL while the INC declined the lone seat offered to it.

The ConCom formally convened on June 2, 1986 at the plenary hall of the Batasang Pambansa Complex. Elected officers of the ConCom were former Supreme Court Justice Cecilia Muñoz Palma (the first woman appointed to the Supreme Court of the Philippines) as President, former Senator Ambrosio Padilla as Vice President, and 1971 ConCon delegate Napoleon Rama as Floor Leader. In the formation of the various committees, the leadership asked each of the Commissioners a list of their priority or preferred committees. Based on these lists, the leadership decided on the committee assignments, including the chairs and vice-chairs of each committee.

It was hoped that the Commission would complete its work within as short a period, with the need to return to a normal constitutional government truly reflective of the ideals and aspirations of the Filipino people. However, given the extensive and monumental work in drafting a new constitution facing the commissioners and their staff, they were unable to meet the September 2, 1986 completion date. Instead, they were only able to finish their work on October 12.

== Sessions ==
- Regular Session: June 2 – October 15, 1986

== Legislation ==
Drafting	Enactment	Ratification
1987 Constitution
Approval	October 12, 1986	October 15, 1986
Ratification	October 15, 1986	February 2, 1987

== Leadership ==
President of the Commission

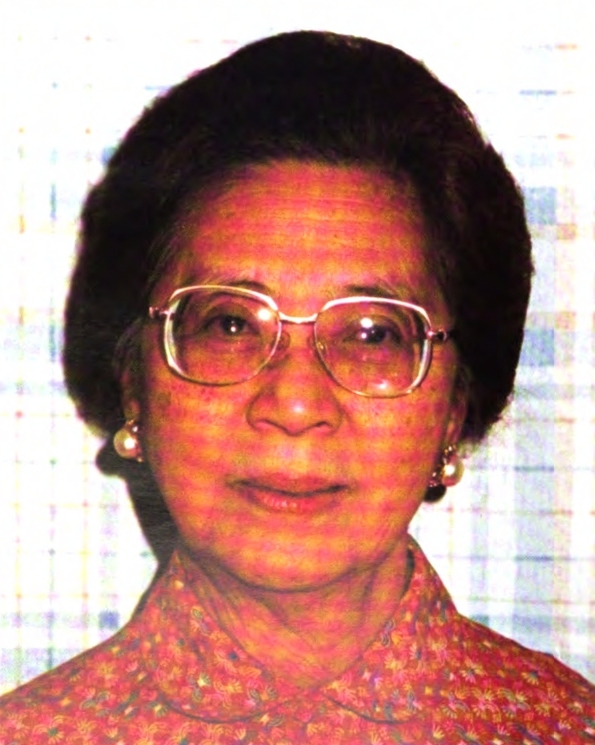
Cecilia Muñoz-Palma

- President: Cecilia Muñoz-Palma
- Vice President: Ambrosio Padilla
- Floor Leader: Napoleon Rama
- Assistant Floor Leaders:
  - Jose D. Calderon
  - Domocao Alonto
- Secretary General: Flerida Ruth Pineda-Romero

== Members ==
A nomination process was held to select the members of the commission. The commission was composed of 48 national, regional, and sectoral representatives, which included lawyers, entrepreneurs, politicians, landlords, health professionals, religious leaders, labor and peasant leaders, university professors, and journalists.

- Yusup Abubakar
- Domocao Alonto
- Felicitas Aquino
- Adolfo Azcuna
- Teodoro Bacani Jr.
- Jose Bengzon Jr.
- Ponciano Bennagen
- Joaquin Bernas
- Lino Brocka (Note: Lino Brocka resigned on August 28, 1986.)
- Jose Calderon
- Jose Colayco
- Roberto Concepcion
- Hilario Davide Jr.
- Crispino de Castro
- Rustico de los Reyes Jr.
- Vicente Foz
- Ed Garcia
- Chito Gascon
- Serafin Guingona
- Alberto Jamir
- Jose Laurel Jr.
- Eulogio Lerum
- Regalado Maambong
- Christian Monsod
- Cecilia Muñoz-Palma
- Teodulo Natividad
- Maria Teresa Nieva
- Jose Nolledo
- Blas Ople
- Ambrosio Padilla
- Minda Luz Quesada
- Napoleon Rama
- Florenz Regalado
- Cirilo Rigos
- Soc Rodrigo
- Ricardo Romulo
- Decoroso Rosales
- Florangel Rosario-Braid
- Rene Sarmiento
- Jose Suarez
- Lorenzo Sumulong
- Jaime Tadeo
- Mary Christine Tan
- Gregorio Tingson
- Efrain Treñas
- Lugum Uka
- Wilfrido Villacorta
- Bernardo Villegas

== Committees ==
Committee	Chairperson	Vice Chairperson
Accountability of Public Officers	Christian Monsod	Jose Colayco
Amendments and Transitory Provisions	Jose Suarez	Blas Ople
Budget and Personnel	Serafin Guingona	Jose Colayco
Citizenship, Bill of Rights, Political Rights and Obligations and Human Rights	Jose B. Laurel Jr.	Joaquin Bernas
Constitutional Commissions and Agencies	Vicente Foz	Cirilo Rigos
Executive	Lorenzo Sumulong	Florenz Regalado
General Provisions	Florangel Rosario-Braid	Teodoro Bacani Jr.
Human Resources	Wilfrido Villacorta	Lugum Uka
Judiciary	Roberto Concepcion	Ricardo Romulo
Legislative	Hilario Davide Jr.	Adolfo Azcuna
Local Governments	Jose Nolledo	Jose D. Calderon
National Economy and Patrimony	Bernardo Villegas	Jaime Tadeo
Preamble, National Territory, and Declaration of Principles	Decoroso Rosales	Gregorio Tingson
Privileges	Yusup Abubakar	Minda Luz Quesada
Social Justice and Social Services	Maria Teresa Nieva	Chito Gascon
Sponsorship	Serafin Guingona	Ed Garcia
Steering	Jose Bengzon Jr.	Napoleon Rama
Style	Soc Rodrigo	Efrain Treñas

== See also ==
- First Philippine Commission
- Second Philippine Commission
- Congress of the Philippines
- Senate of the Philippines
- House of Representatives of the Philippines
