= Ben Farrales =

Filipino fashion designer (1932–2021)

- Born: July 1, 1932; Cotabato, Cotabato, Philippine Commonwealth
- Died: March 6, 2021 (aged 88)
- Occupation: Fashion designer

Ben Farrales (1 July 1932 – 6 March 2021) was a Filipino fashion designer most known for his Muslim-inspired dress designs.

== Early life and education ==
Farrales was born on July 1, 1932, in Cotabato City to Salvador Farrales and Paulina Samio. He attended San Beda College for his early education. Flunking math, Farrales also had to repeat the subject in Cotabato, where he took note of the attires worn by Muslim women in the area.

Faralles attended the University of Santo Tomas (UST) for his collegiate studies where he pursued a degree on fine arts. By the time he was a freshman college student, he was working part-time in a department store in Manila which is often patronized by wealthy women.

== Career ==
Ben Farrales, affectionately called "Mang Ben" had been a fashion designer for more than 60 years and had high-profile actresses and socialites as his clients. He became known as the "Dean of Philippine Fashion", a title given to him by socialite and Karilagan Arts International founder Conching Sunito in his 30s. He is known for his Muslim-inspired ternos. He was also the first Filipino to organize a fashion show at the Manila Hotel in 1959 and the Kennedy Center in Washington, D.C., in the United States in 1984.

He was designer of Ruffa Gutierrez's Sarimanok-inspired dress which she wore at the Miss World 1993 beauty pageant.

Farrales has received various awards and recognitions for his works; including being named Outstanding Filipino (TOFIL), and recognitions from the Philippine Red Cross and his alma mater San Beda University. He has also received an award from the Cultural Center of the Philippines in 2015. He has also been endorsed to be named as a National Artist for fashion design.

== Death ==
Farrales died on March 6, 2021, at the age of 88.
