= Ed Garcia =

Filipino human rights activist, peace advocate & writer (born 1943)

Edmundo "Ed" Guidote Garcia
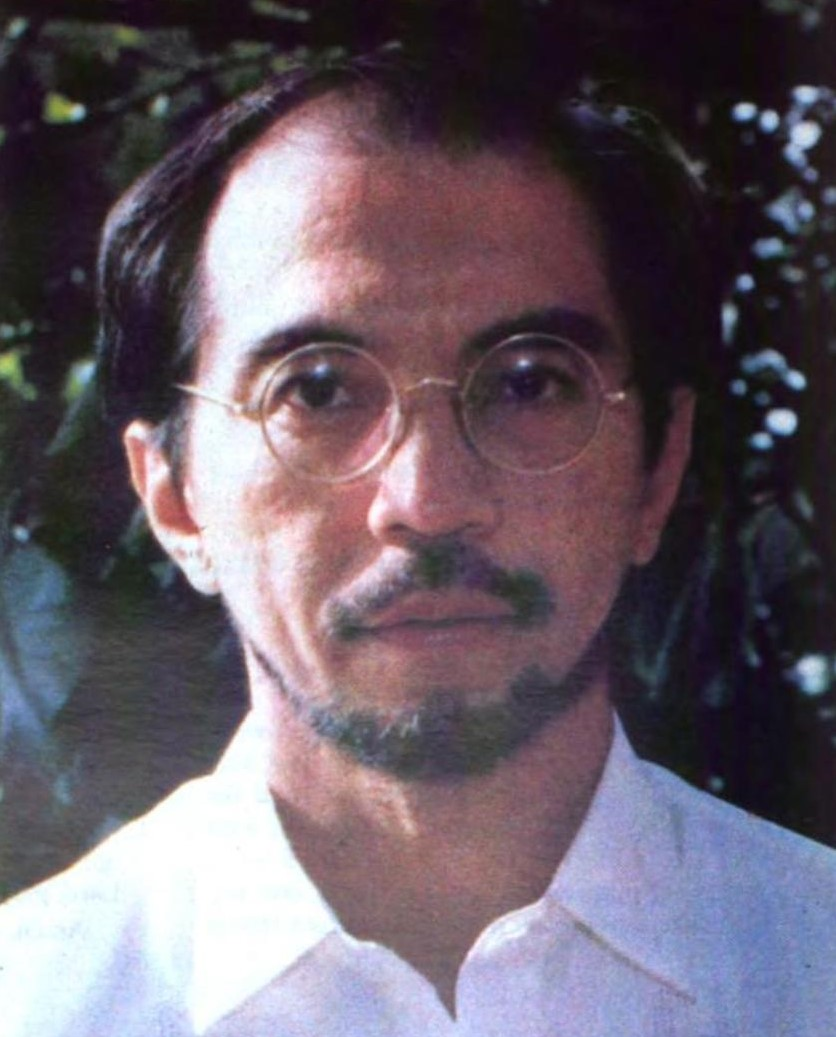
- Garcia from the Official Directory of the Constitutional Commission, c. 1986

Member of the Philippine Constitutional Commission
- In office June 2, 1986 – October 15, 1986
- President: Corazon Aquino

Personal details
- Born: February 3, 1943 (age 83) Manila, Philippines
- Education: Ateneo de Manila University
- Occupation: Human rights activist

Edmundo "Ed" Guidote Garcia (born February 3, 1943) is a Filipino human rights activist, peace advocate, and writer.

Garcia is best known for having served as one of the framers of the 1987 Philippine Constitution wherein which he advocated for the inclusion of human rights and social justice provisions in the charter, under the mentorship of CHR chairman and the acknowledged "Father of Human Rights" Jose W. Diokno.

In 1970, then a seminarist, he co-founded the militant youth political movement LAKASDIWA (Lakas ng Diwang Kayumanggi). The movement and its distinct political ideology (Filipino Social Democracy) sought to create a nonviolent path towards social change through a "parliamentary of the streets," drawing from diverse sources such as Mahatma Gandhi, Martin Luther King, Jr., Liberation Theology, including indigenous philosophies. The group was conceived as an alternative to the Marxist-Leninist-Maoist (MLM) ideology of the Communist Party of the Philippines (CPP) and the National Democratic Front (NDF) which called for armed struggle.

== Early life and education ==
Garcia received his early education at the Ateneo de Manila University. Among his professors were the Filipino Jesuits Horacio de la Costa and Roque Ferriols. A seminarist, he finished his degree in philosophy at the Loyola House of Studies, School of Theology. His postgraduate studies came at Universidad Javeriana in Bogota, Universidad Catolica in Lima, and Universidad Nacional Autonoma de Mexico in Mexico City.

He did further studies on peace research at the University of Uppsala Peace Conflict Analysis Centre and the University of Oslo Blindhern Campus. He also did a fellowship at the University of Otago Peace Centre in Dunedin, New Zealand.

In 1970, then a seminarian, he co-founded the militant youth political movement LAKASDIWA (Lakas ng Diwang Kayumanggi). The movement and its distinct political ideology (Filipino Social Democracy) sought to create a nonviolent path towards social change through a "parliamentary of the streets," drawing from diverse sources such as Mahatma Gandhi, Martin Luther King, Jr., Liberation Theology, including indigenous philosophies. The group was conceived as an alternative to the Marxist-Leninist-Maoist (MLM) ideology of the Communist Party of the Philippines (CPP) and the National Democratic Front (NDF) which called for armed struggle.

== Career ==
Garcia served as researcher at the international secretariat of Amnesty International and is a member of the board of trustees of its local chapter. He also served as peace envoy and policy adviser at International Alert, a non-governmental peace-building organization working in Asia, Latin America, Africa, and Europe.

He taught at Colegio de Mexico in the 1970s and regularly lectured at Escola de Pau (School of Peace) at Universitat de Barcelona and at the Erasmus Program on Human Rights, Migration, and Development at University of Bologna. Garcia also taught political science at the University of the Philippines and Latin American Studies at the Ateneo de Manila University. Garcia currently serves as consultant for the formation of scholar-athletes at Far Eastern University.

He has written several opinion pieces published in the online news website Rappler.

== Political involvement ==
In 1970, Garcia co-founded the militant youth political movement LAKASDIWA (Lakas ng Diwang Kayumanggi). The movement and its distinct political ideology (Filipino Social Democracy) sought to create a nonviolent path towards social change, drawing from diverse sources such as Mahatma Gandhi, Martin Luther King, Jr., and Liberation Theology, including indigenous philosophies. The tambuli (carabao horn) was used as a symbol of the group.

LAKASDIWA was conceived as an alternative to the Marxist-Leninist-Maoist (MLM) ideology of the CPP-NPA-NDF which called for armed struggle. Among Marxists and more radical formations, the movement was often derided as being too moderate and bourgeois, and its members branded as "clerico-fascists," alluding to its close ties to the Catholic hierarchy and the Jesuit-run Ateneo de Manila University. During martial law, members of LAKASDIWA formed the Partido Demokratiko Sosyalista ng Pilipinas that also shared a Social Democratic alternative to the Marcos regime. Later, Garcia became a member of KAAKBAY, a broad nationalist political movement against the Marcos dictatorship led by imprisoned senator Jose W. Diokno. In May 1985, Garcia was elected deputy secretary-general of the newly established Bagong Alyansang Makabayan (Bayan).

After the 1986 People Power Revolution which ended the Marcos regime, Garcia was appointed by the Aquino government as a representative in the 1986 Constitutional Commission tasked to create a "Freedom Constitution." He served as one of the framers of the 1987 Philippine Constitution and together with youth representative Chito Gascon were key advocates for the inclusion of human rights and social justice provisions in the charter; he consulted Diokno a fortnight before the plebiscite.

Garcia later helped establish the Kilusan Laban sa Kudeta (KILOS) in 1989 during the turbulent Aquino years and participated in the Coalition for Peace in 1986, the Gaston Z. Ortigas (GZO) Peace Institute in 1989, and the Multi-Sectoral Peace Advocates and the National Peace Conference in 1990. Garcia is also one of the Board of Directors of the Jose W. Diokno Foundation.

== Recognition ==
In 2015, Garcia was conferred the Parangal Lingkod Sambayanan, a public service award by the Ateneo de Manila University.

== Selected works ==
- A Journey of Hope. (1987).
- The Filipino Quest. (1988). Claretian Publications.
- The Sovereign Quest. (1988). Claretian Publications.
- The Unfinished Quest. (1989). Claretian Publications.
- "A Man of Uncommon Valor" (on Jose W. Diokno). In Six Modern Filipino Heroes. (1993).
- Courage!. (2018). Jesuit Communications Office.
- Stories and Struggle: SocDem Narratives. (2020).
- Dugout Diaries: The Championship Run. (2020). Far Eastern University.
- Defiant Hope: Quarantine Stories from a Distance. (2020). ABS-CBN Books.
- Seachange! Successor Generation (2020). ABS-CBN Books.
- Companions: XJ Narratives (2021). (Co-editor). San Anselmo Press.
- Servant Leader: Leni Robredo. (2020/2022). San Anselmo Press.
- Reinventing Resistance: Memoirs of an Accidental Activist. (2025). San Anselmo Press.
- Chronicle of a Life Untold. A Testament of Hope. (2026). San Anselmo Press.
