= 1962–63 President of the Senate of the Philippines election =

23rd leadership election in the Philippine Senate

- January 24, 1962 – April 5, 1963

All 24 members of the Senate 13 votes needed to win
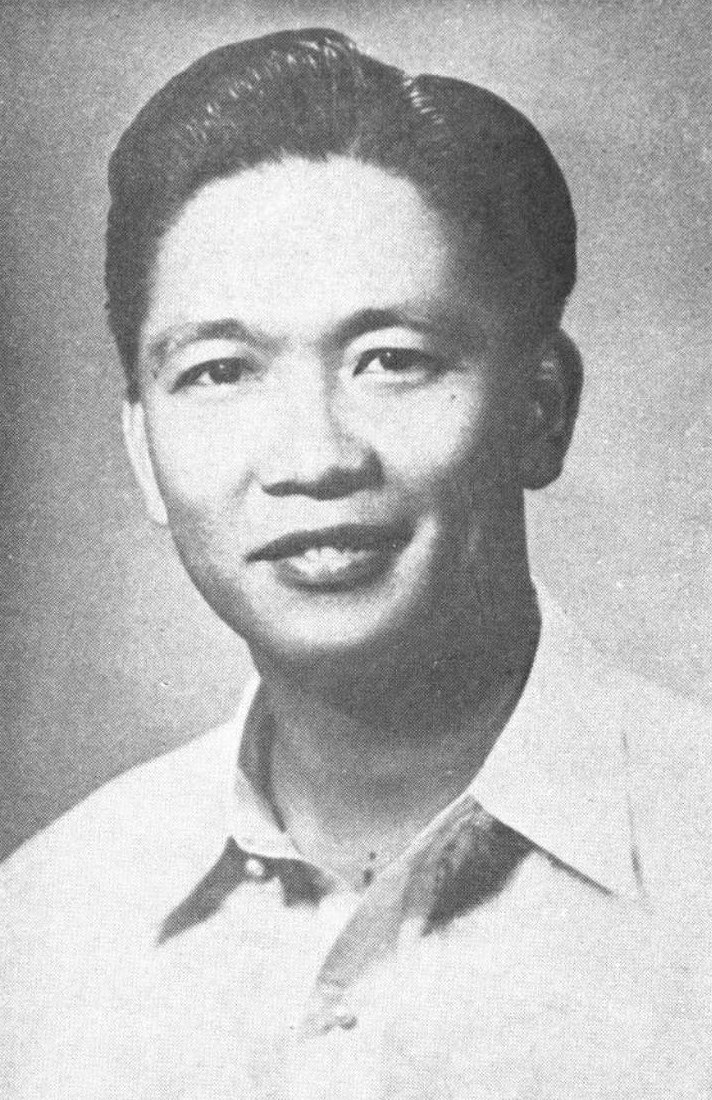

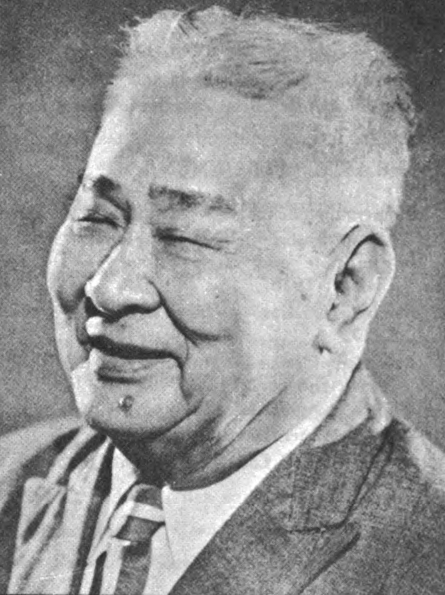

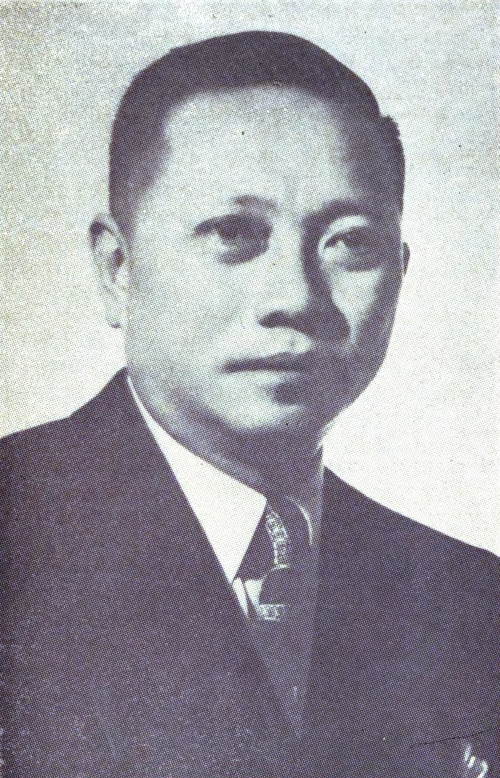
Nominee	Ferdinand Marcos	Eulogio Rodriguez	Fernando Lopez
Party	Liberal	Nacionalista	Nacionalista
First ballot	12 (50.00%)	Did not contest	12 (50.00%)
Final ballot	13 (54.17%)	11 (45.83%)	Did not contest
Senate President before election
Eulogio Rodriguez
Nacionalista
Elected Senate President
Ferdinand Marcos
Liberal

An election for the president of the Senate of the Philippines was held on January 24, 1962, two days after the opening session of the 5th Congress. It was the 23rd election for the Senate presidency in the chamber's history. Senate President pro tempore Fernando Lopez and Senate Minority Leader Ferdinand Marcos were the nominees of the Nacionalista Party and Liberal Party, respectively. Across the first four ballots, the vote was tied at 12–12, resulting in a deadlock that lasted for at least a month.

Incumbent Senate President Eulogio Rodriguez served in a holdover capacity from the 4th Congress until he was unseated by Marcos in a deciding ballot on April 5, 1963. This was also the election during which Senator Roseller T. Lim delivered the longest filibuster in Philippine Senate history, lasting a record 18 hours and 30 minutes.

== Background ==
The vote, originally scheduled for January 22, 1962, during the opening session of the 5th Congress, was postponed until two days later after a motion by Senator Estanislao Fernandez was approved. The postponement was intended to allow both parties to deliberate on their respective nominees and to retain the incumbent officers in a holdover capacity pursuant to the rules of the Senate.

== Electoral system ==
The Senate president is elected by a majority vote of the members of the Senate from among themselves. Since there are 24 senators, 13 votes are needed to win the Senate presidency, including any vacant seats or senators not attending the session. Although Senate presidents are elected at the start of each Congress, there had been numerous instances of Senate leadership elections in which a sitting Senate president has been unseated in the middle of a session. Term-sharing agreements among senators who are both eyeing the position of the Senate president also played a role in changing the leadership of the Senate, but in a smooth manner, through the peaceful transition of power. Three known instances were in 1999, 2006, and 2018.

Newly elected Senate presidents are traditionally sworn in by the youngest senator, known as the "Benjamin" of the chamber, usually one belonging to the majority bloc, as in the cases of Bam Aquino administering the oath of office to Franklin Drilon in 2013, Manny Pacquiao to Koko Pimentel in 2016, Mark Villar to Francis Escudero in 2024, and Camille Villar to Alan Peter Cayetano in 2026.

Unlike the symbolic presiding officers of upper houses in some other governments, the Senate president of the Philippines has considerable power to influence the legislative agenda, and has a normal vote rather than acting only as a tie-breaker, though the tradition that the presiding officer is the last to vote has been maintained. A tied vote in the Senate therefore means that the motion is lost; the Senate president, having already voted in the normal way, cannot also cast a tie-breaking vote.

== Election ==
=== January–February 1962: First ballots ===
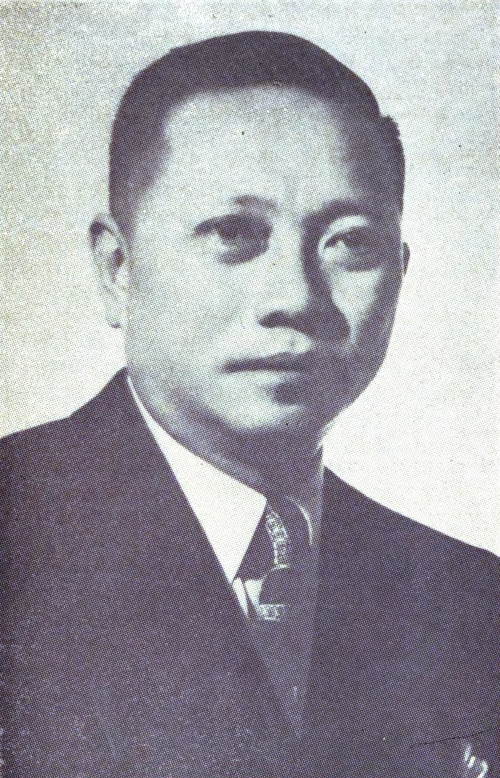
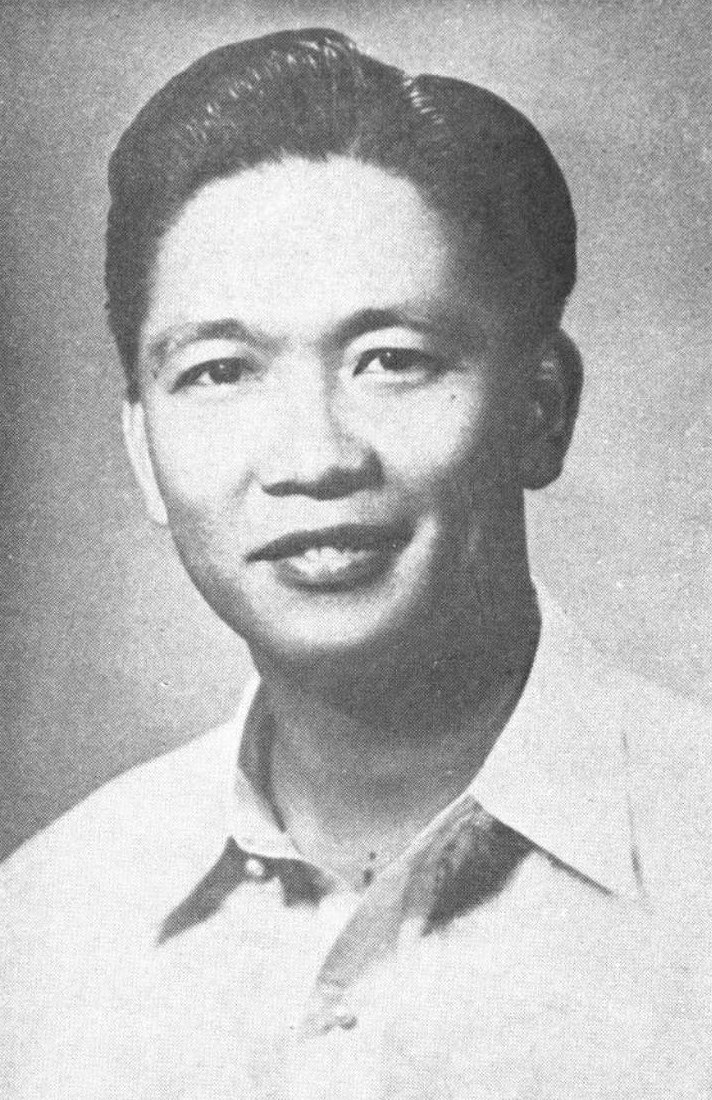
Nacionalista Party nominee Fernando Lopez (left) and Liberal Party nominee Ferdinand Marcos (right)

On January 24, Senator Arturo Tolentino nominated Fernando Lopez as the Nacionalista Party (NP) candidate for the Senate presidency to succeed Eulogio Rodriguez, which was seconded by Gil Puyat. On the part of the Liberals, Minority Leader Ferdinand Marcos was nominated by Raul Manglapus, with the nomination seconded by Maria Kalaw Katigbak and Camilo Osías. During the roll call for nominal voting, Lopez and Marcos voted for one another as a courtesy traditionally extended during elections for Senate president. All other Liberal senators voted for Marcos, while all other Nacionalistas, together with Lorenzo Tañada, a member of the Nationalist Citizens' Party who caucused with the NP, voted for Lopez. The result was a 12–12 deadlock, which persisted through the next three ballots held on January 26, January 29, and February 26.

As stated in Cunanan v. Tan (1962), Eulogio Rodriguez served in a holdover capacity as Senate president while no candidate had obtained the required majority of 13 votes in any of the ballots.

1962 election for president of the Senate (first four ballots)
Party	Nominees	1st ballot January 24		2nd ballot January 26		3rd ballot January 29		4th ballot February 26	
Party	Nominees	Votes	%	Votes	%	Votes	%	Votes	%
Nacionalista	Fernando Lopez	12	50.00	12	50.00	12	50.00	12	50.00
Liberal	Ferdinand Marcos	12	50.00	12	50.00	12	50.00	12	50.00
Total votes		24	100.00	24	100.00	24	100.00	24	100.00

List of senators who participated in the election
No.	Senator	Party	Ballot vote cast			
No.	Senator	Party	1st ballot January 24	2nd ballot January 26	3rd ballot January 29	4th ballot February 26
1	Alejandro Almendras	Nacionalista	Lopez			
2	Gaudencio Antonino	Liberal	Marcos			
3	Eulogio Balao	Liberal	Marcos			
4	Mariano Jesús Cuenco	Liberal	Marcos			
5	Rogelio dela Rosa	Liberal	Marcos			
6	Estanislao Fernandez	Liberal	Marcos			
7	Maria Kalaw Katigbak	Liberal	Marcos			
8	Oscar Ledesma	Nacionalista	Lopez			
9	Roseller T. Lim	Nacionalista	Lopez			
10	Fernando Lopez	Nacionalista	Marcos (Note: It is common tradition for senators who are nominees for the Senate presidency to vote for their opponent.)			
11	Genaro Magsaysay	Nacionalista	Lopez			
12	Manuel Manahan	Liberal	Marcos			
13	Raul Manglapus	Liberal	Marcos			
14	Ferdinand Marcos	Liberal	Lopez			
15	Camilo Osías	Liberal	Marcos			
16	Ambrosio Padilla	Liberal	Marcos			
17	Cipriano Primicias Sr.	Nacionalista	Lopez			
18	Gil Puyat	Nacionalista	Lopez			
19	Soc Rodrigo	Liberal	Marcos			
20	Eulogio Rodriguez	Nacionalista	Lopez			
21	Jose Roy	Nacionalista	Lopez			
22	Lorenzo Sumulong	Nacionalista	Lopez			
23	Lorenzo Tañada	NCP	Lopez			
24	Arturo Tolentino	Nacionalista	Lopez			

=== April 5, 1963: Roseller T. Lim's "Great Filibuster" and final ballot ===
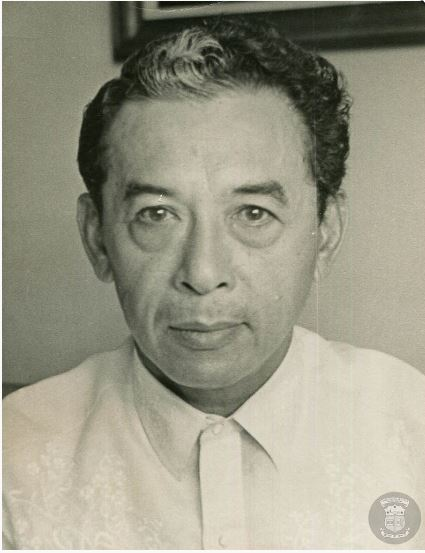
Senator Roseller T. Lim

Only 23 senators were present during the early stages of the Senate session on April 5, 1963, as Senator Alejandro Almendras was in the United States for a purported throat operation. Members of the Nacionalista Party sought to delay the vote for the Senate presidency until Almendras's arrival, as they needed his vote to block the ouster of incumbent Senate president Eulogio Rodriguez. On the eve of the vote, Senate Minority Leader Ferdinand Marcos reportedly visited Roseller T. Lim, a Nacionalista senator, and offered to pay the latter's loan, knowing that the Government Service Insurance System (GSIS) was foreclosing on the mortgage of Lim's residence. Lim refused and, during a party caucus, offered to filibuster until Almendras's return.

Lim spoke on the Senate floor for 18 hours and 30 minutes, sustaining himself only with water and even relieving himself while standing without taking restroom breaks. When Almendras entered the session hall, Lim ended his filibuster and the motion to put the question to a vote was taken up. Lim collapsed and was laid on a stretcher before being immediately transported by ambulance to a hospital. Hours later, upon waking, Lim was surprised to learn that Almendras had crossed the floor and voted for Marcos, much to his disappointment.

Marcos was elected Senate president, defeating Rodriguez by a vote of 13 to 11.

=== Results ===
1963 election for president of the Senate
Party	Nominees	Votes	%
Liberal	Ferdinand Marcos	13	54.17
Nacionalista	Eulogio Rodriguez (incumbent)	11	45.83
Total votes		24	100.00

List of senators who participated in the election
No.	Senator	Party	Ballot vote cast
1	Alejandro Almendras	Nacionalista	Marcos
2	Gaudencio Antonino	Liberal	Marcos
3	Eulogio Balao	Liberal	Marcos
4	Mariano Jesús Cuenco	Liberal	Marcos
5	Rogelio dela Rosa	Liberal	Marcos
6	Estanislao Fernandez	Liberal	Marcos
7	Maria Kalaw Katigbak	Liberal	Marcos
8	Oscar Ledesma	Nacionalista	Rodriguez
9	Roseller T. Lim	Nacionalista	Rodriguez
10	Fernando Lopez	Nacionalista	Rodriguez
11	Genaro Magsaysay	Nacionalista	Rodriguez
12	Manuel Manahan	Liberal	Marcos
13	Raul Manglapus	Liberal	Marcos
14	Ferdinand Marcos	Liberal	Marcos
15	Camilo Osías	Liberal	Marcos
16	Ambrosio Padilla	Liberal	Marcos
17	Cipriano Primicias Sr.	Nacionalista	Rodriguez
18	Gil Puyat	Nacionalista	Rodriguez
19	Soc Rodrigo	Liberal	Marcos
20	Eulogio Rodriguez	Nacionalista	Rodriguez
21	Jose Roy	Nacionalista	Rodriguez
22	Lorenzo Sumulong	Nacionalista	Rodriguez
23	Lorenzo Tañada	NCP	Rodriguez
24	Arturo Tolentino	Nacionalista	Rodriguez

== Aftermath ==
Marcos defected to the opposition Nacionalista Party in April 1964 after President Diosdado Macapagal reportedly refused to honor a prior agreement to field him as the Liberal Party's standard-bearer in the 1965 presidential election. Former Senate President Eulogio Rodriguez died in office several months later, on December 9, 1964.

Macapagal ran for re-election in November 1965 against Marcos and Raul Manglapus. Marcos won the election with 51% of the vote. Following Macapagal's defeat, Roseller T. Lim switched to the Liberal Party, where he remained until his death in 1976.
