= Edgardo Espiritu =

Filipino diplomat and politician (1935–2025)

The Honorable Edgardo Espiritu

24th Secretary of Finance
- In office July 1, 1998 – December 31, 1999
- President: Joseph Estrada
- Preceded by: Salvador Enriquez
- Succeeded by: Jose Pardo

Personal details
- Born: June 7, 1935
- Died: April 29, 2025 (aged 89) Los Angeles, California, U.S.
- Education: University of the Philippines Diliman
- Awards: The Outstanding Filipino (TOFIL) Award

Edgardo Bautista Espiritu (June 7, 1935 – April 29, 2025) was a Filipino lawyer, diplomat and banker. He served as Secretary of the Department of Finance during the Estrada administration before resigning and testifying against Estrada during the latter's impeachment trials.

Espiritu later served as Philippine Ambassador to the United Kingdom, Ireland, and Iceland.

== Background ==
Espiritu received his law degree from the University of the Philippines College of Law in 1958. He was a member of the Upsilon Sigma Phi fraternity.

Espiritu died on April 29, 2025, at the age of 89.

== Career ==
=== Banking and finance ===
Espiritu served as president of Metrobank, the Philippine National Bank, and Westmont Bank.

=== Secretary of Finance ===
Espiritu was appointed Secretary of Finance by President Joseph Estrada in 1998. He resigned in 1999 due to corruption in the Estrada administration.

Espiritu testified during the impeachment trial of President Estrada. He testified that Estrada held BW Resources stock and was making money from them. He flew to the US after receiving death threats.

=== Diplomatic career ===
Espiritu served as Philippine Ambassador to the United Kingdom, Ireland, and Iceland.

== Legacy ==
Espiritu was the longest-serving president of the University of the Philippines Alumni Association. During his term, he oversaw the construction of the Ang Bahay ng Alumni building located in the Diliman campus.

In 2019, Espiritu was conferred with the University of the Philippines Alumni Association's Most Distinguished Alumnus award. In 2020, the University of the Philippines conferred him with degree of Doctor of Laws honoris causa, cited for his "achievements and unimpeachable character in the areas of banking and finance, economics, public service, and entrepreneurship."

Espiritu was conferred The Outstanding Filipino (TOFIL) Award in 2013.
