= Asian Institute of Journalism and Communication =

Private college in Manila, Philippines

- Type: Private graduate school, non-sectarian
- Established: 1980
- President: Therese Patricia San Diego Torres
- Location: 2244 Espana Boulevard, Sampaloc, Manila, Philippines; 14°37′00″N 121°00′02″E
- Website: www.aijc.com.ph
- Location in Metro Manila Location in Luzon Location in the Philippines

The Asian Institute of Journalism and Communication is a graduate school in the Philippines. AIJC offers graduate programs in communication and journalism, provides professional training in various areas related to communication and leadership, and implements programs and projects in line with its advocacies. It is considered one of the leading communication institutions in the Philippines and the ASEAN region.

== History ==
The institute was established in 1980 as the Asian Institute of Journalism. In 1994, it was renamed the Asian Institute of Journalism and Communication.

== Research and development ==
AIJC's research program includes policy research; design, implementation and evaluation of development communication initiatives, public information, social mobilization and advocacy programs; and design and implementation of management information systems.

Many outputs of the Research, Policy, and Advocacy unit have been institutionalized in development programs. These outputs have been reflected or integrated in the following:

- 1987 Philippine Constitution
- Supreme Court Blueprint for Action on Judicial Reform
- Action Program for Judicial Reform
- Philippine Agenda 21
- Education for All program
- Country Program for Children
- Literacy Coordinating Council Blueprint for Action
- Communication plans of sustainable development programs, i.e., clean air, fisheries and coastal resource management, and renewable energy
