= Minda Luz Quesada =

Filipino activist (1937–1995)

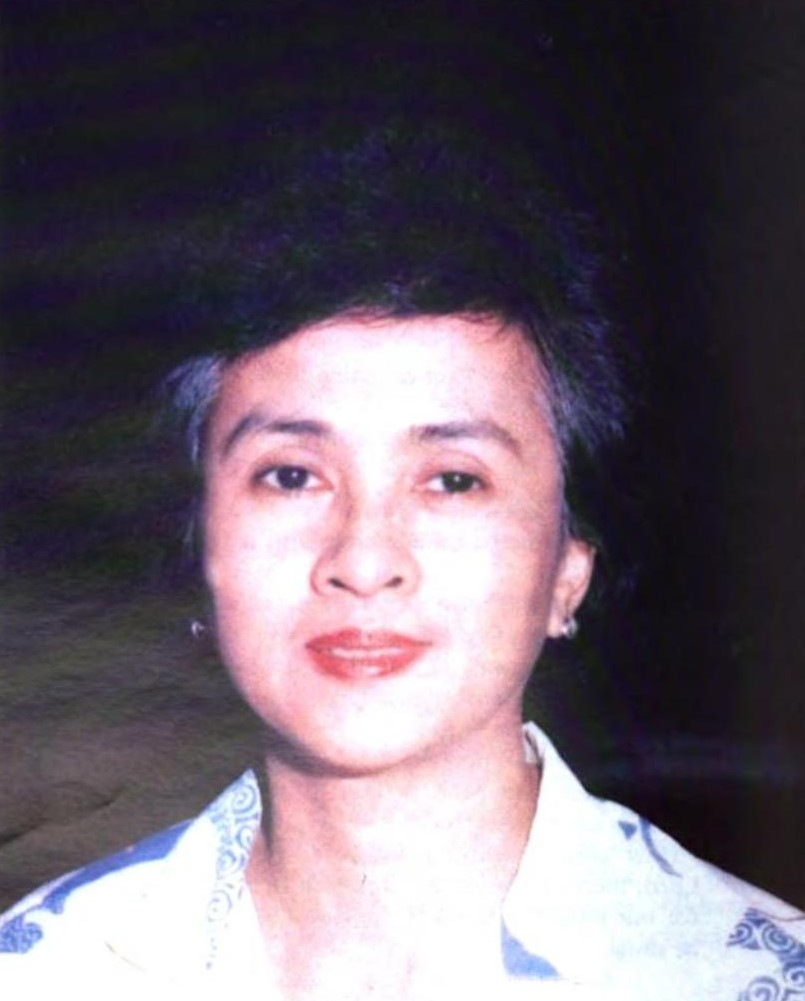
Quesada from the Official Directory of the Constitutional Commission, c. 1986

Minda Luz Reyes Melendez Quesada (1937–1995) was a Filipino nurse, educator, and activist best known for her work as part of the 1987 Constitutional Commission, her humanitarian and advocacy work during the Marcos dictatorship, and her leadership of the Alliance of Health Workers, a Philippine non-government organization which advocated for the rights of health workers and pushed for the Philippoines' Magna Carta of Public Health Workers.

It was through her work in the 1987 Constitutional Commission that healthcare was formally enshrined in the Philippine constitution as "a right of every Filipino citizen". In 2021, she was honored by having her name inscribed on the Wall of Remembrance of the Philippines' Bantayog ng mga Bayani, which recognizes the heroes and martyrs who fought the Marcos dictatorship.
