= Cecilia Muñoz-Palma =

Filipino judge from Batangas

The Honorable Cecilia Muñoz-Palma
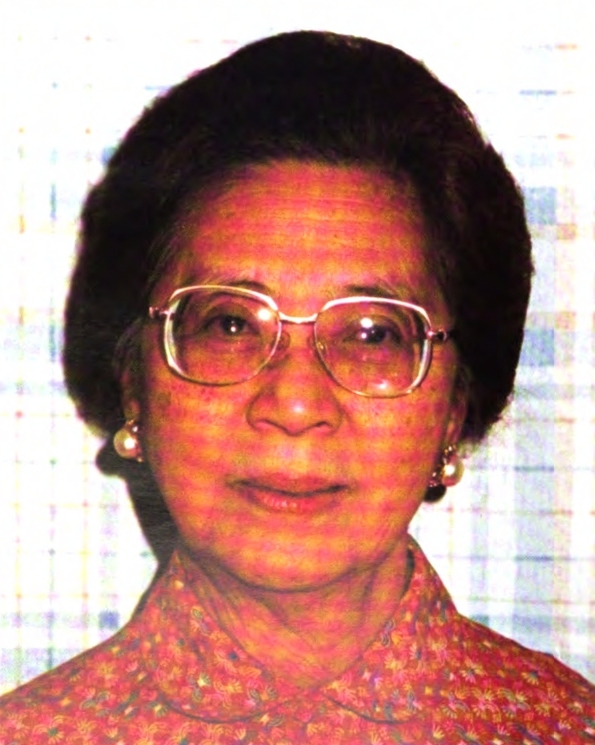
- Muñoz-Palma in 1986

Chairperson of the Philippine Charity Sweepstakes Office
- In office 1998 – January 31, 2000
- Appointed by: Joseph Estrada

Chairwoman of the 1986 Constitutional Commission
- In office June 2, 1986 – October 15, 1986
- Appointed by: Corazon Aquino

89th Associate Justice of the Supreme Court of the Philippines
- In office October 29, 1973 – November 22, 1978
- Appointed by: Ferdinand Marcos
- Preceded by: Newly created seat
- Succeeded by: Ameurfina Melencio-Herrera

Mambabatas Pambansa (Assemblywoman) from Quezon City
- In office June 30, 1984 – March 25, 1986 Serving with Ismael Mathay Jr., Orlando Mercado, and Alberto Romulo

Personal details
- Born: Cecilia Arreglado Muñoz; November 22, 1913 Bauan, Batangas, Philippine Islands
- Died: January 2, 2006 (aged 92) Quezon City, Philippines
- Resting place: Loyola Memorial Park Marikina, Philippines
- Party: UNIDO (1984–1986)
- Spouse: Rodolfo Palma
- Children: 3
- Education: University of the Philippines Manila (LL.B.); Yale University (LL.M.)

Cecilia Arreglado Muñoz-Palma (November 22, 1913 – January 2, 2006) was a Filipino jurist and the first woman appointed to the Supreme Court of the Philippines. She was appointed to the Supreme Court by President Ferdinand Marcos on October 29, 1973, and served until she reached the then-mandatory retirement age of 65.

While on the Court, Muñoz-Palma penned several opinions adverse to the martial law government of her appointer, President Marcos. After retiring from the Court, she became a leading figure in the political opposition against Marcos, and was elected to the Batasang Pambansa as an Assemblywoman from Quezon City. When Corazon Aquino was installed as president following the 1986 People Power Revolution, Muñoz-Palma was appointed chairwoman of the 1986 Constitutional Commission that drafted the 1987 Constitution.

== Background ==
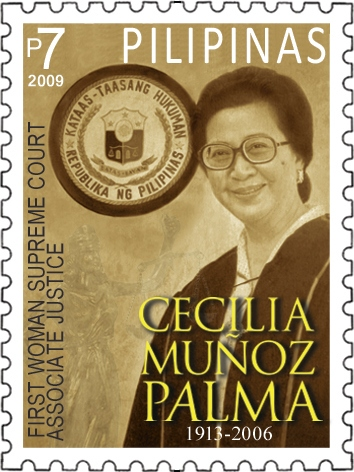
Muñoz-Palma as an Associate Justice of the Supreme Court on a 2009 stamp of the Philippines

The daughter of Pedro P. Muñoz, who would serve as representative from Batangas's 2nd district, Muñoz-Palma enrolled at St. Scholastica’s College in Manila and was the valedictorian of high school class of 1931. She earned her law degree from the University of the Philippines College of Law, and a Master of Laws degree from Yale Law School. She was the first woman to be elected as president of the College of Law student council (1936–37), president of the Portia Club, first place in the first oratorical contest held by the U.P. Debating Club (1934), and recipient of the Dr. Mendoza-Guanzon medal for excellence in oratory and the Justice Abad Santos medal for excellence in debating.

She topped the 1937 Philippine Bar exams with a 92.6% rating. She became the first woman prosecutor of Quezon City in 1947. Seven years later, she became the first female district judge when she was named a trial court judge for Negros Oriental. In the next few years, she was assigned as a judge to Laguna and Rizal until her appointment to the Court of Appeals in 1968, the second woman ever to be appointed to the appellate court. In 1973, she again made history, this time as the first female Supreme Court Associate Justice.

== Dissenter from martial rule ==
By the time she retired from the Court in 1978, Muñoz-Palma had become identified, along with Claudio Teehankee, as a dissenter from rulings that affirmed the decrees and actions enforced by her appointer, President Ferdinand Marcos, during his martial law rule. As early as 1975, she had expressed skepticism that "a referendum under martial rule can be of no far-reaching significance as it is accomplished under an atmosphere or climate of fear." (Aquino v. COMELEC, G.R. No. L-40004, January 31, 1975, J. Muñoz-Palma, Separate Opinion ) The following year, she voted against allowing Marcos the right to propose amendments to the Constitution by himself, and in doing so, ventured to call for the lifting of martial law itself. In a later dissent, she added that "under a martial law regime there is, undeniably, repression of certain rights and freedoms, and any opinion expressed would not pass the test of a free and untrammeled expression of the will of the people. That "(M)artial law connotes power of the gun, meant coercion by the military, and compulsion and intimidation" was so stated by President Ferdinand E. Marcos upon proclamation of martial law in the country."

== Opposition against Marcos ==
After her retirement from the Court, Muñoz-Palma emerged as a prominent figure in the anti-Marcos political opposition. In 1984, she was elected under the UNIDO banner to the Regular Batasang Pambansa as an Assemblywoman, representing Quezon City. She headed for a time a National Unification Council that sought to unify all anti-Marcos opposition groups. She also became an early supporter of the attempt to draft the then-reluctant Corazon Aquino to run for the presidency against Marcos.

== 1986 Constitutional Commission and later life ==
After Aquino assumed the presidency in 1986, Muñoz-Palma called in vain for the retention of the unicameral Batasang Pambansa as the country's legislative body but such plea was not heeded by the new President. Instead, the President dissolved it by means of a proclamation, which formed a provisional constitution that declares her government to be revolutionary and assumed legislative powers the now former Batasan held. When Aquino created the 1986 Constitutional Commission to draft the new Constitution, she appointed Muñoz-Palma as one of its members. The Commission would later elect her as its Chairwoman.

Following the ratification of the 1987 Constitution, Muñoz-Palma faded from the public eye. However, in 1992, President Fidel V. Ramos appointed Muñoz-Palma as a member of the Council of Advisers of the Moral Recovery Program, where she was elected as vice chairman in recognition of her non-political leadership. In 1998, she supported Vice-President Joseph Estrada for the presidency. After his election, Estrada appointed the 85-year-old Muñoz-Palma as Chairperson of the Philippine Charity Sweepstakes Office. She served in this capacity until her resignation on January 31, 2000. Muñoz-Palma strongly denounced the circumstances that led to Estrada's vacation of the presidency and the assumption into office of Gloria Macapagal Arroyo.

Muñoz-Palma died on January 2, 2006, at the age of 92.

=== Legacy ===
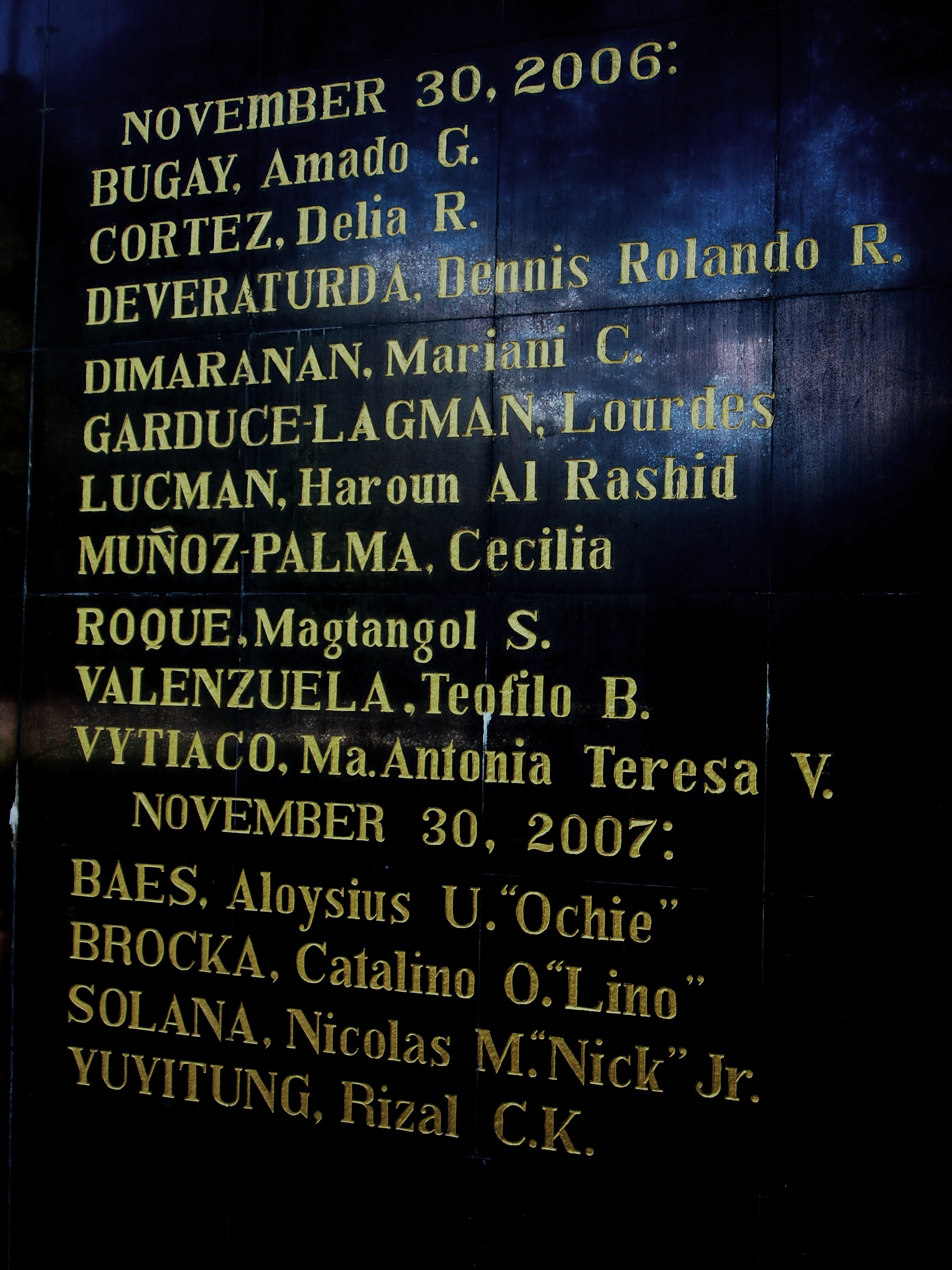
Detail of the Wall of Remembrance at the Bantayog ng mga Bayani, showing names from the 2006 batch of Bantayog Honorees, including that of Cecilia Muñoz-Palma.

On November 30, 2006, several months after her death, Muñoz-Palma's name was enshrined at the Bantayog ng mga Bayani, a monument dedicated to individuals who opposed the Marcos dictatorship and fought for the restoration of Philippine democracy.

Three years later, the International Women’s Forum inducted her into its International Hall of Fame. Her family and friends formed the Justice Cecilia Muñoz Palma Foundation to “continue what she started,” and was released in February 2009.

A street between the Bonifacio Shrine and Mehan Garden in Ermita, Manila was named in her memory.

== Personal life ==
Muñoz-Palma was married to Rodolfo C. Palma, a native of Tagbilaran, Bohol and a fellow law graduate of University of the Philippines. They have two sons and a daughter together.

== Some notable opinions ==
- Sanidad v. COMELEC (1976) – Dissenting
- People v. Mariano (1976)
- De la Llana v. COMELEC (1977) – Dissenting
- Peralta v. COMELEC (1978) – Dissenting
- Pamil v. Teleron (1978) – Dissenting
- People v. Purisima (1978)

== Notes ==
Legal offices
New seat	Associate Justice of the Supreme Court of the Philippines; 1973–1978	Succeeded by Ameurfina Melencio-Herrera
