= Chito Gascon =

Filipino lawyer, civil organizer, and human-rights activist (1964–2021)

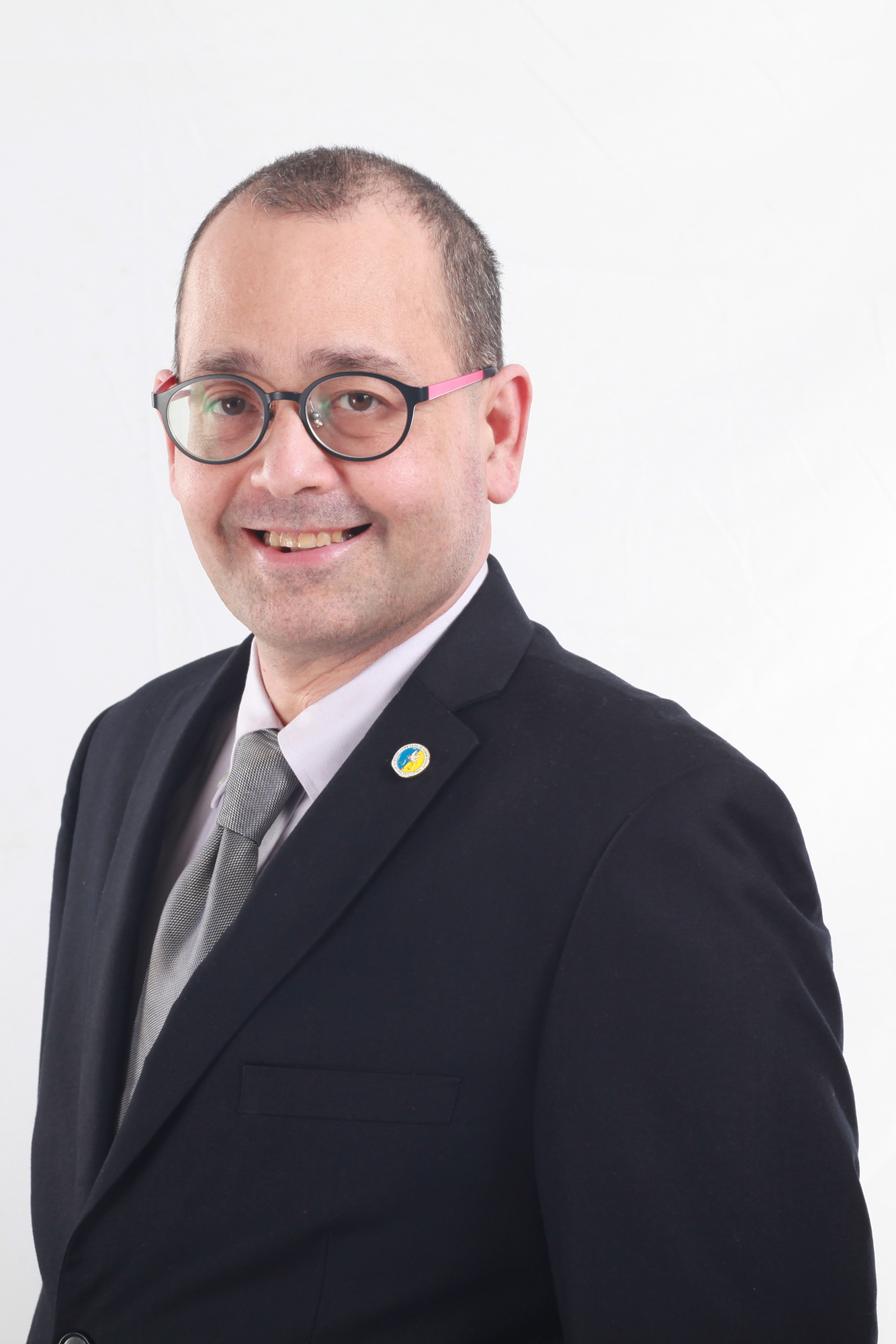
- Official portrait, 2017

7th Chairman of the Commission on Human Rights of the Philippines
- In office June 18, 2015 – October 9, 2021
- President: Benigno Aquino III; Rodrigo Duterte
- Preceded by: Etta Rosales
- Succeeded by: Leah Tanodra Armamento

Member of the Philippine House of Representatives for the Youth
- In office June 30, 1987 – June 30, 1992
- Appointed by: Corazon Aquino
- Preceded by: Office established
- Succeeded by: Edgar M. Avila; Cesar Chavez

Personal details
- Born: Jose Luis Martin Cosgayon Gascon; 26 May 1964
- Died: 9 October 2021 (aged 57) Metro Manila, Philippines
- Party: Liberal
- Education: University of the Philippines Diliman; St Edmund's College, Cambridge

Jose Luis Martin Cosgayon Gascon (Spanish: [xoˈse ˈlwis maɾˈtiŋ ɡasˈkon]; May 26, 1964 – October 9, 2021), also known as Chito Gascon (Spanish: [ˈtʃito ɣasˈkon]), was a Filipino lawyer, civic organizer, and human rights activist. In 2015, he was appointed by then President Benigno S. Aquino III as the Chair of the Commission on Human Rights of the Philippines serving a term from 2015 to 2021.

Prior his stint in the Commission on Human Rights, he served as member of the Human Rights Victims' Claims Board, which administered reparations for martial law victims.

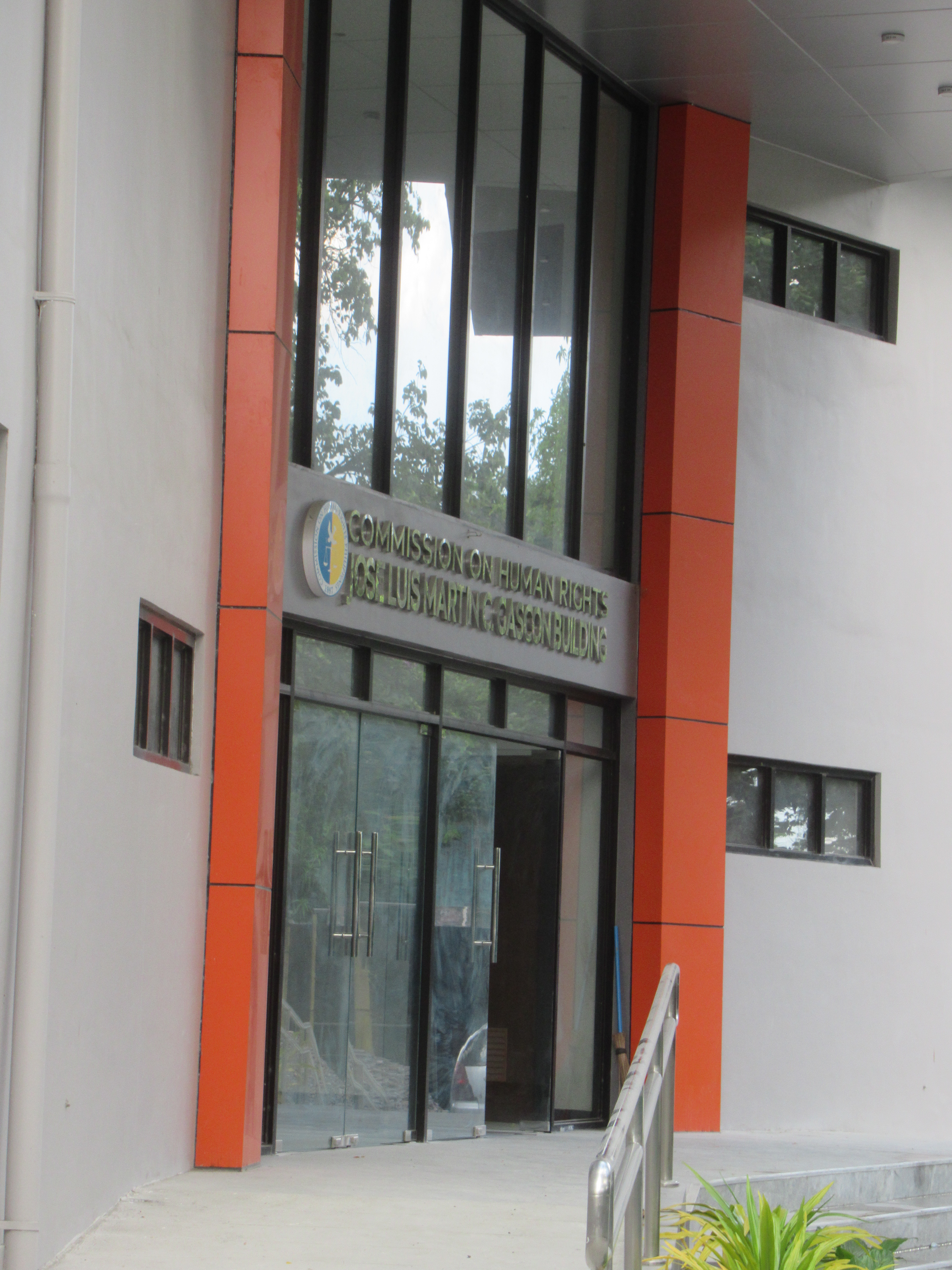
Jose Luis Gascon Commission on Human Rights building

He was the youngest member of the 1986 Constitutional Commission that drafted the 1987 Constitution of the Philippines. As a member of the Philippine House of Representatives representing the youth sector, he spearheaded the passage of pertinent legislation for the creation of the Sanggunian Kabataan (under the Local Government Code) and Republic Act 7610, a special law providing protection to children from abuse.

== Early life and education ==
Gascon graduated with a Bachelor of Arts in Philosophy in 1998 and Bachelor of Laws degree in 1996, both from the University of the Philippines, Diliman. He was elected president of the University of the Philippines Student Council under the student party Nagkaisang Tugon in 1985; he would be succeeded by Kiko Pangilinan under SAMASA a year later.

In 1997, he earned a Master of Law degree specializing in Human Rights, Law of Peace, and Settlement of International Disputes from St. Edmund's College, University of Cambridge.

He attended the 1997 Summer Institute on Human Rights administered by the International Institute for Human Rights with the European Human Rights Mechanisms in Strasbourg, France. He has also attended specialized seminars at the Theodor Heuss Academy for Freedom in Gummersbach, Germany and with the Center for Democratic Initiatives at the Australian National University in Canberra, Australia.

== Activism and civic work ==
Gascon was an active student leader during his time at the University of the Philippines. In the wake of the assassination of Senator Ninoy Aquino on August 21, 1983, he helped mobilize protest actions in schools demanding justice and radical political change.

In 1985, he was elected Chair of the University of the Philippines Student Council and led the youth movement that participated in the EDSA People Power Revolution. He organized Human Rights Awareness Fairs in campuses and was an active member of Amnesty International Philippine Section at which he served for many years as a board member.

He also actively campaigned for the release of Political Prisoners and visited detention centers with Lingap Bilanggo. He was a member of Liberal International's Human Rights Committee & was also alternate member in the Inter-Agency Committee on Extra-Judicial Killings and Enforced Disappearances established under AO 35. He was in the Official Delegation for the 2012 Universal Periodic Review at the Human Rights Council in Geneva that was led by then-Justice Secretary and former CHR Chair Leila De Lima.

He has been involved in many different civil society political alliances working for human rights and democracy such as the Kongreso ng Mamamayang Pilipino (KOMPIL 1 & 2), Bansang Nagkaisa sa Diwa at Layunin (BANDILA), the Black & White Movement, Social Liberals & Democrats for the Advancement of Reforms (SoLiDAR), and Re:Publika@DemokraXXIa - a new network of progressive activists. He was previously the executive director to both the liberal think tank National Institute for Policy Studies (NIPS) from 1987 to 2002 and LIBERTAS - a lawyers' network on the Rule of Law from 2005 to 2008.

He was founding trustee and corporate counsel of the International Center for Innovation, Transformation, and Excellence in Governance (InciteGov) - the policy group of the so-called "Hyatt 10," and was part of its Advisory Group. He was Founding Trustee of the Institute for Leadership, Empowerment, and Democracy (iLEAD) and was in the organizing committee of the Asian Democracy Network (ADN). He was Director General of the Liberal Party from 2008 to 2011 and was Political Director of its successful 2010 National Electoral Campaign.

He has taught law, Politics, & Human Rights at the Political Science Departments at both the Ateneo de Manila and De la Salle Universities. He was also a Fellow at the Robredo Institute of Governance (RSIG).

== Political career and public service ==
=== 1986 Constitutional Commission & 8th Philippine Congress ===
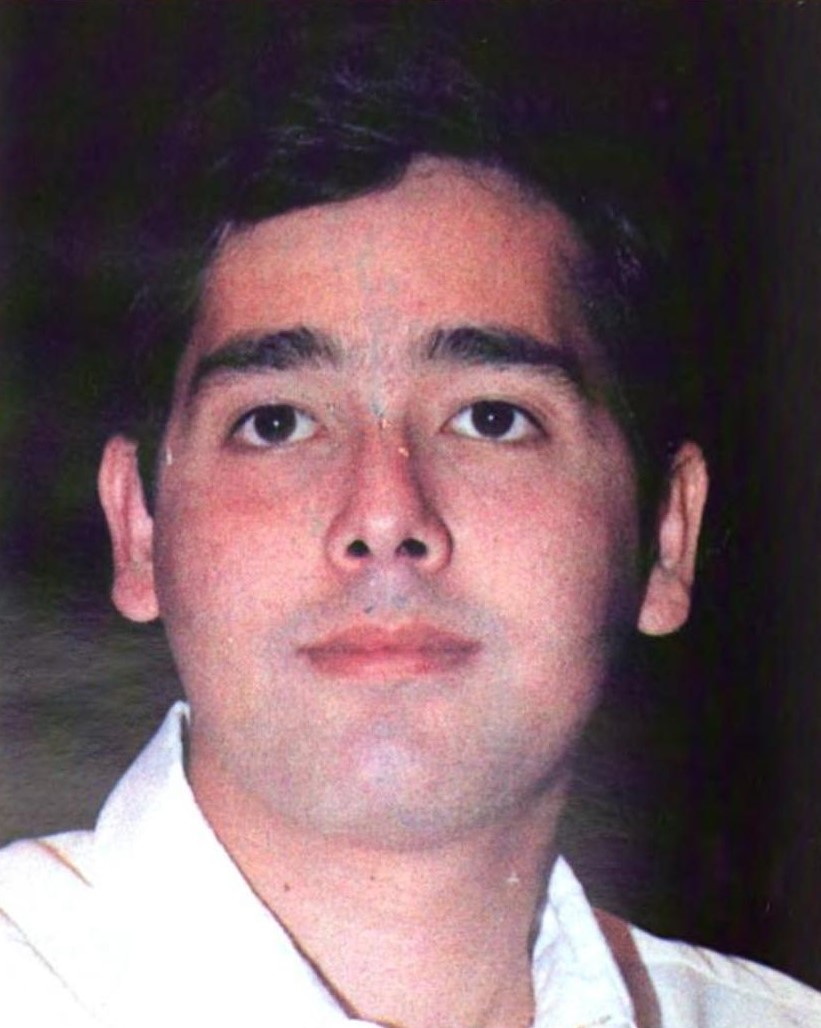
Gascon from the Official Directory of the Constitutional Commission, c. 1986

In the transition to democracy, during the term of President Corazon C. Aquino, Gascon served as the youngest member of the 1986 Constitutional Commission that drafted the 1987 Constitution and the 8th Philippine Congress, passing legislation that institutionalized youth participation in local government (Sangguniang Kabataan) as well as a special law providing for special protection of children from all forms of abuse (RA 7610).

=== Department of Education (2002-2005) ===
He has held several senior positions in government, such as separate stints as Undersecretary at the Department of Education (DepEd, from 2002 to 2005) and the Office of the President (Political Affairs, from 2011 to 2014). He was also a board member of the Bases Conversion and Development Authority (BCDA) from 2010 to 2011.

=== Peace Negotiations ===
He served as Panel Member at Peace Negotiations with the National Democratic Front (NDF) from 2001 to 2004 and had served as the chair from 2010 to 2014 of the Government's Human Rights Monitoring Committee (GPhMC) of that peace process within the framework of the Comprehensive Agreement on Respect for Human Rights and International Humanitarian Law (CARHRIHL).

He has also assisted in peace negotiations involving the conflict with Muslim rebels in Mindanao as a member of the Technical Working Group on Power Sharing and Alternate Panel Member in peace talks with the Moro Islamic Liberation Front (MILF), and with the Ad Hoc High-Level Working Group for the Tripartite Review of the 1996 Final Peace Agreement with the Moro National Liberation Front (MNLF) together with the Organization of Islamic Cooperation's Peace Committee for Southern Philippines.

=== Commission on Human Rights ===
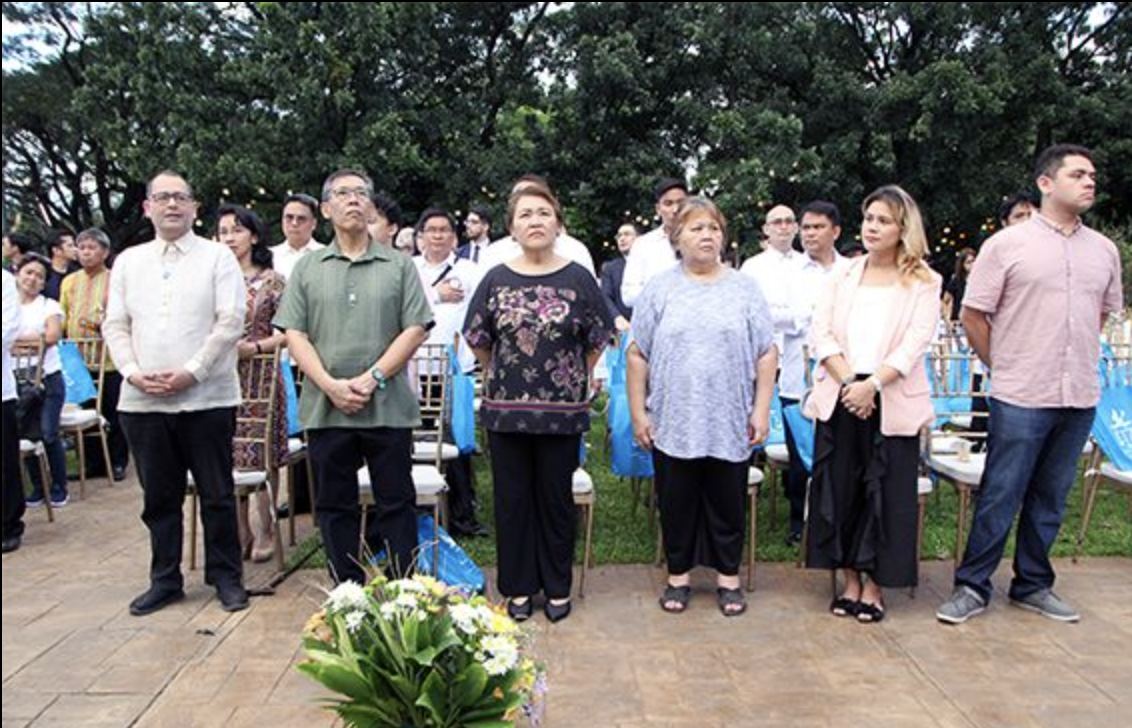
Gascon with Chel, Maris, and the Diokno family at Liwasang Diokno, CHR

On 18 June 2015, Gascon was appointed by President Benigno S. Aquino III as the new Chair of the Human Rights Commission of the Philippines for the 2015–2022 term. Gascon succeeded Etta Rosales who retired on May 5, 2015. Executive Director Marc Cabreros served as officer-in-charge of the commission after Rosales' resignation until Gascon's appointment.

== Awards and recognition ==
His continuing reform advocacies were in the areas of human rights, access to justice and the rule of law, transparency and accountability initiatives, political and electoral reforms, peace and conflict transformation, people's participation and civic education, and state building in the context of democratic transitions. Among the fellowships and recognitions he has received are:

- Benigno S. Aquino Fellowship for Public Service given by the US State Department's Embassy in the Philippines in 2001
- First Filipino recipient of both the Democracy and Development Fellowship at Stanford University's Center on Democracy, Development and the Rule of Law in 2005 and Reagan–Fascell Democracy Fellowship at the International Forum for Democratic Studies of the National Endowment for Democracy in 2006
- Asian Public Intellectual Fellowship given by the Nippon Foundation in 2007
- Asian Leadership Fellowship given by the Japan Foundation in 2008

== Personal life ==
He was married to Melissa P. Mercado and had a daughter, Ciara Sophia.

== Death ==
On October 9, 2021, his brother Miguel revealed in a Facebook post that Chito had died from COVID-19.

== See also ==
- Philippine Constitutional Commission of 1986
- Sanggunian Kabataan
- Commission on Human Rights (Philippines)

== Bibliography ==
- "Jose Luis Martin 'Chito' Gascon". Philippine Center for Investigative Journalism. 2 February 2006. Archived from the original on 16 July 2015.
