= Adolfo Azcuna =

Filipino jurist (born 1939)

The Honorable Adolfo S. Azcuna
- Azcuna in 2026

153rd Associate Justice of the Supreme Court of the Philippines
- In office October 24, 2002 – February 15, 2009
- Appointed by: Gloria Macapagal Arroyo
- Preceded by: Santiago M. Kapunan
- Succeeded by: Lucas P. Bersamin

Philippine Judicial Academy (PHILJA) Chancellor
- Incumbent
- Assumed office June 1, 2009
- Preceded by: Ameurfina Melencio-Herrera

Member of the Philippine Constitutional Commission
- In office June 2, 1986 – October 15, 1986
- President: Corazon Aquino

Personal details
- Born: February 16, 1939 (age 87) Katipunan, Zamboanga del Norte, Commonwealth of the Philippines
- Spouse: Maria Asuncion Aunario
- Education: Ateneo de Manila Law School

Adolfo Sevilla Azcuna (born February 16, 1939) is a Filipino jurist who was one of the framers of the 1987 Constitution being a member of the 1986 Constitutional Commission, and served as an Associate Justice of the Supreme Court of the Philippines from 2002 to 2009. He was appointed to the Court by President Gloria Macapagal Arroyo on October 24, 2002. As of November 2019 he was the Chancellor of the Philippine Judicial Academy (PHILJA), having been appointed to that position by the Supreme Court of the Philippines on June 1, 2009. The Court granted the title of "Chancellor Emeritus" upon Azcuna who served until May 31, 2021. He was succeeded by Arturo Brion who served for 2 years and was replaced by Rosmari Carandang as the fourth Chancellor who took her oath on February 23, 2022.

== Profile ==
Azcuna received the degree of Bachelor of Arts, with academic honors, at the Ateneo de Manila in 1959 and the degree of Bachelor of Laws, cum laude, at the same institution in 1962. He was admitted to the Philippine Bar in 1963, placing 4th in the 1962 bar examinations. He forthwith embarked on a government career as assistant private secretary of then Presiding Justice Jose P. Bengzon of the Court of Appeals in 1963 and, thereafter, upon the appointment of the latter to the Supreme Court in 1964, as his private secretary.

Justice Azcuna taught International Law at his alma mater, Ateneo de Manila, from 1967 to 1986. In 1982, he completed post-graduate studies in International Law and Jurisprudence at the Salzburg University in Austria.

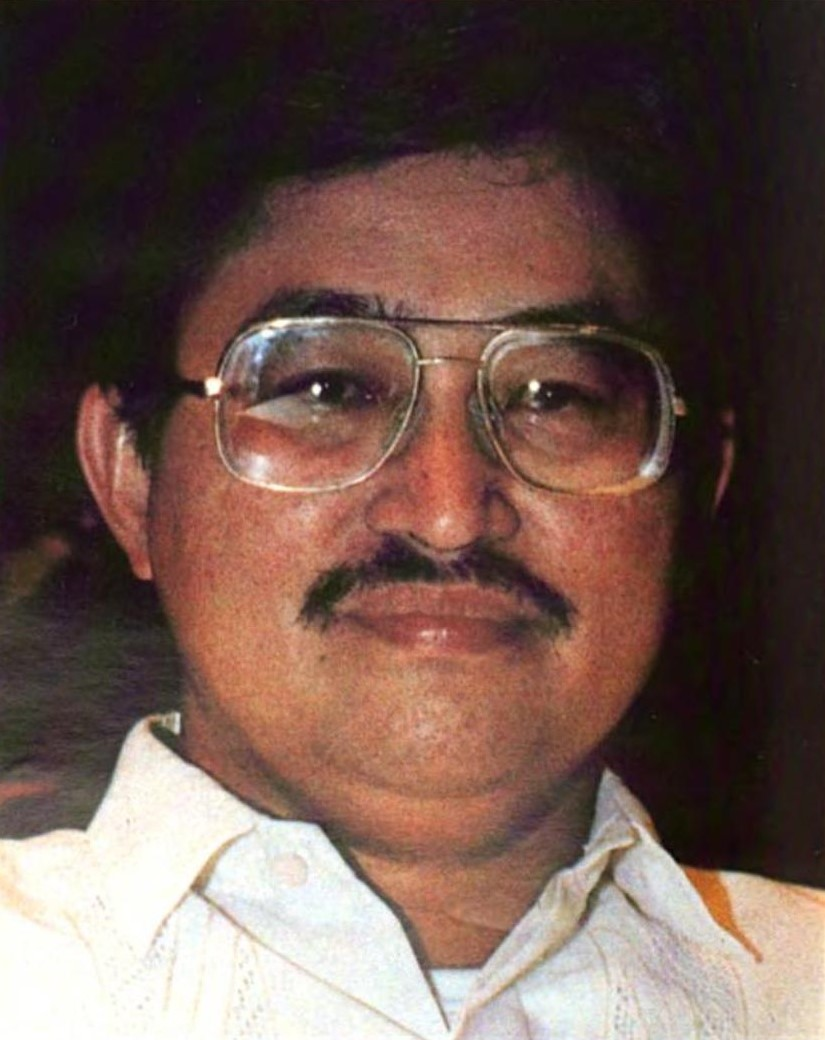
Azcuna from the Official Directory of the Constitutional Commission, c. 1986

Representing Zamboanga del Norte, he was elected as member of the 1971 Constitutional Convention. Subsequently, he was appointed as a member of the 1986 Constitutional Commission. He held several government posts during the term of President Corazon Aquino, first as Presidential Legal Counsel, then as Press Secretary and subsequently as Presidential spokesperson. In 1991, he was appointed chair of the Philippine National Bank. On October 17, 2002, he was appointed Associate Justice of the Supreme Court by President Gloria Macapagal Arroyo.

In 2007, Justice Azcuna was conferred the Metrobank Foundation Professorial Chair in International and Human Rights Law for which he delivered a presentation entitled, "International Humanitarian Law: A Field Guide to the Basics".

Justice Azcuna delivered a presentation entitled, "The Writ of Amparo: The Philippine Experience So Far", as the first recipient of the Founding Chancellor Emeritus Justice Ameurfina Melencio-Herrera Award for the Most Outstanding Professorial Lecturer.

On January 8, 2013, the Junior Chamber International (JCI) Senate Philippines and the Insular Life Assurance Co., Ltd. conferred to Justice Azcuna The Outstanding Filipino (TOFIL) Award for 2012 in the field of Justice/Law.

As a holder of the Chief Justice Artemio V. Panganiban Professorial Chair on Liberty and Prosperity, Justice Azcuna delivered a presentation entitled, "Supreme Court Decisions on the Economic Provisions of the Constitution" on April 18, 2013, at the Ateneo School of Law.

The International Commission of Jurists (ICJ) has elected Justice Azcuna as one of its five new commissioners for a term of five years from August 12, 2014, to August 11, 2019. The ICJ is dedicated to ensuring respect for international human rights standards through the law. Commissioners are known for their experience, knowledge and fundamental commitment to human rights.

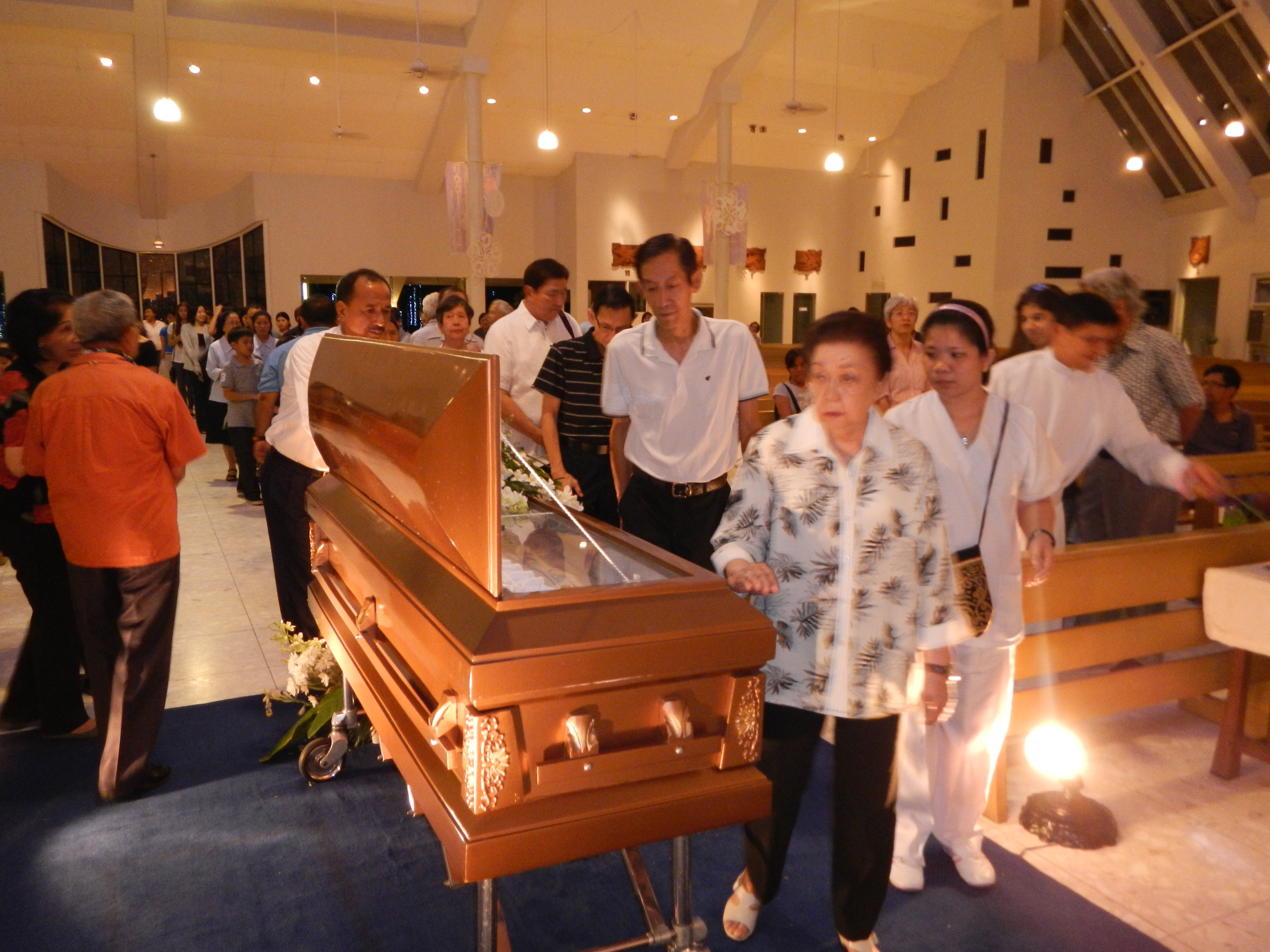
Icon of piety, Adolfo Azcuna (4th in line, Fr. James B. Reuter, SJ's wake, Church of the Gesù (Philippines).

On September 27, 2016, the Ateneo de Manila University during its 2016 Traditional University Awards conferred with Justice Azcuna the Lux-in-Domino Award. This capstone award that requires "the crowning achievement of both life and work is given to an extraordinary individual who has incarnated in life, and perhaps even in death, in an outstanding and exemplary manner, the noblest ideals of the Ateneo de Manila University". The citation stated: "For living as a selfless public servant who puts country before self and as a man of deep faith whose devotion to his family is unchanging; for devoting more than 50 years of his life to judicial work, driven by a commitment to the delivery of justice; for ensuring the protection of every Filipino's constitutional right to life, liberty, and security through the writ of amparo; for lighting a path of excellence, service, and probity that young Filipinos and Ateneans may follow."

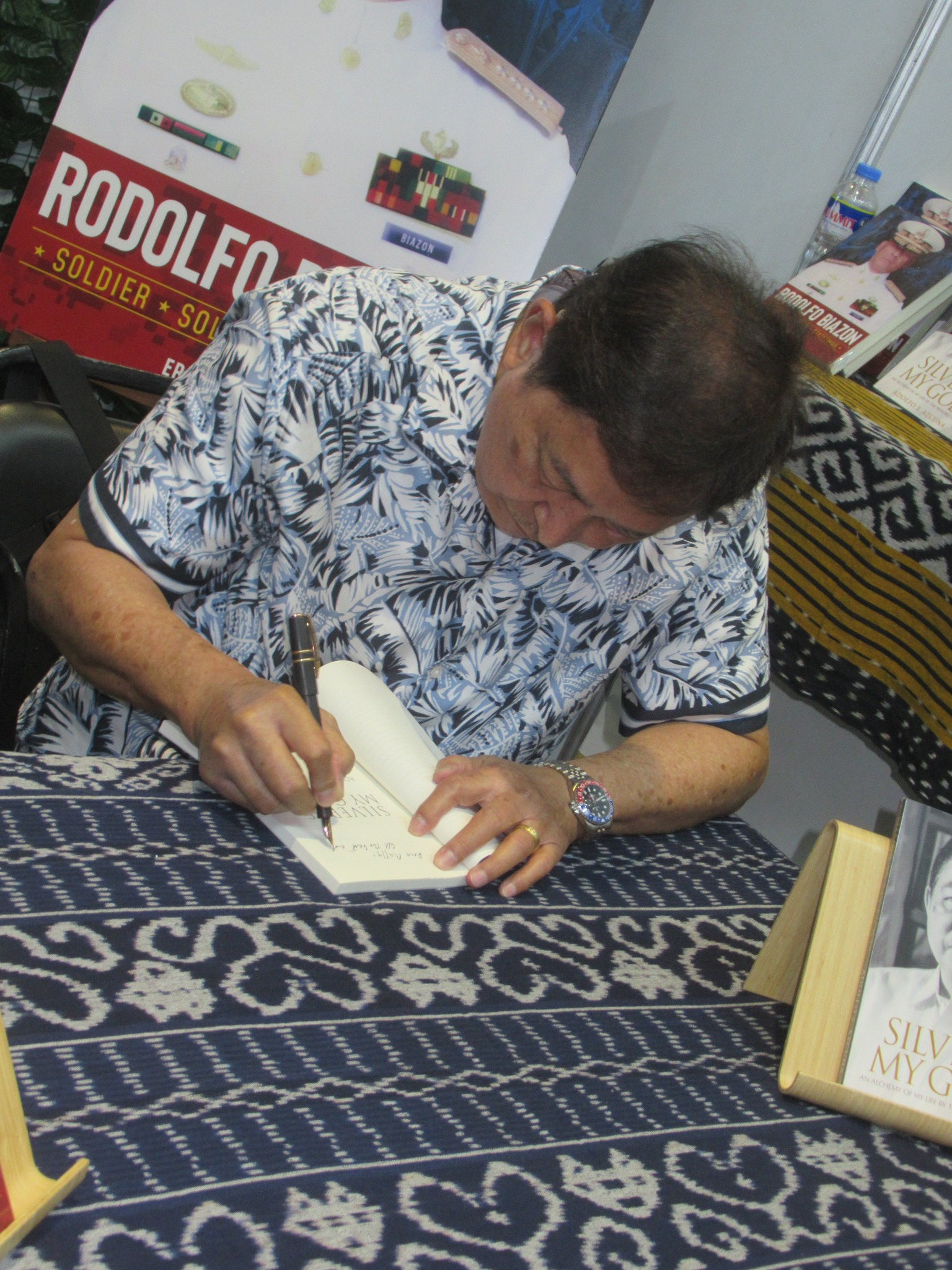
Silver is My Gold: An Alchemy of My Life by the Principle of Magis

In November 2017, Justice Azcuna was elected as a new member of the International Organization for Judicial Training (IOJT) Board of Executives at the General Assembly held during the 8th IOJT Conference on the Training of the Judiciary. PHILJA hosted the 2017 Conference, being one of IOJT's founding members.

Justice Azcuna's major publications include “International Sales of Goods,” “Transnational Law Practice,” “International Law Teaching in the Philippines,” “Doing Business in the Philippines,” “Foreign Judgment [Monetary] Enforcements in the Philippines,” “Piercing the Veil of Corporate Entity: From Willets to Santos,” “ASEAN Conflict of Law,” and “The Supreme Court and Public International Law.”

Azcuna's book entitled Silver Is My Gold: An Alchemy of My Life by the Principle of Magis was launched on June 3, 2023, at One Rockwell and at the Philippine Book Festival at the World Trade Center Metro Manila on June 4, 2023.

== Gregory Santos Ong case ==
Since the creation of the Philippine Supreme Court in 1901, no presidential appointment of a Supreme Court Associate had ever been nullified by the High Tribunal. But on July 3, 2007, Azcuna's judgment made history. The Court granted the petition of two foundations that sought to block Gregory S. Ong’s appointment over the citizenship issue. Azcuna wrote that Ong would be unable to join them on the bench "until he had proven in court that he was a natural-born Filipino citizen and corrected the records of his birth and citizenship". The court declared its decision to be final and effective immediately.

== Some notable opinions ==
- Republic of Indonesia v. Vinzon (2003) — on a foreign state's immunity from suit
- Tecson v. COMELEC (2004) – Separate Opinion — on the nationality of presidential candidate Fernando Poe, Jr.
- MWSS v. Hon. Daway (2004) — on corporate rehabilitation of MWSS
- Chavez v. COMELEC (2004) — on scope of advertisement ban covering candidates for senatorial candidates
- Abello v. CIR (2005) — on taxability of political contributions for donor's tax
- ABAKADA v. Ermita (2005) – Concurring and Dissenting — on constitutionality of 2005 Expanded Value Added Tax Law
- BAYAN v. Ermita (2006) — on constitutionality of rally permit requirement and policy of calibrated preemptive response
- Lambino v. COMELEC (2006) – Separate Opinion — on people's initiative as a mode to amend the Constitution

Political offices
Preceded by Ameurfina Melencio-Herrera	PHILJA Chancellor; June 2009– present	Succeeded by Incumbent
Legal offices
Preceded by Santiago M. Kapunan	Associate Justice of the Supreme Court of the Philippines; October 24, 2002 – February 15, 2009	Succeeded by Lucas P. Bersamin
