= Stonehill scandal =

Bribery scandal in the Philippines

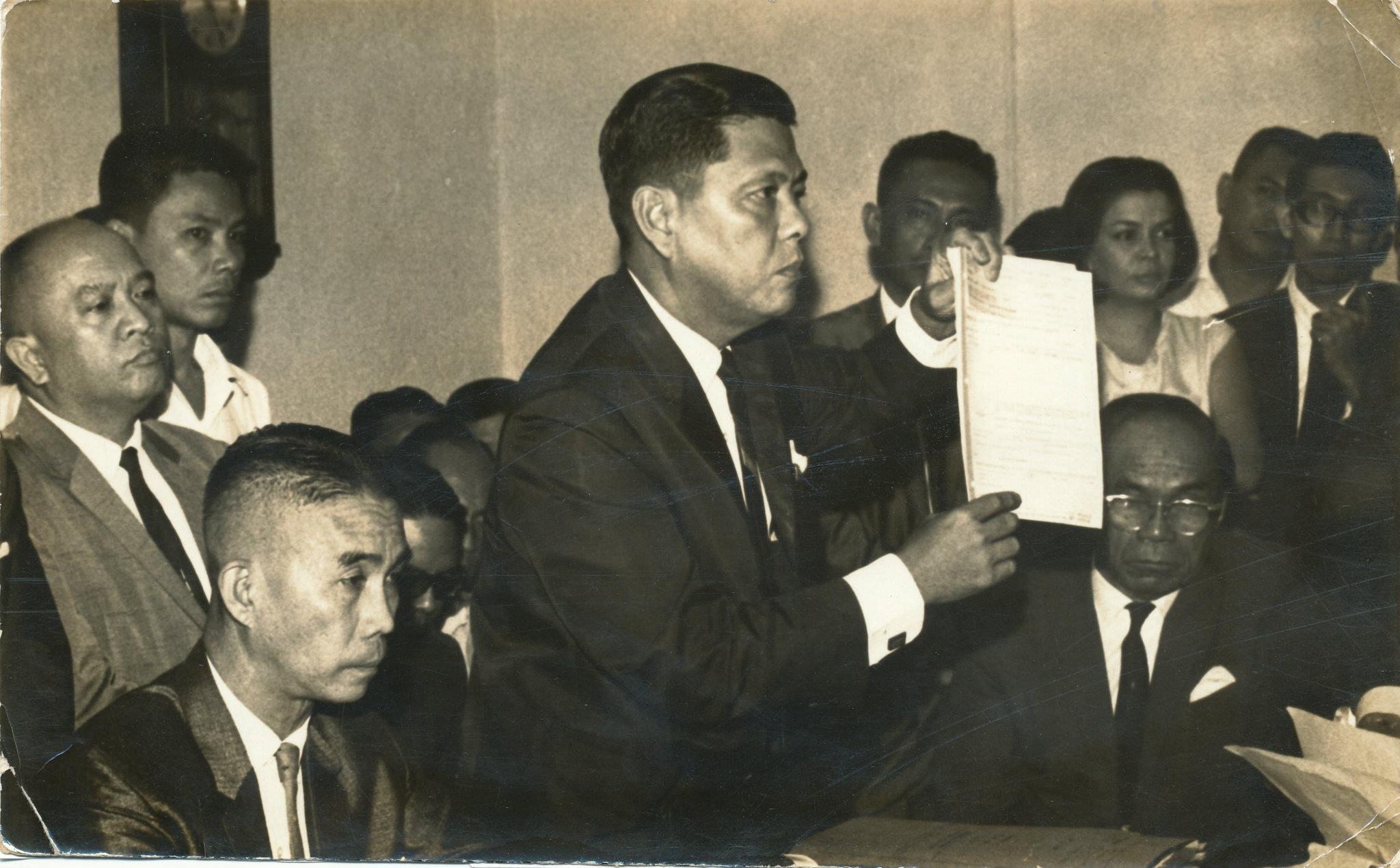
José W. Diokno, the Secretary of Justice

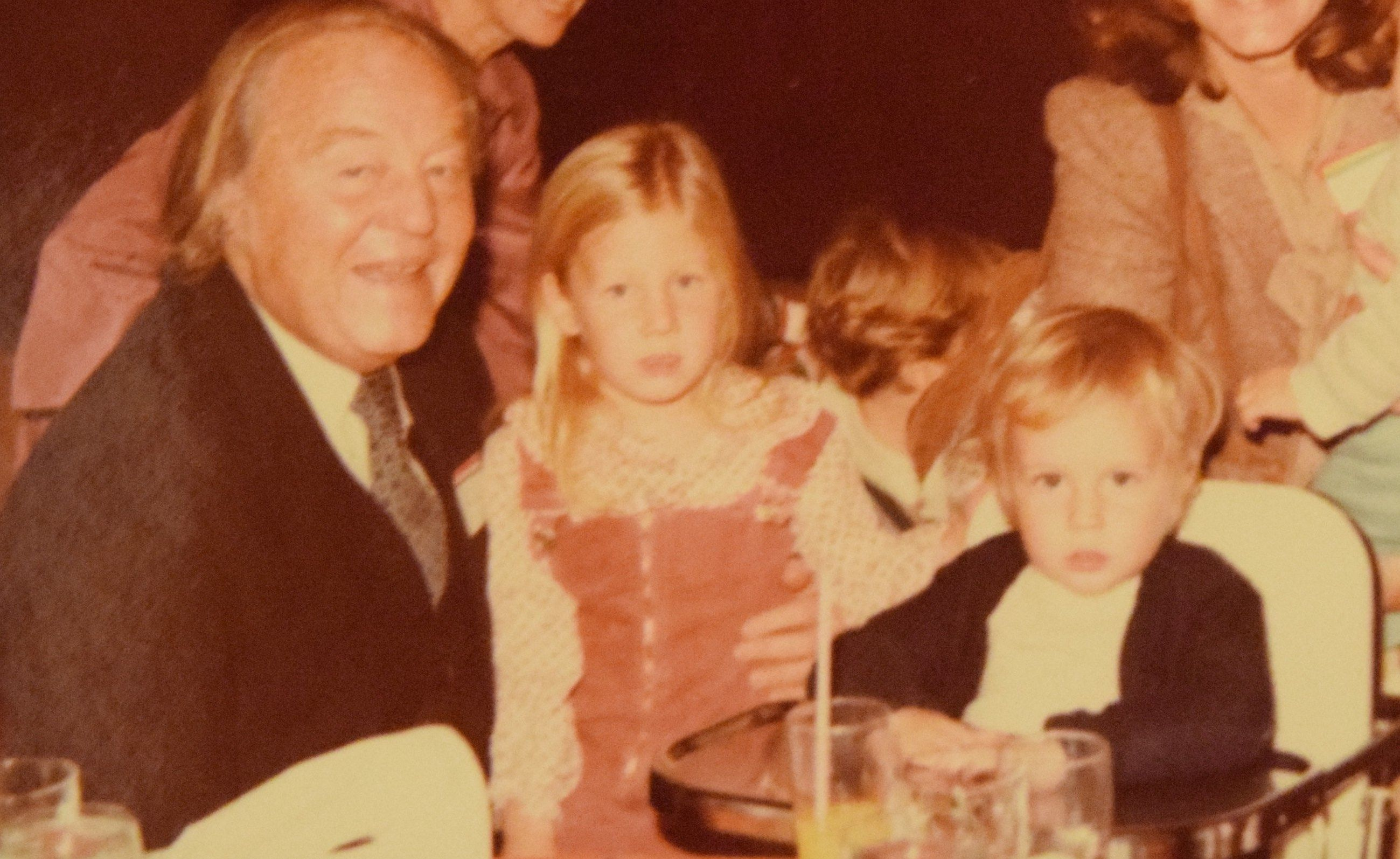
Harry Stonehill, who owned a blue book that listed bribed officials from Pres. Macapagal to Ferdinand Marcos

The Stonehill scandal, named after American expatriate businessman Harry Stonehill, was a 1962 bribery scandal in the Philippines which implicated high level government officials, including President Diosdado Macapagal, future President Ferdinand Marcos, former President Carlos P. Garcia, and numerous other top Philippine officials, who were accused of accepting bribes to protect Stonehill's $50-million business empire, which included a monopoly on tobacco and other exploited crops and popular local resources.

The scandal erupted when José W. Diokno, who was serving as Justice Secretary under the Macapagal administration at the time, raided the offices of 42 of Stonehill's business establishments on March 2, 1962, and arrested Stonehill along with a number of his associates. The raid resulted in the confiscation of phone-tapping instruments, jamming devices, and other espionage equipment, as well as six army trucks' worth of documents. Stonehill was accused of tax evasion, economic sabotage, and various other charges; but among the documents were a letter from Stonehill addressed to Macapagal and a "blue book" which listed money given to various government officials, including Macapagal, Garcia, and Marcos. It is considered the first exposed corruption scandal to reach the headlines and become widely publicized, and paved the way for Senate inquiries or cases on plunder, bribery, and graft and corruption.

Macapagal, father of the 14th president Gloria Macapagal Arroyo, ordered Stonehill to be deported in August 1962, which sparked outrage and accusations of a coverup, notably from Diokno, whom Macapagal had prevented from pursuing the prosecution and then sacked from the cabinet via an "official acceptance of his resignation". Diokno, in lamenting Macapagal's order to deport Stonehill, said, "How can the government now prosecute the corrupted when it has allowed the corrupter to go?" Some friends of Macapagal even sent death threats to Diokno, prompting Manila Mayor Arsenio Lacson to offer him special protection. Diokno only learned of his resignation through newspapers while he was out of town, further angering citizens.

The scandal reportedly cost Macapagal his presidency, where he lost to another friend bribed by Stonehill, Ferdinand Marcos, during the 1965 Philippine presidential election. Due to the poor approval ratings of President Macapagal, Marcos saw an opportunity to run against Macapagal, his own partymate in the Liberal Party and jumped ship to the opposing Nacionalista Party. He would later cancel both parties in 1972 when he became a dictator through martial law until he was ousted in 1986.

Diokno would run for senator the next year and easily win at the 1963 Senate elections, joining the opposing Nacionalista Party (as his father the late Sen. Ramón Diokno was from the same party during his term). Economic historians also note that it helped fuel a brand of economic nationalism which resulted in policies that partly slowed the growth of the Philippine market economy but ultimately benefited society by strengthening the resolve of the people.

== Stonehill v. Diokno ==
Stonehill v. Diokno
- Court: Supreme Court of the Philippines en banc
Full case name
Harry S. Stonehill, Robert P. Brooks, John J. Brooks and Karl Beck, petitioners, vs. Hon. José W. Diokno, in his capacity as Secretary of Justice; Jose Lukban, in his capacity as Acting Director, National Bureau of Investigation; Special prosecutors Pedro D. Cenzon, Efren I. Plana and Manuel Villareal, Jr. and Asst. Fiscal Manases G. Reyes; Judge Amado Roan, Municipal Court of Manila; Judge Roman Cansino, Municipal Court of Manila; Judge Hermogenes Caluag, Court of First Instance of Rizal-Quezon City Branch, and Judge Damian Jimenez, Municipal Court of Quezon City, respondents.
- Decided: June 29, 1962 (preliminary judgment); June 19, 1967
- Citation: G.R. No. L-19550 (20 S.C.R.A. 383)

Case history
- Appealed from: Quezon City Court of First Instance of Rizal Quezon City Branch: Stonehill v. Diokno
- Ponente: Alejo Labrador (preliminary en banc judgment); Roberto Concepcion

Court membership
- Judges sitting: César Bengzon (Chief Justice), Alejo Labrador, Roberto Concepcion, JBL Reyes, Jose Ma. Paredes, Sabino B. Padilla, Felix Angelo Bautista, Jesus G. Barrera, Arsenio Dizon, Querube Makalintal (for the preliminary judgment); Roberto Concepcion (Chief Justice), Fred Ruiz Castro, JBL Reyes, Arsenio Dizon, Querube Makalintal, Jose P. Bengzon, Calixto Zaldivar, Conrado V. Sanchez, Roberto Regala (for the second case)
- Majority: Labrador, joined by Bengzon, Concepcion, Padilla, Angelo Bautista, Barrera, Dizon, Regala, Makalintal (1962 participants)
- Majority: Concepcion, joined by Reyes, Dizon, Makalintal, Bengzon, Zaldivar, Sanchez
- Concurrence: Castro
- Dissent: also Castro
- Reyes, Paredes took no part in the consideration or decision of the case. (1962); Regala took no part in the consideration or decision of the case.

Keywords
- Paredes, Poblador, Cruz and Nazareno Firm, and Meer, Meer and Meer Firm acting as counsel for petitioners. José W. Diokno (1962), Office of the Solicitor General Arturo A. Alafriz, Assistant Solicitor General Pacifico P. de Castro, Assistant Solicitor General Frine C. Zaballero, Solicitor Camilo D. Quiason, and Solicitor C. Padua acting as counsel for respondents.

Stonehill v. Diokno, G.R. No. L-19550, 20 S.C.R.A. 383 (1967), is a landmark decision of the Supreme Court of the Philippines recognizing the doctrine of the fruit of the poisonous tree on the admissibility of evidence especially against politicians or political cronies in the Philippine legal system. The case is the first major instance that led to the development of cases on corruption scandals.

== Background ==
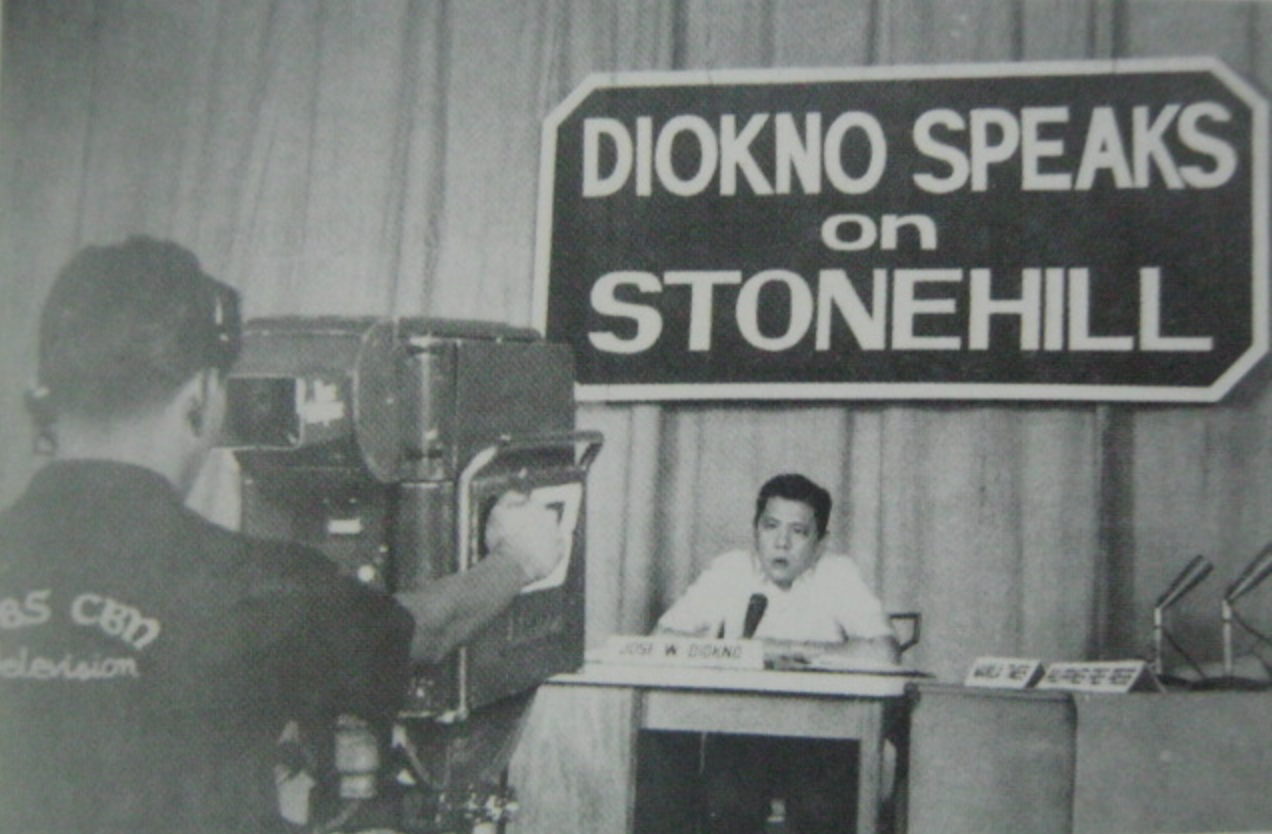
Diokno, who counseled himself, during the Stonehill pre-trial conference

Harry Steinberg, a Polish-American war veteran who went by the Anglicized surname Stonehill was in charge of a 50 million US dollar empire, which involved bribed officials and monopolies on different industries from tobacco including the top brand, "Puppies", to cement and glassware. At first, a congressional hearing was convened and brought Stonehill to bear on tax evasion charges, which Stonehill managed to evade until the search and seizure in contention occurred at his office.

Secretary José W. Diokno was recently appointed in late 1961 as Secretary of Justice and officially began his term on January 2, 1962, after his predecessor was removed from office in December as a result of Macapagal cancelling midnight appointments by former President Carlos P. Garcia. Diokno showed in his first day that he was immediately ready to file cases involving graft and corruption and quickly filed on his first day in office on January 2, Tuesday. They quickly built a strong working relationship, and Diokno even recommended to Macapagal how he would deal with the remaining midnight appointees, to which Macapagal positively responded by deeming them all legally ousted from office effective immediately.

Meinhart Spielman, general manager of Stonehill's Philippine Tobacco Corporation, broke the gridlock of the hearings by filing a case for frustrated murder against Stonehill and Robert Brooks. Spielman demanded his unpaid compensation and suffered multiple injuries from Stonehill himself. Spielman, fearing for his life, shared information of a certain "blue book" that could serve as crucial evidence in the hearing and in potential charges. Secretary Diokno acted on this clue and, with the aid of the National Bureau of Investigation (NBI), ordered a search and seizure in March 1962 while arresting Stonehill and Brooks on Saturday, March 3.

Diokno's appointment was a result of his close friend, Manila Mayor Arsenio Lacson, giving a prerequisite to Macapagal that the mayor would support his candidacy for president; provided, that he appointed Diokno as Secretary of Justice. Diokno then proceeded to go on arrests and issue search warrants until he learned in March 1962 of Stonehill and of his "blue book" that might contain names of most politicians, signifying that all were under Stonehill's control and payroll. Some including President Macapagal himself, received up to three million pesos in 1961, among the two hundred listed names of politicians in the blue book.

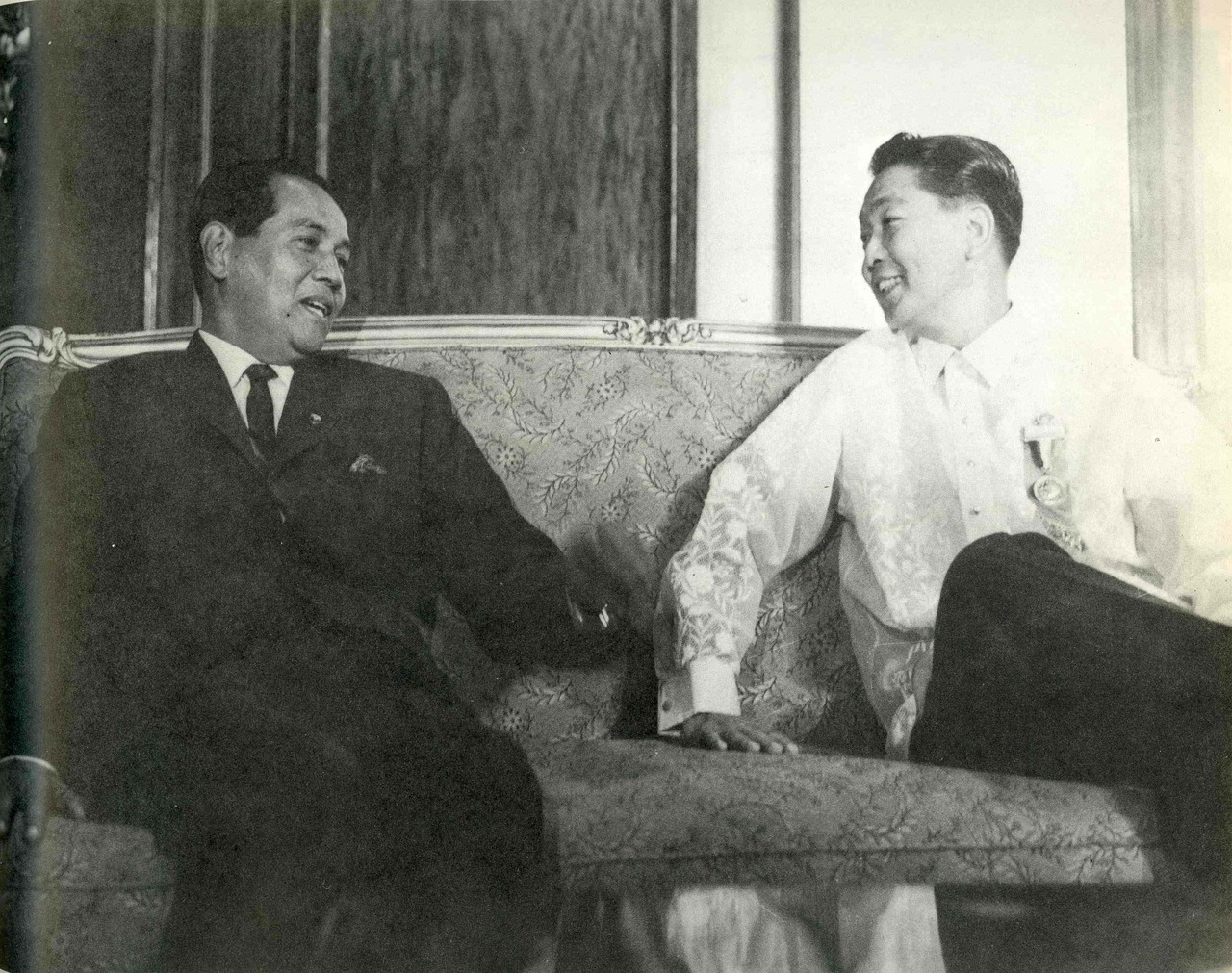
Two of the three presidents involved (Garcia was the other), Pres. Macapagal and Sen. Marcos

After Diokno was removed from office and Stonehill deported, the "blue book" went missing. The case was ruled in June 1962 at the Supreme Court and a preliminary injunction was issued against Diokno and others from using the evidence taken from the office of U.S. Tobacco Corporation at the Ledesma Building (along Arzobispo St., Manila), the Army and Navy Club, and multiple other offices, as well as the residences of those working with the accused Stonehill. The injunction was first issued by the Court on March 22, 1962, but was partially lifted only for those materials taken from offices and not residences.

It would not be until 1967 that the case would be reopened and this time ruled with finality on the usage of the seized materials sans the blue book as evidence for investigation. In the final decision penned by Chief Justice Roberto Concepcion, the seized items, including ledgers, typewriters, Bobbins cigarette wrappers, balance sheets, and all pertinent evidence were divided into two categories: (1) those seized in offices and (2) those seized in residences. The ponente wrote that the first group was based on a valid search warrant. Citing Remus vs. United States (C.C.A.)291 F. 501, 511 and other American jurisprudence, companies and corporations have their own distinct juridical personality. This means that they may become parties to a lawsuit as their assets and liabilities are considered separate from private citizens. Thus the rights granted to the privacy of citizens are of different standards from corporations. The injunction that was issued on evidence taken from private residences became the main issue in contention.

== Doctrine of the fruit of the poisonous tree ==
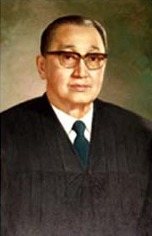
Chief Justice Roberto Concepcion, who wrote the ponencia

According to Chief Justice Concepcion, the constitutional basis for search warrants in private residences are: (1) that they may only be granted by the Courts if probable cause is determined and that (2) the warrant shall particularly describe the things to be seized. This can be found in the Bill of Rights of the 1935 Constitution, or in Article III, Section 1(3) which states,

(3) The right of the people to be secure in their persons, houses, papers, and effects against unreasonable searches and seizures shall not be violated, and no warrants shall issue but upon probable cause, to be determined by the judge after examination under oath or affirmation of the complainant and the witnesses he may produce, and particularly describing the place to be searched, and the persons or things to be seized.

This is reiterated in the far lengthier prevailing 1987 Constitution, which emphasized that the term "search and seizures" were of any nature or type, as well as the personal involvement of the judge as a result of this case.

SECTION 2. The right of the people to be secure in their persons, houses, papers, and effects against unreasonable searches and seizures of whatever nature and for any purpose shall be inviolable, and no search warrant or warrant of arrest shall issue except upon probable cause to be determined personally by the judge after examination under oath or affirmation of the complainant and the witnesses he may produce, and particularly describing the place to be searched and the persons or things to be seized.

Since this was not determined through probable cause, it was not admissible evidence. The Court abandoned the doctrine set in Moncado vs. People's Court (80 Phil. 1) that unconstitutionally obtained evidence may still be admissible. This was because the protection of the right to privacy may be violated, which is the essence of the exclusionary rule or the doctrine of the fruit of the poisonous tree. This was the origin of the exclusionary rule. The term, fruit of the poisonous tree was not expressly mentioned, C.J. Concepcion used the term exclusionary rule, and the rule was the basis of the law of this case, which meant that evidence that is unconstitutional cannot be used to investigate or prosecute another party. Essentially the rule also ensured that general warrants or scatter-shot warrants cannot be issued to allow law officers to go on fishing expeditions and obtain evidence against the accused, as this is the only practical means to enforce the constitutional injunction against unreasonable searches and seizures in the Bill of Rights found in Article III of both the contemporary and modern constitutions.

== Aftermath ==
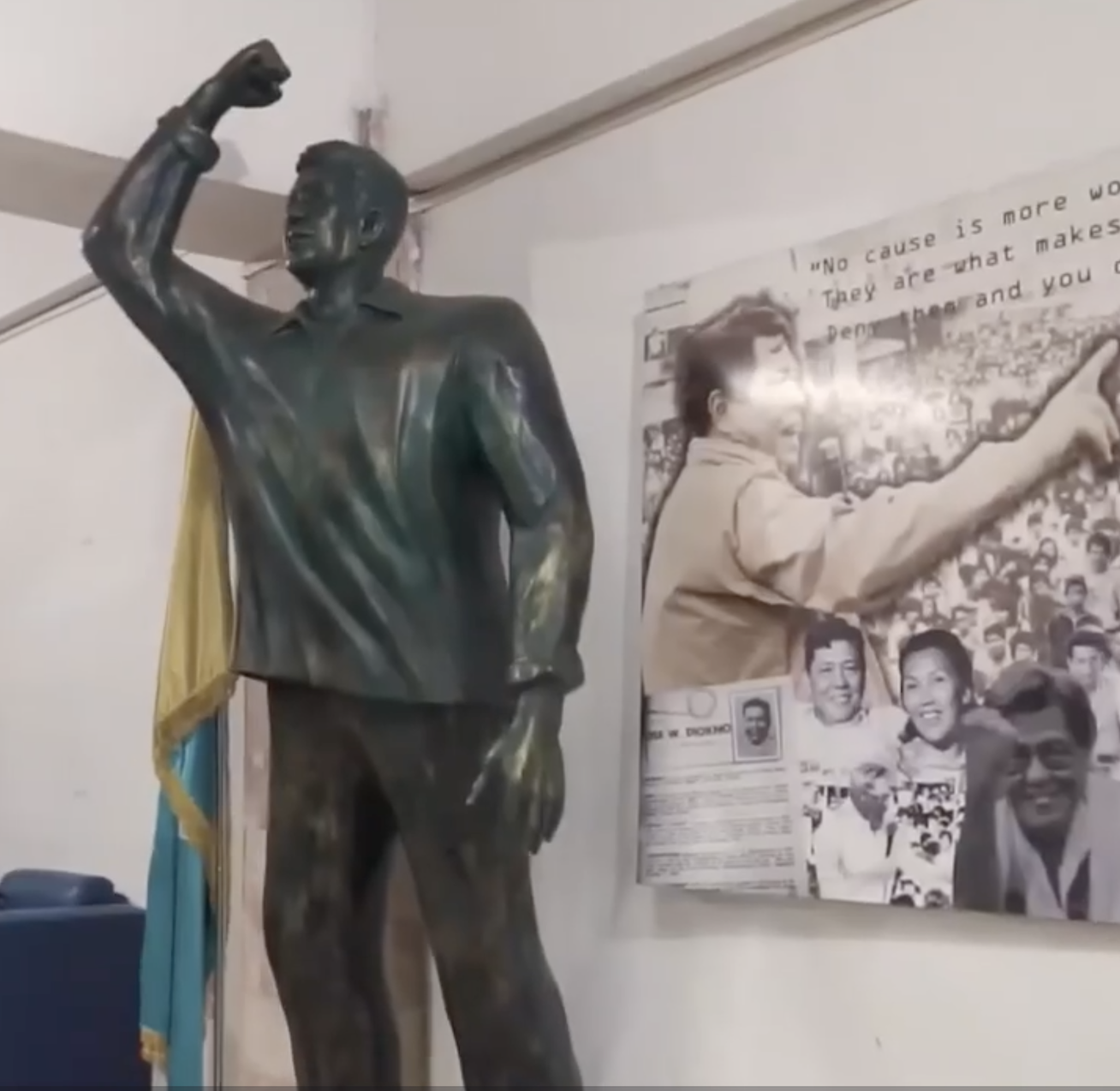
José W. Diokno at the Bulwagang Ka Pepe, CHR Central Office

Without the blue book, Diokno's pleadings and evidence were almost moot as the blue book carried incriminatory and conclusive evidence against the 200 politicians under Stonehill's set of accounts. Senator Jovito Salonga once remarked that though Stonehill was deported by Macapagal, he nor any of the politicians involved can ever be able to deport the truth. With Macapagal deporting Stonehill, Diokno quickly ran the succeeding year as senator of the opposition Nacionalista Party, garnering about half of the popular votes as Macapagal's approval ratings plunged. Stonehill and his men were deported to the United States and Stonehill returned to his native Chicago. The fate of Meinhart Spielman is unknown, as he mysteriously disappeared around the time of Stonehill's deportation. Both he and Brooks faced tax evasion charges as well in their native homeland, which led to an appeal in the United States Court of Appeals, whose decision was penned by Judge William A. Fletcher, and so they began a series of migrations as fugitives from the law. Stonehill and his disarrayed family met deportations issued by Canada and Mexico.

Eventually he brought four children from his second family with his Filipino partner Lourdes Blanco to different states. He first settled in Japan, then moved his family to the UK, Brazil, and Switzerland before finally settling in Spain. During this excursion, he returned to home soil in 1987, one year after the People Power Revolution that ousted President Marcos, subtly revisiting the country in order to seek out his assets but was quickly made to leave, gaining nothing in his short visit. Stonehill eventually died in Málaga, Spain in March 2002, at the age of 84, long after the lifetimes of Senator Diokno, Presidents Macapagal and Marcos, and many other parties involved.

== Legacy ==
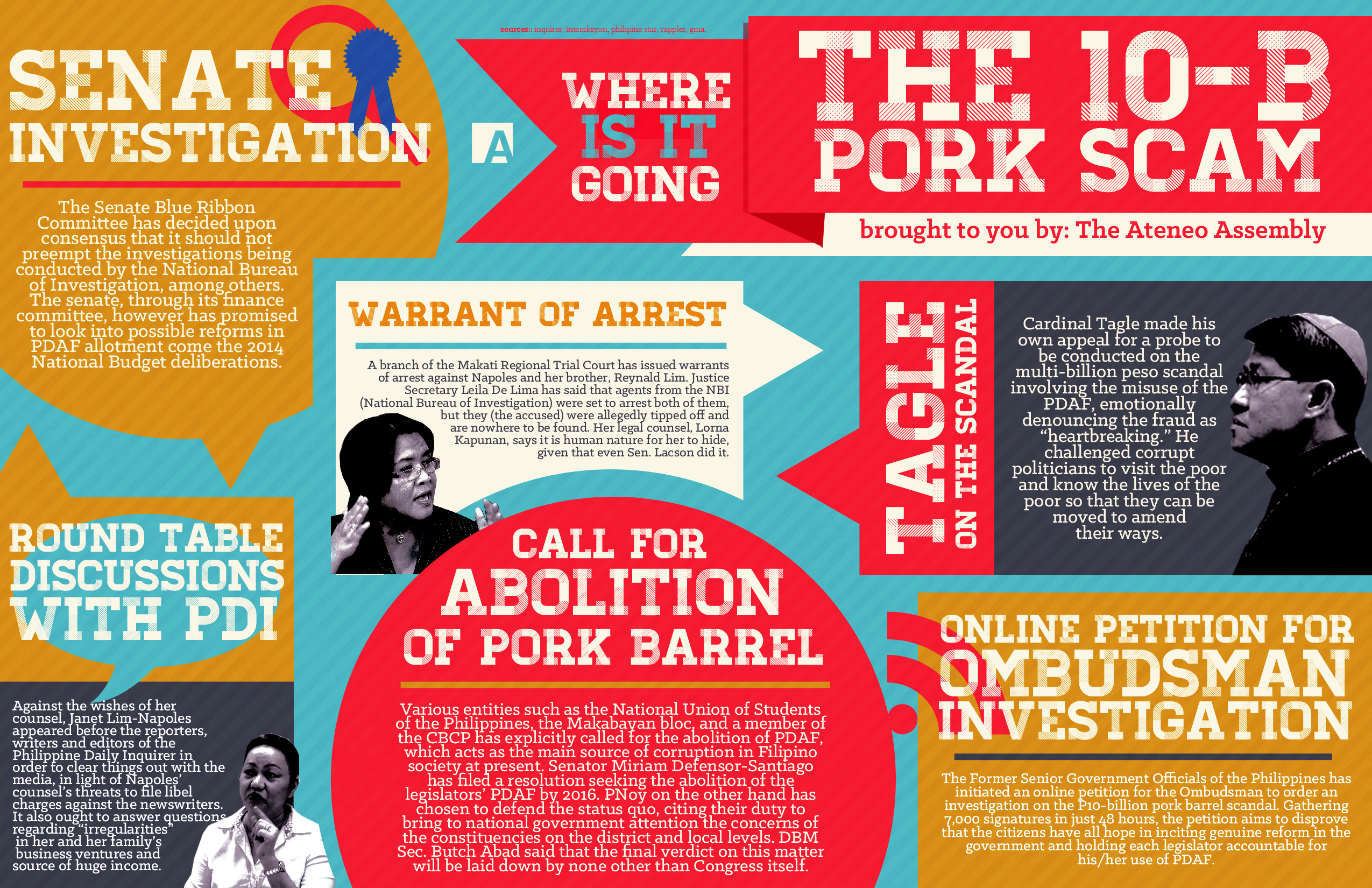
The PDAF scam, a similar scandal that mirrored Stonehill's scandal

The scandal and its ensuing litigation hearings popularized the concept of congressional hearings or senate investigations in aid of inquiry and not merely question hours, as well as litigation cases with the Sandiganbayan or Supreme Court as a common resort to major political scandals. The case has become a metaphor for presidents who choose to hide pieces of evidence in corruption allegations that may implicate them, and has become a frequent model for comparison in political analysis on corruption scandals, such as in the Pharmally inquiry involving convicted ex-President Rodrigo Duterte, and the PDAF or Pork barrel scam of Janet Napoles. The common comparison usually surrounds the question whether the President may block evidence or ban the appearance of those complicit. For instance, the President may insist the Congressional inquiries are for question hour only to determine legal violations and not in aid of legislation, which grants the privilege to be excused from answering for investigations. On the other hand, the office of the President may decide to be accountable and allow the attendance of its subordinates and associates.

The ruling has also been invoked in subsequent impeachment proceedings as an illustration of the constitutional limits on anti-corruption prosecutions.

- During the 2012 impeachment trial of Chief Justice Renato Corona, the defense cited Stonehill v. Diokno to argue that the government's anti-corruption campaign could not justify violations of constitutional rights, comparing the actions of the Aquino administration to the Stonehill investigation.
- The case was also raised again during the 2026 impeachment trial of Vice President Sara Duterte, where senator-judges Alan Peter Cayetano and Pia Cayetano cited it in questioning prosecutor Rep. Chel Diokno (the son of Jose W. Diokno) over the scope of subpoenas for financial records. The defense argued that the subpoenas amounted to a "fishing expedition" and were indicative of an unfair prosecution, while Diokno distinguished that Stonehill involved unconstitutional search warrants rather than subpoenas, which are governed by different legal standards.

Although Stonehill may have lost possession of his 50 million dollar empire, which included at least 18 known companies, some of the effects of his ventures include the casinos and establishments along Pasay City, which takes a huge section of what is called Bay City attached to Manila and facing Manila Bay. This reclamation area started out of ventures that were initially planned by Stonehill. As of the present, the highway along Bay City that directly faces Manila Bay has been renamed to José W. Diokno Boulevard, which is parallel to Macapagal Boulevard. Both serve as the main avenues in this reclamation area.

== See also ==
- List of political scandals in the Philippines
- Department of Justice
- José W. Diokno
