= Leonardo Quisumbing =

Filipino judge (1939–2019)

The Honorable Leonardo A. Quisumbing

33rd Senior Associate Justice of the Supreme Court of the Philippines
- In office December 7, 2006 – November 6, 2009
- Preceded by: Reynato S. Puno
- Succeeded by: Antonio Carpio

140th Associate Justice of the Supreme Court of the Philippines
- In office January 15, 1998 – November 6, 2009
- Appointed by: Fidel Ramos
- Preceded by: Justo P. Torres, Jr.
- Succeeded by: Jose Perez

Secretary of Labor and Employment
- In office January 16, 1996 – January 14, 1998
- Appointed by: Fidel Ramos
- Preceded by: Jose S. Brillantes
- Succeeded by: Bienvenido E. Laguesma

Personal details
- Born: November 6, 1939 Masbate, Masbate, Commonwealth of the Philippines
- Died: January 20, 2019 (aged 79) Manila, Philippines
- Spouse: Purificacion C. Valera
- Children: 2
- Education: Manuel L. Quezon University (AB); University of the Philippines College of Law (LL.B); Cornell Law School (LL.M)

Leonardo A. Quisumbing (November 6, 1939 – January 20, 2019) was an Associate Justice of the Supreme Court of the Philippines. He was appointed by President Fidel Ramos in 1998 and retired as the most senior Associate Justice of the Court on his 70th birthday in 2009.

== Profile ==
Hailing from Masbate City, Masbate, Quisumbing graduated valedictorian from the Masbate High School in 1955. He was a prominent campus figure as an undergraduate student at the Manuel L. Quezon University, where he edited The Quezonian. He graduated magna cum laude with a degree in A.B. Journalism.

After graduating, he enrolled at the U.P. College of Law where he became a member of the Alpha Phi Beta Fraternity. While at U.P., he was the president of the University Student Council, the president of the Student Councils Association of the Philippines, and an editor of the Philippine Collegian. He earned his law degree in 1966. He placed 12th in the bar examinations in the same year and he pursued his post-graduate studies at Cornell Law School, obtaining a Master of Laws degree. He was also an NEC-AID Scholarship grantee. Quisumbing was a member of the National Debating Team to Australia that won the Wilmot Cup. On a Fulbright Youth Leader grant, he visited Harvard University, Columbia University, Georgetown University, and other universities. He was also a delegate to the 11th International Student Conference in 1965 at Christchurch, New Zealand.

Quisumbing became a technical assistant to Executive Secretary Rafael Salas in 1965, and then became an assistant state counsel at the Department of Justice from 1966 to 1968. After a stint in private practice from 1968 to 1983, he joined the administration of President Corazon Aquino as senior executive assistant to the defense minister in 1986 and Undersecretary for the Department of National Defense in 1987. In 1992, he ran for senator under the Lakas-NUCD but lost. During the administration of Fidel Ramos, he would first serve as Senior Deputy Executive Secretary in 1993, then, acting executive secretary in 1994. He also became the officer-in-charge of the Office of the Executive Secretary in September 1995, before being appointed as Secretary of the Department of Labor and Employment from 1996 to January 1998. It was from the DOLE that he was appointed to the Supreme Court on January 27, 1998, by Ramos. Before his present appointment, he also held the rank of Commodore of the Philippine Coast Guard, 106th Auxiliary Squadron.

He was a lecturer of the Philippine College of Commerce (now Polytechnic University of the Philippines) and the U.P. College of Law from 1977 to 1989. He also served briefly as dean at Northwestern University in Laoag City. For his academic and government service, he received the Presidential Order of Merit award, a Ph.D. honoris causa from the University of Pangasinan and a doctorate degree in public administration from the Polytechnic University of the Philippines.

Quisumbing had special training in Management of Public Agencies at the Cornell University Graduate School, in Research at Georgetown University Communications at the Michigan State University, and in Public Sector Negotiations at Harvard University. While serving as a trade union officer, he attended international law and labor conferences in Geneva, Moscow, Beijing and Jakarta.

His published works include: Constitutional Control of the Election Process; Compensation in Land Reform Cases, Comparative Public Law Study; Asean Comparative Law (Vol. IV ed., Corporation Law) in the EEC and Asean, Two Regional Experiences; Law on Taxation in the Philippines; Labor Law and Jurisprudence (1992–1998); and Access to Justice, a lecture delivered before the 1993 Asean Law Association Conference in Singapore.

Quisumbing was married to Dr. Purificacion Valera Quisumbing, who died in December 2011, the former chairperson of the Commission on Human Rights. They had two children: Josefa Lourdes and Cecilia Rachel.

Known as an activist, Quisumbing had a long record of union service since the 1970s. He was the former chairman of the Confederation of Industry Unions of the Philippines, (CINUP), former president of the National Alliance of Teachers and Allied Workers (NATAW), and former secretary-general of the Lakas Manggagawa Labor Center (LMLC).

== Some notable opinions ==
- Cojuangco v. Sandiganbayan (1998) — on constitutional right of accused to speedy trial
- Samson v. Aguirre (1999) — on constitutionality of law creating a city of Novaliches
- Cyanamid Phil. v. CA (2000) — on taxability of improperly accumulated profits or surplus
- Tijing v. CA (2001) — on admissibility of DNA evidence
- People v. Mojello (2004) - Dissenting Opinion — on right of an accused to an independent counsel of his own choice (joined by J. Vitug and Tinga)
- MIAA v. Airspan Corp. (2004) — on authority of MIAA to increase airport rental fees
- Poe v. Macapagal-Arroyo (2005) — on dismissal of election protest against President Arroyo on account of the death of Protestant Fernando Poe, Jr.
- Republic v. Orbecido (2005) — on right to remarry of a Filipino after being divorced by a formerly-Filipino spouse who had obtained foreign citizenship
- Henares, Jr. v. LTFRB (2006) — on mandamus as a means to compel the use of compressed natural gas in jeepneys and other public utility motor vehicles
- supremecourt.gov.ph/news, PET Junks Legarda’s Poll Protest against VP De Castro

Legal offices
Preceded by Justo P. Torres, Jr.	Associate Justice of the Supreme Court of the Philippines; 1998–2009	Succeeded by Jose Perez
Preceded by Reynato Puno	Senior Associate Justice of the Supreme Court; 2006–2009	Succeeded by Antonio Carpio
