= Jose P. Perez =

Filipino supreme court judge (1946–2021)

The Honorable Jose Perez
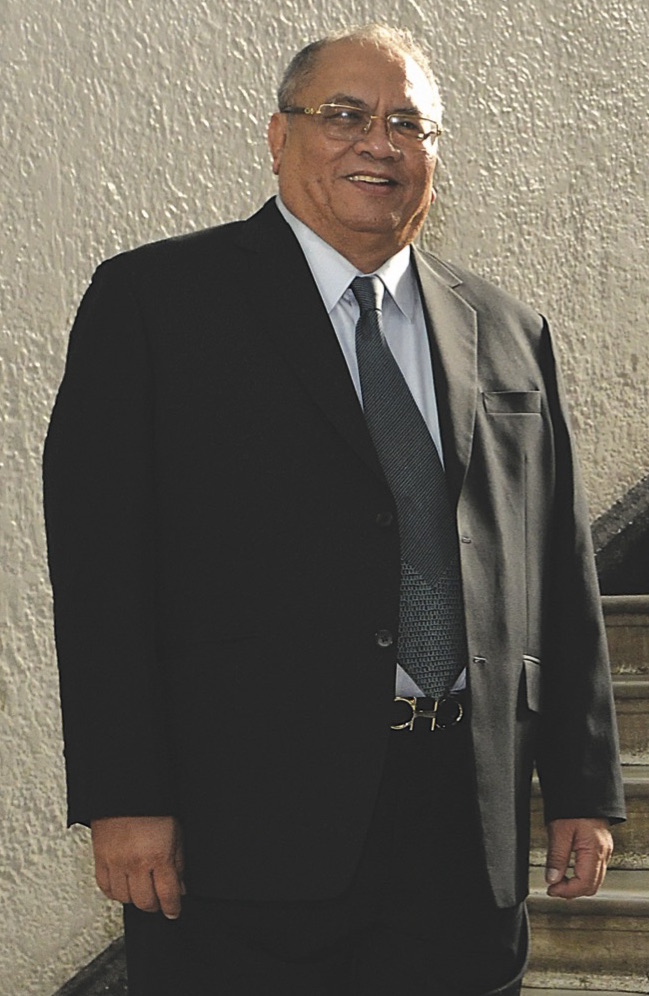

167th Associate Justice of the Supreme Court of the Philippines
- In office December 26, 2009 – December 14, 2016
- President: Gloria Macapagal Arroyo
- Preceded by: Leonardo A. Quisumbing
- Succeeded by: Samuel R. Martires

Personal details
- Born: Jose Portugal Perez; December 14, 1946 Batangas City, Philippines
- Died: August 12, 2021 (aged 74)
- Spouse: Expedita Sabile Perez
- Children: Jerico, Zernan, Donnabelle
- Education: University of the Philippines College of Law
- Occupation: Lawyer

Jose Portugal Perez (December 14, 1946 – August 12, 2021) was a Filipino lawyer who was appointed Associate Justice of the Supreme Court of the Philippines in 2009. He had served the Supreme Court of the Philippines administration from 1971, starting as technical assistant and attaining the post of court administrator in 2008. He is the only member of the bench to be appointed from the administration.

== Early life and education ==
Perez was born on December 14, 1946. His parents are Luciano G. Perez and Engracia R. Portugal, both of Ibaan, Batangas. He completed his elementary education at St. Bridget College in 1959. He then graduated as valedictorian of the Batangas City High School in 1963. He completed his Bachelor of Arts in Political Science from University of the Philippines in 1967 wherein he was one of its top 10 graduates. He was awarded Bachelor of Laws from University of the Philippines College of Law in 1971. He was accepted by the Phi Kappa Phi and Phi Gamma Mu Honor Societies as well as the university's law honor society, the Order of the Purple Feather.

== Career ==
Fresh from graduation, Perez started working at the Supreme Court of the Philippines as technical assistant in 1971. He then moved up, with appointments as legal assistant (1972–1973), judicial assistant (1974–1976) and, in 1977, a confidential attorney in the Office of Chief Justice Fred Ruiz Castro. In 1980 he was the supervising attorney in the office of the Chief Attorney where he rose to the position of Assistant Chief. In 1987 he was named a Deputy Clerk of the Court, promoted as Assistant Court Administrator in 1996 then finally as Deputy Court Administrator in 2000. He served as acting Court Administrator several times before his appointment as Court Administrator in 2008. Following the retirement of Associate Justice Leonardo A. Quisumbing on November 6, 2009, Perez was appointed by President Gloria Macapagal Arroyo as her 14th appointee to the court.

In 2012, Perez was nominated by the Asia Pacific Bar Association for appointment to the Chief Justice position vacated by Renato Corona.

== Personal life and death ==
Perez was married to Expedita Sabile and they had three children together.

Perez died on August 12, 2021, aged 74.

Legal offices
Preceded by Leonardo A. Quisumbing	Associate Justice of the Supreme Court; 2009–2016	Succeeded by Samuel Martires
