= Philippine habeas corpus cases =

Philippine habeas corpus cases are cases decided by the Supreme Court of the Philippines, which invoke the writ of habeas corpus.

The writ of habeas corpus may be suspended in order to prevent any violence in cases of rebellion or insurrection, as the case may be. In Philippine jurisdiction, the present 1987 Philippine Constitution, Article III, Section 15 provides that "The privilege of the writ of habeas corpus shall not be suspended except in cases of invasion or rebellion, when the public safety requires it."

== The Writ of Habeas Corpus ==
As per definition, it is a law stating that an individual cannot be imprisoned or held in custody inside a prison cell unless he/she has first been brought before a court of law, which decides whether or not it is legal for the person to be kept in prison.

== Barcelon v. Baker (5 Phil. Reports 87, 1905) ==
At the early years of the American Rule in the Philippines, lawlessness was rampant and criminal activities were at large. Governor-General James Francis Smith, with the consent of the Philippine Commission, suspended the privilege of the writ of habeas corpus in the provinces of Batangas and Cavite. A petition was raised questioning such suspension of the writ.

The Supreme Court issued a ruling sustaining the suspension of the privilege of the writ. It said that the decision of the Governor-General is his duty on his part, and that the court cannot question the acts of the executive and legislative branches of government. Simply put, the suspension of the privilege of the writ of habeas corpus is a political question that courts cannot decide upon.

== Montenegro v. Castañeda (91 Phil. Reports 882, 1949) ==
President Elpidio Quirino suspended the privilege of the writ of habeas corpus in some parts of Luzon in order to stifle the emergence of the Hukbalahap guerillas. Such suspension was again questioned in the Supreme Court. The court affirmed the president's acts of suspending the privilege of the writ of habeas corpus, based on the decision in the Barcelon case.

== Lansang v. Garcia (G.R. No. L-33964, December 11, 1971; 42 SCRA 448) ==
On August 21, 1971, grenades exploded at Plaza Miranda in the city of Manila during a public meeting of the Liberal Party. Acting on such an event, on August 23, 1971, President Ferdinand Marcos suspended the privilege of the writ of habeas corpus on the entire country. Petitions were filed in the Supreme Court for the release of several arrested persons.

The Supreme Court, through Chief Justice Roberto Concepcion, ruled that the suspension of the privilege of the writ of habeas corpus was proper for having factual and legal basis clearly provided forth by the government. But the Supreme Court, reversing the Barcelon and Montenegro cases, declared that the Judiciary has the authority to inquire into the factual basis of such suspension, and that the suspension is to be annulled if no legal ground would be established. Thus, such action is now considered justiciable to be decided by the courts.

== Aquino v. Enrile (G.R. No. L-35546, September 17, 1974, 59 SCRA 183) ==
Decided during martial law, it involved the petition of habeas corpus of Marcos' critics, notably Benigno Aquino Jr. and Jose W. Diokno. The Supreme Court decided unanimously to dismiss the petitions, but as Chief Justice Querube Makalintal put it, "there was no agreement as to the manner the issues would be treated and developed. The same destination would be reached, so to speak, but through different routes and by means of different vehicles of approach." He said that the reason why the Court did not produce a single, collegial opinion, among others, was that the members of the Supreme Court are conscious of "the future verdict of history" upon their stand.

Even before the cases were decided, Diokno, to the chagrin of the Supreme Court, opted to withdraw his petition on the ground that no fair decision can be made of the court to render him justice. What made it worse was the fact that before the Supreme Court could respond to Diokno's challenge, Marcos issued an order releasing him and the other petitioners, leaving Aquino behind.

Justice Fred Ruiz Castro opined that the declaration of martial law automatically suspends the application of the said writ, thus Aquino cannot be released. He said that martial law "is founded upon the principle that the state has a right to protect itself against those who would destroy it, and has therefore been likened to the right of an individual to self-defense."

== Garcia-Padilla v. Enrile (L-61388, April 20, 1983 ,121 SCRA 472) ==
In this decision involving subversion, the Supreme Court reversed the Lansang ruling and reverted to the Barcelon and Montenegro ruling that the suspension of the privilege of the writ of habeas corpus is a political question.

== The 1987 Philippine Constitution ==
The present Philippine Constitution, in reaction to the Marcos regime, adopted a procedure in cases of suspension of the writ or declaration of martial law by the president.

It states that in case of invasion or rebellion, when the public safety requires it, the President may request to suspend the privilege of the writ of habeas corpus for a period not exceeding sixty days, or place the Philippines or any part of the country under martial law. Congress must approve the request. Within forty-eight hours from the proclamation of martial law or the suspension of the privilege of the writ of habeas corpus, the President shall submit a report in person or in writing to the Congress. The Congress, voting jointly, by a vote of at least a majority of all its Members in regular or special session, may revoke or extend such proclamation or suspension. If Congress is not in session it shall, convene without need of a call within twenty-four hours following such proclamation or suspension.

Such check and balance placed on the Supreme Court relied heavily on the Lansang case. It is provided that the Supreme Court may review the sufficiency of the factual basis of the proclamation of martial law or the suspension of the privilege of the writ of habeas corpus or the extension thereof. It is mandated to promulgate its decision within thirty days from its filing by any citizen.

The suspension of the privilege of the writ shall apply only to persons judicially charged for rebellion or offenses inherent in, or directly connected with, invasion. During the suspension of the privilege of the writ of habeas corpus, any person thus arrested or detained shall be judicially charged within three days, otherwise he shall be released.
