= Ratification Cases =

Javellana v. Executive Secretary
- Court: Supreme Court of the Philippines en banc
Full case name
JOSUE JAVELLANA, petitioner, vs. THE EXECUTIVE SECRETARY, THE SECRETARY OF NATIONAL DEFENSE, THE SECRETARY OF JUSTICE AND THE SECRETARY OF FINANCE, respondents.
Four consolidated petitions
- VIDAL TAN, J. ANTONIO ARANETA, ALEJANDRO ROCES, MANUEL CRUDO, ANTONIO U. MIRANDA, EMILIO DE PERALTA AND LORENZO M. TAÑADA, petitioners, vs. THE EXECUTIVE SECRETARY, THE SECRETARY OF FINANCE , THE SECRETARY OF JUSTICE, THE SECRETARY OF LAND REFORM, THE SECRETARY OF NATIONAL DEFENSE, THE AUDITOR GENERAL, THE BUDGET COMMISSIONER, THE CHAIRMAN OF PRESIDENTIAL COMMISSION ON REORGANIZATION, THE TREASURER OF THE PHILIPPINES, THE COMMISSION ON ELECTIONS AND THE COMMISSIONER OF CIVIL SERVICE, respondents. (G.R. No. L-36142)
- GERARDO ROXAS, AMBROSIO PADILLA, JOVITO R. SALONGA, SALVADOR H. LAUREL, RAMON V. MITRA, JR. and EVA ESTRADA-KALAW, petitioners, vs. ALEJANDRO MELCHOR, in his capacity as Executive Secretary; JUAN PONCE ENRILE, in his capacity as Secretary of National Defense; General ROMEO ESPINO, in his capacity as Chief of Staff of the Armed Forces of the Philippines; TANCIO E. CASTAÑEDA, in his capacity as Secretary General Services; Senator GIL J. PUYAT, in his capacity as President of the Senate; and Senator JOSE ROY, his capacity, as President Pro Tempore of the Senate, respondents. (G.R. No. L-36164)
- EDDIE B. MONTECLARO, [personally and in his capacity as President of the National Press Club of the Philippines], petitioner, vs. THE EXECUTIVE SECRETARY, THE SECRETARY OF PUBLIC INFORMATION, THE AUDITOR GENERAL, THE BUDGET COMMISSIONER & THE NATIONAL TREASURER, respondents. (G.R. No. L-36236)
- NAPOLEON V. DILAG, ALFREDO SALAPANTAN, JR., LEONARDO ASODISEN, JR., and RAUL M. GONZALEZ, petitioners, vs. THE HONORABLE EXECUTIVE SECRETARY, THE HONORABLE SECRETARY OF NATIONAL DEFENSE, THE HONORABLE BUDGET COMMISSIONER, THE HONORABLE AUDITOR GENERAL, respondents. (G.R. No. L-36283)
- G.R. numbers: L-36142, et al.
- Citation: 151-A Phil. 35; 50 SCRA 3

Ruling
- Ponente: Chief Justice Roberto Concepcion
- Cases were dismissed by the vote of the majority, No further judicial obstacle to the new Constitution being considered in force and effect.

Court membership
- Judge(s) sitting: Chief Justice Roberto Concepcion, and Associate Justices Querube Makalintal Calixto Zaldivar, Fred Ruiz Castro, Enrique Fernando, Claudio Teehankee, Antonio Barredo, Felix Makasiar, Felix Antonio and Salvador Esguerra
- Concurrence: Justices Querube Makalintal, Fred Ruiz Castro, Antonio Barredo, Felix Makasiar, Felix Antonio and Salvador Esguerra
- Dissent: Chief Justice Roberto Concepcion and Justices Calixto Zaldivar, Enrique Fernando and Claudio Teehankee

Javellana v. Executive Secretary, 151-A Phil. 35 (1973), was a 1973 Supreme Court of the Philippines case that allowed the 1973 Philippine Constitution to come into full force, and which later became the cornerstone of subsequent decisions whenever the validity of the 1973 Constitution was questioned.

Consolidated with four other similar petitions which became known as the Ratification Cases, the ruling led to President Ferdinand Marcos staying in office and ruling by decree until he was ousted by the People Power Revolution in 1986.

== Background ==
Marcos declared martial law on September 21, 1972. The Congress of the Philippines was then padlocked, and full legislative authority was vested on Marcos who ordered by decree. Many prominent members of the opposition, notably Benigno Aquino Jr. and Jose W. Diokno, were arrested and placed in military jails.

Despite the declaration of martial law, the 1971 Constitutional Convention continued. On November 29, 1972, the Convention approved the new constitution and the next day, Marcos issued Presidential Decree 73, "submitting to the Filipino people, for ratification or rejection, the Constitution of the Republic of the Philippines proposed by the 1971 Constitutional Convention, and appropriating funds therefor", as well as setting the plebiscite for ratification on January 15, 1973. Charito Planas, a staunch critic and later vice-mayor of Quezon City, filed a case, known as the Plebiscite Cases (Planas v. COMELEC (1973)) before the Supreme Court calling for a stop to the proposed ratification upon the grounds, among others, that the Presidential Decree "has no force and effect as law because the calling... of such plebiscite, the setting of guidelines for the conduct of the same, the prescription of the ballots to be used and the question to be answered by the voters, and the appropriation of public funds for the purpose, are, by the Constitution, lodged exclusively in Congress..." and "there is no proper submission to the people there being no freedom of speech, press and assembly, and there being no sufficient time to inform the people of the contents thereof."

On January 15, 1973, while the Plebiscite Cases were being heard in the Supreme Court, the president signed Proclamation No. 1102, which states that the 1973 Constitution was "ratified by an overwhelming majority of all the votes cast by the members of all the barangays (citizens' assemblies) throughout the Philippines..." during the 1973 constitutional plebiscite.

By virtue of that decree, the Supreme Court dismissed the case for being moot and academic, without prejudice to the filing of a case questioning the validity of Proclamation No. 1102.

== Filing and hearings ==
On January 20, 1973, Josue Javellana initially filed a case questioning Proclamation No. 1102. Similar petitions followed suit by Vidal Tan, J. Antonio Araneta, Alejandro Roces, Manuel Crudo, Antonio U. Miranda, Emilio de Peralta and Lorenzo M. Tañada on January 23, 1973; on February 3, 1973, by Eddie Monteclaro, (as President of the National Press Club of the Philippines); and on February 12, 1973, by Napoleon V. Dilag, Alfredo Salapantan Jr., Leonardo Asodisen Jr. and Raul M. Gonzalez. Likewise, on January 23, 1973, several senators filed a case against the Executive Secretary, as well as Senate President Gil Puyat and Senate President Pro Tempore Jose Roy, alleging that Congress must still hold session, and that they were being prevented to do so by agents of the Government, invoking Proclamation 1102.

The lawyers representing the petitioners included Ramon A. Gonzales, Lorenzo Tañada, Jovito Salonga, Sedfrey Ordoñez, Francisco "Soc" Rodrigo, Pablo Sanidad, Joker Arroyo, Rogelio B. Padilla, and Raul M. Gonzalez. Solicitor General Estelito P. Mendoza, Solicitor Vicente V. Mendoza and Solicitor Reynato S. Puno represented the government, as well as Arturo Tolentino for Gil J. Puyat and Jose Roy.

Morning and afternoon hearings were held by the Supreme Court from February 12 to 16, 1973. During the deliberations, former Senator Lorenzo Tañada occasionally rebuked the justices. After the deliberations, the parties were allowed to submit their notes and other arguments.

The Supreme Court at that time consisted of Chief Justice Roberto Concepcion, and Associate Justices Querube Makalintal, Calixto Zaldivar, Fred Ruiz Castro, Enrique Fernando, Claudio Teehankee, Antonio Barredo, Felix Makasiar, Felix Antonio and Salvador Esguerra. Of the members of the court, Concepcion, Makalintal and Zaldivar were the justices not initially appointed by Marcos, Concepcion being appointed in 1954 (he was later appointed Chief Justice in 1966), Makalintal in 1962 and Zaldivar in 1964.

== Decision ==
Chief Justice Roberto Concepcion wrote the decision. He outlined the summary of facts, then his own dissenting opinion of the case in which he said that the 1973 Constitution has not been properly ratified according to law, and then proceeded to make the summary of votes by the members of the court.

The issues raised were:

1. Is the issue of the validity of Proclamation No. 1102 a (political) question?
2. Has the 1973 Constitution been ratified validly?
3. Has the Constitution been acquiesced to (with or without valid ratification) by the people?
4. Are petitioners entitled to relief?
5. Is the Constitution in force?

The court was severely divided on the issues raised in the petition, but when the crucial question of whether the petitioners are entitled to relief, six members of the court (Justices Makalintal, Castro, Barredo, Makasiar, Antonio and Esguerra) voted to dismiss the petition, thus upholding the 1973 Constitution and Marcos's rule. Concepcion, together with Justices Zaldivar, Fernando and Teehankee, voted to grant the relief being sought.

In the issue of whether or not the 1973 Constitution has been ratified validly, six members of the court (the Chief Justice, and Justices Makalintal, Zaldivar, Castro, Fernando and Teehankee), answered that the Constitution was not validly ratified. Barredo's opinion was equivocal in its nature according to Cruz, but Joaquin Bernas, in his book on the Constitution, annotates that his opinion would be counted as concurring with the six justices. But it is unusual that of those who said that the Constitution was not validly ratified, Querube Makalintal and Fred Ruiz Castro voted to dismiss the petitions. Makalintal and Castro, in a joint opinion, justified their non-granting of relief on the basis of a case in relation to Luther v. Borden (48 U.S. (7 How.) 1; 12 L.Ed. 581, 1849). It said that the inquiry was indeed a political determination and not a judicial one.

It was speculated that the two justices, being next in line for the position of Chief Justice, voted as such so as not to lose favor with Marcos. Makalintal was subsequently appointed Speaker of the Interim Batasang Pambansa, and Castro evidently showing his support of the Marcos regime through his court decisions and public statements.

The last sentence of the decision said, "This being the vote of the majority, there is no further judicial obstacle to the new Constitution being considered in force and effect." It is disputed as to whether Concepcion placed this sentence intentionally or someone inserted these words after he signed the decision.

== Aftermath ==
The Ratification Cases removed any legal challenge to the Marcos presidency. He had such power as President of the Philippines until he was forced out of power in the 1986 People Power Revolution.

Chief Justice Concepcion took a leave 18 days after the decision became public (50 days from his scheduled retirement) supposedly because he was disappointed on the outcome of the decision. He would later become a member of the Philippine Constitutional Commission of 1986 that drafted the 1987 Philippine Constitution. Drawing from his experiences in the martial law years, he introduced several innovations designed to assure the independence of the Supreme Court, such as the Judicial and Bar Council and the express conferment on the Court the power to review any acts of government.

In The Conjugal Dictatorship of Ferdinand and Imelda Marcos, it was observed by Primitivo Mijares in the Chapter "Spineless Judiciary: Legitimizing A Pretender" that, while the Ratification Cases was resolved in a matter of months, the other cases involving Marcos’ imprisoned critics were not decided until a year or two later. In fact, some of the critics withdrew their petitions, mostly for writ of habeas corpus, due to the lack of confidence that the Supreme Court would grant their relief.

Makalintal, when he became Chief Justice, also took a similar approach of Concepcion in deciding the case of the Habeas Corpus Cases of Benigno Aquino Jr. by summarizing the diverse votes of the members of the court. He explained the reason why there was no collegial opinion by the Court, among others, that the justices of the Supreme Court are conscious of "the future verdict of history".

At the time of Chief Justices Castro and Fernando, the Supreme Court, using the ‘legitimizing’ power, affirmed the legality of the Ratification Cases through several cases, such as Sanidad v. COMELEC (1976) and Occena v. COMELEC (1981).

Of the four justices who voted to grant relief, Concepcion and Calixto Zaldivar left the court due to retirement. Justices Teehankee, first identified with the regime, began to show his independence by consistently dissenting on several decisions made by the court. He was accompanied in such dissents by Justice Cecilia Muñoz-Palma, and later, by Vicente Abad Santos. Fernando, though expected that he would be one to oppose the excesses of the Marcos's regime, became its supporter.

== Legacy ==
The decision in the Ratification Cases are still studied by students of Philippine Law with respect to the proper ratification and approval of a new Constitution. It also gave a lesson and reminder of the Marcos regime and its effects to the Filipino people.

It also shows that the Supreme Court are composed of human beings susceptible of error, in the words of Justice Isagani Cruz, "...is not an ivory tower occupied by demigods but not an infallible institution composed of persons slightly higher than their fellowmen, perhaps, but also showing their foibles and failings."

== See also ==
- Philippine Constitutional Convention of 1971
- Chief Justice of the Supreme Court of the Philippines
