= Roberto Concepcion =

Chief Justice of the Philippines from 1966 to 1973

The Honorable Roberto Concepcion
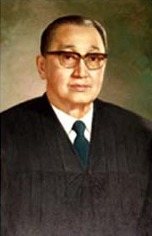
- Official portrait

10th Chief Justice of the Supreme Court of the Philippines
- In office June 17, 1966 – April 18, 1973
- Nominated by: Ferdinand Marcos
- Preceded by: César Bengzon
- Succeeded by: Querube Makalintal

62nd Associate Justice of the Philippine Supreme Court
- In office February 9, 1954 – June 17, 1966
- Nominated by: Ramon Magsaysay
- Preceded by: Roman Ozaeta; 2nd Supreme Court Term
- Succeeded by: Francisco Capistrano

Member of the 1986 Constitutional Commission
- In office June 2, 1986 – October 15, 1986

Personal details
- Born: Roberto Reyes Concepcion; June 7, 1903 Manila, Philippine Islands
- Died: May 3, 1987 (aged 83) Manila, Philippines
- Children: 5
- Education: University of Santo Tomas
- Profession: Lawyer

Roberto Reyes Concepcion (June 7, 1903 – May 3, 1987) was the Chief Justice of the Supreme Court of the Philippines from June 17, 1966 until April 18, 1973. He is remembered in the history of the Philippine Supreme Court for protecting the independence of court, and for having fought decisions which would have legitimized the dictatorship of President Ferdinand Marcos. In recognition of his efforts against authoritarian rule, Concepcion's name was inscribed on the Wall of Remembrance at the Bantayog ng mga Bayani in 1994.

Concepcion formally left the court in 1973 upon reaching the mandatory retirement age but had, in reality, taken leave of absence 50 days earlier to express his dissent over the court's decision in the Ratification Cases, which upheld the 1973 Constitution, and paved the way for extending Marcos' regime.

== Family ==
Concepcion was born in Manila on June 7, 1903, to Isidro Concepcion and Catalina Reyes.

He was married to Dolores Concepcion by whom he had five children: Catalina C. Buena, Carmen V. Valero, Roberto Jr., Milagros and Jesus.

== Judicial career ==
He graduated his Bachelor of Laws with summa cum laude from the University of Santo Tomas in 1924, then placed first in the bar examinations that same year. Starting out as a private practitioner for only four years, he then worked at the Office of the Solicitor General as an assistant, from which he was subsequently appointed as a judge of the Court of First Instance in 1940, then a Court of Appeals Justice in 1946 before being appointed as Supreme Court Associate Justice in 1954.

== Under martial law ==
Concepcion wrote the decision in the Ratification Cases which upheld the 1973 Constitution. In the said decision, he wrote the summary of facts, then his own opinion of the case (which he said that the 1973 Constitution has not been properly ratified according to law), then proceeded to make the summary of votes.

The court was divided on the issues raised in the petition: but when the question of whether the petitioners in the cases are entitled to relief, Concepcion, together with three others answered ‘Yes’, while six other members denied the relief being sought, thus upholding the 1973 Constitution and made legitimate the rule of Marcos.

When the decision came out to the public, the last sentence of Concepción's ponencia contained the following last words:

"This being the vote of the majority, there is no further judicial obstacle to the new Constitution being considered in force and effect".

It is disputed as to whether or not Concepcion placed the said sentence intentionally, or that someone intercalated the said words after he signed the decision. In any case, Concepcion wrote "I dissent" after this sentence.

After leaving the Supreme Court, he became one of the advocates against the ensuing Marcos regime. Together with former Justice and best friend, J.B.L. Reyes, they encountered cases which questioned the validity of government acts, especially in the wake of suppressed civil and individual liberties at that time.

He also found time to return to his alma mater, UST, where he briefly served as dean of its Faculty of Civil Law.

== Post-Marcos years ==
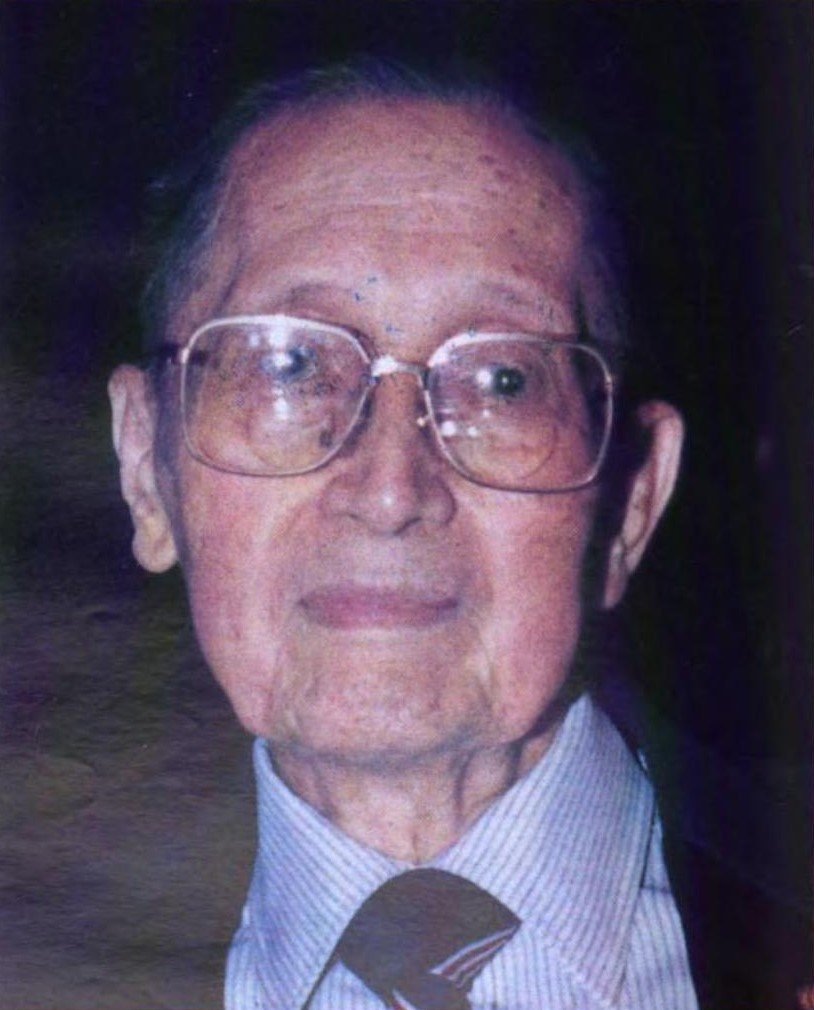
Concepcion from the Official Directory of the Constitutional Commission, c. 1986

After the toppling of Marcos from power, Concepcion was appointed as one of the commissioners tasked to draft the 1987 Philippine Constitution. As one of its members, he is responsible for crafting the contents regarding civil liberties, as well as an added provision in the Executive Powers of the President, a clause limiting the effects of martial law with respect to the writ of habeas corpus, based on one of the decided cases of the Supreme Court in which he wrote. As chairman of the Judiciary Committee, he was responsible for introducing provisions designed to strengthen the independence of the judiciary, which was clearly abused by the Marcos regime.

== Decisions and opinions ==
People v. Hernandez (99 Phil. Reports 515, 1956): the Supreme Court, through then Associate Justice Concepcion, ruled that rebellion cannot be complexed with other crimes, such as murder and arson. Rebellion in itself would include and absorb the said crimes, thus granting the accused his right to bail.

Stonehill v. Diokno (G.R. No. L-19550, June 19, 1967; 20 SCRA 383): It was ruled that the articles that were seized illegally by the government cannot be used as admissible evidence, thus adopting the fruit of the poisonous tree doctrine in Philippine jurisdiction. It abrogated the principle established in an earlier case (Moncado v. People's Court, 80 Phil. Reports 1). During the time between the Moncado and Stonehill decisions, Concepcion dissented in every case which would uphold the admissibility illegally seized evidence, citing the U.S. cases of Weeks v. U.S.(232 U.S. 383, 1920) and Elkins v. U.S.(364 U.S. 206, 1960). Said case also established the definition of probable cause, which requires that allegations should be specific in the description of the offense or crime committed, as well as to the evidence subject of the search warrant.

Lansang v. Garcia (G.R. No. L-33964, December 11, 1971; 42 SCRA 448): The Supreme Court, through Concepcion, while it upheld the suspension of the writ of habeas corpus by Marcos, declared that the Judiciary has the authority to inquire to the factual basis of such suspension, and that the suspension is to be annulled if no legal ground would be established. This doctrine is now established by the 1987 Philippine Constitution as it is included in one of its provisions.

Javellana v. Executive Secretary (G.R. No. L-36142, March 31, 1973; 50 SCRA 30): Concepción's last ponencia, he formally delivered the summary of votes in upholding the 1973 Philippine Constitution, but delivered in his own opinion his disapproval that the said Constitution was in effect and ratified properly by the Filipino people.

== Sources ==
- Bernas, Joaquin G., S.J. (2003). The 1987 Constitution of the Republic of the Philippines: a Commentary. Rex Book Store, Manila
- Cruz, Isagani A. (2000). Res Gestae: A Brief History of the Supreme Court. Rex Book Store, Manila
- Javellana v. Executive Secretary (G.R. No. L-36142, March 31, 1973).Supreme Court Reports Annotated, Volume 50, pp. 30. Central Law Book Publishing, Manila
- Zaide, Sonia M. (1996). Philippines: A Unique Nation. All-Nations Publishing Co., Manila

Legal offices
Preceded by César Bengzon	Chief Justice of the Supreme Court of the Philippines; 1966–1973	Succeeded by Querube Makalintal
