= 1973 Philippine constitutional plebiscite =

- January 10–15, 1973

Adopting the constitution
For	90.67%
Against	9.33%

Calling a plebiscite to ratify the constitution
For	9.04%
Against	90.96%

The Philippine constitutional plebiscite of 1973 occurred from 10 to 15 January which ratified the 1973 Constitution of the Philippines.

== Background ==
In 1970, 320 delegates were elected to a constitutional convention which began to meet in 1971. On 23 September 1972, President Ferdinand Marcos issued the formal declaration of martial law which led to the arrests of 11 conveners, alongside government critics and journalists, by the Armed Forces of the Philippines and the Philippine Constabulary. The convention then re-convened and wrote a constitution in line with what President Ferdinand Marcos wanted, at least, according to many critics and victims of martial law.

Marcos issued Presidential Decree No. 86 calling for the cancellation of the plebiscite and instituted barangays' citizens' assemblies to ratify the new constitution by a plebiscite from 10–15 January 1973. Alongside the utilization of citizens' assemblies, the voting age was also reduced to 15. Voting in citizens' assemblies took place through viva voce voting, similar to parliamentary procedure, rather than the standard secret ballot that had been used up until that point.

During the course of voting, military men were stationed in prominent positions to intimidate voters. And mayors were given quotas for "yes" votes, while "no" votes were occasionally not recorded. Official figures state that 90% of voters voted in favor of adopting the new constitution, although some communities did not partake in voting.

On 17 January 1973, Marcos issued Proclamation No. 1102 certifying and proclaiming that the 1973 Constitution had been ratified by the Filipino people and thereby was in effect.

These results were challenged during the Ratification Cases heard by the Supreme Court of the Philippine in 1973. The court upheld the results and the ratification of the 1973 Constitution.

== Results ==
=== Approving the constitution ===
Are you in favor of adopting the proposed constitution?
Choice	Votes	%
For	14,976,561	95.27
Against	743,869	4.73
Total	15,720,430	100.00
Valid votes	15,720,430	78.96
Invalid/blank votes	4,188,330	21.04
Total votes	19,908,760	100.00
Registered voters/turnout	22,883,632	87.00
Source: Proclamation No. 1102, s. 1973

Question #1 of the 1973 Philippine constitutional plebiscites results (excluding invalid votes)
Yes; 14,976,561 (95.3%)
▲50%

=== Having another plebiscite to ratify the constitution ===
Do you still want a plebiscite to be called to ratify the new Constitution?
Choice	Votes	%
Yes	1,421,616	9.04
No	14,298,814	90.96
Total	15,720,430	100.00
Valid votes	15,720,430	78.96
Invalid/blank votes	4,188,330	21.04
Total votes	19,908,760	100.00
Registered voters/turnout	22,883,632	87.00
Source: Proclamation No. 1102, s. 1973

Question #2 of the 1973 Philippine constitutional plebiscites results (excluding invalid votes)
No; 14,298,814 (91%)
▲50%

== See also ==
- Constitution of the Philippines
- Elections in the Philippines
- Politics of the Philippines
- Martial Law under Ferdinand Marcos
- Ratification Cases
