= Purificacion Quisumbing =

Filipino human rights activist

Purificacion Valera Quisumbing (c. 1934 – December 1, 2011) was a Filipino human rights activist who served as the chair of Commission on Human Rights from 2002 to 2008. She was a graduate of the University of Philippines.

In March 2011, the United Nations Human Rights Council re-elected Quisumbing to a second, three-year term on the council's advisory committee.

Quisumbing died on 1 December 2011, aged 77.
