= Querube Makalintal =

Chief Justice of the Philippines from 1973 to 1975

The Honorable Querube C. Makalintal
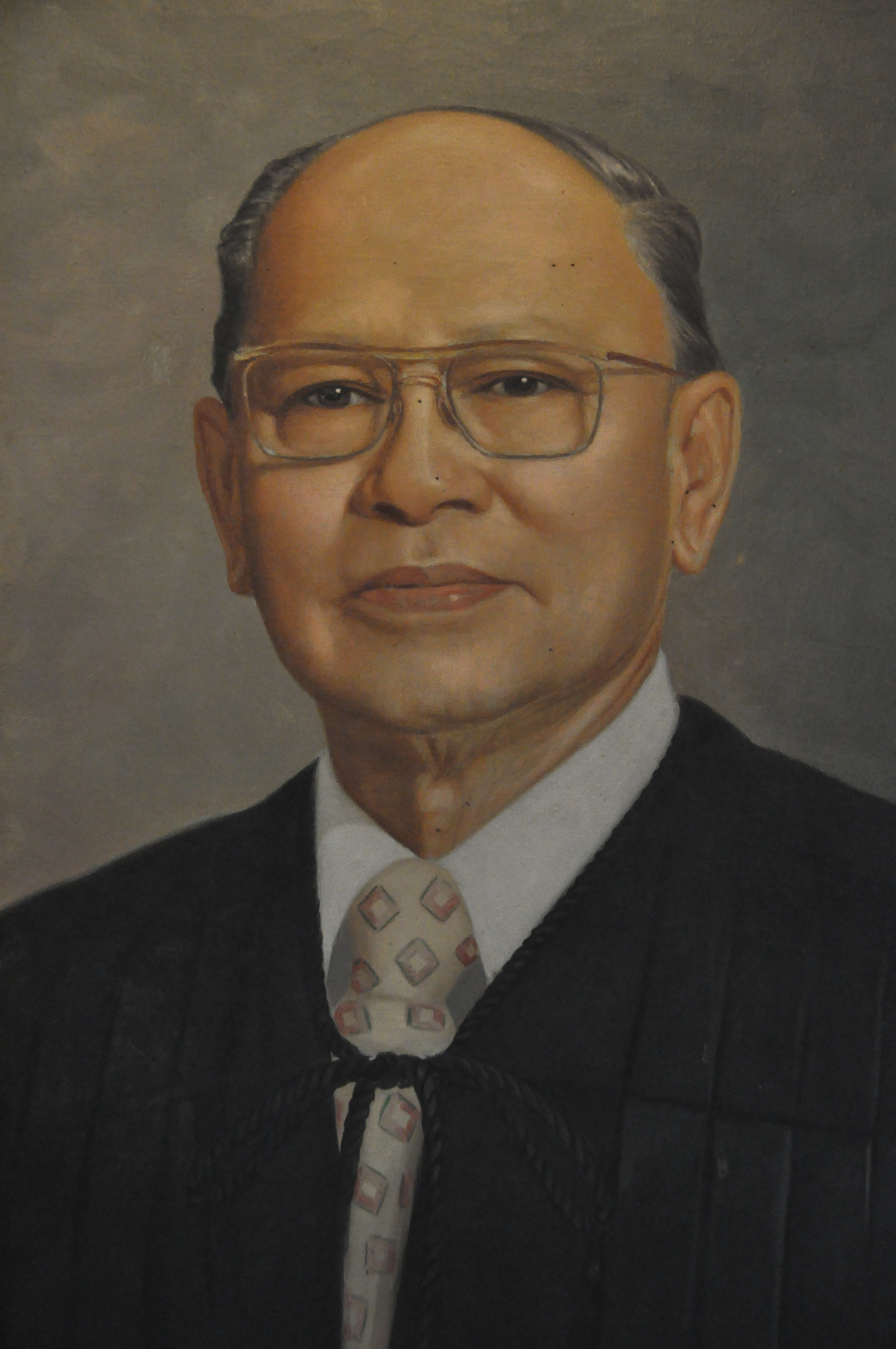

Speaker of the Interim Batasang Pambansa
- In office July 31, 1978 – June 30, 1984
- Preceded by: Cornelio Villareal (as Speaker of the House of Representatives)
- Succeeded by: Nicanor Yñiguez

Member of the Interim Batasang Pambansa
- In office June 12, 1978 – June 30, 1984
- Constituency: Region IV

11th Chief Justice of the Supreme Court of the Philippines
- In office October 21, 1973 – December 22, 1975
- Appointed by: Ferdinand Marcos
- Preceded by: Roberto Concepcion
- Succeeded by: Fred Ruiz Castro

Associate Justice of the Supreme Court of the Philippines
- In office May 23, 1962 – October 21, 1973
- Appointed by: Diosdado Macapagal
- Preceded by: César Bengzon
- Succeeded by: Ramon Fernandez

Solicitor General of the Philippines
- In office February 9, 1954 – August 31, 1954
- President: Ramon Magsaysay
- Preceded by: Juan Liwag
- Succeeded by: Ambrosio Padilla

Personal details
- Born: Querube Cortinas Makalintal; December 22, 1910 San Jose, Batangas, Philippine Islands
- Died: November 9, 2002 (aged 91) Manila, Philippines
- Resting place: Loyola Memorial Park, Parañaque, Philippines
- Party: KBL
- Children: 3
- Education: University of the Philippines Diliman (AA, LL.B)

Querube Cortinas Makalintal (December 22, 1910 – November 8, 2002) was the Chief Justice of the Supreme Court of the Philippines from 1973 to 1975 and Speaker of the Interim Batasang Pambansa from 1978 to 1984.

== Early life ==
Makalintal was born on December 22, 1910, in San Jose, Batangas. He was born to Ambrosio Makalintal and Rufina Cortinas. He finished his Associate in Arts and Bachelor of Law at the University of the Philippines, where he was a member of the Upsilon Sigma Phi fraternity. He placed 7th in the 1933 Bar Examinations and 3rd in the 1934 Law Clerk Examinations by Civil Service.

== Career ==
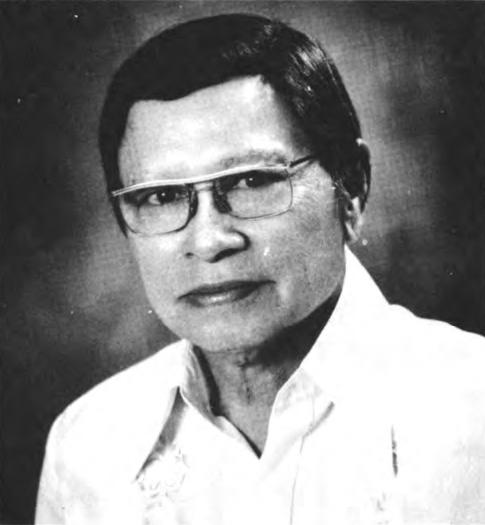
Makalintal as speaker of the Interim Batasang Pambansa

Makalintal was appointed Solicitor General in 1952. He then served as Associate Justice and Presiding Justice of the Court of Appeals.

On May 23, 1962, he was appointed Associate Justice of the Supreme Court by President Diosdado Macapagal. On October 24, 1973, he was appointed Chief Justice of the Supreme Court under President Ferdinand Marcos.

After reaching the compulsory retirement age of 65 under the 1973 Constitution, he served as Speaker of the Interim Batasang Pambansa from 1978 to 1984.

== Martial law years ==
Makalintal, together with Justice Fred Ruiz Castro, was the "swing vote" in the Ratification Cases which upheld the 1973 Constitution, which paved the way of extending Marcos' regime. When the question of whether the petitioners are entitled to relief, the two justices answered "No", thus upholding the 1973 Constitution and made legitimate the rule of Marcos and his power.

In the cases denying Benigno Aquino Jr. of his privilege of the writ of habeas corpus, the decision of the High Court was not a traditional sense of consensus on both the conclusions and the reasons for the conclusions. Makalintal, as Chief Justice, delivered the summary of votes, and explained the reason why there was no collegial opinion by the Court. He said, among others, that the justices of the Supreme Court are conscious of "the future verdict of history" upon their stand. Aquino warned of such verdict of history, and said, "Today, you are my judges. Tomorrow, history will judge you."

== Death ==
Makalintal died on November 8, 2002, in Manila, Philippines. He was 91.

He is survived by his children Eduardo, Maria Socorro, and Ambrosio.

Legal offices
Preceded by Roberto Concepcion	Chief Justice of the Supreme Court of the Philippines; 1973 – 1975	Succeeded by Fred Ruiz Castro
Political offices
Preceded by Juan Liwag	Solicitor General of the Philippines; 1954	Succeeded by Ambrosio Padilla
Preceded by Cornelio Villareal	Speaker of the Interim Batasang Pambansa; 1978–1984	Succeeded by Nicanor Yñiguez
