= Commission on Human Rights (Philippines) =

Philippine constitutional commission for human rights

- Komisyon sa mga Karapatang Pantao
- Seal

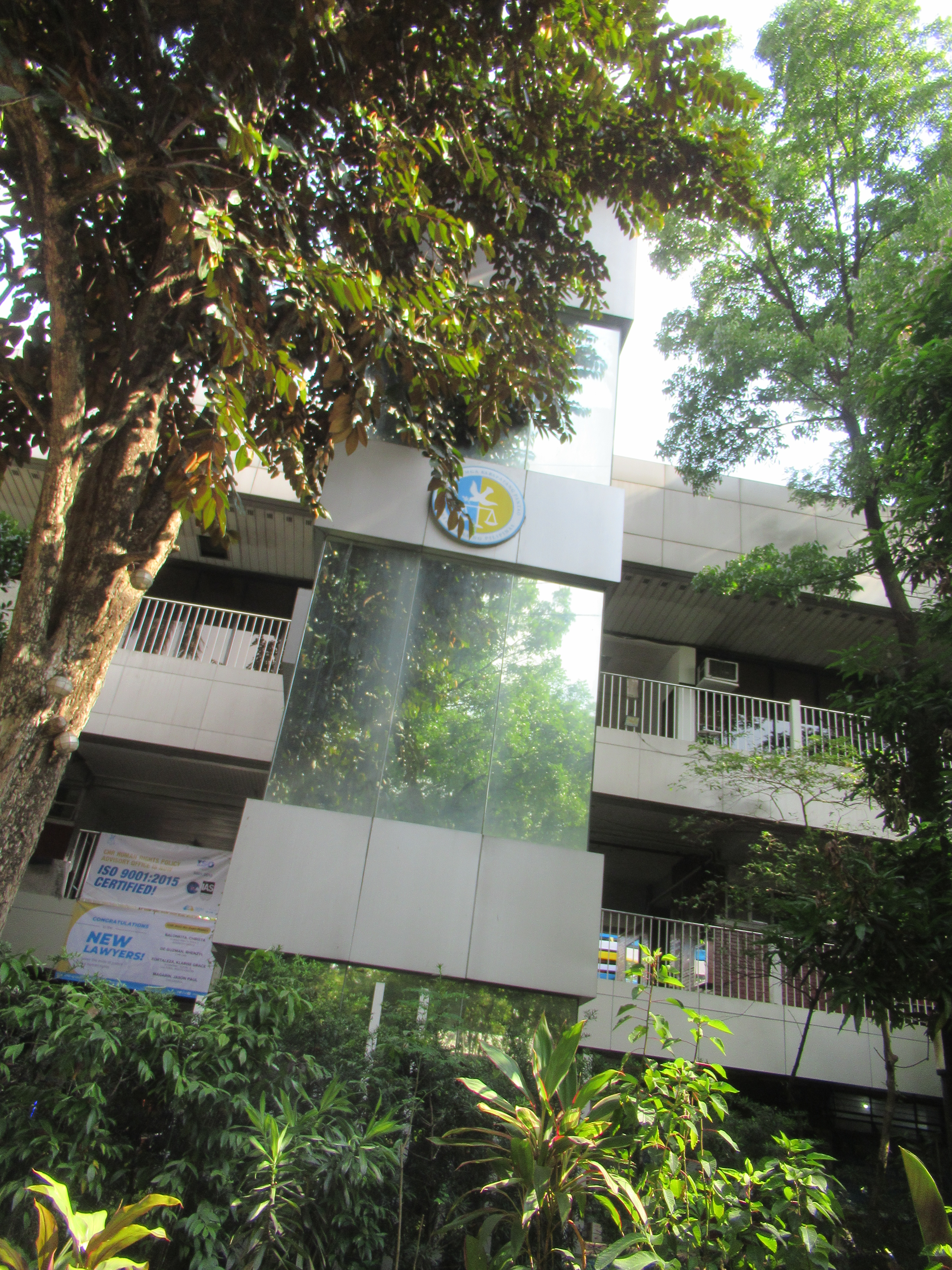

Agency overview
- Formed: May 5, 1987
- Preceding agency: Presidential Committee on Human Rights
- Jurisdiction: Philippines
- Headquarters: CHR Central Office, Commonwealth Avenue, Diliman, Quezon City, Philippines
- Employees: 651 (2024)
- Annual budget: ₱958,963,000 (2023)
- Agency executive: Richard Paat Palpal-latoc, Chairperson
- Website: www.chr.gov.ph

The Commission on Human Rights (Filipino: Komisyon sa mga Karapatang Pantao) (CHR) is an independent constitutional office created under the 1987 Constitution of the Philippines, with the primary function of investigating all forms of human rights violations involving civil and political rights in the Philippines.

The commission was first founded and led by Chairperson José W. Diokno, a prominent lawyer and the father of human rights in the country, whom the surrounding park of the headquarters now known as the Liwasang Diokno (Diokno Freedom Park) was named after. Diokno also founded the premier human rights network called the Free Legal Assistance Group (FLAG). Furthermore, the hall inside the compound is called Bulwagang Ka Pepe or the Ka Pepe Hall, which features a sculpted bust and large mural of the late senator.

The CHR is composed of a chairperson and four members. Commissioners hold a term of office of seven years without reappointment. The Philippine Constitution requires that a majority of the commission's members must be lawyers. As a National Human Rights Institution, the Commission enjoys Status A or top accreditation by the Global Alliance of National Human Rights Institutions based on the 1993 Paris Principles. It was announced on 1 July that The CHR will start accepting online complaints to make it easier and more accessible for Filipinos to seek assistance from the CHR. The portal will be operational starting 01 July 2024, marking a significant advancement in the delivery of human rights services in the country. The CHR Central Office at UP Diliman complex is currently composed of the freedom park surrounded by two buildings: the converted State Accounting and Auditing Center (SAAC) Building which houses the offices, and the Jose Luis Martin C. Gascon Building for other offices and events.

== History ==
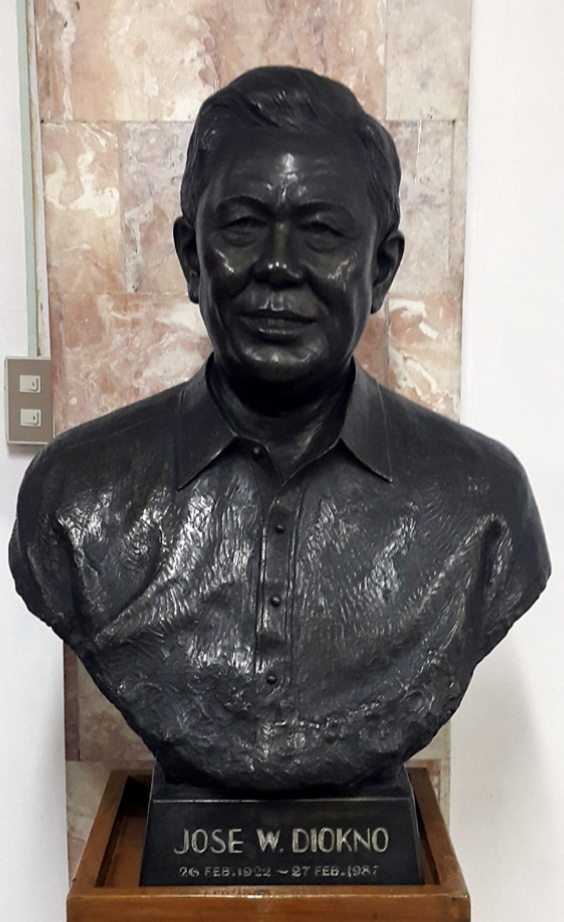
Bust of José W. Diokno at the Bulwagang Ka Pepe of the CHR Building

=== Prior creation ===
On February 20, 1986, then President Ferdinand Marcos signed Presidential Decree No. 2036 creating the Commission on Human Rights with the Vice President being the chairperson and Prime Minister as Vice Chairperson and shall be attached to the Office of the President for general direction and coordination. This decree, which was Marcos' last issued presidential decree was not implemented as he fled to the United States days after and replaced by Corazon Aquino through the EDSA People Power Revolution. Nearly a month later, on March 18, 1986, then President Aquino by virtue of the 1986 Freedom Constitution, signed Executive Order No. 8 creating the Presidential Committee on Human Rights. One function introduced in this executive order is the authority by the PCHR to issue subpoenas and subpoenas duces tecum directing any person to attend and testify at any hearing conducted by the PCHR.

=== Creation ===
After the ratification of the 1987 Philippine Constitution on February 2, 1987, which provides for the establishment of a Commission on Human Rights, then President Aquino, signed Executive Order No. 163 on May 5, 1987, creating the Commission on Human Rights and abolished the Presidential Committee on Human Rights. The commission was created as an independent office mandated to investigate complaints of human rights violations, promote the protection of, respect for and the enhancements of the people's human rights including civil and political rights.

=== Duterte administration ===
On July 24, 2017, during his State of the Nation Address (SONA), Philippine president Rodrigo Duterte said that the commission was "better abolished." The CHR responded in a statement that only a change to the 1987 Constitution could possibly abolish it.

On the evening of September 12, 2017, the House of Representatives of the Philippines voted 119–32 to give the CHR a budget of only ₱1,000 for the entire year of 2018 upon the motion of SAGIP Party-list representative Rodante Marcoleta, which, if made law, would have effectively abolished the commission. The commission had reportedly asked Congress for a budget of ₱623,380,000, and it condemned the vote. As of 13 September 2017, the budget had not been finalized and was still subject to further amendment before approval by the Senate of the Philippines and by the President. If the Senate had rejected the proposed CHR budget, such action would have triggered a bicameral committee made of members of both houses to resolve the dispute. On September 25, the House approved by a vote of 223–9 a P3.8-trillion final budget for 2018, which included ₱508.5 million for the CHR.

=== Marcos Jr. administration ===
In June 2025, under the administration of President Ferdinand Marcos Jr., the commission was given a courtesy visit by newly-installed Philippine National Police chief Nicolas Torre, where he affirmed the CHR's new oversight function over the police agency by stating that "The CHR is our boss on the protection of human rights."

== Mandates and functions ==
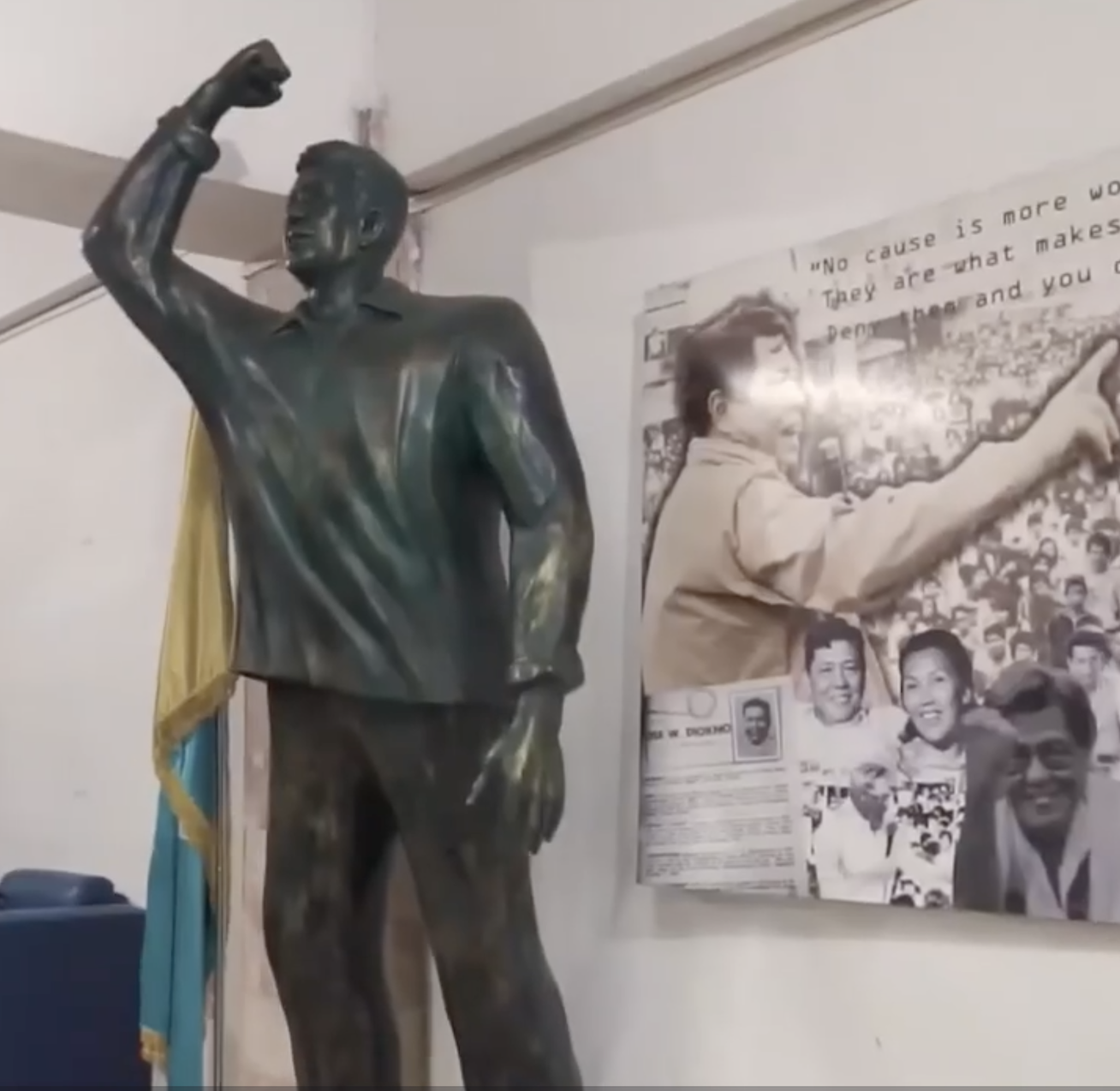
Bulwagang Ka Pepe and the seven-foot statue of Diokno, apart from a similar bronze sculpture at Liwasang Diokno. Sculpted by Julie Lluch.

The Commission derives its mandates from the Constitution, relevant domestic laws, and the eight core International Human Rights Instruments to which the Philippines is a State Party, as well as other United Nations Human Rights Conventions newly enforced.

Under Section 18, Article XIII of the Philippine Constitution, the government has a duty to protect civil and political rights of citizens in the Philippines. Based on the Philippine Constitution, the commission has a broad mandate, which can be categorized into three major functional areas:

- Human Rights Protection – Investigation and case management of complaints of violations, including all the powers and services in aid of investigation, of civil and political rights as well as economic, social, and cultural rights. Such powers and services include: citing for contempt for violations of its rules of procedure; legal aid and counseling; visitorial powers over jails and detention facilities; application of forensic techniques in aid of investigation; witness protection; and, financial assistance to victims
- Human Rights Promotion, which includes the wide range of strategies for policy, advocacy, promotion, social mobilization, education, training, public information, communication, research, networking and linkages
- Human Rights Policy Advisory derived from monitoring government's compliance with the treaty obligations that the Philippines has acceded to: International Covenant on Civil and Political Rights (ICCPR), International Covenant on Economic, Social and Cultural Rights (ICESCR), Convention Against Torture and Other Degrading Treatment or Punishment (CAT), Convention on the Elimination of All Forms of Discrimination Against Women (CEDAW), Convention Against Racial Discrimination (CERD), Convention on the Rights of the Child (CRC), Convention on the Protection of Migrant Workers and their Families (CMW); Convention on the Rights of Persons with Disabilities (CRPD). This also includes the entire aspect of monitoring and evaluating the performance of the Executive, Legislative, and Judiciary to translate international human rights standards into national policies, laws, and practice.

The Supreme Court of the Philippines, in Cariño v. Commission on Human Rights, 204 SCRA 483 (1991), declared that the Commission did not possess the power of adjudication, and emphasized that its functions were primarily investigatory.

The Commission on Human Rights have the following powers and functions:

1. Investigate, on its own or on complaint by any party, all forms of human rights violations involving civil and political rights
2. Adopt its operational guidelines and rules of procedure, and cite for contempt for violations thereof in accordance with the Rules of Court
3. Provide appropriate legal measures for the protection of human rights of all persons within the Philippines, as well as Filipinos residing abroad, and provide for preventive measures and legal aid services to the under-privileged whose human rights have been violated or need protection
4. Exercise visitorial powers over jails, prisons, or detention facilities
5. Establish a continuing program of research, education, and information to enhance respect for the primacy of human rights
6. Recommend to Congress effective measures to promote human rights and to provide for compensation to victims of violations of human rights, or their families;
7. Monitor the Philippine Government's compliance with international treaty obligations on human rights
8. Grant immunity from prosecution to any person whose testimony or whose possession of documents or other evidence is necessary or convenient to determine the truth in any investigation conducted by it or under its authority;
9. Request the assistance of any department, bureau, office, or agency in the performance of its functions
10. Appoint its officers and employees in accordance with law
11. Perform such other duties and functions as may be provided by law

== Composition ==
The chairperson and commissioners of the commission have fixed seven-year terms that start on May 5.

Qualifications for CHR chairperson and commissioners are as follows:

1. A natural-born citizen of the Philippines;
2. At least thirty-five years of age; and
3. Has not been a candidate for any elective position preceding their appointment.

Commission (Term)	Chairperson (Tenure)	Commissioner (Tenure)	Commissioner (Tenure)	Commissioner (Tenure)	Commissioner (Tenure)	Appointing president
1st May 5, 1987 – May 5, 1994	Mary Concepcion Bautista (Note: Died in office) December 17, 1987 – September 22, 1992	Abelardo L. Aportadera Jr. July 3,1987 – 1992	Samuel M. Soriano 1987 – May 5, 1994	Hesiquio R. Mallillin 1987 – May 5, 1994	Narciso C. Monteiro 1988 – May 5, 1994	Corazon Aquino
1st May 5, 1987 – May 5, 1994	Sedfrey Ordoñez 1993 – May 5, 1994	Paulyn P. Sicam 1992 – May 5, 1994	Samuel M. Soriano 1987 – May 5, 1994	Hesiquio R. Mallillin 1987 – May 5, 1994	Narciso C. Monteiro 1988 – May 5, 1994	Fidel V. Ramos
2nd May 5, 1994 – May 5, 2001	Aurora P. Navarette-Reciña 1994 – May 5, 2001	Jorge R. Coquia 1994 – May 5, 2001	Vicente P. Sibulo 1994 – May 5, 2001	Mercedes V. Contreras 1994 – May 5, 2001	Nasser A. Marohomsalic 1994 – May 5, 2001	Fidel V. Ramos
3rd May 5, 2001 – May 5, 2008	Aurora P. Navarette-Reciña May 5, 2001 – August 2002	Purificacion Quisumbing November 2001 – May 5, 2008	Dominador N. Calamba II November 2001 – May 5, 2008	Eligio P. Mallari November 2001 – May 5, 2008	Malik G. Marandang (Note: Left office after appointment as ambassador to Libya) November 2001 – January 29. 2004	Gloria Macapagal Arroyo
3rd May 5, 2001 – May 5, 2008	Purificacion Quisumbing August 2002 – May 5, 2008	Wilhem D. Soriano January 2003 – May 5, 2008	Dominador N. Calamba II November 2001 – May 5, 2008	Eligio P. Mallari November 2001 – May 5, 2008	Malik G. Marandang November 2001 – January 29. 2004	Gloria Macapagal Arroyo
3rd May 5, 2001 – May 5, 2008	Purificacion Quisumbing August 2002 – May 5, 2008	Wilhem D. Soriano January 2003 – May 5, 2008	Dominador N. Calamba II November 2001 – May 5, 2008	Eligio P. Mallari November 2001 – May 5, 2008	Quintin B. Cueto III October 2004 – May 5, 2008	Gloria Macapagal Arroyo
4th May 5, 2008 – May 5, 2015	Leila de Lima (Note: Left office after appointment as Secretary of Justice) May 19, 2008 – June 30, 2010	Cecilia Rachel V. Quisumbing (Note: Dismissed from office by the Ombudsman) May 19, 2008 – October 1, 2014	Victoria V. Cardona June 18, 2008 – May 6, 2015	Norberto Dela Cruz 2008 – May 6, 2015	Jose Manuel S. Mamauag April 22, 2009 – May 6, 2015	Gloria Macapagal Arroyo
4th May 5, 2008 – May 5, 2015	Etta Rosales September 1, 2010 – May 6, 2015	Cecilia Rachel V. Quisumbing May 19, 2008 – October 1, 2014	Victoria V. Cardona June 18, 2008 – May 6, 2015	Norberto Dela Cruz 2008 – May 6, 2015	Jose Manuel S. Mamauag April 22, 2009 – May 6, 2015	Benigno Aquino III
5th May 5, 2015 – May 5, 2022	Chito Gascon June 18, 2015 – October 9, 2021	Leah Tanodra-Armamento June 18, 2015 – February 14, 2022	Karen Lucia Dumpit June 18, 2015 – May 5, 2022	Gwendolyn Pimentel-Gana June 18, 2015 – May 5, 2022	Roberto Eugenio Cadiz July 4, 2015 – May 5, 2022	Benigno Aquino III
5th May 5, 2015 – May 5, 2022	Leah Tanodra-Armamento February 14 – May 5, 2022	—	Karen Lucia Dumpit June 18, 2015 – May 5, 2022	Gwendolyn Pimentel-Gana June 18, 2015 – May 5, 2022	Roberto Eugenio Cadiz July 4, 2015 – May 5, 2022	Rodrigo Duterte
6th May 5, 2022 – May 5, 2029	Richard Palpal-latoc September 15, 2022 – present	Beda Angeles Epres September 27, 2022 – present	Faydah Maniri Dumarpa December 28, 2022 – present	Monina Arevalo Zenarosa March 23, 2023 – present	Maria Amifaith Fider Reyes November 16, 2024-present	Bongbong Marcos

== Controversies ==
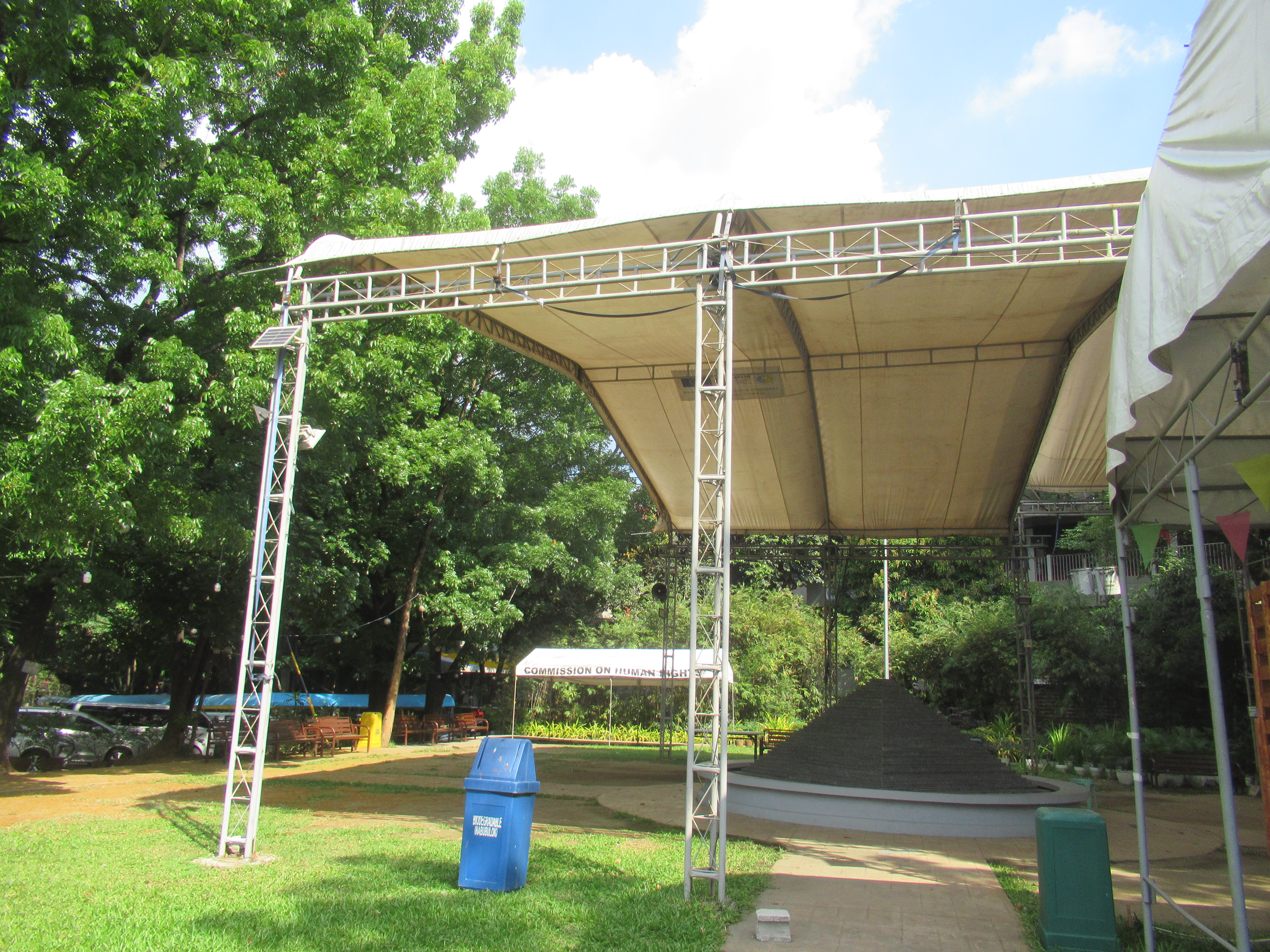
Liwasang Diokno (freedom park)

=== Tenure of chairperson and commissioners ===
In a press briefing on July 27, 2017, Presidential Spokesperson Ernesto Abella claimed that the CHR Chairperson and its commissioners "serve at the pleasure of the president" and that they may be replaced at the President's pleasure. This claim was based on the Executive Order No. 163-A (issued during the presidency of Corazon Aquino in 1987) that amended the Section 2, Sub-Paragraph (c of Executive Order No.163, stating that "The Chairperson and Members of the Commission on Human Rights shall be appointed by the President. Their tenure in office shall be at the pleasure of the President."

However, the said executive order was questioned in the Supreme Court in the case: Bautista v. Salonga, G.R. No. 86439 on April 13, 1989; leading to the declaration of the said executive order as unconstitutional. Taking a quote from the said Supreme Court ruling, "Indeed, the Court finds it extremely difficult to conceptualize how an office conceived and created by the Constitution to be independent as the Commission on Human Rights-and vested with the delicate and vital functions of investigating violations of human rights, pinpointing responsibility and recommending sanctions as well as remedial measures therefor, can truly function with independence and effectiveness, when the tenure in office of its Chairperson and Members is made dependent on the pleasure of the President. Executive Order No. 163-A, being antithetical to the constitutional mandate of independence for the Commission on Human Rights has to be declared unconstitutional."

=== CHR as a constitutional commission ===
Under the Article IX of the 1987 Constitution, three constitutional commissions were established namely: the Commission on Elections (COMELEC), the Civil Service Commission (CSC), and the Commission on Audit (COA). The Commission on Human Rights (CHR), on the other hand, was created under the Article XIII, Section 17 of the 1987 constitution and the Administrative Code of 1987.

In a Resolution of the Supreme Court contained in Commission on Human Rights Employees Association v. Commission on Human Rights, G.R. No. 155336, it ruled that the CHR is a .."From the 1987 Constitution and the Administrative Code, it is abundantly clear that the CHR is not among the class of Constitutional Commissions. .."

== See also ==
- National human rights institution, similar institutions in other countries
