= Fred Ruiz Castro =

12th Chief Justice of the Philippines (1914–1979)

The Honorable Fred Ruiz Castro
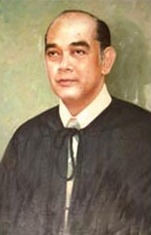

12th Chief Justice of the Supreme Court of the Philippines
- In office January 5, 1976 – April 19, 1979
- Appointed by: Ferdinand Marcos
- Preceded by: Querube Makalintal
- Succeeded by: Enrique Fernando

78th Associate Justice of the Supreme Court of the Philippines
- In office May 29, 1966 – January 5, 1976
- Appointed by: Ferdinand Marcos
- Succeeded by: Vicente Abad Santos

12th Executive Secretary of the Philippines
- In office December 30, 1953 – October 26, 1955
- Appointed by: Ramon Magsaysay
- Preceded by: Marciano Roque
- Succeeded by: Fortunato de Leon

Personal details
- Born: September 2, 1914 Laoag, Ilocos Norte, Philippine Islands
- Died: April 19, 1979 (aged 64) India
- Spouse: Natividad Hizon (m. 1939; died 1957)
- Children: 5
- Education: University of the Philippines

Fred Ruiz Castro (September 2, 1914 – April 19, 1979) was the Chief Justice of the Supreme Court of the Philippines from January 5, 1976, until his death on April 19, 1979, while on an official trip to India.

== Personal life ==
He was born to Dr. Santos Foronda Castro and Engracia Acosta Ruiz at Laoag, Ilocos Norte, the 9th of 13 children. He attended elementary school in his hometown and in Angeles, Pampanga. He finished high school in three years at the University of the Philippines (U.P.) in 1930. Castro then obtained his Associates in Arts from the U.P. College of Liberal Arts in 1932, and LL.B from the U.P. College of Law in 1936, passing the bar examinations the same year. The following year of 1937, he earned a Ph.B in English, cum laude. Justice Castro was a scholar, student, leader, debater, poet, writer, and editor-in-chief of the Philippine Collegian, 1935–1936.

Justice Castro was married to Natividad Hizon. Their children are Fred Ruiz Castro, Jr., Rowena Cristina Benipayo, Carlos Delano Castro, Frieda Teresita Castro (deceased), and Melisande Veronica Poblador (deceased).

=== Quotations from peers ===
"The Judicial, Public Administration and Uniformed services today and all younger Filipinos should derive inspiration from the exemplary life and story of Fred Ruiz Castro." - Fidel V. Ramos, President of the Philippines 1992-1998

"With mingled emotions of joy and sorrow, we present this gavel to you, through your beloved widow with the utmost esteem and respect and with abiding affection and admiration. This gavel will belong to everyone, it will belong to our people; it will belong, as you yourself, belong to the ages." – Ameurfina A. Melencio Herrera, Justice of the Supreme Court 1979 to 1992.

"He was born a leader of men. His decisions were both groundbreaking and decisive…he never let emotion or public sentiment cloud his judicial decisions…an attitude normally expected of a judge, but at that time seems admirable give a martial law regime, when public figures were besieged by all kinds of pressure from the powers-that-be." – Edgardo J. Angara, Senator of the Republic, 1987–1998.

“Chief Justice Fred Ruiz Castro was a consummate patriot. He loved his country, fought for its freedom, upheld its laws and wrote poems about his extraordinary experiences. Truly, he is a person worthy of emulation.” – Adolfo S. Azcuna, Justice of the Supreme Court, 2002–2009.

“I passed the bar examination practically the same time Justice Castro assumed the post as Chief Justice…this can compare to the elation of a priest who has been ordained at the time of a great Pope…Here was a man renowned for his nationalism…A man lives forever when we remember him.” – Roberto P. Laurel, President of the Lyceum Philippines.

“Chief Justice Castro was truly a legal luminary of the High Court without whom the current state of the legal profession would not be the same. Indeed the Philippine Legal Profession was blessed and fortunate to have been under the leadership of such a learned and insightful man.” – Teodoro D. Regala, Sr.

== Judicial career ==
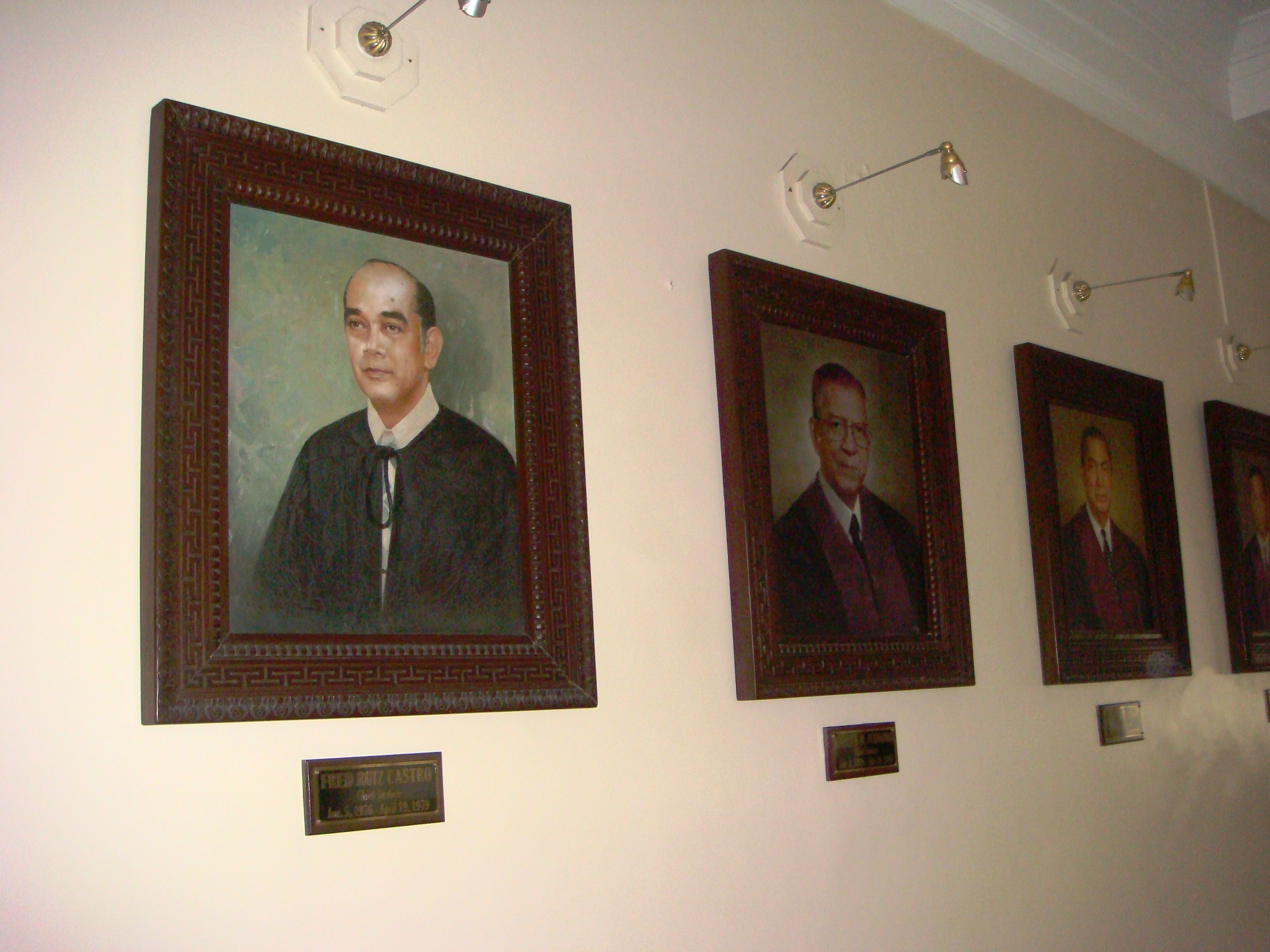
Official portrait of CJ Fred Ruiz Castro and other Chief Justices, SC building

Castro was Judge Advocate General of the Armed Forces of the Philippines, and in this capacity oversaw the Philippine War Crimes Trials from 1947 to 1949 against Japanese war criminals interred in the country. He was appointed Executive Secretary by President Ramon Magsaysay in 1954. He became an Associate Justice for the Court of appeals from 1956-1966 until he became Associate Justice of the Supreme Court on May 29, 1966.

== Achievements ==
Castro was considered one of the advocates for the integration of the Philippine Bar, paving the way for the establishment of the Integrated Bar of the Philippines in the 1970s. He is also behind the creation of the Supreme Court Reports Annotated, which is currently the voluminous source of decisions of the Supreme Court used by practitioners and law students.

== The Martial Law years ==
Castro, together with Justice Querube Makalintal, was the ‘swing vote’ in the Ratification Cases which upheld the 1973 Constitution, which paved the way of extending Marcos’ regime. When the question of whether the petitioners are entitled to relief, the two justices answered ‘No’, thus upholding the 1973 Constitution and made legitimate the rule of Marcos and his power.

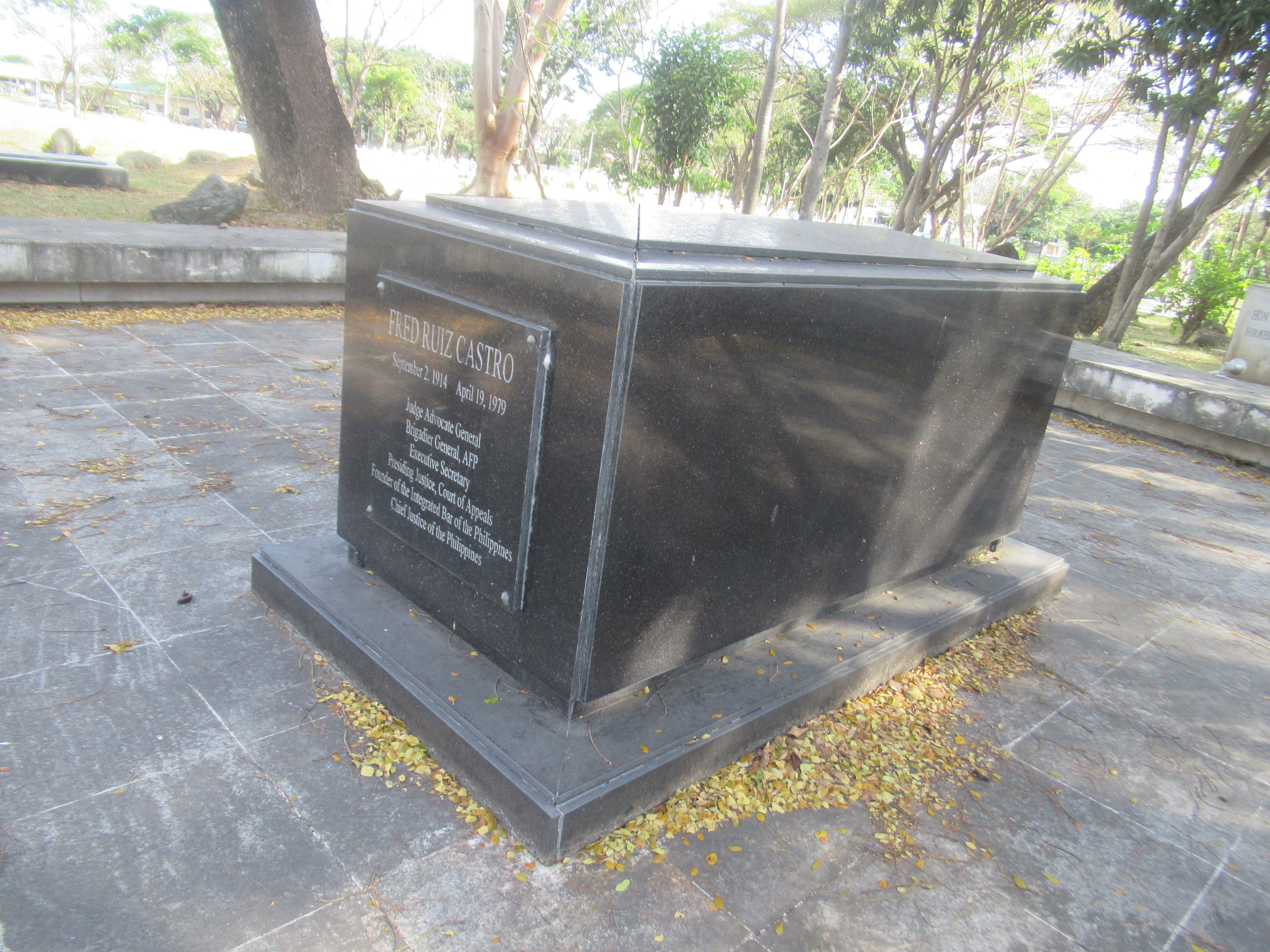
Castro's grave at the Libingan ng mga Bayani.

Castro approved of the Martial Law years, as reflected in his decisions / opinions and public statements. In one of the cases involving the writ of habeas corpus of Marcos critic Benigno Aquino Jr., he said, in a concurring opinion, that the declaration of Martial Law automatically suspends the application of the said writ, thus effectively depriving the former senator of such privilege.

In a speech to the 8th World Peace Through Law Conference held in Manila, Castro proclaimed:

“Martial law is known to the west as the drastic solution to a violent situation... In the Philippines, this primary purpose remains, but it has been enlarged to embrace also the extirpation of the ills and conditions which spawned the riot, the anarchy and the rebellion!”

Political offices
Preceded by Marciano Roque	Executive Secretary; 1953–1955	Succeeded by Fortunato de Leon
Legal offices
Preceded by Querube Makalintal	Chief Justice of the Supreme Court of the Philippines; 1976–1979	Succeeded by Enrique Fernando
