= Zordan =

Zordan is an Italian surname. Notable people with the surname include:

- Andrea Zordan (born 1992), Italian racing cyclist
- Luca Zordan, Italian photographer

== See also ==
- Zoran
- Zordon, a fictional character from the Power Rangers franchise
