= Vicente Magsaysay =

Filipino politician (1940–2020)

The Honorable Vicente Magsaysay
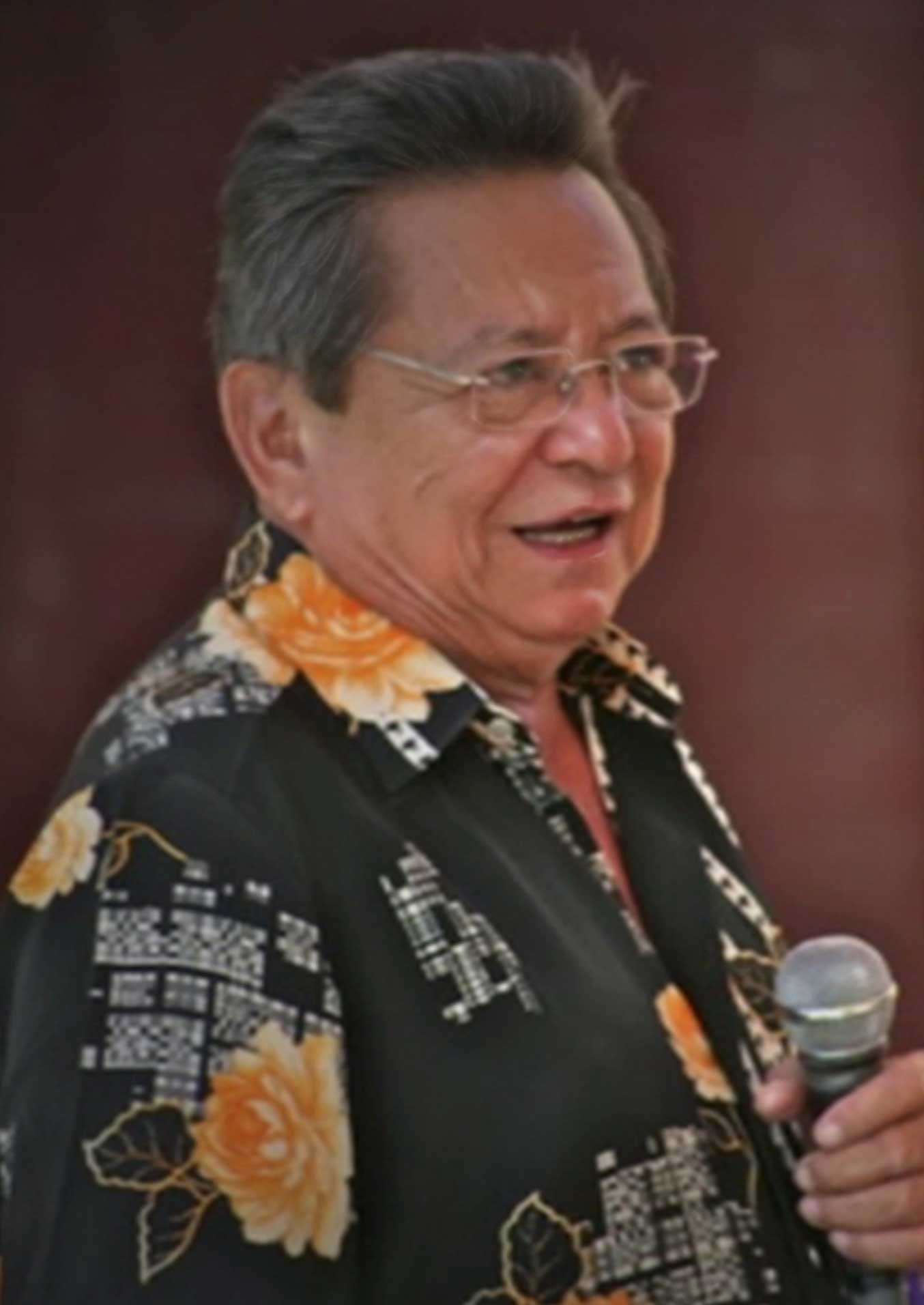

16th Governor of Zambales
- In office June 30, 1998 – June 30, 2007
- Vice Governor: Cheryl Deloso (1998–2001); Ramon Lacbain II (2001–2007)
- Preceded by: Saturnino Bactad
- Succeeded by: Amor Deloso
- In office 1978–1986
- Preceded by: Jacobo F. Battad
- Succeeded by: Amor Deloso
- In office December 30, 1967 – 1978
- Vice Governor: Antonio Diaz (1967–1969); Tiburcio Edaño Jr. (1969–1978)
- Preceded by: Manuel Barretto
- Succeeded by: Jacobo F. Battad

Personal details
- Born: Vicente Pulido Magsaysay; January 20, 1940 Castillejos, Commonwealth of the Philippines
- Died: April 13, 2020 (aged 80)
- Party: Liberal (2015–2020)
- Other political affiliations: Lakas (1998–2015); KBL (1978–1998); Nacionalista (1967–1978)
- Spouse: Rosellyn Enciso (died 2014)

Vicente Pulido Magsaysay (January 20, 1940 – April 13, 2020) was a Filipino politician who was chairman of the board of the Philippine Postal Savings Bank from January 22, 2009 until his death. He was governor of the province of Zambales from 1968 to 1986 and then again from 1998 to 2007.

Magsaysay was the youngest and longest-serving governor in the history of Zambales, serving 27 years in the span of 40 years. He is well known as the running mate of former First Lady Imelda Marcos when she ran for president in the 1992 Philippine presidential election. He brought more than 40,000 jobs to the region as Regional Development Council Chairman in Region 3 during his last set of three terms as Governor assisting the creation of HANJIN Shipyard and in-charge of the fast-tracking of the roads to this as built by the Provincial Government of Zambales.

== Political career ==
Magsaysay was a veteran politician who was the nephew of former President Ramon Magsaysay to his brother Jesus Magsaysay. He first served as the governor of Zambales in 1968–1986, beginning before and lasting throughout the Marcos administration. He lost the post after the People Power Revolution of 1986 that overthrew Ferdinand Marcos.

After losing the vice-presidential race under KBL of former first lady Imelda Marcos in 1992, he won re-election in the 1998 elections as governor of Zambales. He was re-elected in 2001 and 2004. He was the chairman of the board of the Philippine Postal Bank since January 22, 2009.

He accepted the nomination of Lakas–CMD to run in the May 14, 2007 midterm elections under the Team Unity umbrella. His name wasn't mentioned in any previous surveys before being selected on February 10, 2007.

He built the Jesus F. Magsaysay High School or Castillejos National High School in Castillejos, Zambales.

=== Personal life ===
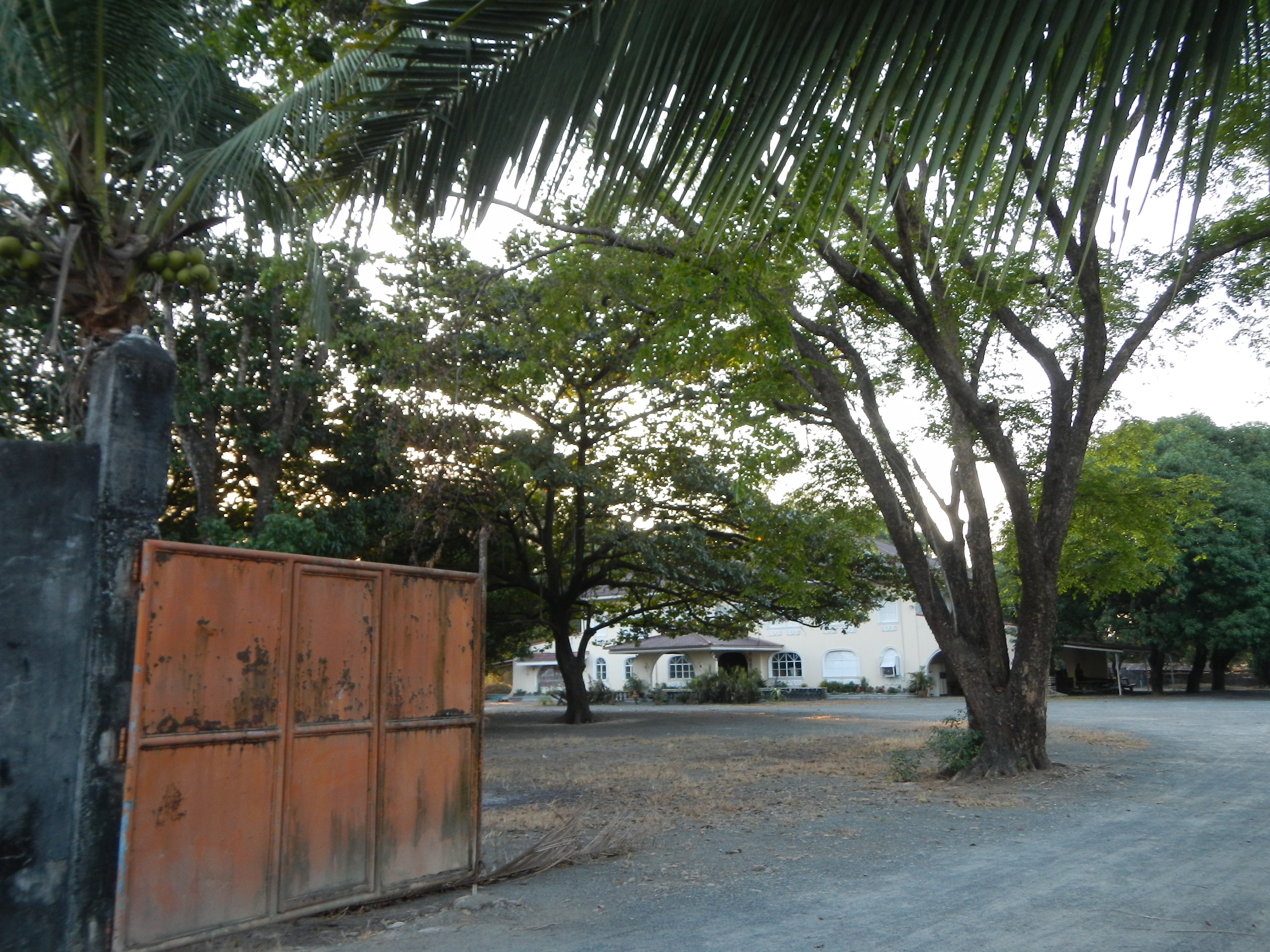
Ancestral house of Governor Vicente Magsaysay (Castillejos, Zambales)

GoVic or VicMag, as he was called, was married to Rosellyn Enciso (October 30, 1944 — August 9, 2014). His eldest is Honorary Consul Jesus Vicente "JV" E. Magsaysay, next is daughter Angel Magsaysay - Cheng who was elected Vice Governor of Zambales in 2016. His second daughter Mary Rose Magsaysay was appointed Undersecretary of Energy 2009-2010 and was Deputy Executive Director of Cybercrime Investigation and Coordinating Center Assistant Secretary Mary Rose Magsaysay MPA C|CISO C|EH was former Director IV of the same up to June 30, 2025 and previous to that was HTC-Highly Technical Consultant of DICT and before that, trustee of the Cultural Center of the Philippines, and previously Special Fintech Consultant of CEZA. GOVICs daughter-in-law is a former Zambales first district Rep. Milagros "Mitos" Habana-Magsaysay is married to his eldest son Honorary Consul of PNG to the Philippines Jesus "JV" Vicente E. Magsaysay former Board of Director of SBMA for 12 years. The youngest is Victor Magsaysay Other known relatives include Senator Ramon Magsaysay Jr., party-list Rep. Eulogio Magsaysay, and TV personality JB Magsaysay.

He died on April 13, 2020.
