= Jovito Salonga =

President of the Senate of the Philippines from 1987 to 1992

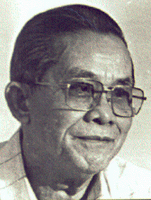

14th President of the Senate of the Philippines
- In office July 27, 1987 – January 18, 1992
- Preceded by: Re-established (Title last held by Gil Puyat)
- Succeeded by: Neptali Gonzales

1st Chairman of the Presidential Commission on Good Government
- In office February 28, 1986 – March 5, 1987
- President: Corazon Aquino
- Succeeded by: Ramon A. Diaz

Senator of the Philippines
- In office June 30, 1987 – June 30, 1992
- In office December 30, 1965 – September 23, 1972

Member of the Philippine House of Representatives from Rizal's 2nd district
- In office December 30, 1961 – December 30, 1965
- Preceded by: Francisco S. Sumulong
- Succeeded by: Frisco R. San Juan

9th President of the Liberal Party
- In office April 20, 1982 – June 1, 1993
- Preceded by: Gerry Roxas
- Succeeded by: Wigberto Tañada

Personal details
- Born: Jovito Reyes Salonga; June 22, 1920 Pasig, Rizal, Philippine Islands
- Died: March 10, 2016 (aged 95) Quezon City, Philippines
- Party: Liberal (1961–2016)
- Spouse: Lydia Busuego (m. 1948; died 2010)
- Children: 5
- Education: University of the Philippines, Manila (LL.B); Harvard University (LL.M); Yale University (SJD)
- Profession: Lawyer; politician

Jovito Reyes Salonga KGCR (Tagalog pronunciation: [hoˈvito sɐˈlɔŋga]; June 22, 1920 – March 10, 2016) also called "Ka Jovy," was a Filipino lawyer and politician, as well as a leading opposition leader during the regime of Ferdinand Marcos from the declaration of martial law in 1972 until the People Power Revolution in 1986, which removed Marcos from power. Salonga was then elected as the 14th president of the Senate of the Philippines and the first one after the new Constitution was just ratified, serving from 1987 up to his retirement from politics in 1992.

Salonga was known as the "Nation's Premier Fiscalizer." He is the only person to top the bar exam and the senatorial race multiple times (with the sole record of three elections garnering the highest number of popular votes in 1965, 1971, and 1987 immediately after People Power).

== Early life and education ==
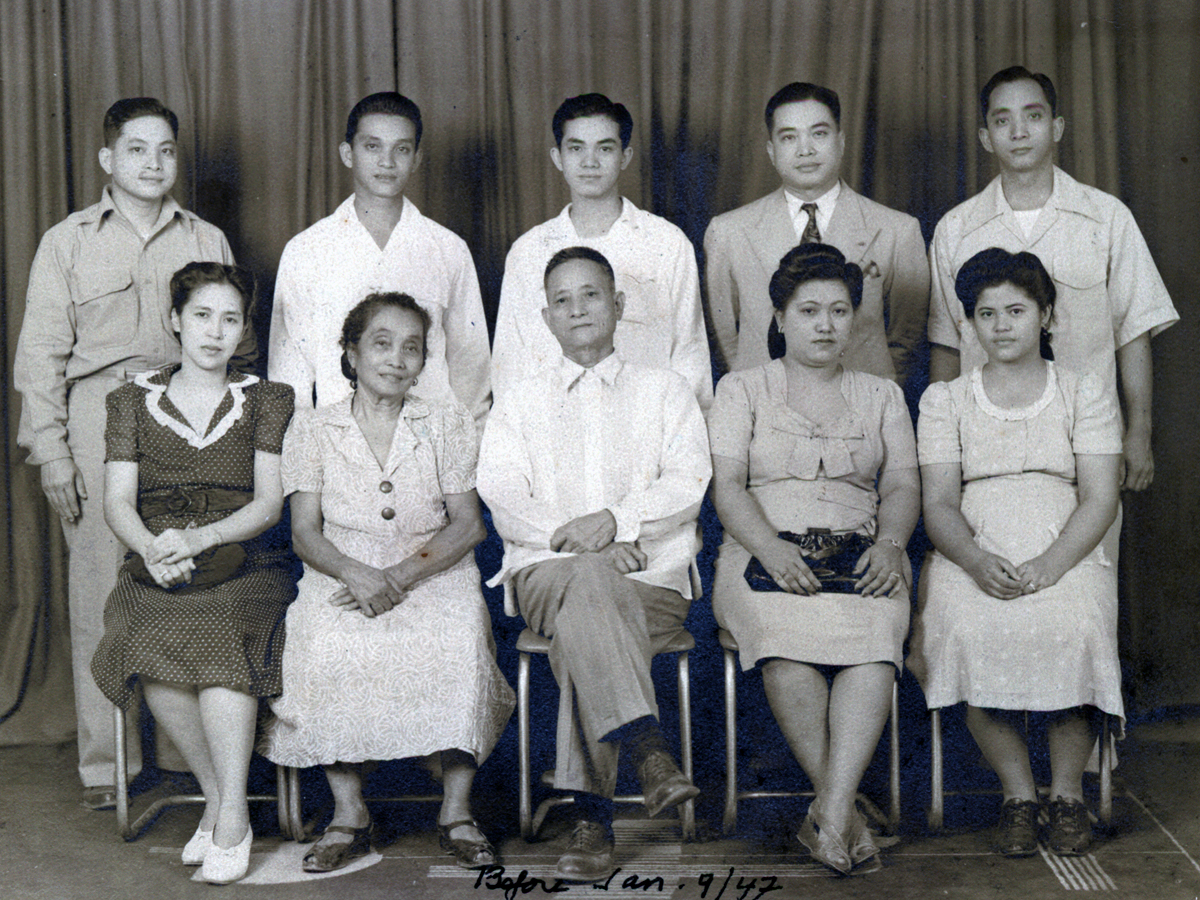
Jovito Salonga's (second row, middle) family photo in 1947

Jovito Salonga was born in poverty in 175 Dr. Pilapil St., Brgy. San Miguel, Pasig on June 22, 1920. His father was a Presbyterian pastor, Esteban Salonga and his mother, Bernardita Dinang Reyes, was a market vendor. His parents married in 1904. Jovito Salonga, the youngest of five brothers, worked his way through college and law school as a proofreader in the publishing firm of his eldest brother, Isayas. He spent time shoe-shining and selling newspapers in the streets of Pasig. Salonga graduated at Pasig Elementary School and Rizal High School, where his bust now resides. During his senior year at the College of Law at the University of the Philippines (U.P.) in Manila, he quit his job to prepare for the bar exam. Due to the beginning of World War II, he postponed taking the Philippine Bar Examination until 1944, when he topped the bar with a then-record grade point average of 95.3%.

=== World War II hero ===
A few months after the Japanese invasion in December 1941, Salonga went underground and engaged in anti-Japanese activities. In April 1942, he was captured and tortured by the Japanese Military Police in Pasig in the presence of his aging father. He was transferred to Fort Santiago and several other prisons where he was subjected to further persecution. On June 11, 1942, he was sentenced to 15 years of hard labor by the Japanese and incarcerated at the New Bilibid Prison in Muntinlupa, but was pardoned on the Foundation Day of Japan (Kigen Setsu) in 1943.

=== American education ===
After passing the bar, he went back to the U.P. College of Law where he earned an LL.B in 1946. He traveled to the U.S. when he won a scholarship to attend Harvard for his master's degree. Recommended by Harvard professor Manley Hudson to Yale Law School, he was awarded a fellowship at Yale University where he earned a Doctor of Juridical Science (SJD) in 1949. He however turned down their offer of a faculty position because he felt he should participate in his country's post-war reconstruction. He was honored with the Ambrose Gherini Prize for writing the best paper in international law. At Yale, he met Jose B. Laurel, son of wartime President Jose P. Laurel, who later became his law partner in the Philippines. In February 1948, he married Lydia Busuego in Cambridge, Massachusetts who gave birth to their first son, Esteban Fernando "Steve" Salonga, among other children. They lived in Valle Verde III Subdivision in Pasig.

Salonga returned to the Philippines to pursue teaching and the practice of law. He authored several books on corporate law and international law, and was appointed Dean of the Far Eastern University Institute of Law in 1956. His student and later associate was future Chief Justice Artemio Panganiban, who said the three finest lawyers in history were Salonga, fellow ally Sen. Diokno, and future Chief Justice Claudio Ong Teehankee. On December 16, 1988, Arizona State University selected him to receive an honorary degree.

Central Philippine University and Silliman University, which were founded by Protestant Americans, conferred him with honorary degrees.

== Political career (1961–1987) ==
=== House of Representatives ===
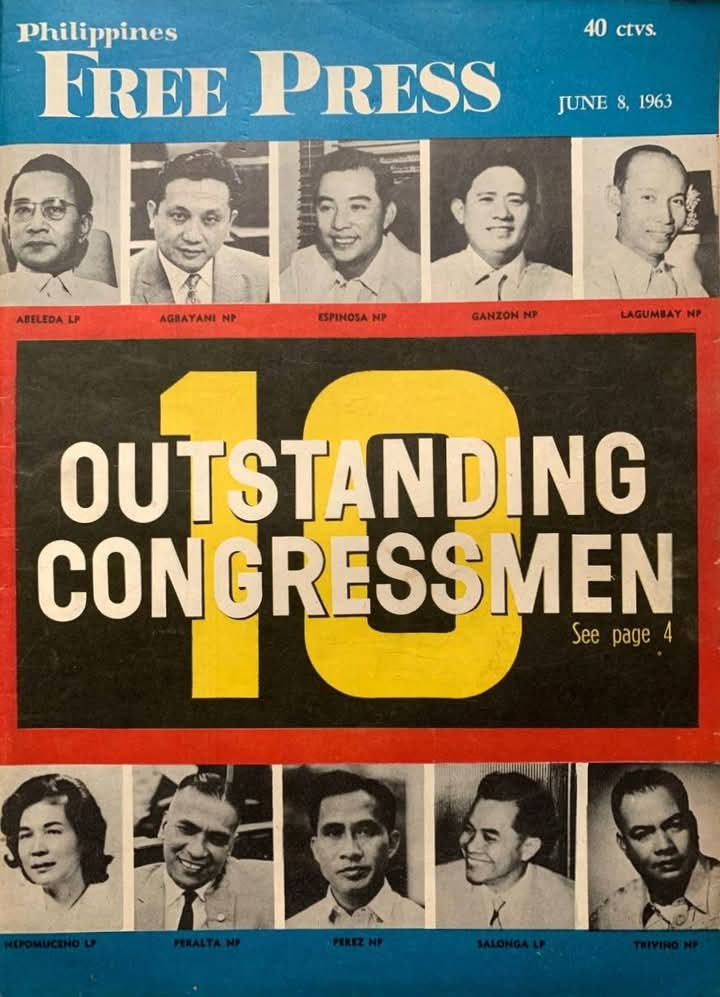
Salonga was one of the 10 outstanding congressmen covered by the Philippines Free Press in 1963

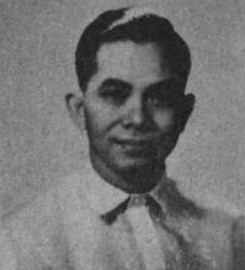
Representative Salonga's official portrait during the 5th Congress.

In 1960, he was persuaded by Vice President Diosdado Macapagal, then president of the Liberal Party (LP), one of the two dominant political parties in the Philippines at the time and party of one of his early heroes founder Manuel Roxas, to run for Congress in the second district of Rizal, where two political dynasties dominated the bureaucracy. Salonga helped build the party from the grassroots, largely with the support of disgruntled young people who responded to the issues he raised, particularly the entrenchment of the political ruling class and their families in seats of governments, a major cause of disenchantment among the masses. In the November 1961 elections, he bested his two opponents by an overwhelming margin.

Shortly after his election, he tangled with one of the best debaters of the opposing party, the Nacionalista Party (NP), on the issue of proportional representation in various committees. He also composed a seminal article, published and editorialized in various papers, on the Philippines' territorial claim to North Borneo (Sabah). With the election of Cornelio Villareal (LP, Capiz) as Speaker of the House, Salonga was appointed to the chairmanship of the prestigious Committee on Good Government and led the committee in conducting inquires in aid of legislation relentlessly about the prevailing graft and corruption in the government and recommended filing of charges against some government officials and employees. In June 1962, President Macapagal filed the Philippine petition against Malaysia's alleged illegal expropriation of North Borneo. Salonga was appointed to head the delegation in the January 1963 London negotiations.

=== Senate ===
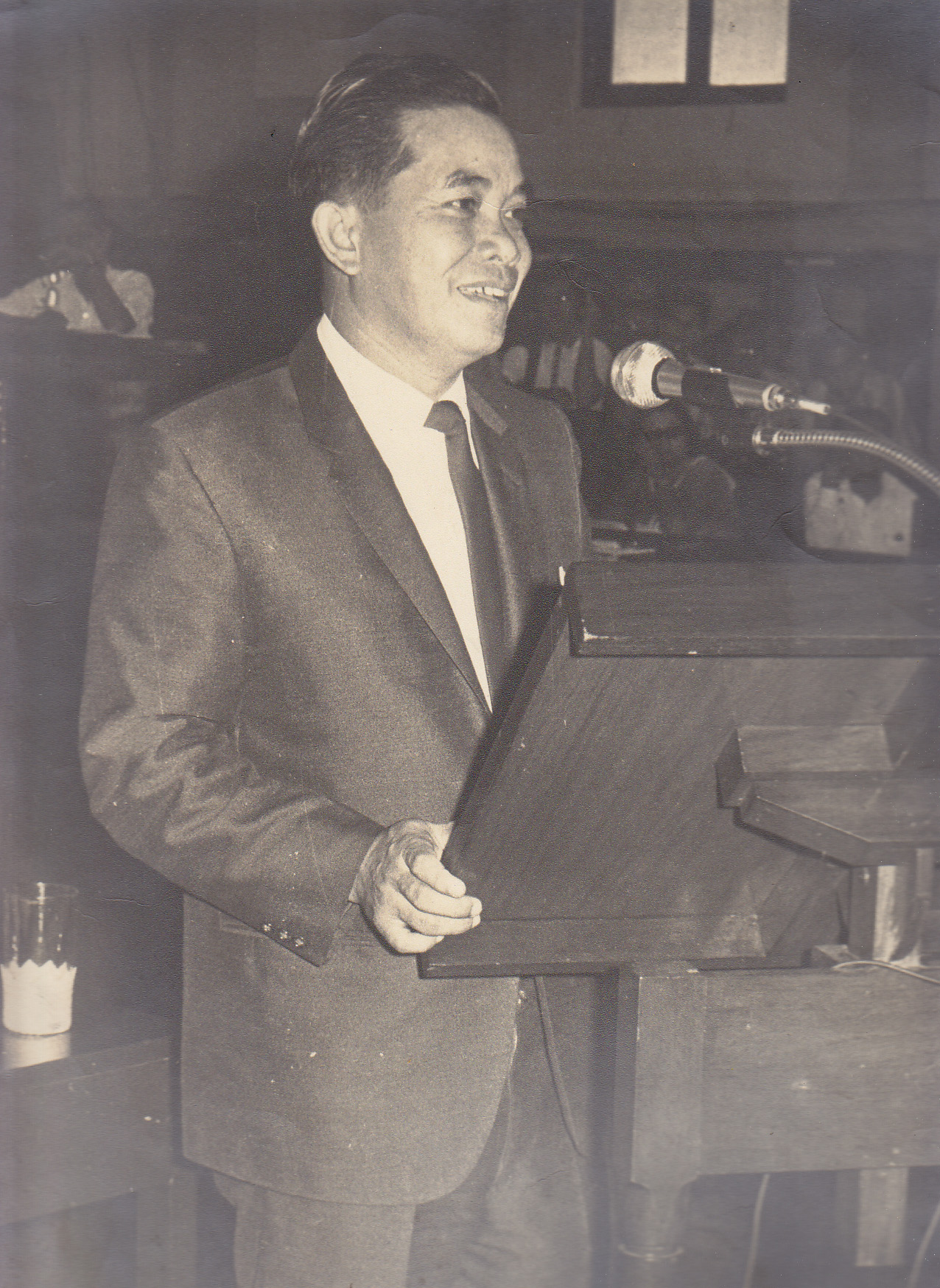
Salonga in 1965

After one term, Salonga was chosen to run for Senate under the LP banner in the 1965 elections. Despite limited financial resources and the victory of NP candidate Marcos as president, Salonga was elected senator, garnering the most votes. In 1967, he was Benigno Aquino Jr.'s chief lawyer in the underage lawsuit filed against the latter by President Marcos. Largely through Salonga's skills in jurisprudence, Aquino won his case before the Commission on Elections. Subsequently, Marcos' appeals to the Supreme Court and Senate Electoral Tribunal were overturned, granting a final victory to Salonga and Aquino. For his well-documented exposés against the Marcos administration, Salonga was hailed as the "Nation's Fiscalizer" by the Philippines Free Press in 1968.

He ran for re-election in 1971. Along with some members of the Liberal Party, he was critically injured on the August 21 bombing of his party's proclamation rally at Plaza Miranda. His doctors' prognoses were grim—he was not expected to live. He survived, however, with impaired eyesight and hearing, and more than a hundred tiny pieces of shrapnel in his body. He topped the senatorial race for the second time.

He returned to the political arena and embarked on a successful law career. He protested martial law and was unjustly arrested. After his release from military custody, he was offered a visiting scholarship at Yale, where he engaged in the revision of his book on international law. He completed his book on the Marcos years, which included a program for a new democratic Philippines.

=== Martial law years ===
The imposition of martial law in September 1972 was the catalyst that radicalized hundreds of oppositionists and the pretext to arrest and imprison many of them, including moderate ones. Salonga openly and vigorously opposed it, and he and his law partners, future Justice Secretary Sedfrey Ordoñez and future Chief Justice Pedro L. Yap, defended many cases of well-known political prisoners as well as obscure detainees, most of them on a pro bono basis.

In October 1980, after the bombing of the Philippine International Convention Center, Marcos again ordered Salonga's arrest; this time he was detained at Fort Bonifacio without any formal charges and investigation. He was allowed to leave with his wife for the U.S. in March 1981, to attend several international conferences and undergo medical procedures. Right after their departure, subversion charges—supposedly a well-known Marcos tactic to scare off his enemies from ever returning—were filed against him. Jovito and Lydia Salonga lived in self-exile in Hawaii, then moved to Encino, California, where he was visited by many opposition leaders, including Ninoy Aquino. It was here where, at the request of LP President Gerry Roxas, Salonga wrote the party's Vision and Program of Government. After Roxas' death in April 1982, Salonga was elected acting president of the Liberal Party. Salonga then became one of the candidates for president against Marcos, competing against the two UNIDO leaders Doy Laurel and Eva Estrada-Kalaw, with all three eventually agreeing to settle with Corazon Aquino as the main candidate, who defeated Marcos in the 1986 election.

=== EDSA People Power ===
The assassination of Benigno "Ninoy" Aquino, Jr. in August 1983 prompted Salonga to return to the Philippines on January 21, 1985, to help resuscitate his party and unite democratic opposition. A month later, the Supreme Court unanimously dismissed subversion charges against him. He was elected president of the Liberal Party.

=== PCGG chairman ===
Shortly after the EDSA Revolution, President Corazon Aquino, Aquino's widow, appointed Salonga Chair of the Presidential Commission on Good Government (PCGG), which was tasked with investigating and recovering the alleged ill-gotten wealth of Marcos and cronies.

As chairman of the Commission on Good Government, he "filed and perfected" the government's claim to the Marcos Swiss deposits through the Swiss lawyers dr. Salvioni, dr. Fontanet and Leuenberger. His unwavering pursuit of the Marcos ill-gotten wealth was, in one senator's words, the "moral equivalent of a war". His efforts were rewarded when the government sequestrated Eduardo Cojuangco, Jr.'s firms including 93% shares of the United Coconut Planters Bank and 27% shares of the San Miguel Corporation.

In 2000, the Swiss federal Court, after 14 years of litigation, decided to forfeit the corrupt Marcos funds received by the Swiss Credit bank in Zurich, and delivered to the nation's government more than US$680,000,000. The commission also petitioned to expropriate several real estate properties and several of the nation's largest corporations that the Philippine government claim were bought through blackmail or money the Marcos family allegedly plundered from the Treasury.

== Senate presidency (1987–1992) ==
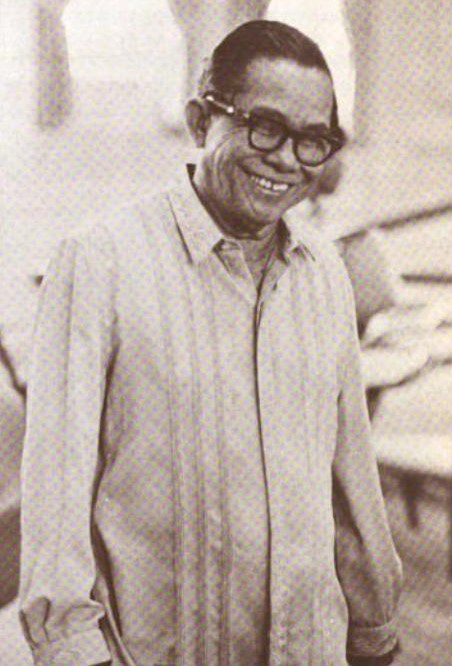
Salonga as a senator, photograph released by the Philippine Congress, c. 1988

After his one-year stint in the PCGG, he was drafted to run for the senate in the 1987 elections. For the third time, he won the number one spot in the senatorial race. He was subsequently elected as Senate President due to his colleagues' respect for his long standing career as lawyer, lawmaker and defender of human rights.

=== Legislation ===
Elected as Senate President by his peers, and as Senator by the people, Salonga authored three major legislative measures: the "Code of Conduct and Ethical Standards for Public Officials and Employees (R.A. 6713)", the "Anti-Coup d'état Act (R.A. 6968)", and the "Anti-Plunder Law (R.A. 7080)". In April 1990, he was conferred a Doctor of Laws degree, honoris causa, by the University of the Philippines for his brilliant career as "an eminent political figure... for his unwavering, courageous stand against injustice, oppression, and dictatorship ... and for his sterling personal qualities of decency, humility, industry and moderation".

Salonga, despite limited means, won three senatorial elections, garnering the largest number of votes under three different administrations: that of Diosdado Macapagal, Ferdinand Marcos and Corazon Aquino. He has successfully legislated the State Scholarship Law, the Disclosure of Interest Act, the Magna Carta for Public School Teachers, the Code of Conduct and Ethical Standards for Public Officials and Employees, and the Act Defining and Penalizing the Crime of Plunder.

=== Rejection of the Phil–U.S. Bases Treaty ===
In September 1991, Salonga personally organized the group of 12 senators called "The Magnificent Twelve" in rejecting the R.P.-U.S. Bases Treaty. Salonga gave the vote that broke the tie stating in his speech that awards did not mean that much to him anymore.

=== Removal as Senate President ===
In December 1991, he was ousted from his position as President of the Senate on the charge that he was using his post to boost his chances of becoming the President of the Philippines in the 1992 election in which he is a candidate, that he was obstructing the priority legislative measures of the Aquino administration, and that he was neglecting the administration the Senate, and was succeeded by Senator Neptali A. Gonzales, Sr. who served as Senate President on January 1, 1992, following a transition of leadership agreement with Salonga. Due to the agreement, Salonga remained as Senate President until December 31, 1991. Incidentally, like Salonga, Senator Gonzales also served as Dean of the Far Eastern University Institute of Law.

=== 1992 presidential election ===
He then launched a bid for the presidency in 1992, running under the Liberal Party with PDP–Laban's Aquilino Pimentel Jr. running for vice president, but he lost finishing sixth in a seven-person race.

== Post-Senate presidency ==
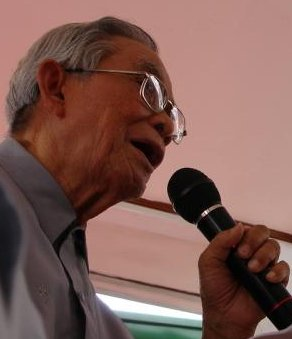
Salonga at a speaking engagement, 2005

=== Activities ===
After his retirement from government service, he continued work in public service through Kilosbayan (People Action), a forum for raising political consciousness and citizens' participation in governance; the Bantayog ng mga Bayani Foundation (Heroes' Memorial), a private entity that honors the nation's martyrs and heroes for their sacrifices during martial law; and Bantay Katarungan (Sentinel of Justice), an organization that seeks to improve the administration of justice in the Philippines through the systematic monitoring of courts and quasi-judicial agencies by selected students from leading law schools.

On September 14, 2007, Salonga resigned as member of a minor fraternity in the University of the Philippines, Diliman. They are the so-called Sigma Rho fraternity. Salonga resigned after their crime and implication in the hazing death of University of the Philippines, Diliman student, 20-year-old Cris Mendez. Salonga joined Sigma Rho in the 1940s. Salonga stated the reason for his resignation to be "because of recent events in which Sigma Rho has been involved." The NBI issued subpoenas to the Sigma Rho fraternity, but none of its members admitted responsibility for the brutal murder or shed light on the truth. Mendez suffered "bruises all over his body, particularly on the back of his arms and thighs." On September 17, 2007, the "Grand Archon Emeritus" (leading alumnus of this Sigma Rho fraternity) attempted to save face by demanding an apology from Salonga over remarks against the fraternity. Their lawyer Tony Meer, a fellow member concocted a rouse to distract the public and stated: "I don't think its fair to us. I think he owes us an apology." The requested apology was never bestowed on them. Meanwhile, the media, historians, and experts, including columnist and Sigma Kappa Pi Alumni President Jarius Bondoc praised Salonga for doing the right thing by rejecting this syndicate.

The Chair of Bantay Katarungan is former Secretary of Justice Sedfrey Ordoñez, who had been Salonga's law partner for over three decades. Salonga was a founder/adviser. Salonga remained active as a speaker, denouncing the moral and social ills in Philippine society. Since ending his political career in 1992, Salonga has been delivering lectures at such eminent universities such as the University of the Philippines, Ateneo, Universidad de Santo Tomas, De La Salle University, and F.E.U. He teaches regularly at the Lyceum of the Philippines where he holds the Jose P. Laurel Chair on Law, Government and Public Policy. He likewise launched the Dr. Jovito Salonga Center for Law and Development at the Silliman University College of Law to pioneer and develop what the law center calls as Transformative Law – "the study and application of law to transform society, shape policies through advocacy, legal education, research, training, and service learning".

Salonga wrote President Gloria Macapagal Arroyo to warn her that the May 14, 2007, elections could turn out to be as "violent and fraudulent" as the Marcos-era polls. In an open letter to Secretary Eduardo Ermita, he stated that he saw Marcos in Arroyo, Ver in Esperon, but was rebuffed. Arroyo rejected the concerns raised in Salonga's letter which mentioned that her decision to call out the military to help stop election violence and killings would make the May 14 polls similar to the violence- and fraud-tainted elections during the Marcos regime.

Salonga branded the government's move to hand back an American citizen accused of rape, to the United States authorities as "a raw deal and a midnight transaction", whose victims were "Nicole" (the rape victim) and the country's justice system. Salonga claimed that a raw deal was done against "Nicole" and the judicial process by Judge Benjamin Pozon and the Court of Appeals under pressure from George W. Bush's government.

Senator Joker P. Arroyo paid him the highest tribute when he said: "Some people make history, others write it. But there is a rare handful who, in writing-and in speaking-make history. These are the ones who illuminate the issues, and in so doing move men to answer them with noble actions ... In our country there was Claro M. Recto. But if you consider the wealth of historical events surrounding a particular personality who shaped and even generated these events by his words, Jovito Salonga stands virtually alone."

On August 15, 2007, Salonga's book Not by Power or Wealth Alone was published.

On August 24, 2007, Salonga's Bantayog ng mga Bayani Foundation launched a commemorative 200-page book, Bantayog ng mga Bayani (Monument of Heroes) at the Bantayog Memorial Center on Quezon Avenue corner EDSA to honor heroes, 160 Filipino student and community activists, priests, nuns, journalists, lawyers, Supreme Court justices and an Italian priest Tulio Favali, who was murdered in 1985 by a military-backed fanatic cult.

=== Honors and recognition ===
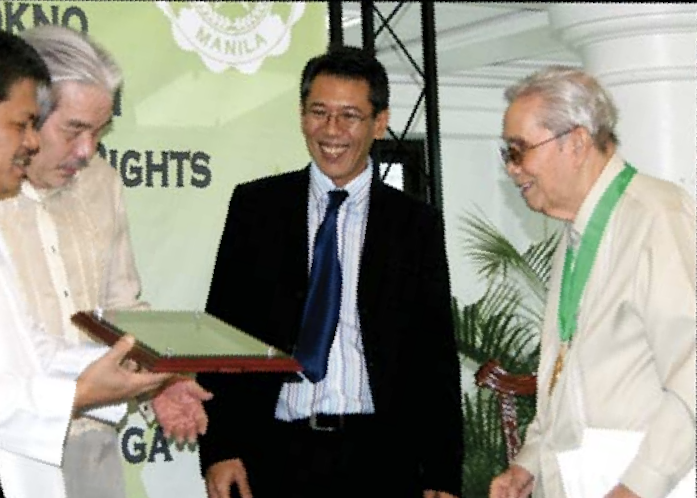
Jovito Salonga receives the 2010 Ka Pepe Diokno Human Rights Award.

Salonga received the Ramon Magsaysay Award for government service on August 31, 2007. He was honored for "the exemplary integrity and substance of his long public career in service to democracy and good government in the Philippines". Other awardees included Kim Sun Tae of Korea, Mahabir Pun of Nepal, Tang Xiyang of China, Palagummi Sainath of India, Chen Guangcheng and Chung To, both of China. At least 256 Asian people have won the award in various categories since its founding in 1957. Each awardee receives a certificate, a medallion and an undisclosed cash prize. Salonga was one of the 7 Asian awardees, from China, India, South Korea, Nepal and the Philippines. He also received the prestigious Ka Pepe Diokno Human Rights Award, the premier national human rights award on February 26, 2010. Jovito Salonga was also conferred the Order of the Knights of Rizal with the highest rank, Knight Grand Cross of Rizal (KGCR).

== Personal life ==
Salonga met Lydia Busuego, a former editor-in-chief of a collegiate newspaper publication, in 1947, and got married on Valentine's Day, February 14, 1948. The couple have five children: Patricia, Victoria Regina, Ricardo, Esteban Fernando, and Eduardo. Lydia died on April 19, 2010, at the age of 88.

== Final years and legacy ==
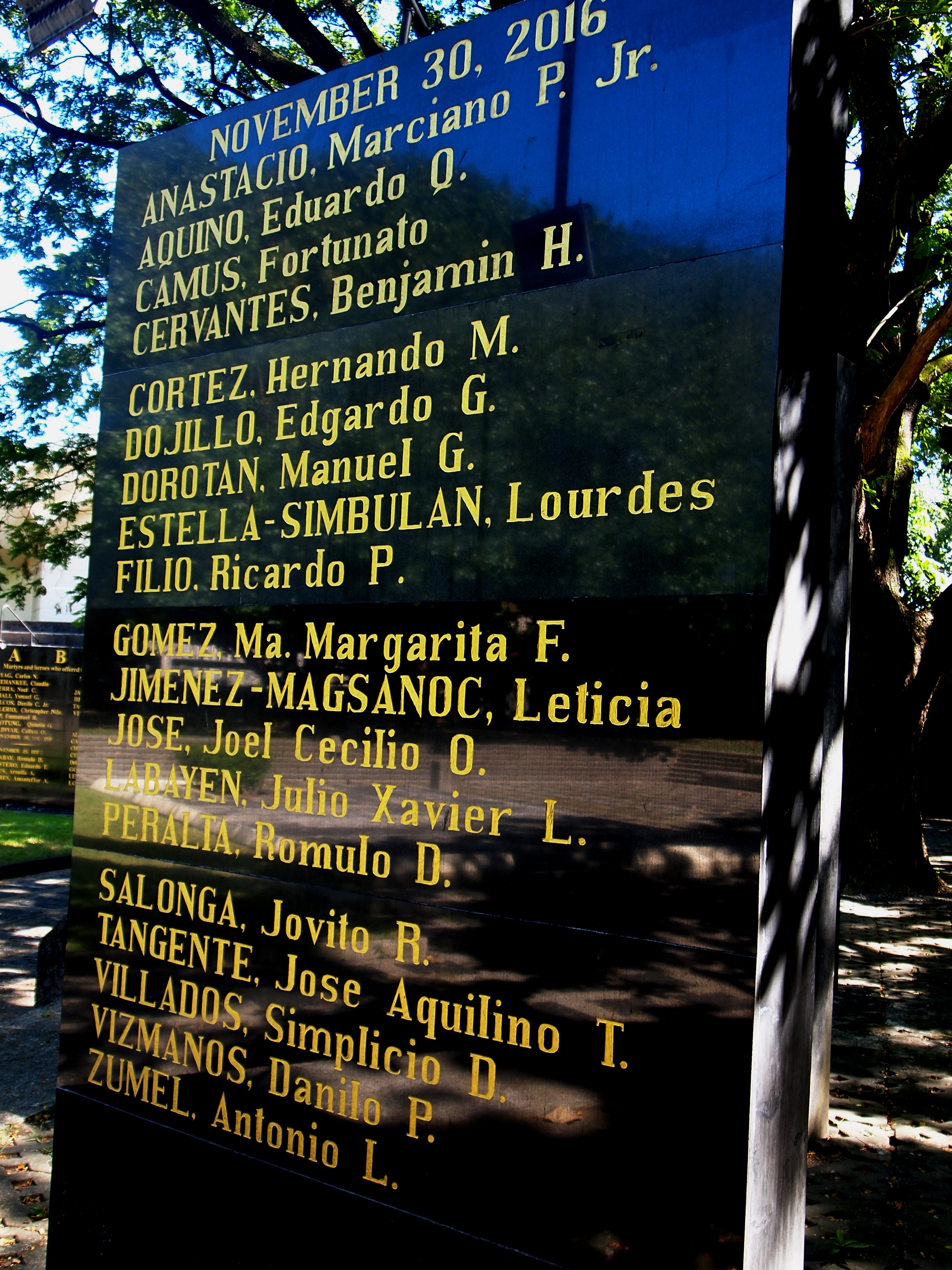
Detail of the Wall of Remembrance at the Bantayog ng mga Bayani, showing names from the 2016 batch of Bantayog honorees, including that of Jovito Salonga.

Salonga died on March 10, 2016, due to cardiac arrest at the Philippine Heart Center in Quezon City.

Salonga has been called by his nephew Rene Saguisag (Saguisag used to call him Uncle Jovy though Salonga is actually the second cousin once removed of Saguisag, as his paternal grandmother Talia Saguisag is the first cousin of Salonga's mother Dinang Reyes) as the finest statesman or the best president we never had, while Joker Arroyo called him the most important historical figure who influenced the nation by his words alone. Bantayog ng mga Bayani renamed its main building in its compound as the Sen. Jovito R. Salonga Building. It houses the museum, amphitheater, and the office. While Silliman University's law school houses the Dr. Jovito R. Salonga Center for Law and Development.

Subic Naval Base has the Inang Laya Monument which shows plaques that feature handprints of the twelve senators who voted to end the military bases agreement, with Salonga's famous speech that broke the tie included in the plaque, together with a representation of his handprint.

In 2022, Mayor Vico Sotto of Pasig, who called Salonga his biggest hero, named the new building of Salonga's alma mater Pasig Elementary School the Jovito R. Salonga Building. Salonga's statue was unveiled at the Rizal High School quadrangle by Sotto on Salonga's 105th birth anniversary. This was cited by the local government as a means to honor the most esteemed alumnus and Pasig native in Philippine history.

== Electoral history ==
Electoral history of Jovito Salonga
Year	Office	Party	Votes received				Result
Year	Office	Party	Total	%	P.	Swing	Result
1961	Representative (Rizal–2nd)	Liberal	—N/a	—N/a	1st	—N/a	Won
1965	Senator of the Philippines	Liberal	3,629,834	47.70%	1st	—N/a	Won
1971	Senator of the Philippines	Liberal	5,620,272	59.67%	1st	+11.97	Won
1987	Senator of the Philippines	Liberal	12,988,360	57.12%	1st	−2.55	Won
1992	President of the Philippines	Liberal	2,302,124	10.16%	6th	—N/a	Lost

House of Representatives of the Philippines
Preceded by Francisco Sumulong	Representative, 2nd District of Rizal; 1961–1965	Succeeded by Frisco San Juan
Party political offices
Preceded by Gerardo Roxas	President of the Liberal Party; 1982–1993	Succeeded by Wigberto Tañada
Vacant Supported Corazon Aquino (LABAN) Title last held by Sergio Osmeña Jr.	Liberal Party nominee for President of the Philippines; 1992	Succeeded by Alfredo Lim
Political offices
New office	Chairman of the Presidential Commission on Good Government; 1986–1987	Succeeded by Ramon Diaz
Vacant Unicameral Batasang Pambansa Title last held by Gil Puyat	President of the Senate of the Philippines; 1987–1992	Succeeded by Neptali Gonzales
