= Abraham Sarmiento =

Filipino jurist

The Honorable Abraham F. Sarmiento Sr.

119th Associate Justice of the Supreme Court of the Philippines
- In office January 26, 1987 – October 7, 1991
- Appointed by: Corazon Aquino
- Preceded by: Vicente Abad Santos
- Succeeded by: Flerida Ruth Romero

Personal details
- Born: Abraham Florendo Sarmiento; October 8, 1921 Santa Cruz, Ilocos Sur, Philippine Islands
- Died: October 3, 2010 (aged 88) Prague, Czech Republic
- Spouse: Irene Pascual
- Children: 4, including Abraham Jr.
- Education: University of the Philippines Diliman (LL.B.)

Abraham Florendo Sarmiento Sr. (October 8, 1921 – October 3, 2010) was a Filipino jurist who served as an Associate Justice of the Supreme Court of the Philippines from 1987 to 1991. An active figure in the political opposition against the martial law government of President Ferdinand Marcos, he was appointed to the Court by Marcos' successor, President Corazon Aquino.

== Early life and education ==
Sarmiento was born in Santa Cruz, Ilocos Sur. He completed his primary and secondary education in Laoag City, Ilocos Norte, graduating as the valedictorian of his high school class. Upon the Japanese invasion of the Philippines during World War II, Sarmiento joined the USAFFE and the underground guerilla resistance against the Imperial Japanese Army.

After the war, Sarmiento completed his law studies at the University of the Philippines College of Law. He was a member of the Alpha Phi Beta fraternity. Sarmiento earned his Bachelor of Laws degree in 1949. In that year, he authored a biography on the murdered Chief Justice of the Supreme Court of the Philippines, José Abad Santos, entitled Jose Abad Santos: An Apotheosis.

== Professional career ==
Upon his admission to the Philippine Bar, Sarmiento entered into private practice. In the 1950s, he formed a law partnership with Senators Gerardo Roxas and Justiniano Montano, maintaining his partnership with Roxas until 1967, when he established the Abraham F. Sarmiento Law Office.

Sarmiento successfully ran for a seat to the Philippine Constitutional Convention of 1971 as a delegate from Cavite. He was elected vice-president of the convention, which was tasked with the drafting of a new Constitution.

=== Martial law years ===
President Ferdinand Marcos declared martial law in September 1972. During this time, Sarmiento's eldest son, Ditto, was a student at the University of the Philippines. Ditto became the editor-in-chief of the official university newspaper, the Philippine Collegian, and under his leadership, the paper began publishing editorials critical of Marcos and martial law. When Ditto was arrested in 1976, Sarmiento spent months negotiating with government officials to obtain his son's release. Ditto was released after seven months, but died within a year after his health was aggravated by the conditions of his imprisonment.

After the death of his son, Sarmiento was visibly active in human rights and anti-Marcos groups. He co-founded the National Union for Democracy and Freedom, the Philippine Organization for Human Rights, and the National Union for Liberation. He was among the founders of the United Nationalists Democratic Organizations (UNIDO), and served as its secretary-general from 1981 to 1983. From 1985 to 1987, Sarmiento served as the Chief Legal Counsel and Member of the Governing Council of the Lakas ng Bayan (LABAN). It would be under the auspices of UNIDO and LABAN that Corazon Aquino and Salvador Laurel would form their presidential ticket that challenged Marcos in the 1986 presidential elections. Sarmiento was also a member of the executive committee and National Council of the Bagong Alyansang Makabayan (BAYAN) from 1985 to 1987.

In 1979, Sarmiento co-authored a book, The Road Back to Democracy, with former Philippine President Diosdado Macapagal and three others. Later that year, he and Manuel Concordia published a book, Ang Demokrasya sa Pilipinas, which led to their arrest on charges of subversion and inciting to sedition. They were later placed under house arrest.

By 1983, after the assassination of Ninoy Aquino, who was then the secretary general of the Liberal Party, Sarmiento became his successor. As secretary general, Sarmiento boycotted the 1984 Batasang Pambansa (parliamentary) election.

== Appointment to the Supreme Court ==
Upon the assumption to the presidency of Corazon Aquino, following the 1986 People Power Revolution, Sarmiento was appointed to the Board of Directors of San Miguel Corporation, which was then under government sequestration. In January 1987, President Aquino appointed Sarmiento as an associate justice of the Philippine Supreme Court. He would serve on the High Court until he reached the compulsory retirement age of 70 in 1991.

During his stint on the Court, Sarmiento held staunch civil libertarian views. In People v. Nazario, 165 SCRA 186, the Court through Sarmiento acknowledged the void for vagueness rule as able to invalidate criminal statutes. In Pita v. Court of Appeals, G.R. No. 80806, 5 October 1989, 163 SCRA 386, he wrote for the Court that any restraint on the publication of purportedly obscene materials must satisfy the clear and present danger test. In Salaw v. NLRC, G.R. No. 90786, 27 September 1991, 202 SCRA 7, Sarmiento's opinion for the Court held that the dismissal of an employee in the private sector must be attended with procedural due process, a ruling which has since been reversed by the Court. At the same time, in PASE v. Drilon, G.R. No. L-81958, 30 June 1988, 178 SCRA 362, Sarmiento's opinion for the Court upheld as a valid police power measure, the Philippine government's right to temporarily ban the deployment abroad of Filipino domestics and household workers.

At the same time, Sarmiento dissented from the majority in some high-profile cases. In Marcos v. Manglapus, 178 SCRA 760, Sarmiento dissented from the majority which affirmed President Aquino's ban on the re-entry to the Philippines of Ferdinand Marcos. In Umil v. Ramos, 187 SCRA 311, Sarmiento published a strongly worded dissenting opinion to the majority opinion, which had held that there was no need to procure an arrest warrant to detain persons charged with the crimes of rebellion or subversion. Sarmiento invoked the diminution of civil liberties during the Marcos administration, writing:

The apprehensions in question chronicle in my mind the increasing pattern of arrests and detention in the country without the sanction of a judicial decree. Four years ago at "EDSA", and many years before it, although with much fewer of us, we valiantly challenged a dictator and all the evils his regime had stood for: repression of civil liberties and trampling on of human rights. We set up a popular government, restored its honored institutions, and crafted a democratic constitution that rests on the guideposts of peace and freedom. I feel that with this Court's ruling, we have frittered away, by a stroke of the pen, what we had so painstakingly built in four years of democracy, and almost twenty years of struggle against tyranny.

== Later years ==
Since 2002, Sarmiento had served as a member of the Board of Regents of the University of the Philippines. In 2004, he was among the candidates for appointment as President of the University of the Philippines.

However, his membership in the Board of Regents of the University of the Philippines was marked with controversy, when he protested the election of UP-Philippine General Hospital (UP-PGH) Director Jose Gonzalez, by questioning the legality of the vote of Student Regent Charisse Banez because of her pending application for residency, thus questioning her representation in the Board of Regents and finally replacing the PGH Director and ouster of the Student Regent. But according to the records of his appointment by the President of the Republic of the Philippines, his term as Regent is already expired along with the 2 Malacanang Appointees. It is speculated, that his decision to question the status of the Student Regent is politically motivated because the other nominees are close to President Gloria-Macapagal Arroyo and they will continue the private leasing of the Faculty Medical Arts building in the UP-Philippine General Hospital to the Daniel Mercado Medical Center, a private hospital owned by a UP alumnus in Tanauan, Batangas, while Dr. Jose Gonzales wants to revoke the agreement because, it will not benefit the poor patients of the hospital but it will jumpstart commercialization of the UP-PGH. Now, his actions hound his reputation as a Martial Law activist.

Sarmiento was in fact appointed by former President Gloria Macapagal-Arroyo as a Regent until September 29, 2010. However, U.P. President Emerlinda R. Roman renominated him as a U.P. Regent to President Benigno S. Aquino III and this renomination remained pending even as Sarmiento died in Prague, Czech Republic on October 3, 2010. As of the time of his death, therefore, Sarmiento was still a sitting U.P. Regent in a holdover capacity.

=== Death ===
Sarmiento died due to apparent organ failure, while visiting Prague, Czech Republic, was reported in the Philippine media on October 4, 2010.

Preceded by Vicente Abad Santos	Associate Justice of the Supreme Court of the Philippines; 1987–1991	Succeeded by Flerida Ruth Romero
