= Sigma Rho =

Filipino law fraternity

- ΣΡ
- Founded: 1938; 88 years ago University of the Philippines College of Law
- Type: Professional
- Affiliation: Independent
- Status: Active
- Emphasis: Law
- Scope: Local
- Motto: "Seekers of the Right"
- Slogan: For the Sigma Rho, fight!; For the Grand Archon, fight!
- Colors: Maroon, Green, White, and Gold
- Symbol: Fraternity seal
- Chapters: 1
- Headquarters: University of the Philippines Diliman; Diliman, Quezon City; Philippines
- Website: www.upsigmarho.com

The Sigma Rho Fraternity (ΣΡ) is a College of Law-based fraternity in the University of the Philippines Diliman. Having been formally organized in 1938, it is the oldest law-based Greek-letter fraternity in Asia. However, it has also expanded its membership base to include undergraduate students, including those studying for degrees in engineering, business, and sports science. It is one of the three fraternities based in the College of Law, the other two being Alpha Phi Beta and Scintilla Juris.

The Sigma Rho fraternity also expanded its presence independently to University of the Philippines Manila, which began accepting undergraduate students in the 1950s, and to University of the Philippines Los Baños, which was organized in 1957.

== History ==
Sigma Rho was founded by Charter Members Pacifico Agcaoili, Constantino Borja, Rodolpho Frayre, Joaquin Gonzales, Tiburcio V. Hilario, George V. McClure (an American Law student who was the first Grand Archon in 1939), Angel Medina, Carlos Ramos, Luciano Salazar (who later assisted Alexander SyCip in creating the law firm Sycip and Salazar), Antonio Moran Sison, Narceo Zambrano (who was the Grand Archon in 1940).

The Charter Adviser was then professor and later Court of Appeals Justice Magno Gatmaitan.

The fundamental law of the fraternity is that "The word of the Grand Archon is Law". Its hierarchy of loyalty is the following: first is God, second is country, third is family, fourth is the University of the Philippines, fifth is the University of the Philippines College of Law, and sixth is Sigma Rho. Meanwhile, its vows are sacrifice, loyalty, obedience, and service.

== Symbols ==
The two letters of the Greek alphabet are its emblems for the stature of its members as "Seekers of the Right". The Greek initials also stand for the initials of Sanchez Roman, a Spanish jurist whose scholarly commentaries on the Civil Code of Spain were authoritative references used by the students of the UP College of Law.

Members of the fraternity are called "Comrades", while the fraternity’s presiding officer is called "Grand Archon", which means Chief Magistrate in ancient Greece. The treasurer is referred to as the Custodian of Funds.

== Notable members ==
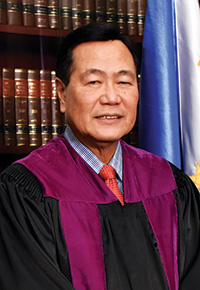
Antonio T. Carpio, Retired Supreme Court Associate Justice

=== Judiciary ===
- Antonio T. Carpio - former associate justice
- Serafin R. Cuevas - former associate justice
- Marcelo Fernan - former chief justice, supreme court and senate president
- Jhosep Lopez - associate justice
- Presbitero Velasco - former associate justice
- Pedro Yap - former chief justice

=== Law ===
- Francisco Chavez - former solicitor general
- Simeon Marcelo - former solicitor general and ombudsman
- Salvador Panelo - former chief presidential legal counsel and spokesperson of Rodrigo Duterte

=== Literature ===
- Stevan Javellana - novelist and author of Without Seeing the Dawn

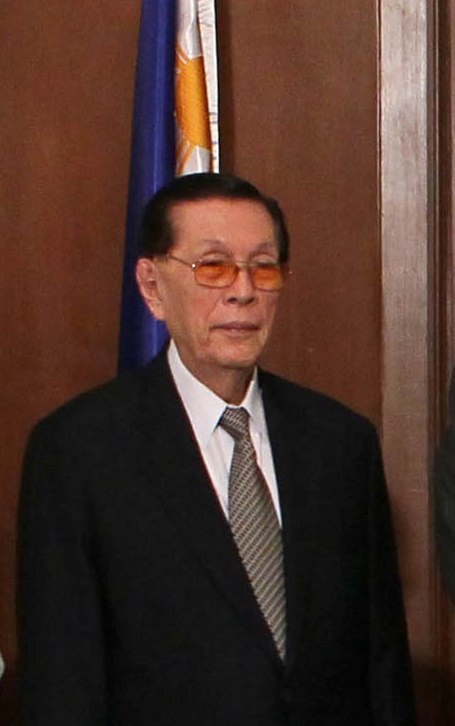
Juan Ponce Enrile, former senate president

=== Politics ===
- Edgardo J. Angara - former senate president
- Juan Edgardo M. Angara - senator
- Hilario Davide III - vice governor of Cebu
- Raul Daza - former representative of the 1st district of Northern Samar
- Arthur Defensor Jr. - governor of Iloilo
- Arthur Defensor Sr. - former governor of Iloilo
- Franklin M. Drilon - senator and former senate president
- Juan Ponce Enrile - former senate president
- Oscar Gozos - former representative of the 4th district of Batangas
- Rafael M. Salas - former executive secretary
- Jovito Salonga - former senate president, resigned from the fraternity in 2007
- Victor Sumulong - former representative of the 2nd district of Antipolo
- Luis Villafuerte - former governor of Camarines Sur

=== Sports ===
- Joe Lipa - former coach of the Philippines men's national basketball team and the University of the Philippines Men's Basketball Team

== Incidents ==
From 1991 to 1994, Sigma Rho was involved in a total of 32 reported violent incidents between fraternities in the UP campus.

In 1994, Sigma Rho member and UP Law student Dennis Venturina died after seven Sigma Rho members were unexpectedly attacked inside the campus by the Scintilla Juris fraternity. While he was brought to the UP Infirmary by bystanders, he eventually died due to severe head injuries inflicted by lead pipes and baseball bats. In 2019, the five UP students convicted for the murder were released from prison.

In 1999, UP student Niño Calinao was shot and killed inside the campus. Investigators suspected that Calinao was caught in the violence between Sigma Rho and Scintilla Juris, being mistaken for a member of the latter fraternity. Calinao was not a member of any fraternity. The same year, several Sigma Rho members were expelled by reason of mauling members of Alpha Phi Beta.

In 2000, several Sigma Rho members killed Den Daniel Reyes, a member of the Alpha Phi Beta, in front of UP Law Center. The Sigma Rho members allegedly took turns in stabbing and hacking Reyes with long knives. In 2008, the three students accused of ganging up on Reyes pleaded not guilty to the homicide charge. The same year, a Sigma Rho member was suspended for two years for possession of deadly weapons in the UP College of Law.

In 2007, graduating UP student Cris Mendez allegedly died during an initiation with Sigma Rho. Former Senator Jovito Salonga resigned as a member of the fraternity because of this incident. Former Senator Juan Ponce Enrile also labeled his fraternity brothers “trainor [sic] of thugs and killers” and urged them to surrender those who are responsible for the death of Mendez. “I am calling on them to initiate the effort to ferret out the people responsible and kick them out of the fraternity and if necessary kick them out of school", Enrile added. In 2016, the Court of Appeals affirmed a decision allowing the preliminary inquiries conducted by the university prosecutor against students who were allegedly involved in the fatal hazing to proceed.

In 2016, Sigma Rho was involved in a fight with Alpha Phi Beta during the UP Law Bar Operations. The next year, the fraternity was again involved in a series of altercations with Alpha Phi Beta for which the two fraternities reportedly kept score of attacks and retaliations.

In 2019, a Sigma Rho member died by suicide after alleged conversations among Sigma Rho members, including photos of hazing rituals, hazing paraphernalia, hazing victims, and hateful content, were leaked online. Several organizations and public figures condemned the fraternity and demanded full accountability, including Delta Lambda Sigma – Sigma Rho's partner sorority. Several members of Sigma Rho were placed under preventive suspension pending formal charges, while the UP administration called on for the public to stop forwarding messages related to the incident and for media personnel to respect the privacy of the deceased's family.

== See also ==
- List of fraternities and sororities in the Philippines
