= Flerida Ruth Pineda-Romero =

Filipino judge (1929–2017)

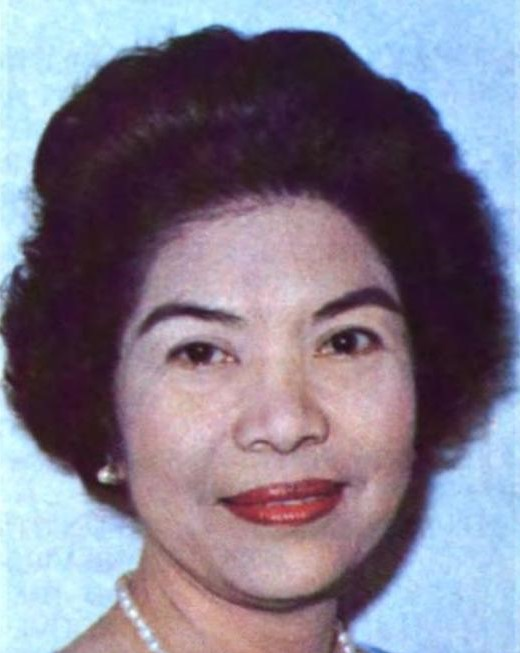
- Pineda-Romero from the Official Directory of the Constitutional Commission, c. 1986

125th Associate Justice of the Supreme Court of the Philippines
- In office October 21, 1991 – August 1, 1999
- Appointed by: Corazon Aquino
- Preceded by: Abraham Sarmiento
- Succeeded by: Sabino R. De Leon Jr.

Personal details
- Born: Flérida Ruth Cruz Pineda; August 1, 1929 Tondo, Manila, Philippine Islands
- Died: December 8, 2017 (aged 88) Manila, Philippines
- Relatives: Nora C. Quebral (cousin)

Flérida Ruth Cruz Pineda-Romero (August 1, 1929 – December 8, 2017) was an Associate Justice of the Supreme Court of the Philippines.

== Early life and education ==
Pineda-Romero was born in Tondo, Manila, the daughter of Pedro Pineda and Juliana de la Cruz. Her father was a lawyer, and her mother was a suffragist and teacher. Romero received a law degree from the University of the Philippines College of Law in 1952, and an LL.M. from the Indiana University Maurer School of Law in 1955. Justice Romero was inducted into the Indiana University School of Law's Academy of Alumni Fellows in 1994. She was awarded an honorary LL.D. by Indiana University in 2000.

== Legal career ==
Pineda-Romero was Director and Dean of the University of the Philippines School of Labor and Industrial Relations from 1962 to 1963. She became known as an expert on the Civil Code of the Philippines and was a long-time professor at the UP College of Law. In 1969, she was one of five professional women from Asian countries to speak at the Assembly of Indiana Church Women United. In 1986, she was secretary-general of the Philippine Constitutional Commission which drafted the new constitution of the Philippines. This commission was in session from June to October 1986.

In 1986, Romero became a Special Assistant to President Corazon Aquino, and in 1991, Aquino appointed her to replace Abraham Sarmiento in the Supreme Court of the Philippines. Romero assumed office on October 21, 1991, and served until her 70th birthday, August 1, 1999, at which time she was required to step down from the court due to the age limit imposed by the Constitution of the Philippines. During her tenure on the court, she served on the panel which began the investigation into the GSIS-Meralco bribery case.

== Personal life ==
Pineda married a fellow lawyer, Orlando Romero. They had two sons. She died in 2017, at the age of 88, in Manila.

Legal offices
Preceded by Abraham Sarmiento	Associate Justice of the Supreme Court; 14 May 1982–13 March 1993	Succeeded by Sabino De Leon Jr.
