= 1992 Philippine presidential election =

12th election of Philippine president

- May 11, 1992
- Turnout: 75.5% (▼3.3pp)
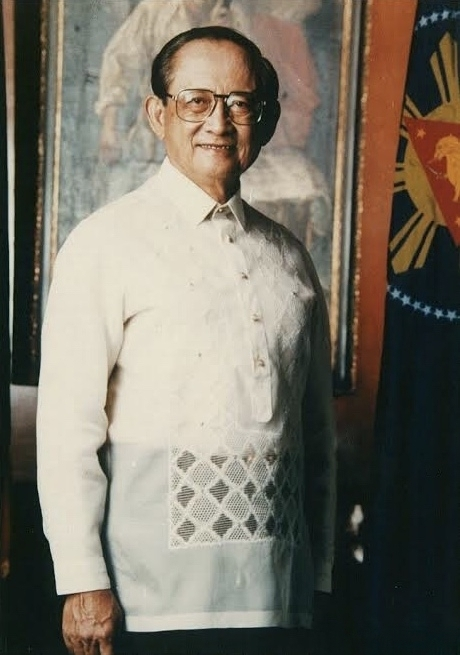

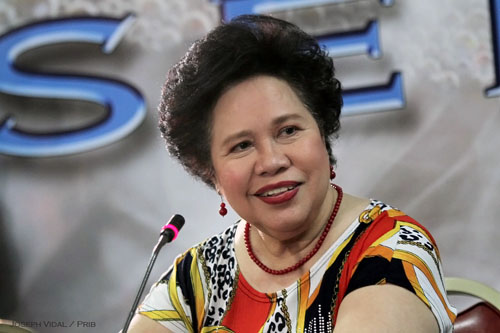

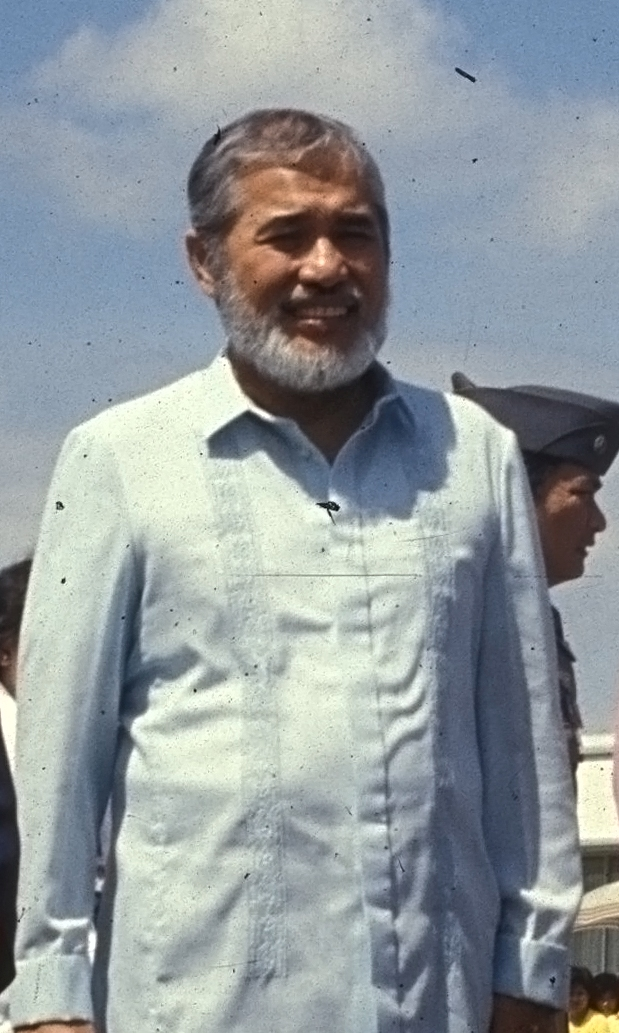

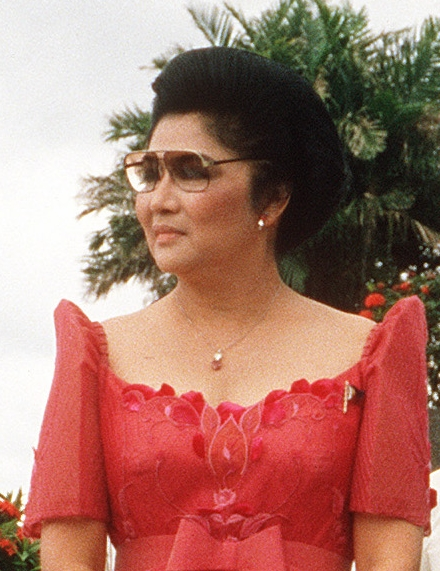

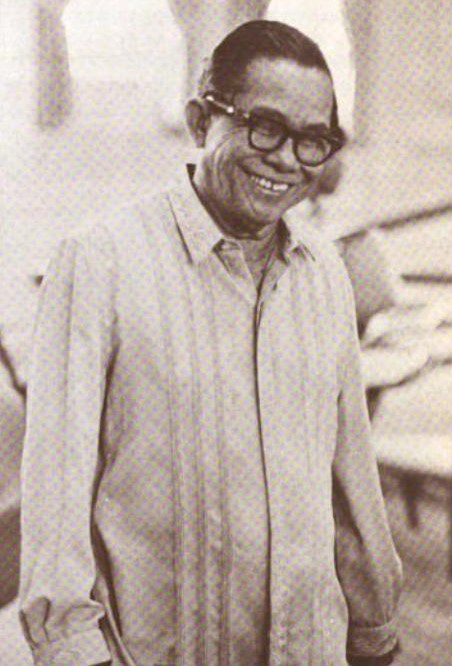
Candidate	Fidel V. Ramos	Miriam Defensor Santiago	Danding Cojuangco
Party	Lakas	PRP	NPC
Running mate	Lito Osmeña	Ramon Magsaysay Jr.	Joseph Estrada
Popular vote	5,342,521	4,468,173	4,116,376
Percentage	23.58%	19.72%	18.17%
Candidate	Ramon Mitra Jr.	Imelda Marcos	Jovito Salonga
Party	LDP	KBL	Liberal
Running mate	Marcelo Fernan	Vicente Magsaysay	Aquilino Pimentel Jr.
Popular vote	3,316,661	2,338,294	2,302,123
Percentage	14.64%	10.32%	10.16%
- Election results per province/city.
President before election
Corazon Aquino
Independent
Elected President
Fidel V. Ramos
Lakas
- 1992 Philippine vice presidential election
- May 11, 1992
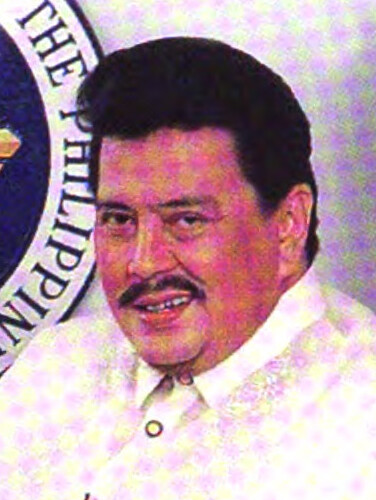

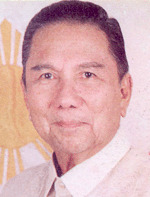

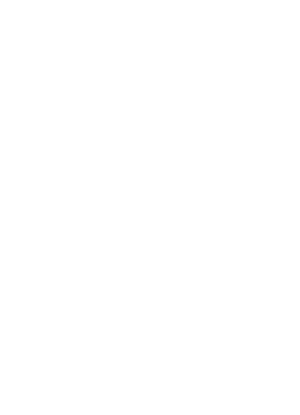

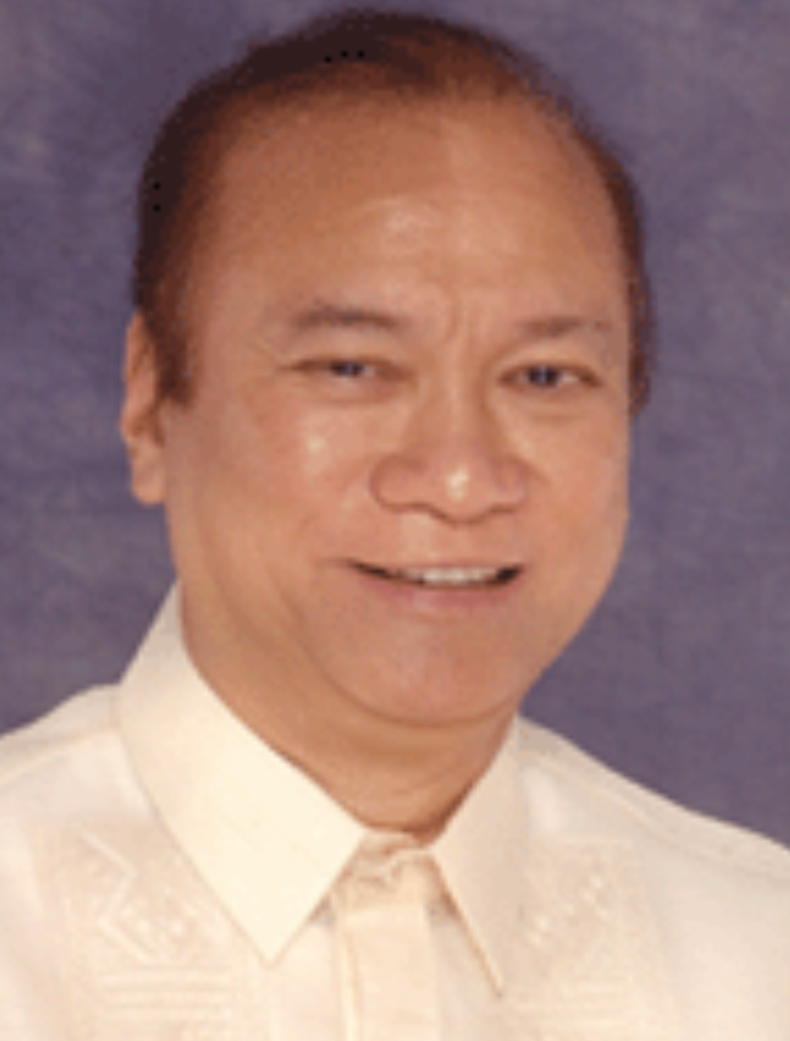

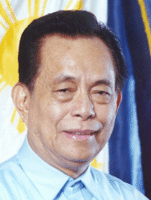

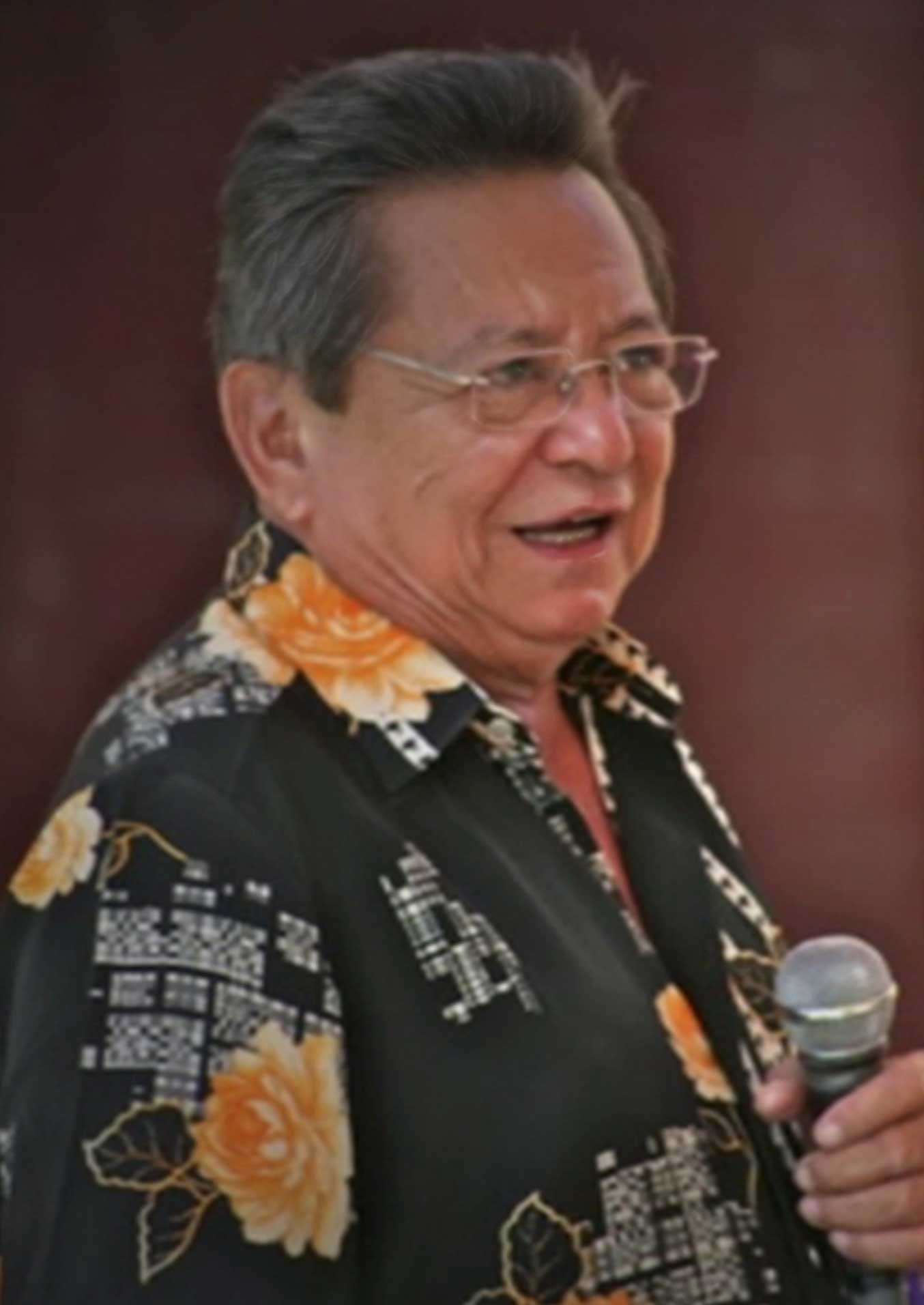
Candidate	Joseph Estrada	Marcelo Fernan	Lito Osmeña
Party	NPC	LDP	Lakas
Popular vote	6,739,738	4,438,494	3,362,467
Percentage	33.01%	21.74%	16.47%
Candidate	Ramon Magsaysay Jr.	Aquilino Pimentel Jr.	Vicente Magsaysay
Party	PRP	PDP–Laban	KBL
Popular vote	2,900,556	2,023,289	699,895
Percentage	14.20%	9.91%	3.43%
- Election results per province/city
Vice President before election
Salvador Laurel
Nacionalista
Elected Vice President
Joseph Estrada
NPC

Presidential and vice presidential elections were held in the Philippines on May 11, 1992. This was the first general election held under the 1987 Constitution and after the EDSA People Power Revolution. An estimated 80,000 candidates ran for 17,000 posts from the presidency down to municipal councilors.

The new constitution limited the president to a single six-year term with no possibility of reelection, even if nonsuccessive. Although some of President Corazon Aquino's advisers suggested that she could run for a second term, as she was sworn in before the 1987 Constitution took effect, Aquino did not run again.

In the presidential election, retired general Fidel Ramos of Lakas–NUCD narrowly defeated populist candidate Miriam Defensor Santiago of the People's Reform Party. Ramos also got the lowest plurality in the Philippine electoral history, and beat the previous election for the closest margin of victory, percentage-wise (this record would later be beaten by the 2004 election).

Santiago led the canvassing of votes for the first five days but then was overtaken by Ramos in a few days. Santiago cried fraud and filed an electoral protest citing power outages as evidence. Various media personnel became witnesses to the fraud made in the election, where the phrase, 'Miriam won in the election, but lost in the counting' became popular. However, her protest was eventually dismissed by the Supreme Court of the Philippines.

The 1992 election was the second time both president and vice president came from different parties. Movie actor and Senator Joseph Estrada, running with presidential candidate Eduardo Cojuanco, won a six-year term as vice-president.

Under the transitory provisions of the Constitution, 24 senators were elected in this election. The first 12 senators who garnered the highest votes would have six-year terms while the next 12 senators would have three-year terms. Laban ng Demokratikong Pilipino (LDP) received a large share in the Senate race. Television personality and Quezon City vice mayor Vicente Sotto III (also known as Tito Sotto) received the highest number of votes.

== Candidates ==
Presidential candidate	Previous position	Party	Vice presidential candidate	Previous position	Party
Danding Cojuangco	Former Member of the House of Representatives from Tarlac's 1st congressional district (1969–1972)	Nationalist People's Coalition	Joseph Estrada	Senator (1987–1992)	Nationalist People's Coalition
Miriam Defensor Santiago	Former Secretary of Agrarian Reform (1989–1990)	People's Reform Party	Ramon Magsaysay Jr.	Former Member of the House of Representatives from Zambales's at-large congressional district (1965–1969)	People's Reform Party
Salvador Laurel	Vice President	Nacionalista Party	Eva Estrada Kalaw	Former Mambabatas Pambansa from Manila (1984–1986)	Nacionalista Party
Imelda Marcos	Former First Lady (1965–1986)	Kilusang Bagong Lipunan	Vicente Magsaysay	Former Governor of Zambales (1978–1986)	Kilusang Bagong Lipunan
Ramon Mitra Jr.	Speaker of the House of Representatives	Laban ng Demokratikong Pilipino	Marcelo Fernan	Former Chief Justice (1988–1991)	Laban ng Demokratikong Pilipino
Fidel V. Ramos	Former Secretary of National Defense (1988–1991)	Lakas–NUCD	Lito Osmeña	Governor of Cebu (1988–1992)	Lakas–NUCD
Jovito Salonga	Former Senate President (1987–1992)	Liberal Party	Nene Pimentel	Senator (1987–1992)	PDP–Laban

== Debates ==
A debate was held between presidential candidates Salvador Laurel and Ramon Mitra Jr. on the ABS-CBN television program Magandang Gabi... Bayan on March 7, 1992. It was considered an especially heated debate between the two candidates, with the Manila Standard noting the "barbs, insults, and witticisms" exchanged during the program.

On March 15, the Commission on Elections (COMELEC) began its series of six presidential and vice-presidential debates held over the next six Sundays, with the first debate held among presidential candidates Fidel V. Ramos, Miriam Defensor-Santiago, and Jovito Salonga, moderated by Dong Puno and broadcast live on GMA Network. Estrada, then a presidential candidate, was scheduled to participate in the debate but had to withdraw due to a prior commitment.

The second COMELEC-sponsored presidential debate was held on March 22 among Laurel, Mitra, and Eduardo Cojuangco Jr., moderated by Puno and broadcast live on RPN. The debate was also broadcast live on radio through the government-owned Radyo ng Bayan, but was interrupted 45 minutes into the debate when the station switched instead to a broadcast of a Lakas-NUCD rally in Dumaguete led by President Aquino.

The first vice-presidential debate as set by COMELEC was held on March 29 among Marcelo Fernan, Ramon Magsaysay Jr., and Vicente Magsaysay, moderated by Mario C. Garcia and broadcast live on the government-owned PTV.

== Results ==
=== For President ===
Candidate	Party	Votes	%
Fidel V. Ramos	Lakas–NUCD	5,342,521	23.58
Miriam Defensor Santiago	People's Reform Party	4,468,173	19.72
Danding Cojuangco	Nationalist People's Coalition	4,116,376	18.17
Ramon Mitra Jr.	Laban ng Demokratikong Pilipino	3,316,661	14.64
Imelda Marcos	Kilusang Bagong Lipunan	2,338,294	10.32
Jovito Salonga	Liberal Party	2,302,124	10.16
Salvador Laurel	Nacionalista Party	770,046	3.40
Total		22,654,195	100.00
Valid votes		22,654,195	93.40
Invalid/blank votes		1,600,759	6.60
Total votes		24,254,954	100.00
Registered voters/turnout		32,141,079	75.46
Source: Nohlen, Grotz, Hartmann, Hasall and Santos

Popular vote
Ramos	23.58%
Defensor Santiago	19.72%
Cojuangco	18.17%
Mitra	14.64%
Marcos	10.32%
Salonga	10.16%
Laurel	3.40%

==== Breakdown ====
Region	Ramos		Santiago		Cojuangco		Mitra		Marcos		Salonga		Laurel	
Region	Votes	%	Votes	%	Votes	%	Votes	%	Votes	%	Votes	%	Votes	%
Ilocos Region	526,653	36.84	74,084	5.18	376,465	26.33	67,009	4.69	355,550	24.87	22,960	1.61	7,006	0.49
Cordillera Administrative Region	76,643	18.10	66,348	15.67	89,441	21.12	76,224	18.00	65,969	15.58	45,133	10.66	3,702	0.87
Cagayan Valley	110,237	13.20	46,378	5.55	282,798	33.87	91,970	11.01	241,125	28.88	56,447	6.76	6,083	0.73
Central Luzon	692,515	27.57	519,769	20.69	754,737	30.05	216,944	8.64	135,022	5.38	178,896	7.12	13,951	0.56
National Capital Region	679,171	20.54	990,288	29.94	572,301	17.30	193,398	5.85	379,846	11.48	438,048	13.24	54,273	1.64
Southern Tagalog	442,563	13.93	579,563	18.24	517,724	16.30	538,869	16.96	173,389	5.46	344,803	10.85	483,262	15.21
Bicol Region	285,370	21.49	177,202	13.35	227,718	17.15	287,970	21.69	21,336	1.61	273,478	20.60	52,275	3.52
Western Visayas	326,701	16.04	1,240,002	60.88	253,649	12.45	134,834	6.62	20,130	0.99	50,954	2.50	10,581	0.52
Central Visayas	618,520	35.25	168,240	9.59	244,732	13.95	545,245	31.07	54,063	3.08	88,068	5.02	35,841	2.04
Eastern Visayas	254,258	22.91	49,021	4.42	87,285	7.86	192,090	17.31	346,121	31.18	173,478	15.63	7,735	0.70
Western Mindanao	225,268	30.18	114,861	15.39	145,368	19.48	150,098	20.11	31,125	4.17	65,781	8.81	13,799	1.85
Northern Mindanao	351,575	27.71	86,290	6.80	169,334	13.35	233,657	18.42	180,130	14.20	228,109	17.98	19,680	1.55
Southern Mindanao	363,059	23.51	192,283	12.45	223,966	14.50	272,978	17.68	231,106	14.97	233,169	15.10	27,512	1.78
Central Mindanao	119,335	20.99	124,506	21.90	74,134	13.04	91,188	16.04	84,547	14.87	82,291	11.65	10,205	1.79
ARMM	152,118	25.31	38,197	6.36	109,470	18.22	224,015	37.28	17,754	2.95	38,009	6.32	21,372	3.56
Absentee voters	1,819	23.19	1,141	14.55	3,201	40.81	172	2.19	1,051	13.40	155	1.98	304	3.88
Total	5,342,521	23.58	4,468,173	19.72	4,116,376	18.17	3,316,661	14.64	2,338,294	10.32	2,302,124	10.16	770,046	3.40

=== For Vice President ===
Candidate	Party	Votes	%
Joseph Estrada	Nationalist People's Coalition	6,739,738	33.01
Marcelo Fernan	Laban ng Demokratikong Pilipino	4,438,494	21.74
Lito Osmeña	Lakas–NUCD	3,362,467	16.47
Ramon Magsaysay Jr.	People's Reform Party	2,900,556	14.20
Nene Pimentel (Note: Running mate of Jovito Salonga (Liberal Party))	PDP–Laban	2,023,289	9.91
Vicente Magsaysay	Kilusang Bagong Lipunan	699,895	3.43
Eva Estrada Kalaw	Nacionalista Party	255,730	1.25
Total		20,420,169	100.00
Valid votes		20,420,169	84.19
Invalid/blank votes		3,834,785	15.81
Total votes		24,254,954	100.00
Registered voters/turnout		32,141,079	75.46
Source: Nohlen, Grotz, Hartmann, Hasall and Santos

Popular vote
Estrada	33.00%
Fernan	21.74%
Osmeña	16.47%
Magsaysay Jr.	14.20%
Pimentel	9.91%
Others	4.68%

== See also ==
- Commission on Elections
- Politics of the Philippines
- Philippine elections
- President of the Philippines
- 9th Congress of the Philippines
- 1992 Philippine general election
