= Alpha Phi Beta =

Filipino law fraternity

- ΑΦΒ
- Founded: October 1939; 87 years ago University of the Philippines College of Law
- Type: Professional
- Affiliation: Independent
- Status: Active
- Emphasis: Law
- Scope: Local
- Motto: "We shall not be saved without Wisdom, for Knowledge is Power, but only Wisdom is Liberty"
- Slogan: Para sa Bayan
- Colors: UP Maroon and UP Forest Green
- Chapters: 1
- Nickname: Association of Philippine Barristers, Abogado Para sa Bayan
- Headquarters: UP College of Law; Quezon City; Philippines
- Website: www.alphaphibeta.org

The Alpha Phi Beta Fraternity (also known as ΑΦΒ, Association of Philippine Barristers, or Abogado Para sa Bayan) is a fraternity based in the University of the Philippines College of Law with no recognized chapters outside University of the Philippines Diliman. The fraternity's membership hails from the College of Law and from pre-law colleges in the campus. 2024 marked the fraternity's 85th Anniversary. It is one of the three fraternities based in the college, the other two being Sigma Rho fraternity and Scintilla Juris.

== History ==
=== Establishment ===
In October 1939, thirteen students of the University of the Philippines Manila founded the Association of Philippine Barristers, later called Alpha Phi Beta, with the supposed goal of controlling key positions in the campus, particularly the Philippine Collegian editorship and the University Student Council presidency. The founders cited the need of the students to mobilize in response to the second election under the 1935 Constitution of the Philippines, President Manuel L. Quezon's plans for a "one-party" government, and the looming threat of a possible war in the pacific.

The Charter Members were:

- Arturo B. Atienza
- Antonio L. Azores
- Benedicto Balderrama
- Renato Constantino
- Macario Cruz
- Bienvenido C. Ejercito
- Florencio B. Florendo
- Adriano R. Garcia
- Elias Lavadia
- Rustico V. Nazareno
- Rosendo J. Nuval
- Francisco Sumulong
- Gerardo Tioseco
- Teodosio V. Valenton
- Manuel Vijungco
- Jose Villacorta
- Manuel Vistan Jr.
- Exequiel M. Zaballero Jr.

Then-professor Ambrosio Padilla was the Charter Adviser of the newly founded fraternity.

By November 1939, the constitution and by-laws of the fraternity were drafted and filed with the University Council Committee on Student Organizations and Activities. Shortly thereafter, the committee granted recognition to the fraternity. Charter member and nationalist-historian Renato Constantino wrote the fraternity motto which would also serve as its guiding philosophy.

During the early years, a weighted grade average of 1.75 was the prime qualification for an invitation into the fraternity. To test the neophytes' commitment to the fraternity's ideals of surrender of individuality to the group's interests and absolute obedience to the majority's decision, they were made to undergo tests of skill and humility.

In contrast with other fraternities' beliefs that severe physical tests ensured fraternal bonds, physical hazing was not encouraged on the belief that those with a low tolerance of pain should not be driven away. Moreover, applicants were not rejected on the basis of not having the social background or financial resources. The fraternity emphasized on recruiting students with a strong middle-class background only. The Charter Members did not come from elitist backgrounds.

=== Post-war ===
After the war, the fraternity was reactivated in the UP College of Law which was re-opened at what was left of the Cancer Institute and the College of Engineering buildings in the Manila campus. Members Adriano Garcia, Arturo Atienza, Renato Constantino, Bienvenido Ejercito, and Benedicto Balderama, who also formed the Board of Editors of the Philippinensian from 1942 to 1946, spearheaded the reactivation. During this time, the fraternity's constitution was amended to allow admission of students still in their pre-law courses to allow the fraternity to expand and recruit members deemed with early potential. Moreover, the scholastic standing rule was relaxed.

During the Marcos administration, many members of the fraternity fought for the cause of democracy, most notable of which is Abraham "Ditto" Sarmiento Jr. who was editor-in-chief of the Philippine Collegian at the time. Another member of the fraternity was the first chairman of the Movement for a Democratic Philippines, an alliance of Kabataang Makabayan and other sectoral national democratic organizations, which was responsible for the First Quarter Storm. A year later, another member of the fraternity led the students in barricading the campus during the Diliman Commune. As one of the older fraternities together with Alpha Phi Omega, Sigma Rho fraternity, and Upsilon Sigma Phi, the fraternity was still perceived as part of the bourgeoisie class by the more radical left. They were also identified with the Marcos Right. Those serving the administration include Gerardo Sicat as National Economic and Development Authority Director-General and concurrent Minister of Economic Planning and Reynato Puno as Deputy Minister of the Ministry of Justice.

Before the end of the millennium, the fraternity produced three bar topnotchers, one student regent, five chairpersons of the University Student Council, 15 councilors of the USC, eight college representatives, one editor-in-chief of the Philippine Collegian, and eight staff members of the Philippine Collegian.

In 2013, President Benigno Aquino III recognized the fraternity for being at the forefront of the UP student movement, praising the fraternity's role in "shaping the future stewards of the University, and in providing a podium for the sonorous voices of the Filipino youth."

From 2016, the fraternity has held the annual Ditto Sarmiento Essay Writing Competition in commemoration of the young campus journalists who died in the fight for press freedom during the martial law era. The competition honors Abraham "Ditto" Sarmiento Jr. who died at the age of 27 shortly after being imprisoned during the Marcos Regime. The nationwide competition is composed of a series of contests that are open to high school and college students.

== Symbols ==
The Greek letters ΑΦΒ were selected for the fraternity's original name, Association of the Philippine Barristers. The fraternity's motto is "We shall not be saved without Wisdom, for Knowledge is Power, but only Wisdom is Liberty". Its colors are UP Maroon and UP Forest Green.

== Controversies ==
Based on police investigations from 1991 to 1994, the fraternity was involved in a total of 24 reported violent incidents (which involve weapons such as clubs, explosives, bladed weapons, among others) between student organizations in the UP Diliman campus.

In 1998, a UP student died following a hazing conducted by members of the fraternity, some of which were later imprisoned.

In 1999, members of the fraternity were mauled by members of Sigma Rho Fraternity. The next year, a member of the fraternity was knifed and killed by members of Sigma Rho in front of the UP Law Center. There was also another reported instance of a rumble with Sigma Rho in the same year.

In 2011, a member of the fraternity was attacked near his house during a series of clashes with the UP Alpha Sigma fraternity. The following year, the two fraternities were involved in another brawl.

In 2013, the fraternity was implicated in a rumble with Beta Sigma.

In 2016, the fraternity was involved in a fight with Sigma Rho Fraternity during the UP Law Bar Operations. In 2017, the fraternity was again involved in a series of altercations with Sigma Rho for which the two fraternities reportedly kept score of attacks and retaliations. The next year, the fraternity was involved in a physical confrontation and car chase with Upsilon Sigma Phi. The latter three fraternities, in addition to Alpha Sigma and Scintilla Juris, are considered to have the longest traditional rivalry in the campus.

== Notable members ==
Members of the Alpha Phi Beta are called "Lords" and its membership is known as the "Roster of Lords". The head of the fraternity is called the "Lord Chancellor".

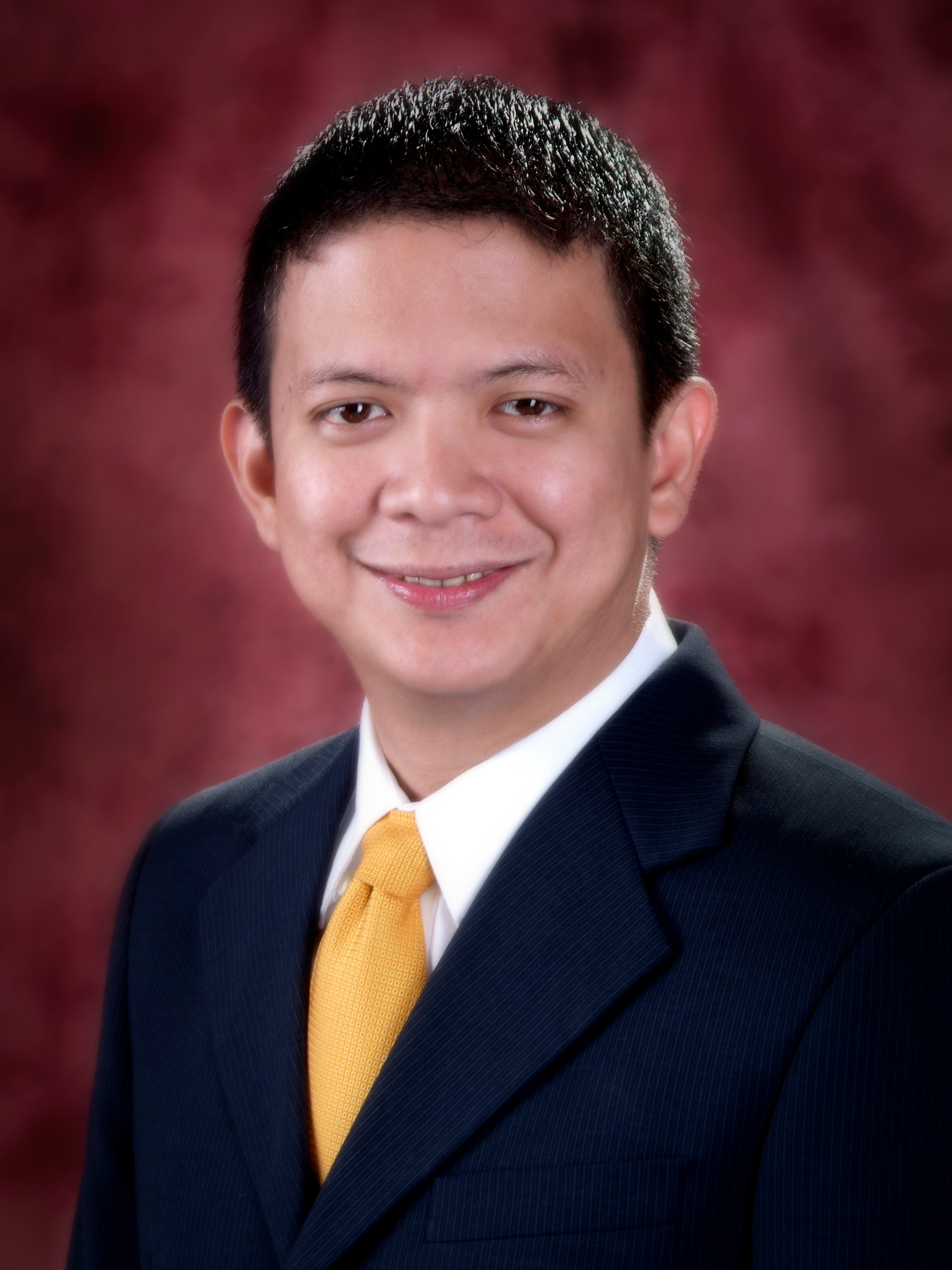
Senator Francis "Chiz" Escudero

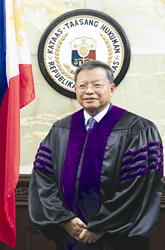
Chief Justice Reynato Puno

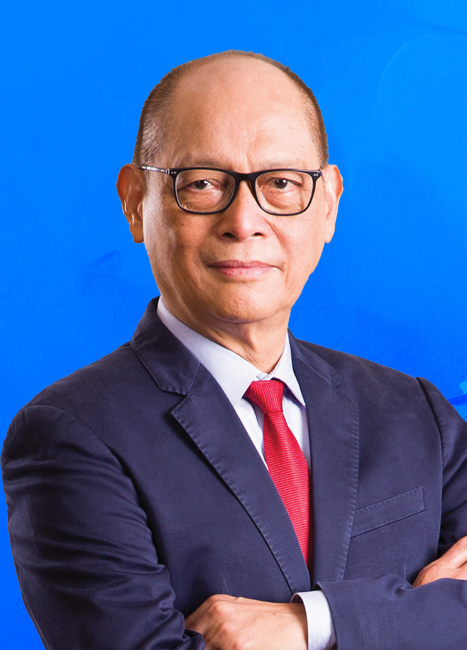
Finance Secretary Benjamin Diokno

In student leadership, the Roster of Lords include 22 Philippine Collegian editors-in-chief, nine Philippine Law Journal editorial board chairpersons, eight Philippinensian editors-in-chief, nine Philippine Law Register editors-in-chief, seven University Student Council chairpersons, and four Law Student Government presidents.

The fraternity has also produced 31 Philippine Bar Examination topnotchers, seven Senators, six justices of the Supreme Court, four Integrated Bar of the Philippines national presidents, three deans of the UP College of Law, six The Outstanding Young Men of the Philippines awardees, two The Outstanding Filipino Awardees, and 19 justices of the Court of Appeals .

Notable members include:

- Francis Escudero – Senator from 2007 to 2016 and 2022 onwards; Sorsogon Governor; Sorsogon Representative
- Reynato Puno – 22nd Chief Justice of the Supreme Court; Deputy Minister/Undersecretary, Department of Justice
- Benjamin Diokno – 5th Governor, Bangko Sentral ng Pilipinas; Secretary, Department of Budget and Management
- Renato Constantino – respected historian; honoree, Bantayog ng mga Bayani; 1992 The Outstanding Filipino Awardee
- Ambrosio Padilla – Senator from 1957 to 1972; Vice President, 1986 Constitutional Commission; Solicitor General
- Heherson Alvarez – Senator from 1987 to 2001; Minister, Department of Agrarian Reform; Secretary, Department of Environment and Natural Resources
- Genaro Magsaysay – Senator from 1959 to 1972; Zambales Representative
- Robert Barbers – Senator from 1998 to 2004; Secretary, Department of Interior and Local Government; Surigao del Norte Representative
- Joey Lina – Senator from 1987 to 1995; Secretary, DILG; Laguna Governor; Metro Manila Governor
- Leonardo Quisumbing – 140th Associate Justice of the Supreme Court of the Philippines; Secretary, Department of Labor and Employment
- Hugo E. Guttierez, Jr. – Senior Associate Justice of the Supreme Court
- Abdulwahid Bidin – 117th Associate Justice of the Supreme Court of the Philippines; first Filipino Muslim named to the Supreme Court
- Abraham Sarmiento – Associate Justice of the Supreme Court; Cavite delegate, 1971 Constitutional Convention; veteran, US Army Forces in the Far East
- Jose P. Perez – 167th Associate Justice of the Supreme Court of the Philippines
- Oscar Orbos – Pangasinan Governor; Pangasinan Representative; Executive Secretary; Secretary, Department of Transportation and Communication
- Pablo John Garcia – Deputy Speaker of the House of Representatives; Cebu Representative
- Edcel Lagman – Albay Representative; President, Liberal Party
- Henry Villarica – Bulacan Representative; President, Villarica Pawnshop, Inc
- Ace Barbers – Surigao del Norte Representative; Surigao del Norte Governor
- Lauro Baja – President, United Nations Security Council; Permanent Representative to the United Nations
- Sam Verzosa – Tutok To Win Party-List Representative
- Zia Alonto Adiong – Lanao del Sur Representative
- Angelo Jimenez – President, University of the Philippines
- Bo Perasol – Former head coach of the UP Fighting Maroons and Ateneo Blue Eagles
- Raul Villanueva – 195th Associate Justice of the Supreme Court of the Philippines
