= Luca Zordan =

Italian photographer

Luca Zordan is a photographer who specializes in photographing children. He was born in Venice, Italy, and relocated to the United States in 1993. Zordan has been a longtime contributor to Vogue Bambini and has photographed ad campaigns for agencies such as BBDO, Young & Rubicam, Saatchi & Saatchi, and Ogilvy & Mather.

Zordan also works on photographic projects for charitable causes. In 2004, the Italian publisher Mondadori Electa issued his photo book & Sons: Children Around the World (ISBN 88-370-3103-3). Part of the proceeds benefited Doctors Without Borders.

In 2008, Zordan collaborated with international humanitarian activist Alethea Gold on the independently published book Children of China. "Coffee-table collection must Children of China by fashion photographer Luca Zordan, is guaranteed to bring the wows out of you," wrote Hong Kong newspaper The Standard. Proceeds from the sale of the book benefit the Hong Kong–based Chi Heng Foundation, which supports children from Central China who have been orphaned or whose families have otherwise affected by HIV/AIDS. There have been several exhibitions of the photos from the book, including one at Pacific Place in Hong Kong in June 2009 sponsored by the Australian government, Qantas, Grand Hyatt, and the Swire Group.

In 2010, Zordan collaborated with Alethea Gold again, this time on the book The Children of South Africa. All profits from the sale has been donated to https://afrikatikkun.org a charity based in Johannesburg providing education and sport facility to children of the townships.

In 2012 published another charity photo book in Israel, Children of Israel, as the previous books all the proceeds has been donated to the Ethiopian refugee center in Bersheva, Israel to help the relocation of children and their families, in Israel.

Lenfanterrible magazine is the new project created and curated by Zordan, launched in 2015, it works as digital platform to gather visual and literal contributions from artists working in fashion, design, illustration, writing, photography and philanthropy. Lenfanterrible is a place where artists can showcase projects and ideas without any restraints that burden the usual publishing medium.

Luca Zordan is syndicate by Gallery Stock, New York

== Bibliography ==
- "& Sons: Children Around the World", Mondadori Electa, 2004 ISBN 88-370-3103-3
- " Children of China " Zheng Publishing, 2008
- " Children of South Africa " 2010
