= Abraham Sarmiento Jr. =

Filipino student journalist

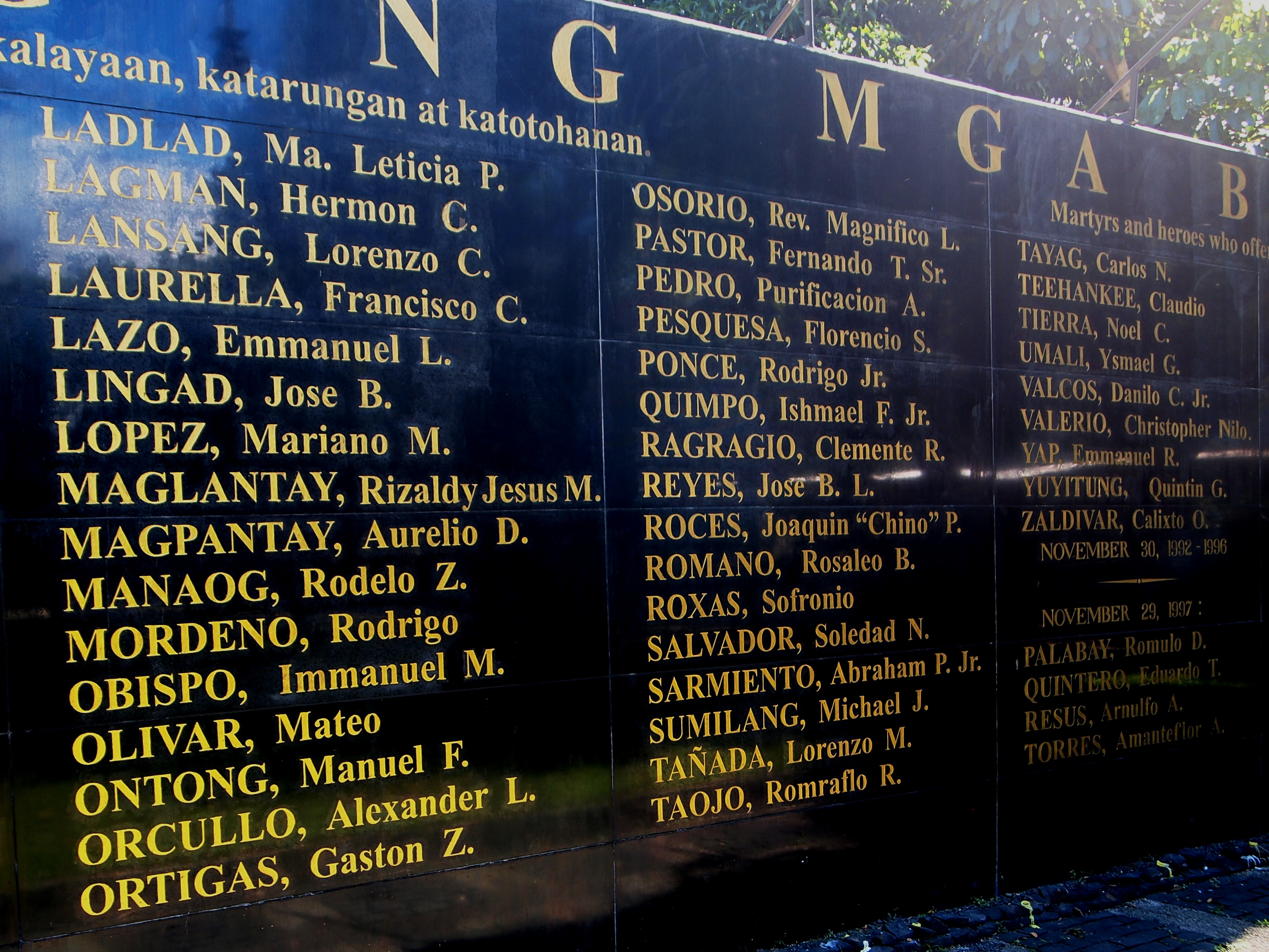
- Detail of the Wall of Remembrance at the Bantayog ng mga Bayani, showing names from the first batch of Bantayog Honorees, including that of Abraham Sarmiento Jr.
- Born: June 5, 1950; Santa Mesa, Manila, Philippines
- Died: November 11, 1977 (aged 27); Quezon City, Philippines
- Other name: Ditto
- Education: University of the Philippines Diliman (no degree)
- Occupations: student, journalist
- Known for: being the editor-in-chief of the Philippine Collegian during martial law
- Spouse: Marsha Santos (m. 1970)
- Children: 1
- Parent(s): Abraham Sarmiento Sr. Irene Pascual

Abraham "Ditto" Pascual Sarmiento Jr. (June 5, 1950 – November 11, 1977) was a Filipino student journalist who gained prominence as an early and visible critic of the martial law regime of dictator Ferdinand Marcos. As editor-in-chief of the Philippine Collegian, Ditto melded the University of the Philippines student newspaper into an independent though solitary voice against martial law rule at a time when the mass media was under the control of the Marcos government. His subsequent seven-month imprisonment by the military impaired his health and contributed to his premature death.

== Early life ==
Ditto was born in Santa Mesa, Manila. His father, Abraham Sarmiento Sr., was a well-known lawyer and close friend of President Diosdado Macapagal who would be appointed an Associate Justice of the Supreme Court of the Philippines years after his son's death. His mother, Irene, was a member of the Pascual family of Malabon, who founded Pascual Laboratories in 1946. As a child, Ditto was a voracious reader who would engage in discussions with adults about literature, religion and art.

Ditto finished his primary and secondary education at the Ateneo de Manila. He distinguished himself at the Ateneo with his high marks and literary skills and even represented his school on a televised quiz show. His schooling though was frequently impaired by asthma attacks, which necessitated the installation of an oxygen tank in his bedroom.

In 1967, Ditto enrolled at the University of the Philippines in Diliman where he joined the Alpha Phi Beta fraternity, the Greek letter organization of his father. At U.P., he befriended student activists who were increasingly agitated against the presidency of Ferdinand Marcos, especially during the First Quarter Storm. In 1970, Ditto married his girlfriend, Marsha, and dropped out of the university. They had one son together, Abraham III, nicknamed Ditter. He and his wife would separate by 1972.

== Philippine Collegian ==
After Marcos placed the Philippines under martial law in 1972, Ditto re-enrolled at the University of the Philippines as a business administration and accountancy student. He joined the staff of the official university newspaper, the Philippine Collegian. In 1975, Ditto was named the editor-in-chief of the Collegian after placing first in the editorial exams.

Philippine newspapers and other mass media outlets had been closed upon the declaration of martial law, with only those sympathetic to the Marcos government being allowed to re-open. Against this backdrop, the Collegian under Ditto's leadership began to publish articles and editorials criticizing martial law and calling for the restoration of democracy. Ditto himself penned several editorials which he personally signed, concerning topics such as freedom of speech and of the press. He called on students to fight for the restoration of democratic rights and civil liberties. He urged his fellow students: "Kung hindi tayo kikilos? Kung di tayo kikibo, sino ang kikibo? Kung hindi ngayon, kailan pa?" ("If we do not act, who will act? If we do not care, who will care? If not now, when?")

Ditto was said not to possess radical or leftist beliefs himself but was spurred into action by a sense of justice and fair play. The staff of the Collegian was itself ideologically split between radical leftists and more moderate members, but Ditto was able to bridge the divide among the staff.

== Imprisonment ==
In December 1975, Ditto and Fides Lim, the managing editor of the Collegian were picked up for questioning by the military, in connection with an editorial entitled "Purge II" which Ditto had written. They were released shortly, but not before they were brought before Defense Minister Juan Ponce Enrile, who personally expressed displeasure over the editorial. The following month, Ditto wrote an editorial for the Collegian entitled "Where Do We Go from Here" which criticized Marcos's New Society and urged public debate about martial law. At a university symposium on January 15, 1976, Ditto read his editorial aloud to the audience. Nine days later, he was arrested at his home. Among the arresting officers was future Senator Panfilo Lacson.

Ditto would remain under detention until August 1976. The official order of arrest, which specified charges of "rumor-mongering and the printing and circulation of leaflets and propaganda materials", was served only five months after his arrest. At one point, he would share a cell with Satur Ocampo, then a ranking member of the National Democratic Front.

In the meantime, Ditto's health had deteriorated as he had been deprived of his asthma medication. In the course of his detention, he was incarcerated in a cell at Camp Crame whose doors and windows were nearly completely sealed with plywood. Ditto nonetheless executed an affidavit where he defended the publication of the offending editorials in the exercise of free speech, press freedom, and the enjoyment of academic freedom. Ditto likewise refuse to recant his editorials. He wrote to his father, "To back off now would be an abandonment of principles I believe in and a tarnish on my integrity as an individual. I do not believe I could live with myself then."

Ditto's father interceded with Deputy Defense Minister Carmelo Barbero to obtain medical attention for his son. On August 28, 1976, Ditto was released from prison.

== Death and legacy ==
After his release, Ditto re-enrolled at the University of the Philippines and tried to keep a low profile. However, his asthma had been aggravated by his detention, and he would regularly endure painful and severe attacks. On November 11, 1977, a little over a year after his release, the 27-year-old Ditto was found dead on his bedroom floor after suffering a heart attack.

Two weeks after Ditto's death, the Collegian published an issue where emblazoned on the cover were the words "Para sa iyo, Ditto Sarmiento, sa iyong paglilingkod sa mag-aaral at sambayanan." ("To you, Ditto Sarmiento, for your service to the studentry and the Filipino people.") The cover also featured an outline of the U.P. Oblation with its right hand raised in a fist, having broken free from chains. The University would award a posthumous degree to Ditto in 1978.

After Ditto's death, his father intensified his participation in the political opposition against the Marcos government, and would himself be detained in 1979 after publishing a book critical of the regime. Abraham Sarmiento Sr. would be appointed to the Supreme Court of the Philippines after the ousting of the Marcos Government in 1986.

In 1992, Ditto was listed as among the martyrs who were enshrined in the Wall of Remembrance at the Bantayog ng mga Bayani, a monument to victims and heroes of martial law located at Quezon Avenue in Quezon City.

In 2018, the Human Rights Victims' Claims Board (HRVCB) formally recognized Sarmiento and 126 other individuals as a motu proprio victim of human rights violations committed under the Marcos Sr. dictatorship.
