= Castillejos National High School =

Public high school in Zambales, Philippines

Location
- San Roque National Highway; Castillejos, Zambales; Philippines
- 14°55′46″N 120°12′21″E

Information
- Type: Public
- Established: 2000- Formerly Jesus F. Magsaysay High School
- Principal: Alan R. Rapada
- Grades: 7 to 12
- Gender: Co-education
- Color: Green

Castillejos National High School is a school located in Castillejos, Zambales, Philippines. It provides education from Grade 7 to 12. Beside the school was the Villafor Elementary School. The school has different clubs that student can join in.

== History ==
San Agustin Barangay High School was the only public secondary school in Castillejos in 1974 in one of the Barangays in Castillejos, Zambales. Later, it was named San Agustin High School and enrollment gradually increased and recorded 500 students during the school year of 1990. Ten years after, the number tripled and the school plant could no longer contain its increasing population, with only 18 academic classrooms. Further aggravated as a result of wear and tear, the school building was dilapidated. Classroom shortage became the main problem and to address this inconvenience, classes were conducted under the trees and in makeshift rooms.

In 1999, San Agustin High School was renamed as Jesus F. Magsaysay High School and was relocated at Barangay San Roque, Castillejos, Zambales where Villaflor Elementary School is also located, leaving the old campus to San Agustin Elementary School. The construction and opening of Jesus F. Magsaysay High School became a highlight for the Department of Education in the Division of Zambales. It was so named because it was through the effort of Governor Vicente P. Magsaysay that this infrastructure became a reality. From then on, enrollment continued to flourish as it is today. It continues to provide quality education for all as the basic tool for development and likewise for the improvement of the community.

Education progressed as manifested by the opening of one school after the other. A brainchild of Castor Feria, Principal IV; the Jesus F. Magsaysay High School (2002) at Balaybay, (2002), Jesus F. Magsaysay Technical Vocational High School (2006) at Sta. Maria, and the most recent – the re-opening of the San Agustin High School (2008) at San Agustin; all in this town of Castillejos. These schools at present are in full-swing of operation.

To date, the main school has one Principal IV, 60 teaching staff, nine head teachers, one guidance counselor, two provincial/ contractual teachers, three non-teaching staff and six general personnel, (utility/guard) are under the payroll of the PTA and one utility under the school's payroll.

At present, the school operates under the name Castillejos National High School. Renamed through a resolution passed by the Sangguniang Bayan under the administration of then Mayor of the Municipality, Hon. Wilma Dalit Billman on 2009, dedicating the school to the youths and people of Castillejos.

This school undertakes the Basic Education Curriculum for the 4th year curriculum, while the Grade 7 to Grade 9 is under K+12 curriculum and has its Special Program in the Arts and Special Program in Sports in June 2012 in answer to the call of the department’s advocacy to improve learning outcomes and teacher performance. It implements the EASE under the DORP and has the latest program called BPOSA (Balik-Paaralan para sa Out-of-School Youth Adults).

== Academic subjects ==
- English
- Mathematics
- Science
- Values Education
- Social Studies
- Filipino
- MAPEH (Music, Arts, Physical Education and Health)
- TLE
- Computer
- Religion

== Facilities ==
- Library
- Clinic
- Filipino room
- English room
- TLE room
- MAPEH room
- Science room
- Computer room
- Covered Court
- Multipurpose room
- 3 comfort room buildings
- 3 canteens

== Special Programs ==
These are the following special programs that are currently inside the school campus:

=== Special Program in the Arts ===
This program consists of five different majors that the students can choose when enrolling for the first year of high school based on his/her special skills or talent: music, dance, theater, visual arts, media arts.

=== Special Program in Foreign Language ===
The program offers only one language to learn in the entire junior high school which is Mandarin.

=== Special Program in Sports ===
This program focuses mainly on the western and some Filipino sports such as volleyball, basketball, baseball, badminton, chess and sepak takraw

=== Science Technology and Engineering Program ===
STEP is a program designed to strengthen science and math education delivered through special science classes in public secondary schools implementing a specialized Science & Math curriculum.
