= Chung To =

Hong Kong HIV/AIDS activist

- 杜聰
- Born: British Hong Kong
- Other name: Du Cong
- Citizenship: American
- Education: Columbia University; Harvard University

Chung To (Chinese: 杜聰; born 1966 or 1967) is a Chinese AIDS activist. He founded the Chi Heng Foundation (CHF) in 1998, which primarily serves AIDS orphans in Hong Kong and mainland China.

== Early life and education ==
Chung To was born in British Hong Kong . His family was originally from northern China（ Hebei province ), with his grandfather working in the railroad industry. They fled to Hong Kong in 1937 under threat of Japanese invasion.

As a child, his family moved to the United States, in hopes of giving To and his sister, Wing, a good education. As a result, he has dual American and Hong Kong citizenship. In the 1980s, To came out to his friends as gay. He received his bachelor's degree in engineering from Columbia University, and a master's degree in East Asian studies from Harvard University in 1991.

After graduating, To worked as an investment banker for a decade, first working on Wall Street for Lehman Brothers and then in Hong Kong for firm UBS beginning in 1995.

== Activism ==
To first became involved in AIDS activism in the 1980s, when he participated in the AIDS walk and campus events at Columbia. He then became introduced to tongzhi and AIDS activism in Hong Kong after beginning work there in 1995. In 1997, he decided to use his business skills to further activist work.

To co-founded the Chi Heng Foundation (CHF; Chi Heng meaning "wisdom in action") in 1998, and had devoted himself fully to the foundation by 2001. In 2002, after meeting some AIDS orphans, he shifted the foundation's focus to serve AIDS orphans in China, through programs offering "tuition and school aid...psychosocial support, art therapy, summer camps, and vocational training". In 2005, CHF's Henan office was briefly shut down by local officials. To has publicly focused on child welfare and diplomatic language to avoid being targeted for his role as an AIDS activist.

In 2006, To was invited to speak at the Central Chinese Communist Party School in Beijing, one of only a few NGO leaders to do so.

By 2011, CHF had expanded to have branches in Beijing, Guangzhou, and Shanghai, and the provinces of Anhui and Henan. In 2015, CHF received the China Charity Award from the Ministry of Civil Affairs.

== Recognition ==
To was awarded the 2007 Ramon Magsaysay Award for Emergent Leadership (shared with Chen Guangcheng). In 2010, BNP Paribas presented him with an award for individual philanthropy.
