= Chi Heng Foundation =

Hong Kong-based non-governmental organisation

The Chi Heng Foundation (CHF) is a Hong Kong–based non-governmental organisation dedicated to addressing children impacted by AIDS and also to AIDS prevention and education. Established in 1998 by Chung To, the NGO has offices in Beijing, Shanghai, Guangzhou, Anhui and, especially, Henan. The organisation attracted notice in China in 2004 when it helped Shanghai's Fudan University organise a graduate level class on the subject of homosexuality, the first such class in the country.

== Mission ==
The organisation provides assistance to children who have a parent with HIV/AIDS or have lost a parent to AIDS since 2002 or who are themselves infected. CHF operates under the premise that these children are best served by being raised within their communities in conjunction with children not impacted by HIV/AIDS, allowing them to avoid social stigma and to better integrate into their communities as adults. The primary avenue through which CHF attempts to assist children is financial, in funding educational and living expenses.

The organisation also supports the tongzhi population both in HIV/AIDS education and prevention and in promoting sexual minority rights. In addition to working directly with the community, the organisation educates the owners of saunas and brothels.
