= Fidel Nemenzo =

Filipino mathematician, educator

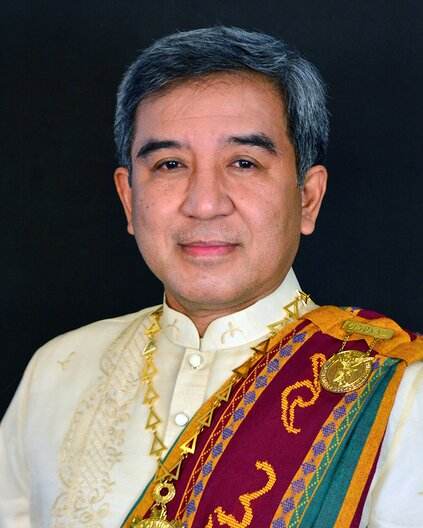

11th Chancellor of the University of the Philippines Diliman
- In office March 1, 2020 – March 2, 2023
- UP President: Danilo Concepcion; Angelo Jimenez
- Preceded by: Michael Tan
- Succeeded by: Edgardo Carlo Vistan II

Vice Chancellor for Research and Development of the University of the Philippines Diliman
- In office 2014–2020
- UP President: Alfredo E. Pascual; Danilo Concepcion
- Preceded by: Michael Tan

Personal details
- Spouse: Ma. Victoria Raquiza
- Parent: Francisco Nemenzo Jr. (father)
- Education: University of the Philippines Diliman (B.S.); Sophia University (M.S., D.Sc.)
- Profession: Mathematician; educator

Fidel Ronquillo Nemenzo is a Filipino mathematician and professor who served as chancellor of the University of the Philippines Diliman from 2020 to 2023.

His areas of expertise include number theory, elliptic curves, and coding theory. He earned his bachelor's degree in mathematics from UP Diliman while his master's and Doctor of Science degrees are from Sophia University in Tokyo, Japan.

== Career ==
On March 2, 2020, he succeeded Michael Tan and became the eleventh Chancellor of the University of the Philippines Diliman. Immediately prior to his appointment, he was vice chancellor for Research and Development of UP Diliman and is the convenor of the Center for Integrative Development Studies' Data Science for Public Policy Program. He chairs the Mathematics Division of the National Research Council of the Philippines, having been elected to the NRCP Governing Board in 2019. He was Associate Dean for Academic Affairs of the UP Diliman College of Science and headed its Science and Society Program. Nemenzo also served as President of both the Southeast Asian Mathematical Society (2010–2012) and the Mathematical Society of the Philippines (2004–2010).

Nemenzo is a member of the Pan Xenia Fraternity.

== Family ==
Nemenzo is the son of political scientist and former UP president Francisco Nemenzo Jr. His grandfather, Francisco Nemenzo Sr., was Professor of Zoology and Dean of the UP College of Arts and Sciences in the 1960s, who did pioneering work in the study of corals. Nemenzo is married to Dr. Ma. Victoria Raquiza, professor at the UP National College of Public Administration and Governance. Their son, Julio Anton Mulawin, graduated from the UP School of Economics in 2020.

== Awards ==
Nemenzo's awards include OneUP Professorial Chair awards and International Publication Awards which he received from the University of the Philippines System; the Achievement Award in Mathematics from the National Research Council of the Philippines in 2013; and the Gawad Chancellor Para sa Pinakamahusay na Guro, which he received from the University of the Philippines Diliman in 2005.

== Political activism ==
The son of Martial Law era activist and later University of the Philippines President Francisco Nemenzo Jr, he has himself had a long history of political activism. He was a member of the Student Christian Movement of the Philippines.

A UP student leader during the time of martial law under Ferdinand Marcos, he was shot in the back during the infamous Welcome Rotonda rally shootings of September 27, 1984 and almost died from the single M-16 bullet that pierced through his body. Fellow activists attribute his survival from his wounds to the fact that he was a runner. He was known for his athleticism and healthy lifestyle in the campus.

He was also a founding member of the activist musical group "Patatag".

In recent years, he has strongly denounced the red tagging of UP students who have taken a stand against authoritarianism in the Philippines.

On January 19, 2020, he spoke at the protest demonstration against the Department of National Defense (DND)'s unilateral termination of the 1989 UP-DND Accord which requires the police and military to notify UP officials before they enter UP campuses. During the protest, he declared that academic freedom and "UP as a safe space and a zone for free thought and free speech" have to be defended at all times.

== See also ==
- Protest art against the Marcos dictatorship
