= Nemenzo =

Nemenzo is a surname of Filipino origin. Notable people with the surname include:

- Fidel Nemenzo, Filipino mathematician and professor
- Francisco Nemenzo Jr. (1935–2024), Filipino political scientist, educator, and activist
