= Francisco Nemenzo =

Filipino political scientist, educator and activist (1935–2024)

Francisco Nemenzo Jr.
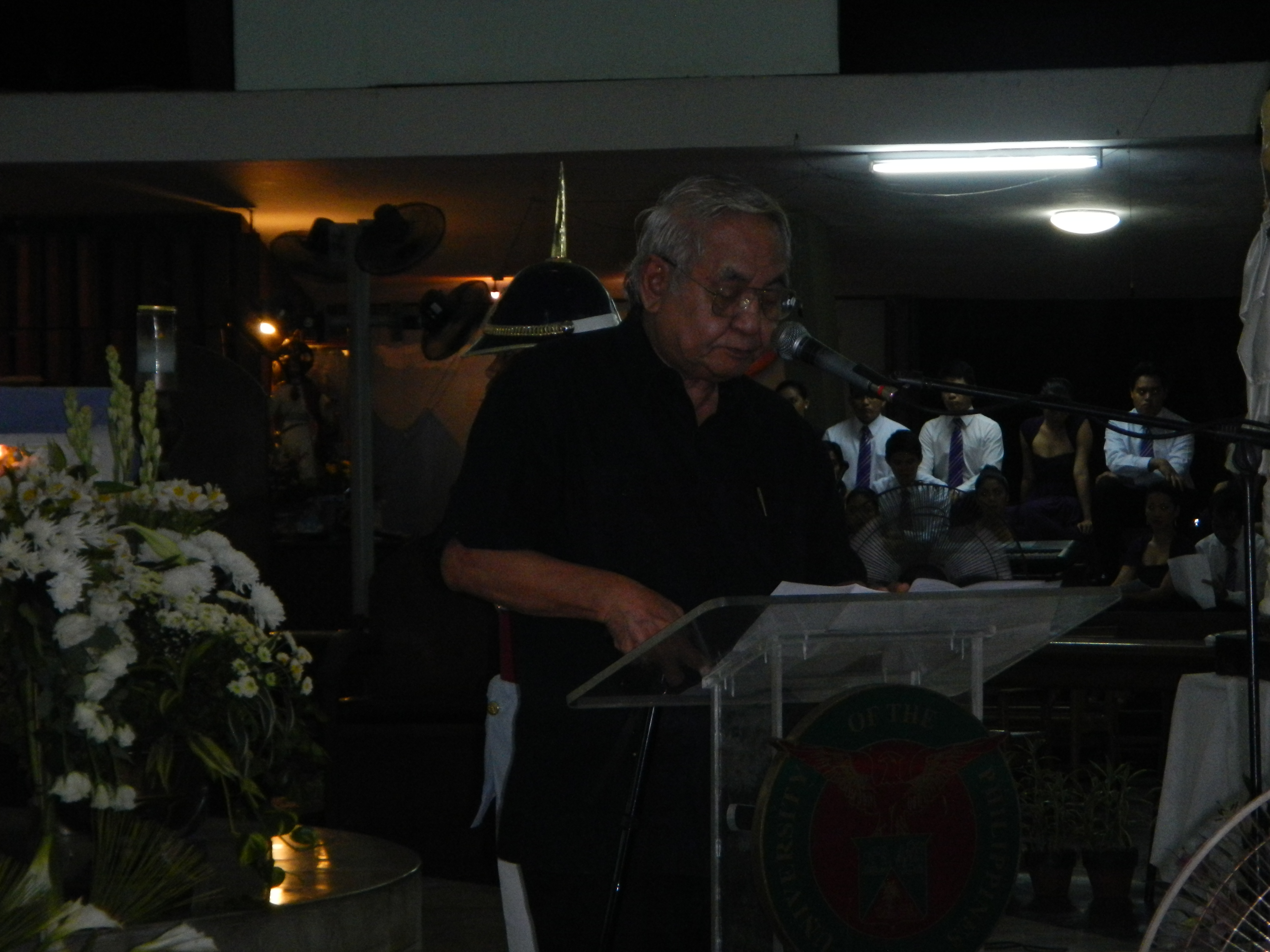
- Nemenzo in 2013

18th President of the University of the Philippines
- In office 1999–2005
- Preceded by: Emil Q. Javier
- Succeeded by: Emerlinda R. Roman

3rd Chancellor of the University of the Philippines Visayas
- In office August 29, 1989 – August 31, 1992
- University President: José Abueva
- Preceded by: Rogelio Juliano
- Succeeded by: Flor J. Lacanilao

Faculty Regent of the University of the Philippines
- In office 1988–1989
- University President: José Abueva

Dean of the College of Arts & Sciences University of the Philippines Diliman
- In office 1976–1981
- University President: Onofre Corpuz; Emanuel V. Soriano; Edgardo Angara

Personal details
- Born: 9 February 1935 Cebu City, Cebu, Philippine Islands
- Died: 19 December 2024 (aged 89) Quezon City, Philippines
- Spouse: Ana Maria "Princess" Ronquillo
- Children: Fidel; Leonid; Lian
- Education: University of the Philippines Diliman (B.P.A. & M.P.A.); University of Manchester (Ph.D.)
- Occupation: University administrator; professor; political scientist

Francisco Alfafara Nemenzo Jr. (9 February 1935 – 19 December 2024) was a Filipino political scientist, educator, and activist who served as the 18th president of the University of the Philippines (UP) from 1999 to 2005. He had previously served as chancellor of UP Visayas, UP Faculty Regent, and dean of the College of Arts & Sciences of UP Diliman.

A prominent Marxist figure in the Philippine academe, (Note: Sources describing Nemenzo as "marxist":) he was a professor emeritus of political science at UP Diliman and taught courses in political philosophy and Philippine government. He also helped form several political coalitions such as Bukluran sa Ikauunlad ng Sosyalistang Isip at Gawa (BISIG), Akbayan, and Laban ng Masa.

Nemenzo was from a family of scholars, academics, and educators. His father, Francisco Sr., was a marine zoologist known as the "father of Philippine coral taxonomy". His son, Fidel, is a mathematician and the 11th chancellor of UP Diliman.

== Career ==
=== Early political activity ===
Nemenzo was a member of the Partido Komunista ng Pilipinas (PKP; lit. 'Philippine Communist Party'), a separate organization from the Communist Party of the Philippines.

=== Administrative experience ===
Prior to becoming UP President, Nemenzo served as chancellor of the University of the Philippines Visayas and as a member of the Board of Regents, the highest policy-making body of the University, representing the faculty. He was also dean of the College of Arts and Sciences, which was split into three academic units: College of Science (CS), College of Social Sciences & Philosophy (CSSP), and the College of Arts & Letters (CAL).

=== University presidency ===
Nemenzo was elected UP president against prominent competitors such as former senator Leticia Ramos-Shahani, former minister of economic planning Gerardo Sicat, and public administration pioneer and sociologist Ledivina V. Cariño. He succeeded Emil Q. Javier. An appointee of President Joseph Estrada, Nemenzo was criticized in the university for not supporting the Second EDSA Revolution that overthrew Estrada in 2001.

His term was notable for the institutionalization of the Revised General Education Program (RGEP), comparable to the general education program of Harvard University and other American educational institutions, seeking to provide a holistic development of students through a free choice system of selecting courses in three divisions (Arts & Humanities, Social Science & Philosophy, and Mathematics, Science & Technology) to fit each student's intellectual pursuits. However, a comprehensive review of the program was initiated, linking the introduction of the RGEP to the grade inflation phenomenon. It led to a synthesis of the old general education program and the RGEP which has been adopted by the University since 2012.

In 2005, he stepped down as the University's highest official and was replaced by Emerlinda Roman of the College of Business Administration.

== Personal life ==
=== Family ===
Nemenzo's father, Francisco Sr., was a marine zoologist referred to as the "father of Philippine coral taxonomy" and has served as dean of UP Diliman's College of Arts and Sciences. His mother, Catalina Alfafara, served as senior librarian at the UP Diliman library.

Nemenzo was married to Ana Maria "Princess" Ronquillo, a feminist and anti-poverty activist. They have three children: mathematician Fidel named after Fidel Castro, physician Leonid, and preschool teacher Lian.

Nemenzo's nickname was "Dodong".

=== Education ===
Nemenzo earned his bachelor's and master's degrees in public administration from the National College of Public Administration and Governance at the University of the Philippines Diliman in 1957 and 1959 respectively. During his undergraduate years, he joined the Pan Xenia Fraternity. He then obtained a Ph.D. in political history from the University of Manchester in 1965.

=== Death ===
Francisco Nemenzo Jr. died in Quezon City on 19 December 2024, at the age of 89.

== Selected publications ==
- May, R.J.; Nemenzo, Francisco, eds. (1985). The Philippines after Marcos. London: Croom Helm. ISBN 0709935617.
- Nemenzo, Francisco (2000). U.P. Into the 21st Century and other essays. Quezon City, Philippines: University of the Philippines Press. ISBN 971-542-248-9.
- Nemenzo, Francisco Jr. (1984). "Rectification process in the Philippine communist movement". In Lim, Joo-Jock; Shanmugaratnam, Vani (eds.). Armed communist movements in Southeast Asia. Hampshire: Gower. ISBN 0566006987.
- Nemenzo, Francisco Jr. (1992). "Questioning Marx, Critiquing Marxism Reflections on the Ideological Crisis on the Left". Kasarinlan: Philippine Journal of Third World Studies. 8 (2). Third World Studies Center, College of Social Sciences and Philosophy, University of the Philippines Diliman: 5–25.
- Nemenzo, Francisco Jr. (1988). "From autocracy to elite democracy". In Javate-de Dios, Aurora; Daroy, Petronilo Bn.; Kalaw-Tirol, Lorna (eds.). Dictatorship and Revolution: Roots of People's Power. Metro Manila: Conspectus. ASIN B0000EEE8J.
- Nemenzo, Francisco (1984). "The Millenarian-Populist Aspects of Filipino Marxism". Marxism in the Philippines: Marx Centennial Lectures. Quezon City, Philippines: Third World Studies Center, University of the Philippines. pp. 1–40. ASIN B0000EE2YU.

Academic offices
Preceded by Emil Q. Javier	President of the University of the Philippines; 1999–2005	Succeeded by Emerlinda R. Roman
