= Abueva =

Abueva is a surname. Notable people with the surname include:

- Calvin Abueva (born 1988), Filipino basketball player
- José Abueva (1928–2021), Filipino political scientist and scholar
- Napoleon Abueva (1930–2018), National Artist of the Philippines
