= Ledivina V. Cariño =

Filipino sociologist and political scientist

Vice President for Public Affairs of the University of the Philippines
- In office 1992–1993
- President: José Abueva

Dean of the UP National College of Public Administration and Governance
- In office 1998–2001
- In office 1982–1984

Personal details
- Born: April 22, 1942 Alfonso, Cavite
- Died: June 12, 2009 (aged 67) Quezon City, Philippines
- Spouse: Dr. Benjamin V. Carino
- Education: Indiana University Bloomington; University of Hawaii at Manoa; University of the Philippines Diliman

Ledivina Vidallon Cariño was a Filipino sociologist and political scientist. She was University Professor (the highest academic rank in the University of the Philippines), and later University Professor Emeritus, at the National College of Public Administration and Governance of the University of the Philippines Diliman (UP-NCPAG). She also once served as president of the Philippine Sociological Society.

Cariño also sat as dean of the College of Public Administration (UP-CPA), later the UP-NCPAG, for two terms and as vice president for public affairs under then University of the Philippines president Dr. José Abueva.

== Education ==
Cariño obtained her BA Public Administration degree (cum laude) from the University of the Philippines Diliman on 1961. She pursued a master's degree in political science at the University of Hawaii at Manoa under an East-West Center scholarship and eventually a Ph.D. in sociology at Indiana University Bloomington in the United States, one of the world's leading universities in terms of public affairs education.

== Distinctions ==
In 1980, she received the Gintong Aklat Award and was named Outstanding Alumnus of Union High School of Manila in 1981. 'Leddy' to her friends and colleagues, Dr. Cariño was also named Outstanding Alumna by the Philippine Christian University in 1994.

Since 1984, she has held the Philippine Commission on Audit (COA) Professional Chair in Public Administration. In 1987, she received the Reflections of Development Award from the Rockefeller Foundation. In 1993, she received the Lifetime Achievement Award in Social Sciences from the National Research Council of the Philippines. In the same year, Cariño was named University Professor by the University of the Philippines, making her the youngest person to hold the said rank in the university's history. As a University Professor, she was entitled to teach in any college, institute, center, or department within the university.

In 1995, the National Academy of Science and Technology (NAST) named her Academician.

== Positions held ==
As UP vice president for public affairs, she oversaw the earliest moves to revise the U.P. Charter under presidents Abueva and Emil Q. Javier. During her second term as dean, the U.P. College of Public Administration was elevated to the status of a national college, thus renamed to what is now the U.P. National College of Public Administration and Governance.

Cariño was the chairperson of the Technical Panel for Public Administration of the Philippine Commission on Higher Education (CHED) from 2005 to 2009 and Editor-in-Chief of the Philippine Journal of Public Administration (PJPA). She also served in the Philippine Institute for Development Studies (PIDS) board of trustees.

== Death ==
Cariño died on June 12, 2009, after a battle with leukemia.
