= Emerlinda R. Roman =

Filipino educator and academic administrator (born 1949)

Emerlinda Roman
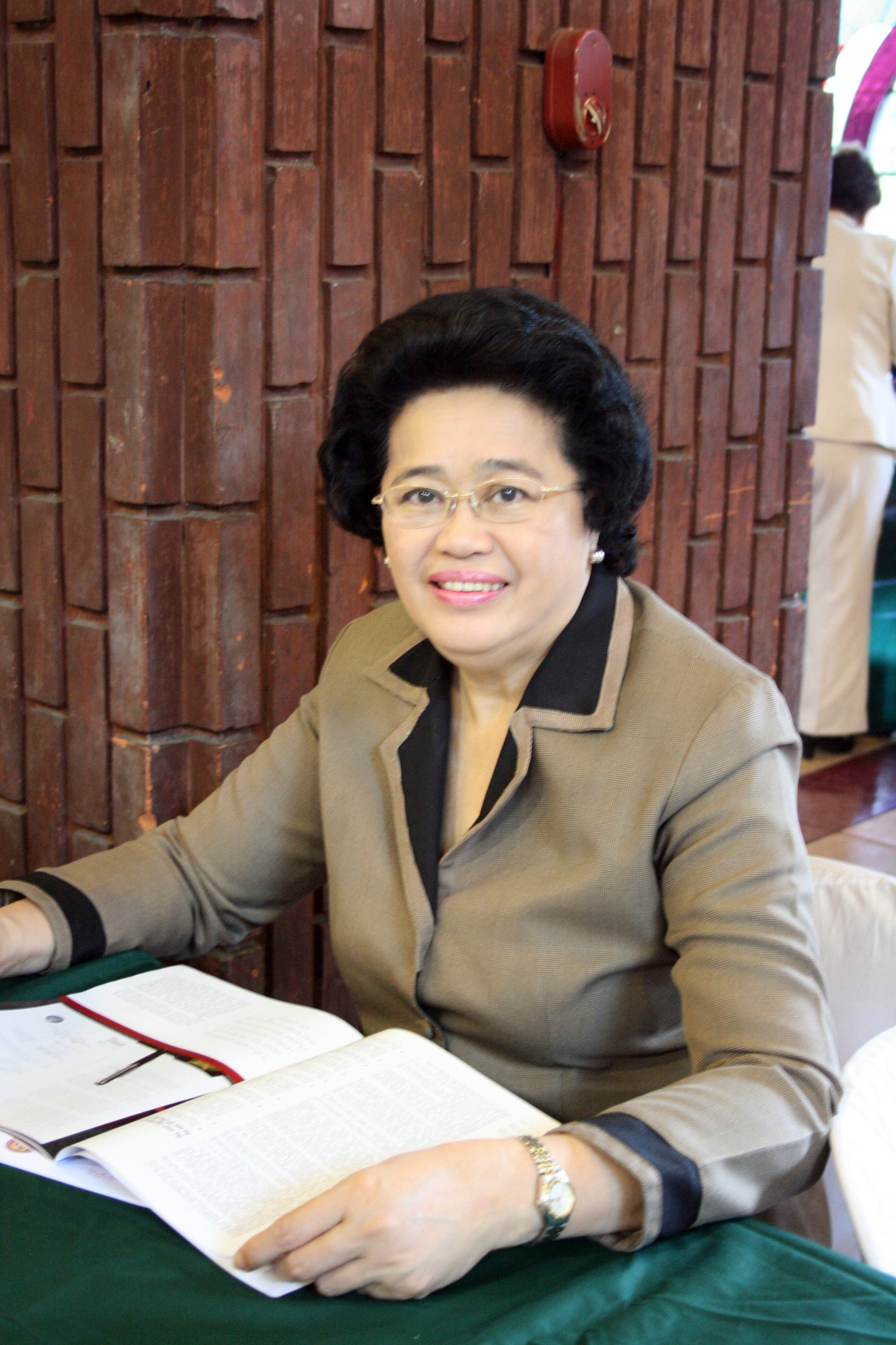

19th President of the University of the Philippines
- In office February 9, 2005 – February 10, 2011
- President: Gloria Macapagal Arroyo
- Preceded by: Francisco Nemenzo Jr.
- Succeeded by: Alfredo E. Pascual

7th Chancellor of the University of the Philippines Diliman
- In office 1999–2005
- President: Francisco Nemenzo, Jr. (UP President)
- Preceded by: Claro C. Llaguno
- Succeeded by: Sergio S. Cao

4th Chancellor of the University of the Philippines Diliman
- In office 1991–1993
- President: José Abueva (UP President)
- Preceded by: José Abueva
- Succeeded by: Roger Posadas

Personal details
- Born: August 30, 1949 (age 77)
- Education: University of the Philippines Los Baños (B.S., 1972); University of the Philippines Diliman (MBA, 1977; DBA, 1989)
- Profession: Educator

Emerlinda Ramos–Roman (born August 30, 1949) is a Filipino educator and university administrator who served as the 19th President of the University of the Philippines from 2005 to 2011, becoming the first woman to hold such position. Roman presently sits as the chairperson of the board of trustees of the International Rice Research Institute and is Professor Emerita at the Cesar E.A. Virata School of Business of the University of the Philippines Diliman.

== Education ==
Roman took her secondary education (highschool) at the University of the Philippines Rural High School at Los Baños, Laguna. Roman took her B.S. degree in agriculture at the University of the Philippines Los Baños in 1972. She earned her master's degree in agribusiness management in 1977 and her Doctor of Business Administration (DBA) degree in 1989 from the College of Business Administration of the University of the Philippines Diliman.

== Career ==
=== Academe ===
Apart from being a chancellor of UP Diliman from 1991 to 1993, and then from 1999 to 2005, she also held various posts in the administration of the Diliman campus, including as the university secretary, vice-chancellor for administration, then vice-president for administration and a member of the UP Board of Regents.

=== Election as UP President ===
On November 17, 2004, the 12-member Board of Regents declared a 6–6 tie between Roman and her closest rival, Philippine Ambassador to the United Kingdom Edgardo B. Espiritu. Among candidates for the presidency includes the English and Comparative Literature chairperson Dr. Consolacion R. Alaras, well-known lawyer Soledad C. de Castro, former Mass Communication dean Dr. Georgina R. Encanto, former University of the East chancellor Dr. Ernesto S. de Castro, former Food Technology director Dr. Eduardo C. Sison, chemistry professor Dr. Ester A. Garcia, businessman and professor Dr. Federico M. Macaranas, political and economic analyst and commentator Prof. Solita C. Monsod, and retired Justice Abraham F. Sarmiento. In order to break the tie between Roman and Espiritu, another Board of Regents meeting was set on November 22, where she was elected over 7-5-vote unanimous decision.

On February 9, 2005, she assumed the position as the president when her predecessor Francisco Nemenzo retired after 45 years of service to the university.

=== Centennial presidency ===
Roman's presidency is known for the implementation of the 300% tuition fee increase—from the basic rate of P300 to P1000 per unit beginning 2007. The move was met with widespread protest within the university community. However, the Board of Regents (BOR) ratified the increase after moving the location of the BOR meeting from Quezon Hall to the UP College of Law without notification.

Her administration's policies included leasing out of university properties such as the U.P.–Ayala Land TechnoHub along Commonwealth Avenue, Quezon City.

== Publications ==
Roman has written and/or co-edited the following publications:

- "Strategic Faculty Resource Management in a State University" in Managing a Modern University, ed. E. Garcia. Quezon City: University of the Philippines Press, 2004.
- Editor, Cases on Strategic Management in the Philippine Setting. Quezon City: UP Press, 2003.
- Management Control Process: Reward and Compensation System. In Management Accounting and Control: Text and Philippine Cases, eds. Erlinda S. Echanis, Rafael A. Rodriguez and Manuel A. Tipgos, 325–355. Manila: Development Center for Finance, FINEX Research and Development Foundation, Inc. and FINEX-PACSB-CB-FUND, 2002.
- Human Resource Management Practices in the Philippines. Philippine Management Review, Volume 7, No. 1, 1997–1998.
- Co-authored with R. A. Rodriguez, E. S. Echanis, E. Pineda and T. Sicat, Management Control in Chinese-Filipino Business Enterprises. Quezon City: U.P. Press, 1996.
- Co-authored with J. Acuña, Values Orientations in Selected Filipino Work Groups. Philippine Management Review, vol. 5, no. 1, December 1994.
- Issue Editor, Philippines Management Review. College of Business Administration, University of the Philippines, 1993–1994.
- Co-editor, The Journal of Reproductive Health, Rights and Ethics, Inaugural Issues, 1994.
- Co-editor, The Aquino Presidency and Administration (1986–1992), Contemporary Assessments and "The Judgement of History?" vol. 2, 1993.
- Co-editor, Corazon C. Aquino, Early Assessment of her Presidential Leadership and Administration and her Place in History, International Edition, 1993.
- Co-editor, The Aquino Administration Record and Legacy (1986–1992), Volume 1, 1992.

Academic offices
Preceded by Francisco Nemenzo, Jr.	President of the University of the Philippines; 2005–2011	Succeeded by Alfredo E. Pascual
