= President of the University of the Philippines =

Chief administrator of the University of the Philippines

- Pangulo ng Unibersidad ng Pilipinas
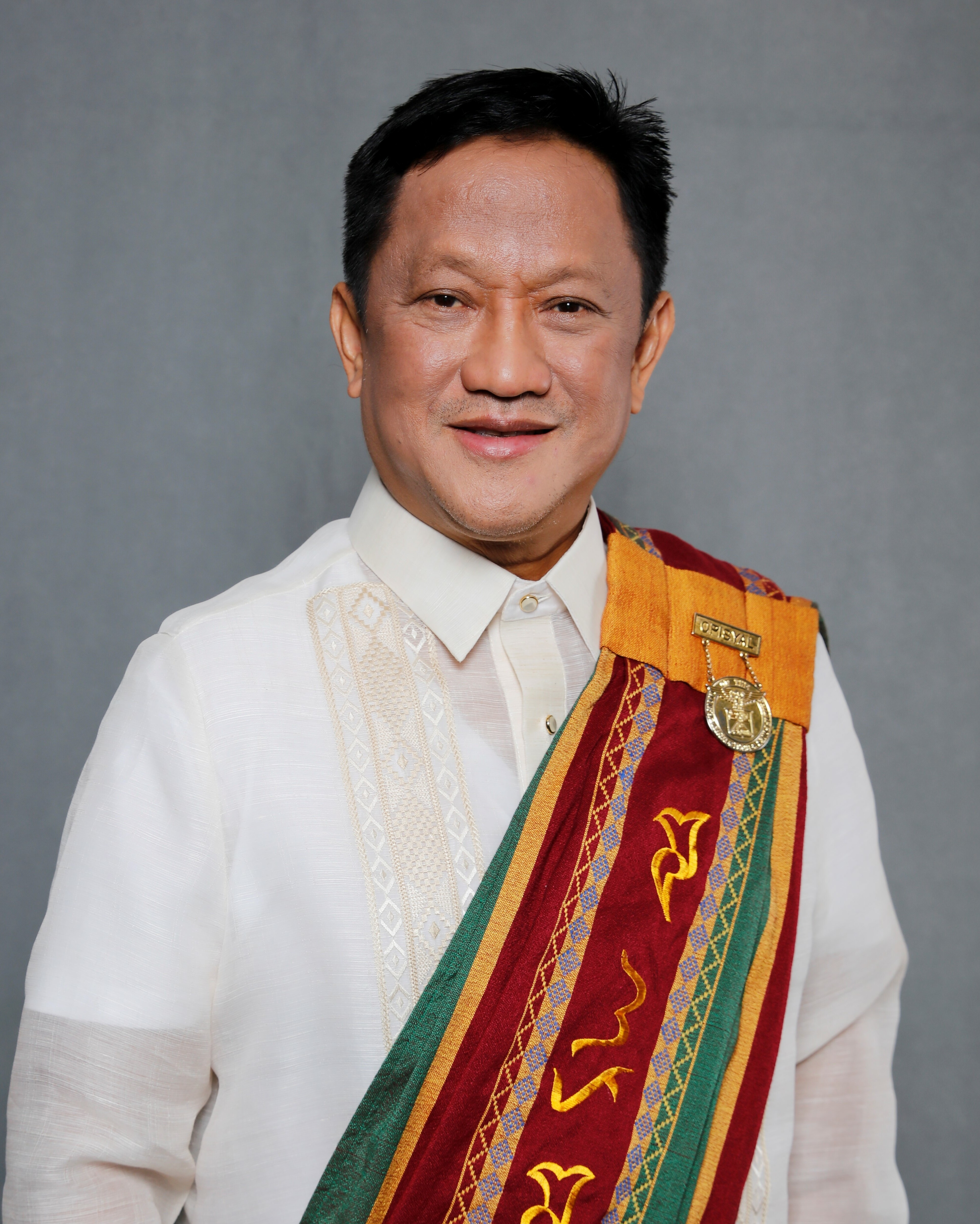
- Incumbent; Angelo Jimenez since February 10, 2023
- University of the Philippines
- Status: Chief Administrator
- Seat: Quezon City, Philippines
- Appointer: Board of Regents
- Term length: Six years, non-renewable
- Formation: 1911
- First holder: Murray S. Bartlett
- Website: Official Website

The president of the University of the Philippines (Filipino: Pangulo ng Unibersidad ng Pilipinas) is the chief administrator and principal executive officer of the University of the Philippines. The president is elected for a single six-year term by the University's eleven-member Board of Regents (BOR). (Before the passage of RA 9500, there were 12 members in the BOR). As of 2023, two Americans and 20 Filipinos have served as President of the University of the Philippines.

Lawyer and former Regent Angelo Jimenez is the current President, having assumed office on February 10, 2023.

== List of presidents of the University of the Philippines ==
No.	Image	Name	Term
-		Newton W. Gilbert (Acting) (Note: Served as Chairman of the Board of Regents)	1908–1911
1		Murray S. Bartlett	1911–1915
2		Ignacio Villamor	1915–1921
3		Guy Potter Wharton Benton	1921–1925
4		Rafael V. Palma	1925–1934
5		Jorge Bocobo	1934–1939
6		Bienvenido Ma. Gonzalez	1939–1943
7		Antonio Sison	1943–1945
(6)		Bienvenido Ma. Gonzalez	1945–1951
8		Vidal A. Tan	1951–1956
9		Enrique T. Virata	1956–1958
10		Vicente G. Sinco	1958–1962
11		Carlos P. Romulo	1962–1968
12		Salvador P. Lopez	1969–1975
13		Onofre D. Corpuz	1975–1979
14		Emanuel V. Soriano	1979–1981
15		Edgardo Angara	1981–1987
16		José Abueva	1987–1993
17		Emil Q. Javier	1993–1999
18		Francisco Nemenzo Jr.	1999–2005
19		Emerlinda R. Roman	2005–2011
20		Alfredo E. Pascual	2011–2017
21		Danilo Concepcion	2017–2023
22		Angelo Jimenez	2023–present
