= Alfredo E. Pascual =

Filipino banker, finance expert, and former university administrator

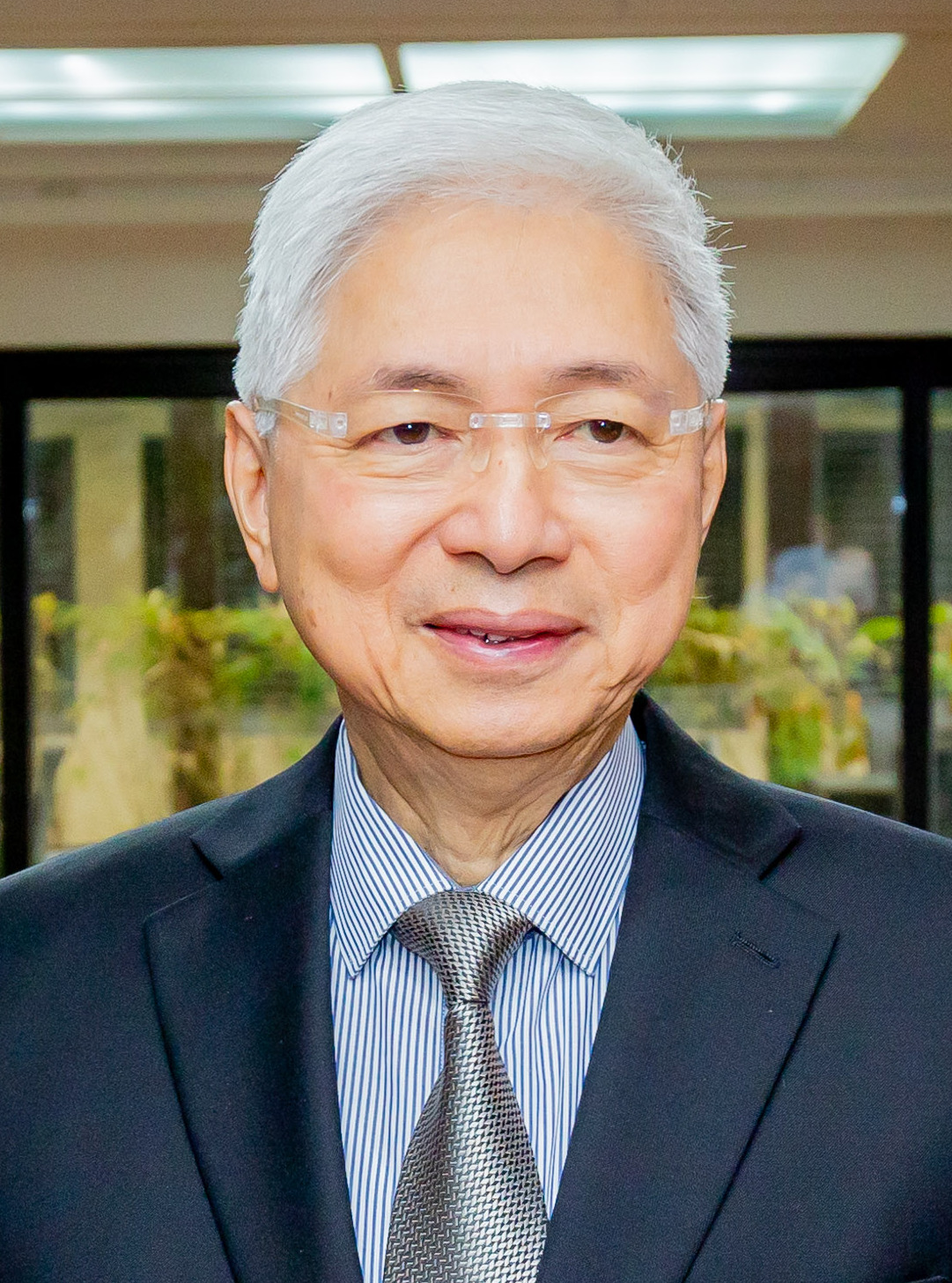
- Pascual in 2023

36th Secretary of Trade and Industry
- In office June 30, 2022 – August 2, 2024
- President: Bongbong Marcos
- Preceded by: Ramon Lopez
- Succeeded by: Cristina Aldeguer-Roque

20th President of the University of the Philippines
- In office February 10, 2011 – February 9, 2017
- Preceded by: Emerlinda R. Roman
- Succeeded by: Danilo Concepcion

Alumni Regent on the Board of the University of the Philippines Concurrently President of the U.P. Alumni Association
- In office 2009–2011

Personal details
- Born: Alfredo Espinosa Pascual; July 7, 1948 (age 78) Caloocan, Rizal, Philippines
- Spouse: Carmen Fernandez Martinez
- Children: 3
- Education: University of the Philippines Diliman (BS, MBA)
- Occupation: Public Servant, University Administrator, Educator, Development Banker, Finance Professor, Corporate Governance Advocate

Alfredo "Fred" Espinosa Pascual (born July 7, 1948) is a Filipino international development banker and finance expert who served as the Secretary of Trade and Industry under the administration of President Bongbong Marcos from June 30, 2022 to August 1, 2024. He also served as the 20th President of the University of the Philippines (U.P.) System, from 2011 to 2017. He was a member of the U.P. Board of Regents, the university's highest policy-making and governing body, representing the alumni, just before he was elected as U.P. President.

At the time of his appointment as Secretary of Trade and Industry, he was the President of the Management Association of the Philippines (MAP) and an independent director of publicly-listed companies including SM Investments, Concepcion Industrial, and Megawide Construction. He was also a former chief executive officer of the Institute of Corporate Directors, a non-stock, non-profit organization established in 1999 to lead in the advocacy for good governance in the corporate sector of the Philippines.

== Early years and education ==
Born to Armando E. Pascual and Melania B. Espinosa, Pascual graduated valedictorian from the University of Santo Tomas High School. He then enrolled in the University of the Philippines Diliman and took up B.S. Chemistry, graduating cum laude in 1969. He received his Master of Business Administration degree from the same university in 1972. While at the University of the Philippines, he was initiated into the Upsilon Sigma Phi.

He attended the EC-ASEAN Teacher Program on the Management of Strategic and Organizational Change at the INSEAD Euro-Asia Centre in Fontainebleau, France.

== Career ==
=== Academe ===
His early career was spent teaching at the chemistry department of the University of the Philippines College of Science as an instructor. He also taught at the Ateneo de Manila University's departments of management engineering and business management as a part-time lecturer for over four years. He later became the American Express Foundation Professor of Financial Management from 1980 to 1989, chair of the Master of Business Management program, and director of the Advanced Bank Management program at the Asian Institute of Management.

=== Business and finance ===
In the 1970s, Pascual was department manager in Procter and Gamble, project manager in Bancom Development Corporation, assistant vice-president in Philippine Pacific Capital Corporation (now RCBC Capital), and vice president in First Metro Investment Corporation. He then joined the faculty of the Asian Institute of Management as finance professor from 1980 to 1989.

From 1989 to 2008, Pascual worked in the Asian Development Bank (ADB) as a senior investment officer in the private sector department. He then became director of its Private Sector Infrastructure Finance Division and its Capital Markets & Finance Sectors Division. Pascual later served as advisor on public-private partnership in infrastructure. He had postings in ADB's resident offices in New Delhi, India and Jakarta, Indonesia. He also represented ADB on the corporate board of the Mutual Fund Company of the Philippines and other corporations in China, India, Hong Kong, and the Netherlands.

=== As U.P. president ===
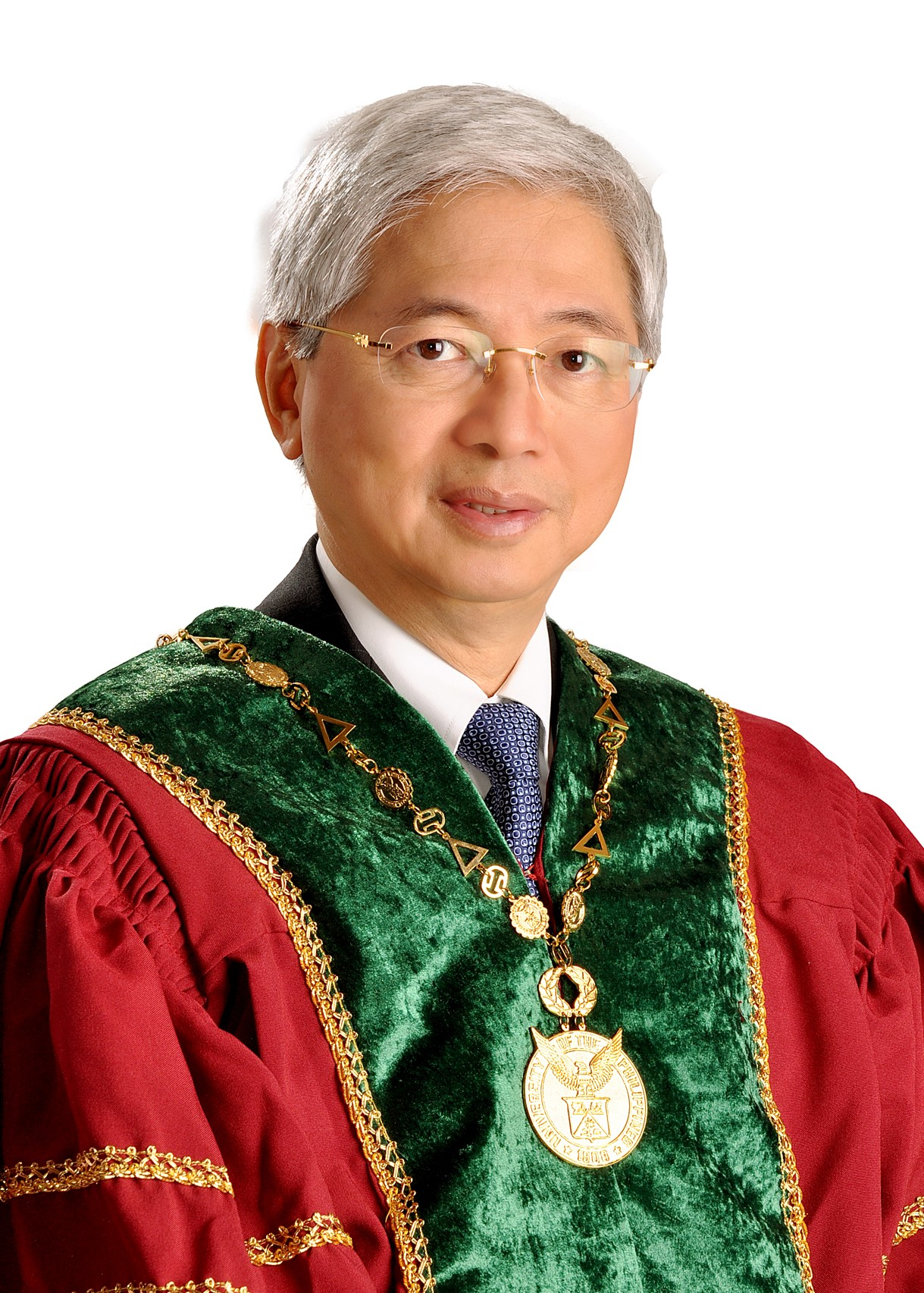
Portrait of Alfredo E. Pascual during his term as U.P. president from 2011 to 2017

Dr. Pascual was selected among the 11 nominees for the presidency of the University of the Philippines System in 2011. Some of the other nominees were: School of Economics professor and current Finance Secretary Benjamin Diokno, former College of Law dean Raul Pangalangan, National Historical Commission of the Philippines chair and former university vice president for academic affairs Ma. Serena Diokno, former Department of English & Comparative Literature chair Consolacion Alaras, former chancellors Sergio Cao of University of the Philippines Diliman and Luis Rey Velasco of University of the Philippines Los Banos, and Social Weather Stations fellow and School of Labor and Industrial Relations professor Virginia Teodosio.

Pascual institutionalized the "One-U.P." paradigm to unify the U.P. System of eight constituent universities spread over 15 campuses across the country and leverage the strengths of 60,000 students, 4,000 faculty, and 8,500 support staff. This initiative encouraged collaborative efforts toward harmonized policies and integrated systems, promoting high-quality education and research.

In the academic sphere, Pascual made significant strides in transforming U.P. into a research-intensive university, raising its international profile as a global university, and strengthening its role in national development as a public service university. He gave priority to creating the enabling conditions needed for achieving these objectives.

To intensify research, he launched new research initiatives such as Emerging Interdisciplinary Research in 2012 and the U.P. Resilience Institute in 2016. He funded the construction of modern laboratories including the ₱1 billion National Institutes of Health building and the ₱350 million Philippine Genome Center (PGC) complex. He sent more faculty members for advanced research studies abroad; incentivized the return to U.P. of Filipino PhDs from foreign institutions; and enhanced the rewards for research outputs. He created the Technology Transfer and Business Development Office (TTBDO) to institutionalize efforts to commercialize intellectual properties resulting from research for the benefit of the researchers and the university.

Recognizing the role of the arts and humanities in developing a sense of national identity and unity among Filipinos, Pascual implemented the Cultural Infrastructure Development Program (CIDP) in 2014 with government funding of close to ₱400 million. CIDP provided the funding for the rehabilitation and upgrading of cultural facilities in various campuses for performing arts and creative works.

To internationalize U.P., Pascual initiated in 2014 the shift of the U.P. academic calendar to an August start in order to synchronize it with its partner universities in ASEAN and in other parts of the world. He launched the programs for student exchange (MOVE U.P.), and for research collaboration by faculty and postgraduate students (COOPERATE). More funds were made available for international travel grants for paper presentation, and for bringing to U.P. eminent world leaders under the World Expert Lecture Series. He introduced international quality assurance of degree programs to benchmark U.P. against the best in the region.

To strengthen public service, he created the U.P. Padayon Public Service Office which organized disaster relief operations and provided training in disaster management, among others. He pursued arrangements for U.P. to provide technical assistance and policy studies support to government departments and offices, local government units, and other public universities. launched the U.P. Television on the Internet (TVUP) to fill the vacuum of reliable and university-based TV programs in the country. The university also entered into an agreement with the ABS-CBN Broadcasting Network, known as the "Fact-Check" project for faculty members to appear regularly in forums related to the 2013 Philippine general election.

Pascual created over 800 One-U.P. Professorial Chairs and Faculty Grants in 2015; these are annual grants awarded for three years, renewable based on performance.

In the area of finance and administration, Pascual raised for U.P. substantial resources through government budget allocations, donations, and revenue-generating projects. When he assumed the U.P. Presidency, funding from the government was declining. But he campaigned for and succeeded in getting big increases in government funding for U.P. The U.P. budget for operating expenses, in particular, has quadrupled. Around P12 billion has been allocated for modernizing the physical and cyber infrastructure of U.P. campuses (funding about 80 new buildings and 60 major renovations) and upgrading the hospital equipment of the Philippine General Hospital (PGH).

Among the major donations that Pascual got for U.P. are the land and the building for the new U.P. Bonifacio Global City (UP-BGC) campus from the Bases Conversion and Development Authority (BCDA) and a business group, respectively. Now operational, UP-BGC provides those working in BGC and nearby areas convenient access to U.P.’s professional programs in law, business, industrial engineering, statistics, etc. Other donations are a 400-seat theater in U.P. Diliman from a businessman alumnus; a completed 4-storey dormitory in U.P. Manila donated from a fraternity and a sorority; a 70-hectare site for a U.P. campus in New Clark City also from BCDA; a 5-hectare site and academic building for the U.P. Alabang technology hub donated from an alumni family; and a 3-hectare site and a building from a Mindanao-based business group for an extension campus of U.P. Los Baños in Panabo.

Pascual forged partnerships with the private sector to build revenue-generating projects, such as the U.P. Town Center in Diliman. The commercial center generates hundreds of millions of pesos annually for the university, which are used to fund programs not eligible for government funding (e.g., enhanced personnel benefits for retirement and hospitalization). Pascual rolled out e-UP, a system-wide integrated information system designed to achieve administrative efficiency, sharpen decision making, and strengthen control. The project included substantial investments in hardware, fiber optic networks, and internet bandwidth to also support the academic requirements of faculty and students.

=== As Secretary of Trade and Industry ===
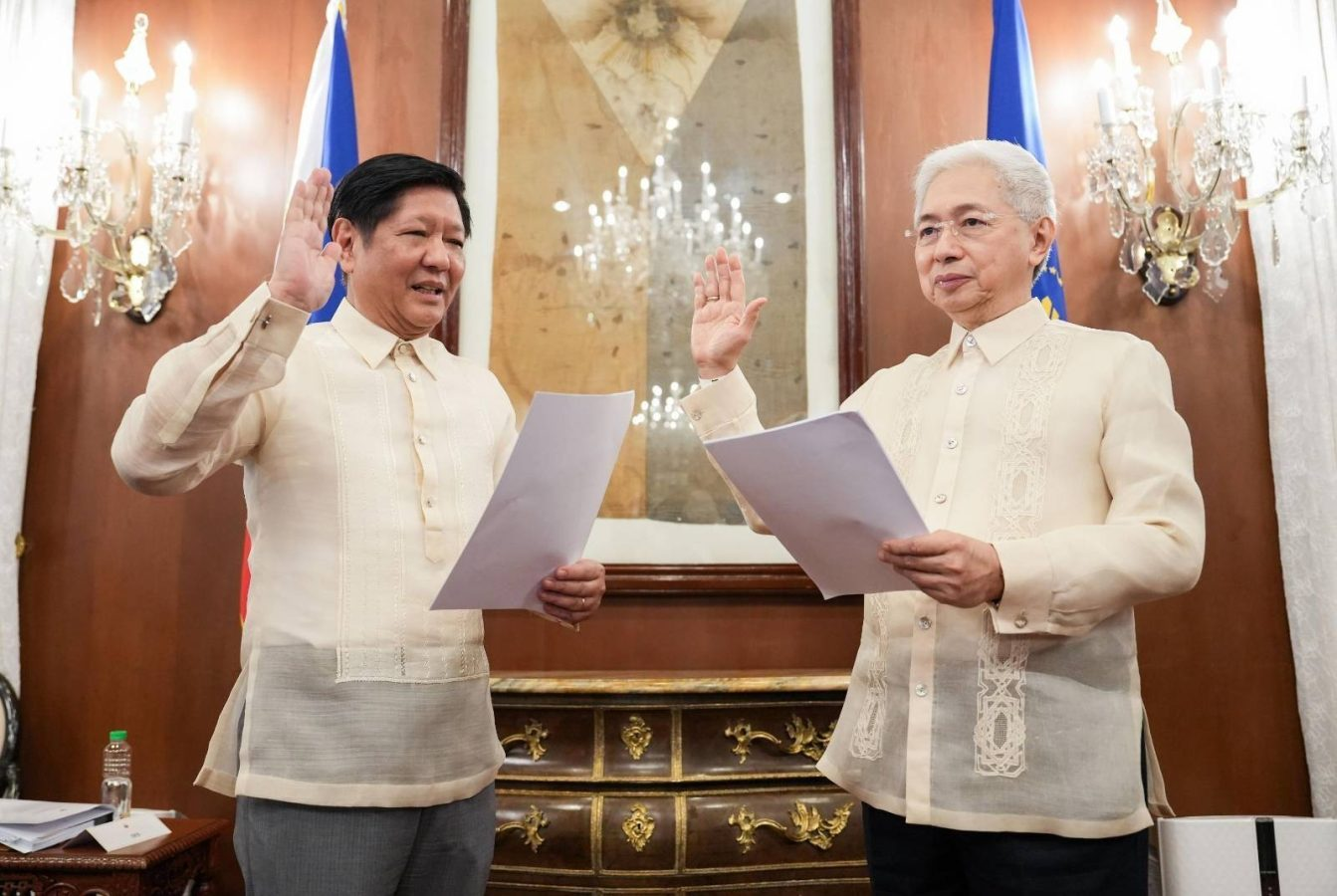
Pascual being sworn in as the Department of Trade and Industry (DTI) Secretary before President Bongbong Marcos on Malacañan Palace, December 16, 2022

In May 2022, then President-elect Bongbong Marcos announced that he would nominate Pascual to be his Secretary of Trade and Industry. He assumed the post on June 30, 2022, following the inauguration of Marcos albeit in an ad interim capacity, pending confirmation from the Commission on Appointments. His nomination, however, was bypassed twice by the Commission—first in September due to time constraints, and then in December due to concerns raised by Representative Johnny Pimentel and Senator Imee Marcos regarding the Philippine Economic Zone Authority, an attached agency of the Department of Trade and Industry. He was reappointed by Marcos Jr. and was sworn again on December 16. He was eventually confirmed by the Commission in February 2023.

As the DTI Secretary, Pascual worked to foster innovation-driven industrialization, promote trade and investment, nurture MSMEs, and ensure consumer protection while navigating the country toward a more sustainable and inclusive economy. During his tenure, the DTI launched a series of successful investment roadshows across the globe. These initiatives significantly boosted the country’s visibility on the international stage, drawing investments in key sectors.

On July 31, 2024, the Presidential Communications Office announced his resignation as he plans to move back to the private sector. On August 31, 2024, Pascual was named as an independent director of Banco de Oro.

== Affiliations ==
Pascual was the lead convenor of the Automated Election System (AES) Watch, an independent, multi-sector coalition that monitored and assessed the Philippines’ first-ever nationwide poll automation in May 2010.

He served as a trustee of the International Rice Research Institute (IRRI) and the Philippine Institute for Development Studies (PIDS), and as Chairperson of the U.P. Foundation and the U.P. Provident Fund, among others.

Pascual is a Life Member of the MAP and the Financial Executives Institute of the Philippines (FINEX), and a past president of the Rotary Club of Makati. He is also a member and has served on the board of the Philippine Council for Foreign Relations (PCFR) and the Shareholders' Association of the Philippines, Inc. (SharePHIL).

Pascual is an independent director of Banco de Oro who replaced Walter Wassmer.

== Awards ==
Pascual's accomplishments as U.P. President were recognized with the Presidential Lingkod Bayan Award in 2014 from the Philippine President, the Rotary Golden Wheel Award for Higher Education in 2013, and the Lifetime Distinguished Achievement Award from the U.P. Alumni Association in 2017. For his achievements as U.P. President, he was also given by the Asia CEO Awards in 2018 the recognition as Circle of Excellence awardee for the category Global Filipino Executive of the Year.

Pascual was also conferred an honorary Doctor of Laws by the University of the Philippines in 2020; an honorary Doctor of Pedagogy by the Angeles University in Angeles, Pampanga, Philippines in 2012; an honorary Doctor of Sciences by the Pamantasan ng Lungsod ng Maynila (University of the City of Manila) in 2015; an honorary Doctor of Humanities by Partido State University in 2016; and a PhD in Social Science (honoris causa) by Shu-Te University, Taiwan in 2016.

In October 2024, Pascual was conferred the Arangkada Lifetime Achievement Award for 2024 by the Joint Foreign Chambers of the Philippines (JFC) in recognition of his "44 years of public service, especially his most recent achievements as the former Secretary of Trade and Industry."

Academic offices
Preceded by Emerlinda R. Roman	President of the University of the Philippines; 2011–2017	Succeeded by Danilo Concepcion
Political offices
Preceded by Ramon Lopez	Secretary of Trade and Industry; 2022–2024	Succeeded by Maria Cristina Aldeguer-Roque (Acting)
