= Emanuel V. Soriano =

Filipino academic administrator (1936–2023)

14th President of the University of the Philippines
- In office 1979–1981
- Preceded by: Onofre Corpuz
- Succeeded by: Edgardo Angara

Personal details
- Born: December 30, 1936 Cebu City, Commonwealth of the Philippines
- Died: April 22, 2023 (aged 86)
- Relations: Eli Soriano (cousin); Daniel Razon (nephew)
- Education: Harvard University; Harvard Business School (DBA); University of the Philippines (B.S., M.I.M.)
- Occupation: University administrator; business expert; mechanical engineer
- Profession: Academic administrator

Emanuel V. Soriano (December 30, 1936 – April 22, 2023) was a Filipino engineer and academic administrator who was the 14th president of the University of the Philippines. He was one of the pioneer faculty members of the College of Business Administration, and among the first Filipinos to be sent to the United States for advanced studies in business like former College of Business Administration deans Jaime C. Laya (who was the 5th Governor of the Central Bank of the Philippines from 1981 to 1984), Magdaleno B. Albarracin, Jr. (now member of the Board of Regents), and Rafael A. Rodriguez (now Professor Emeritus).

Formerly a longtime supporter of President Ferdinand Marcos, Soriano wrote an "open letter" published in Manila's Business Day newspaper on September 5, 1983. He called for Marcos to resign in the wake of the assassination of opposition leader Benigno Aquino Jr. while in military custody and questioned the impartiality of the commission investigating the slaying.

He was one of the opposition leaders from 1983 to 1986 and was a prime mover of the Convenors Group that was instrumental in paving the way for the selection of Cory Aquino as the opposition candidate against Marcos in the 1985–1986 Snap Elections. He also served as a faculty member of the Asian Institute of Management until 1996.

Soriano earned his B.S. in mechanical engineering and Master in Industrial Management degrees from the University of the Philippines, and his Doctor of Business Administration (DBA) degree from Harvard Business School.

Soriano was appointed by President Corazon Aquino as her first National Security Director in October 1986, amid rumors of the coup plot which would be disclosed a month later. His appointment was formalized by the president who, at the same time, placed him as head of a Cabinet Crisis Committee, created during a Cabinet meeting on January 28, 1987, following another coup attempt.

It was during Soriano's term when his effort for the recovery of hidden gold caused a controversy. In September 1988, special prosecutor Raul Gonzalez revealed to the media the fund transfer involving checks by the International Precious Metal (IPM), the firm contracted to gold mining at Fort Santiago, which was supervised by Soriano. It was reported that ₱2.3 million was transferred from IPM to Soriano's personal bank account. President Aquino denied issuing a clearance for such. Despite calls by various groups for his resignation, Soriano still served as the national security adviser until being replaced by Rafael Ileto in February 1989.

One of his first cousins was Bro. Eli Soriano, who was the overall servant (presiding minister) of the Members Church of God International until his death in February 2021.

Soriano died on April 22, 2023, at the age of 86.

Academic offices
| Preceded by Onofre D. Corpuz | President of the University of the Philippines; 1979–1981 | Succeeded by Edgardo Angara |
