= Ernesto Tabujara =

Filipino scholar and engineer (d. 2014)

Chancellor of the University of the Philippines Diliman
- In office 1983–1990

Personal details
- Died: June 20, 2014 (aged 85–86)
- Occupation: Scholar; engineer; academic administrator

Ernesto Tabujara (died 20 June 2014 at 85 years old) was a Filipino scholar and engineer. formerly the Chancellor of the University of the Philippines Diliman from 1983 to 1990. As chancellor, he separated the school's College of Arts and Sciences into the College of Arts and Letters, the College of Science, and the College of Social Sciences and Philosophy, and also started 5 different schools of the university. He also designed the Philippine International Convention Center.
