= José Abueva =

Filipino political scientist (1928–2021)

Jose Veloso Abueva
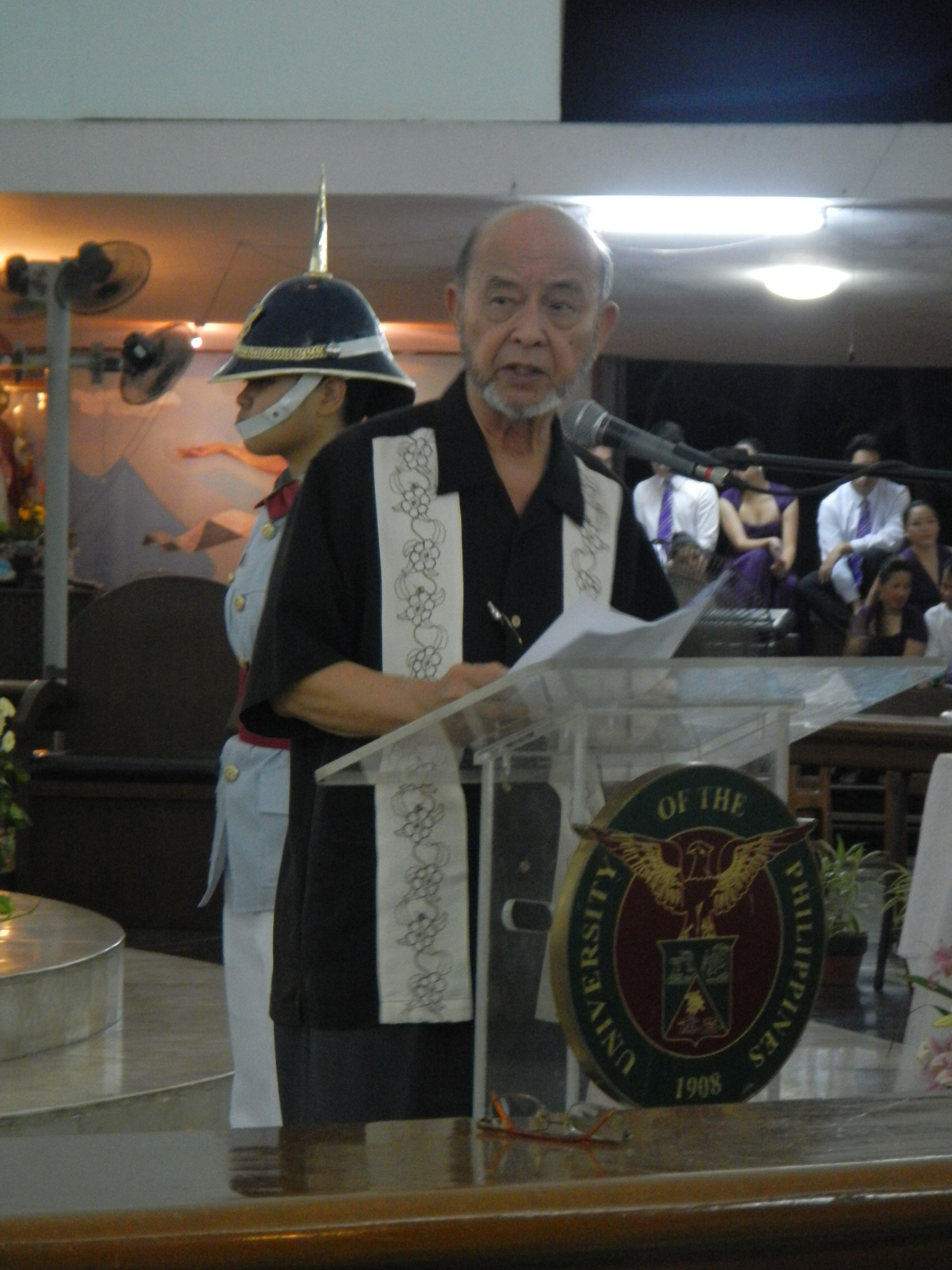
- Jose V. Abueva (Onofre Corpuz April 1, 2013 eulogy)

16th President of the University of the Philippines
- In office 1987–1993
- President: Corazon Aquino
- Preceded by: Edgardo Angara
- Succeeded by: Emil Q. Javier

3rd Chancellor of the University of the Philippines Diliman Concurrently President of the University of the Philippines
- In office 1990–1991
- President: Corazon Aquino
- Preceded by: Ernesto Tabujara
- Succeeded by: Emerlinda Roman

Personal details
- Born: Jose Veloso Abueva; May 25, 1928 Tagbilaran, Bohol, Philippine Islands
- Died: August 18, 2021 (aged 93) Antipolo, Rizal, Philippines
- Spouse: Socorro Encarnacion Abueva
- Children: 4
- Parent(s): Teodoro Abueva; Purificacion Veloso
- Education: University of Michigan (MPA, PhD in political science); University of the Philippines (BA in law)
- Occupation: University administrator, professor, political scientist
- Profession: Academe

José Veloso Abueva (May 25, 1928 – August 18, 2021) was a Filipino political scientist and public administration scholar who served as the 16th president of the University of the Philippines. A Ten Outstanding Young Men (TOYM) awardee for political science in 1962, he has devoted much of his career in academic circles. He has been faculty member of the National College of Public Administration and Governance of the University of the Philippines Diliman and visiting professor at Brooklyn College, City University of New York and Yale University. He has also worked with the United Nations University in Tokyo. Abueva's service to the nation includes stints as secretary of the 1971 Constitutional Convention, executive director of the Legislative-Executive Local Government Reform Commission and Chairman of the Legislative-Executive Council that drew up the conversion program for former military bases. Abueva wrote a number of books, including Focus in the Barrio: The Foundation of the Philippine Community Development Program and Ang Filipino sa Siglo 21. Among the publications he has edited is the 20-volume PAMANA: The UP Anthology of Filipino Socio-Political Thought since 1872.

Abueva was a professor emeritus of political science and public administration at the University of the Philippines Diliman. He also chaired the advisory board of the Citizens Movement for a Free Philippines. He was appointed by President Gloria Macapagal Arroyo as chairman of the consultative constitutional commission in the Philippines. He was also a strong supporter of federalism and parliamentary government for the Philippines.

He formed the team of analysts of Pulse Asia, a public opinion polling body in the Philippines.

Abueva was the founder and former president of Kalayaan College.

== Biography and career ==
Abueva was born in Tagbilaran City, Bohol, on May 25, 1928, to Teodoro Lloren Abueva, a former Bohol congressman and Purificacion (Nena) Veloso, head of Bohol's Women's Club and women's suffrage campaign.

As a young boy of 16 during World War II in the Philippines, he had to search for his parents, who were taken by the Japanese, eventually finding them dead.

Abueva has six other brothers and sisters: Teodoro (Teddy), Jr., (dec.); Purificacion (Neny - dec.), married to Atty. Ramon Binamira (dec.) of Tagbilaran City; Napoleon Abueva (Billy), Philippines National Artist for sculpture; Amelia (Inday) Martinez, now living in Chicago; Teresita (Ching) Floro, now living in Sydney, Australia; and Antonio (Tony), a landscape artist.

Abueva served as president of the University of the Philippines in 1987–1993. He introduced the Socialized Tuition Fee Assistance Program (STFAP) in 1987. Abueva also institutionalized a Filipino language policy within the university.

He was a president of Kalayaan College as well as U.P. Professor of Political Science and Public Administration.

Abueva was married to Ma Socorro (Coring) Encarnacion Abueva (dec.) from Surigao and Manila. Their children are Lanelle, Jobert, Rosanna and Jonas.

Abueva died on August 18, 2021, in Antipolo, Rizal.

== Significant contributions to Philippine governance ==
On September 4, 2007, the Presidential Task Force on Education under the Office of the President named Bienvenido Nebres, chairman. Nebres was joined by 4 others—Angeles University Foundation president Emmanuel Angeles, Philippine Chamber of Commerce and Industry president Donald Dy, Asian Institute of Management professor Victor Limlingan, and former University of the Philippines president Jose Abueva. The 5 with Education Secretary Jesli Lapus, Romulo Neri, and Augusto Syjuco, complete the task force. Gloria Macapagal Arroyo signed Executive Order 635 on August 24 creating a presidential task force to assess, plan and monitor the entire educational system.

== Quotes ==
- "There were many reasons (for the proposal to scrap the 2007 polls). That is just one of them." (referring to popularity)
- "Our electoral system may not be reformed at that time (2007). This would raise questions on the credibility of the elections."
- "I respect his (Ramos) opinion but I am standing with the commission's recommendation. He is entitled to his opinions but we should look at the substantive proposals."
- "Throughout history, there have been many leaders of war, but there have been few leaders of peace. I am determined to help change this."

Preceded by Edgardo Angara	President of the University of the Philippines; 1987–1993	Succeeded by Emil Q. Javier
