= University of the Philippines =

National University of the Philippines

- Unibersidad ng Pilipinas
- Latin: Universitas Philippinensis
- Other name: UP
- Motto: "Honor, Excellence, Service"
- Type: Public coeducational non-profit research higher education institution and national university system
- Established: June 18, 1908; 118 years ago
- Affiliations: Association of Pacific Rim Universities; Association of Southeast Asian Institutions of Higher Learning; ASEAN University Network; ASEAN-European University Network
- Budget: ₱22.695 billion (US$375 million) (2025)
- Chairperson: Shirley Agrupis
- President: Angelo Jimenez
- Faculty: 7,362 (2024)
- Students: 66,463 (2024)
- Undergraduates: 47,207 (2024)
- Postgraduates: 19,256 (2024)
- Other students: 2,936 (2024)
- Location: Philippines
- Campus: 26,309.5416 ha (65,012.293 acres); Multiple sites
- Language: English
- Student Moniker: Isko (Male), Iska (Female), Iskolar ng Bayan or Scholar of the Nation (Gender Neutral)
- Newspaper: Philippine Collegian
- Colors: Maroon and green
- Nickname: Fighting Maroons
- Sporting affiliations: UAAP, STRASUC, BBEAL, RSCUAA XI, SCUAA Region VIII, SCUAA, CESAFI
- Mascot: Oble
- Website: up.edu.ph

UP Naming Mahal
- Performed by the UP Symphony Orchestra: file; help

The University of the Philippines (UP; Filipino: Unibersidad ng Pilipinas is a state public university system and the national university of the Philippines under Republic Act No. 9500. It was established on June 18, 1908, by the American colonial government through Act No. 1870 of the First Philippine Legislature.

The university's earliest academic units were established in Manila and Los Baños. In 1949, UP transferred several of its units to Diliman which became its new administrative center. In 1972, the university was reorganized into a multi-campus system of autonomous constituent universities.

Today, the UP System consists of nine constituent universities distributed across 23 campuses nationwide: UP Diliman, UP Los Baños, UP Manila, UP Visayas, UP Mindanao, UP Open University, UP Baguio, UP Cebu, and UP Tacloban.

UP also operates the Philippine General Hospital, the country's largest tertiary hospital. It likewise maintains specialized research and public service institutions involved in healthcare, natural sciences, agriculture, technology, and other fields of national importance.

== History ==
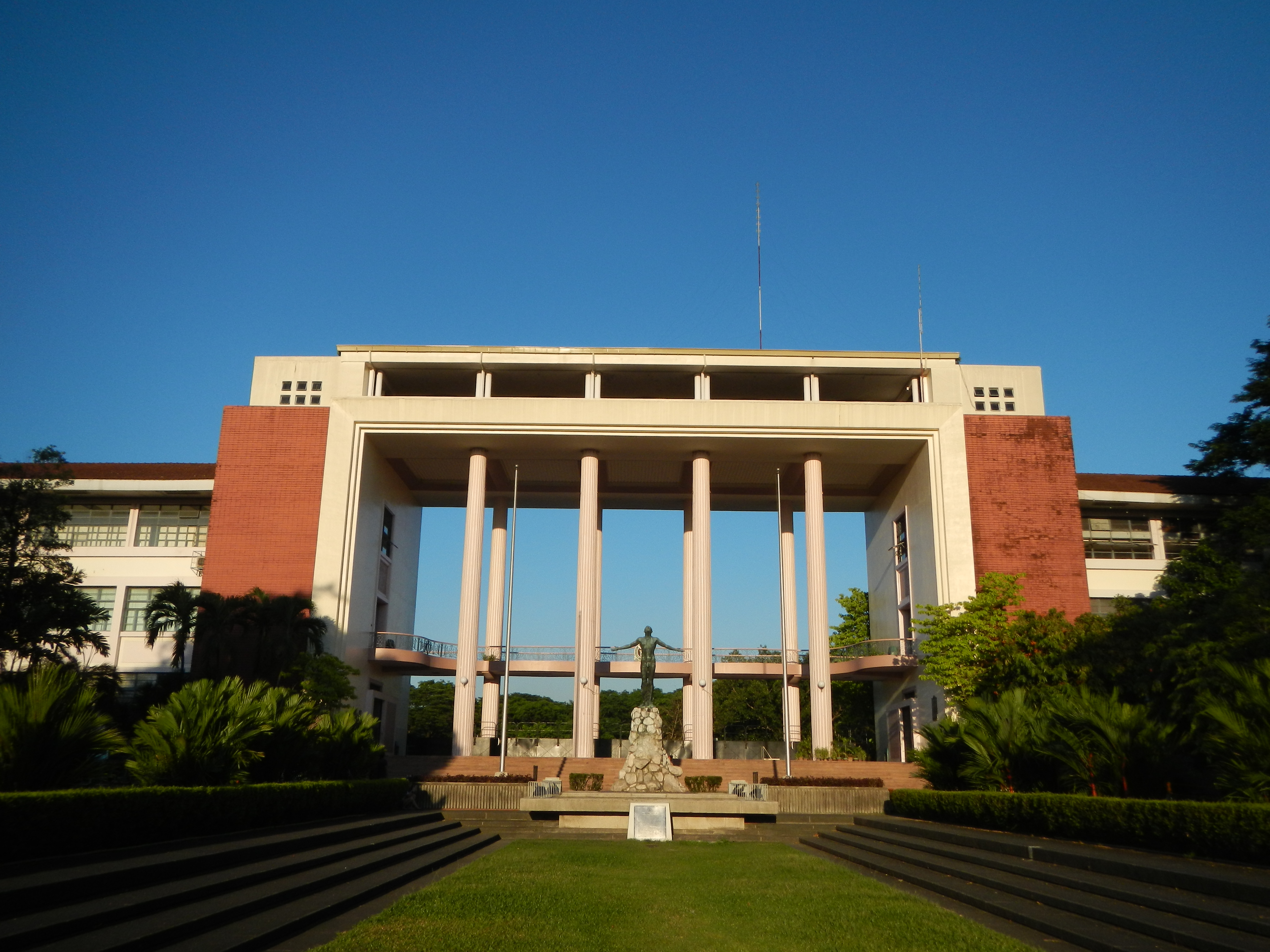
UP Diliman

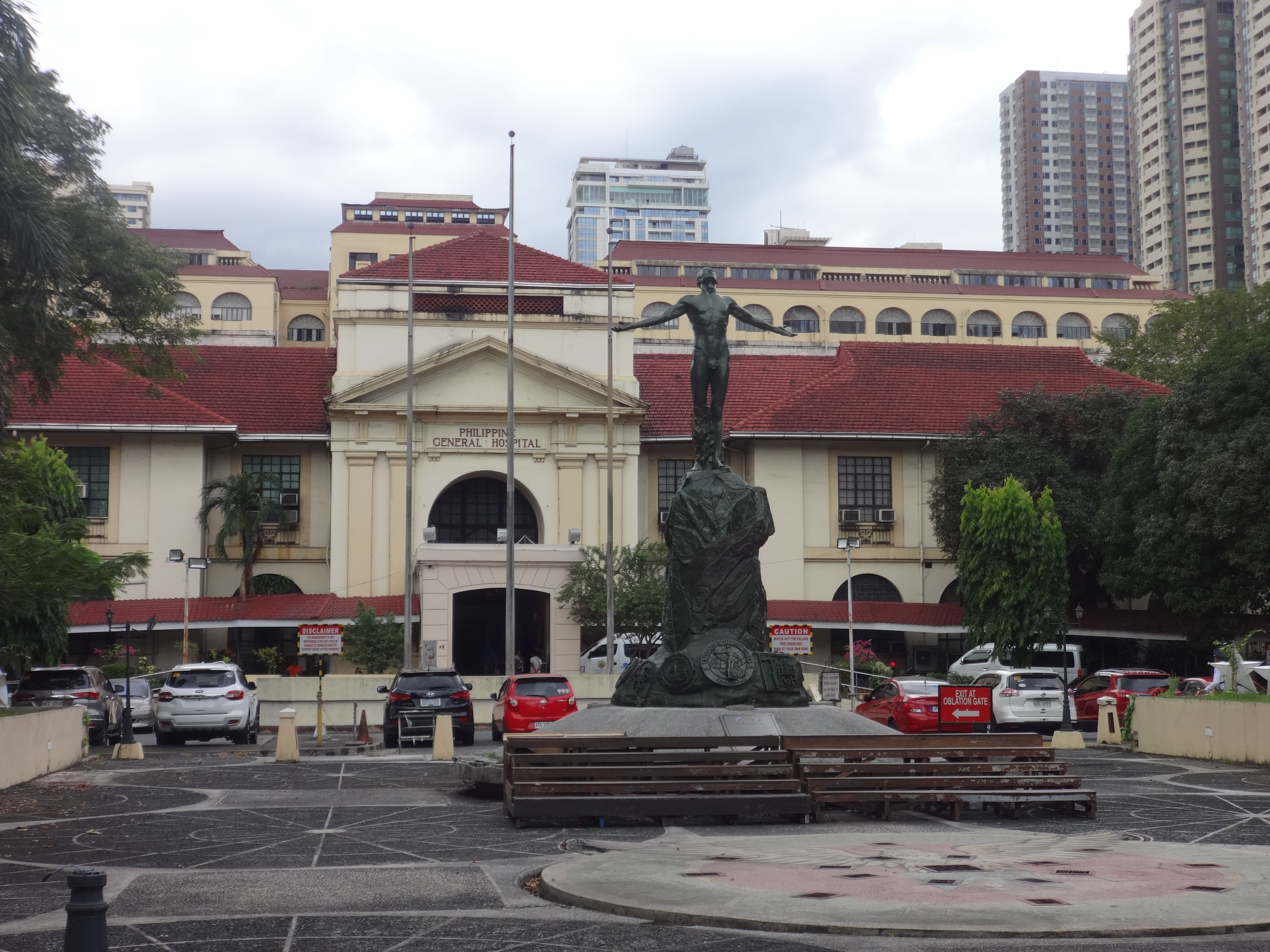
UP Manila

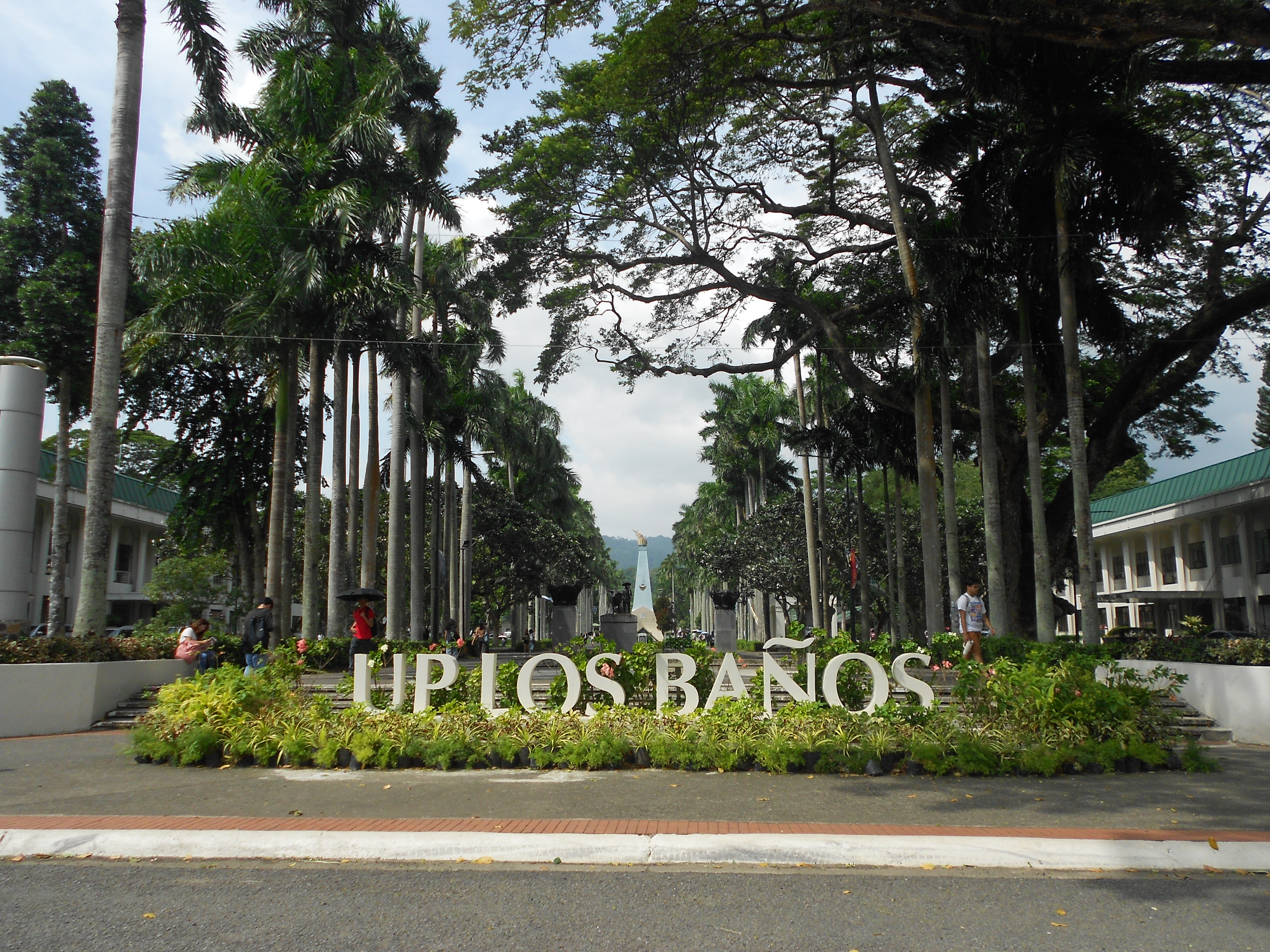
UP Los Baños

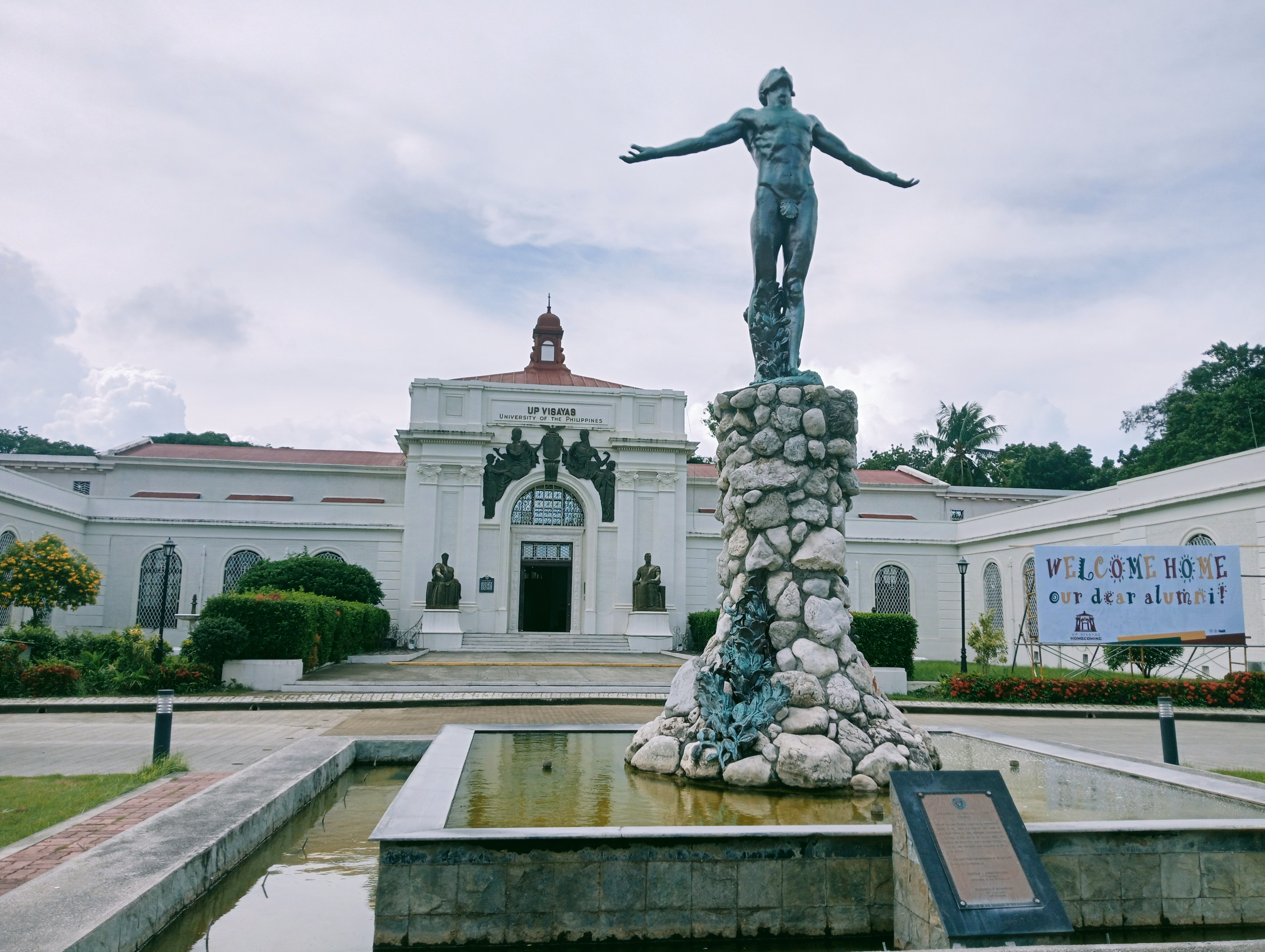
UP Visayas in Iloilo City

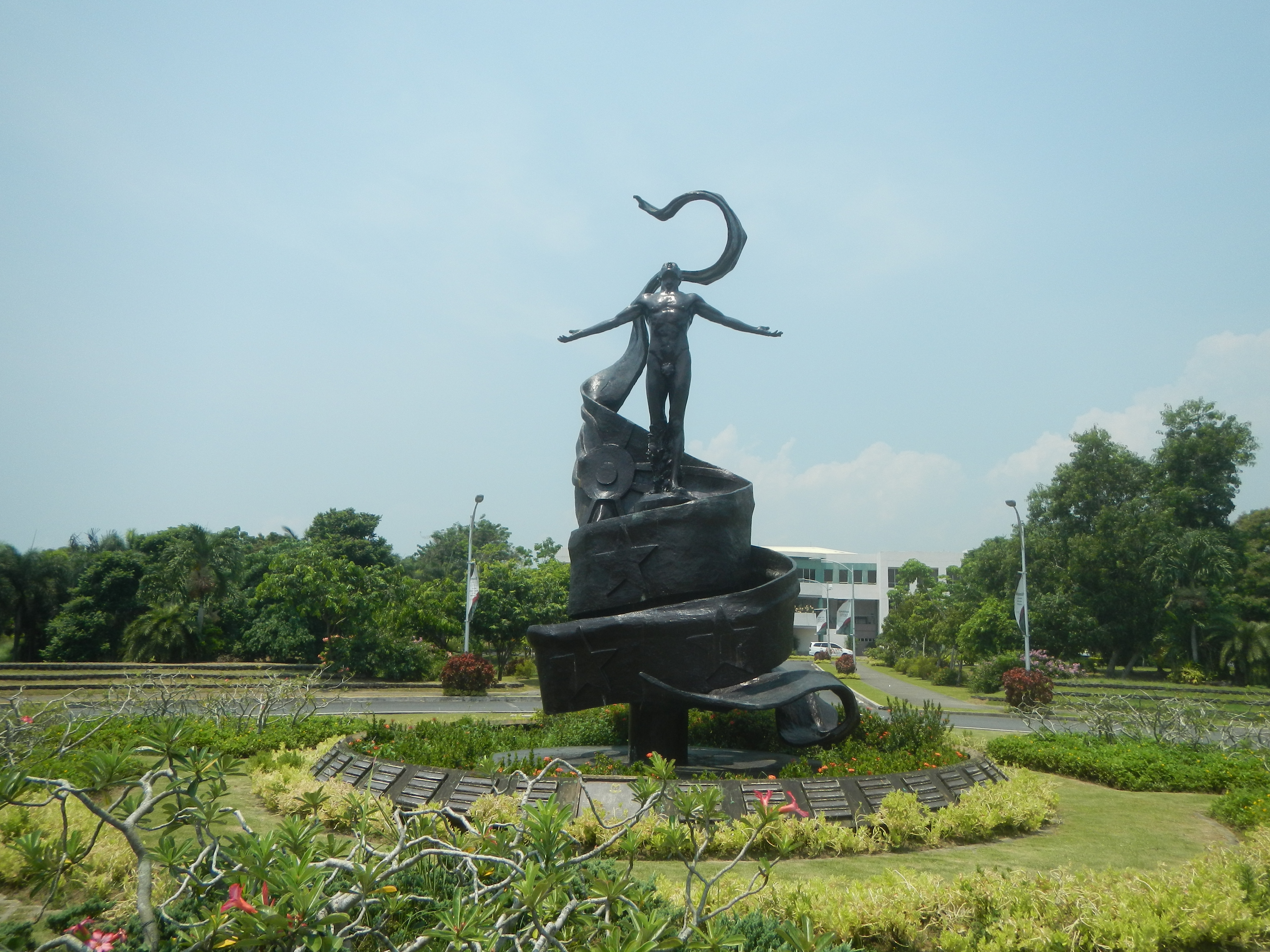
UP Open University

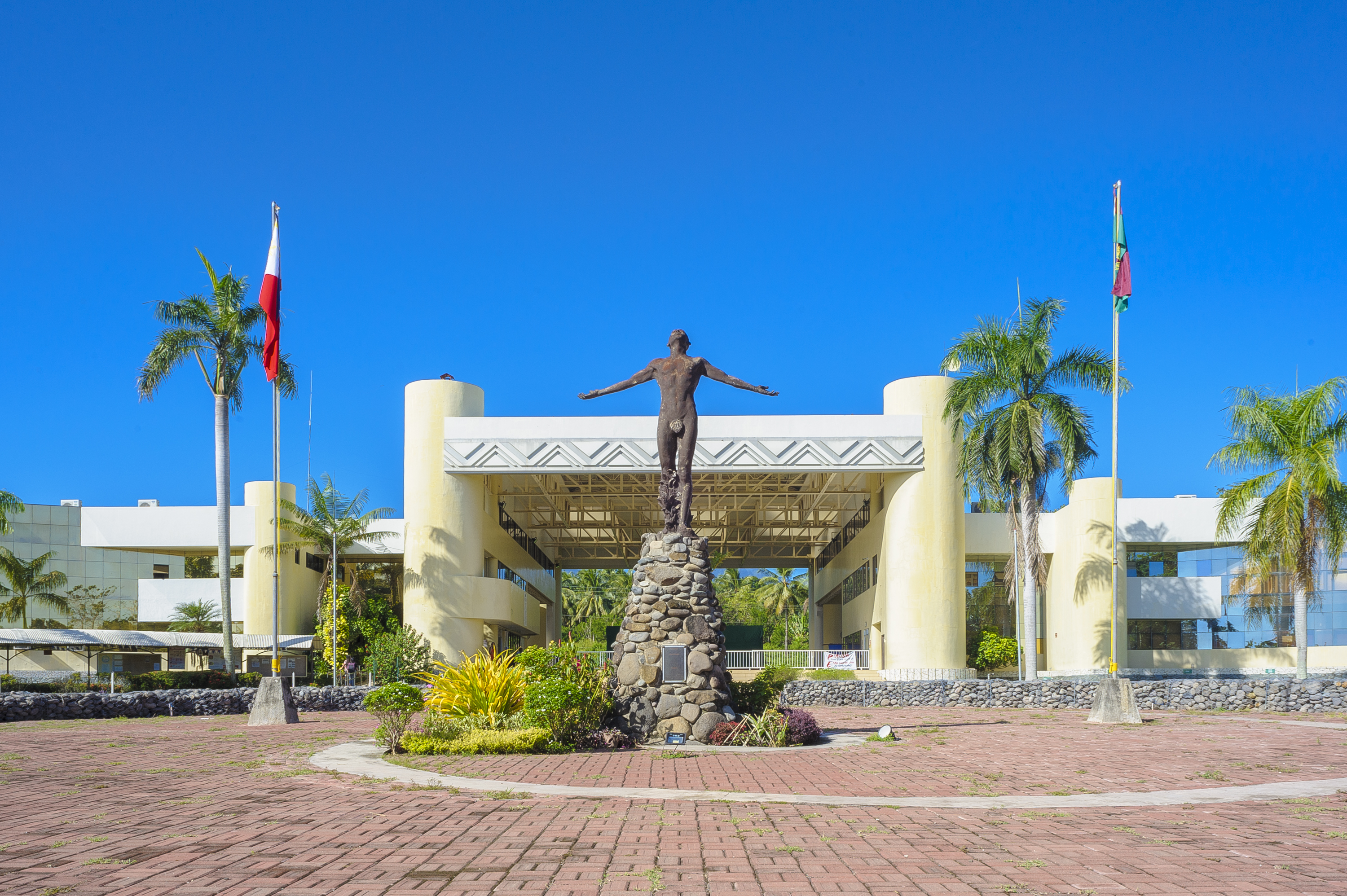
UP Mindanao in Davao City

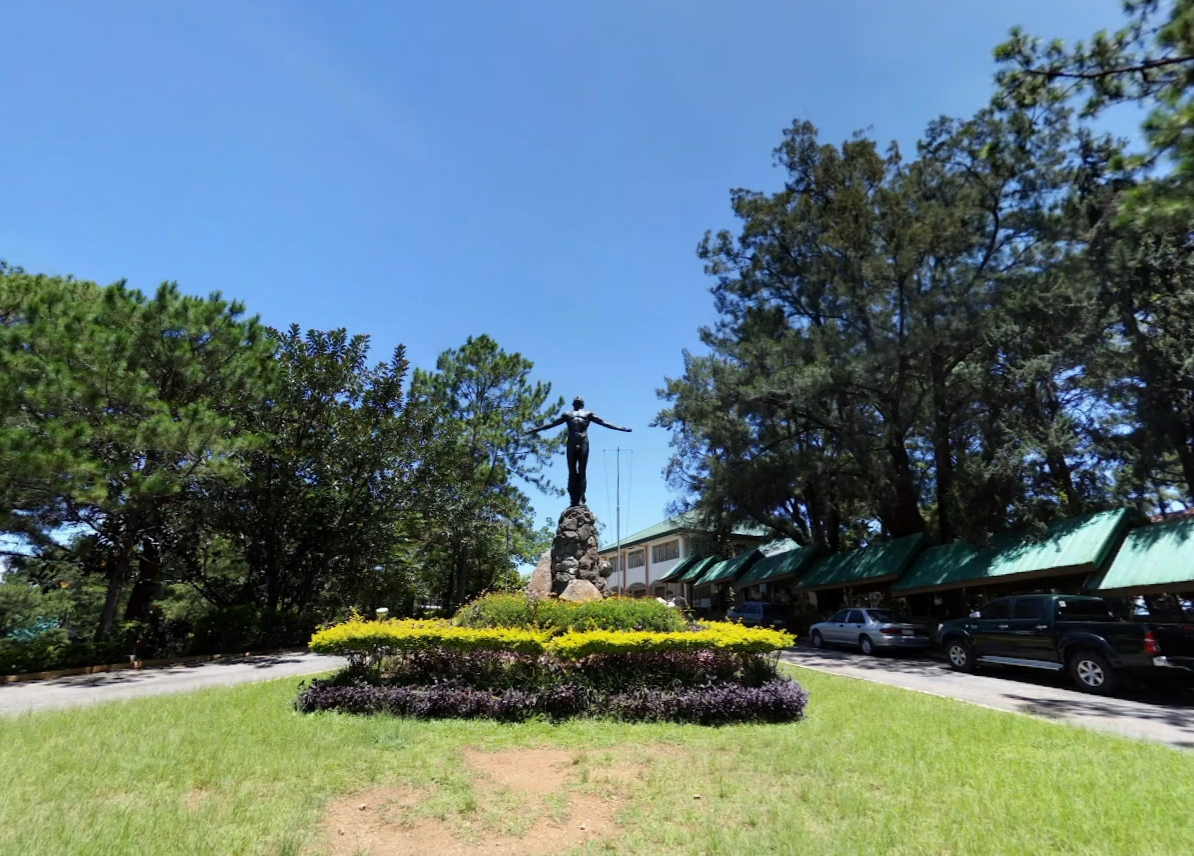
UP Baguio

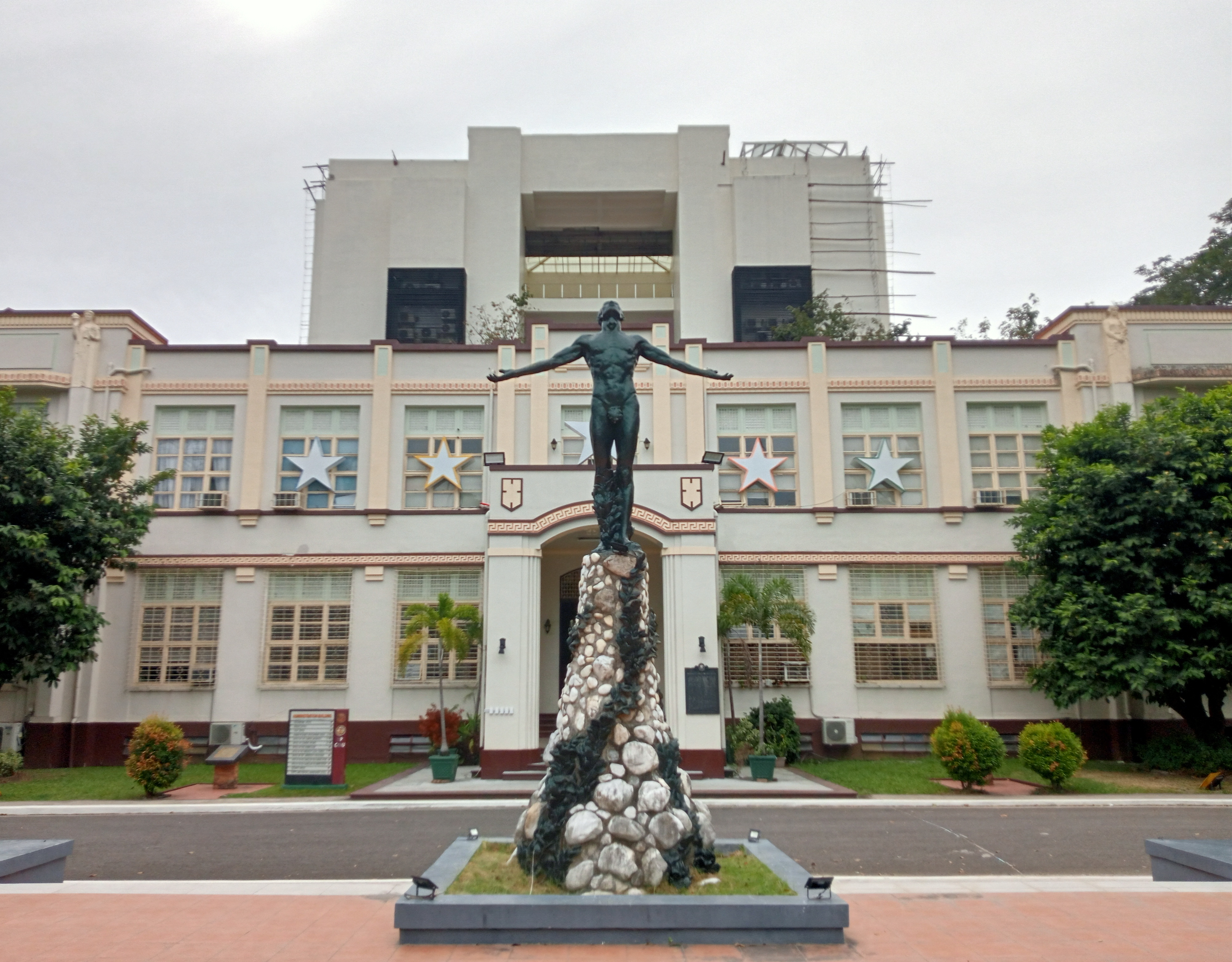
UP Cebu

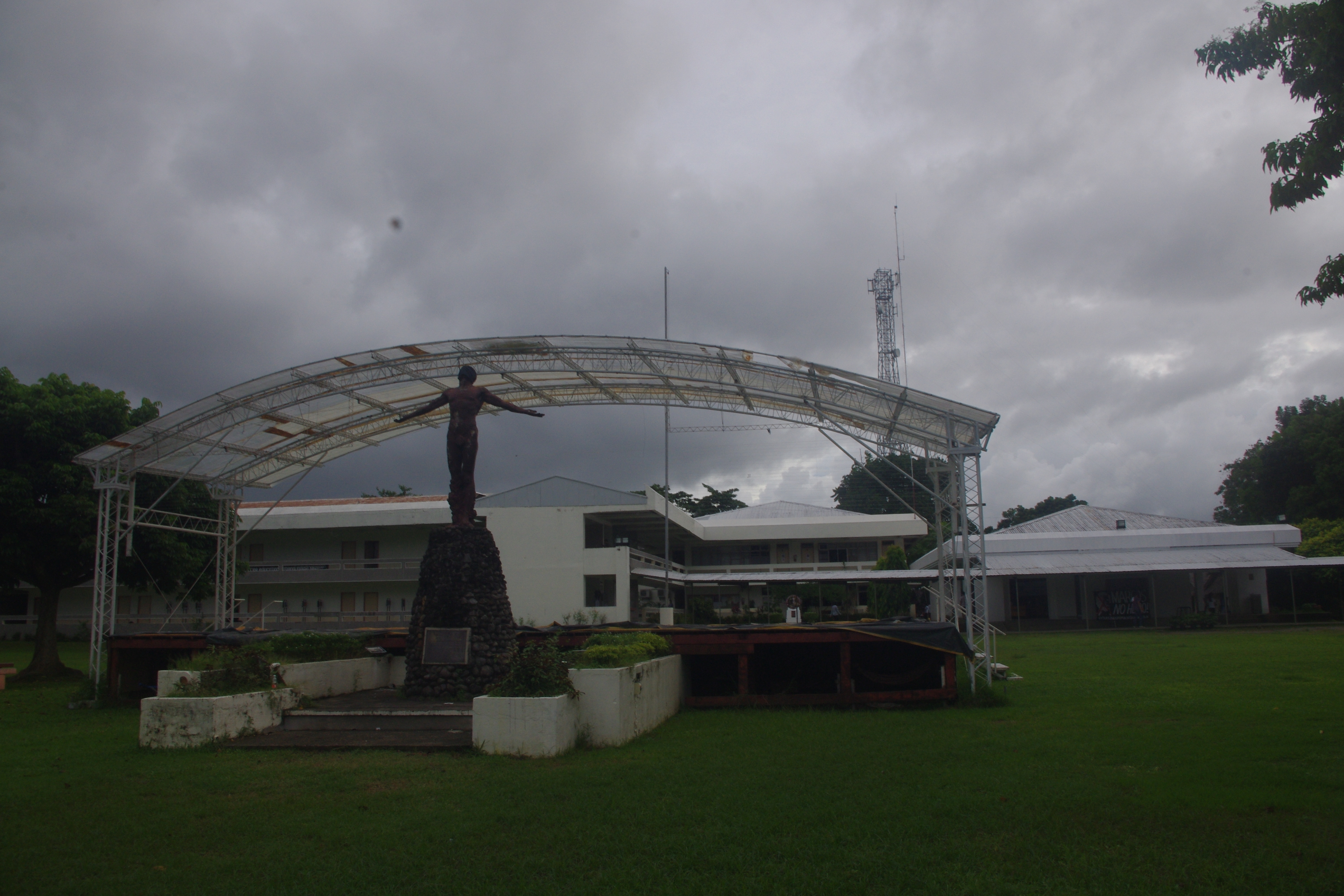
UP Tacloban

=== Origins and early history (1900s–1920s) ===
In the late 19th century, many Filipinos pursued higher education in Spain and other European universities, highlighting the absence of a comparable institution in the Philippines that could provide advanced instruction across various fields. To address this need, the University of the Philippines was established on June 18, 1908, through . Act No. 1870 of the First Philippine Legislature, otherwise known as the "University Act". It was envisioned as the country's premier institution of higher learning, with a mandate to provide "advanced instruction in literature, philosophy, the sciences, and the arts and to give professional and technical training," regardless of "age, sex, nationality, religious belief, or political affiliation." Judge Newton W. Gilbert acted as president of the university since its establishment in 1908.

The university began with the organization of its first academic units. The earliest established in 1909 were the College of Agriculture and the School of Fine Arts. These were soon followed in 1910 by the Colleges of Veterinary Medicine, Liberal Arts, Engineering, and Medicine and Surgery. The College of Law, founded in 1911, was the last of UP's founding academic units. Although the College of Medicine and Surgery officially became part of UP in 1910, it had already opened for instruction in 1907. This was in accordance with the University Act of 1908, which provided that the Philippine Medical School would be incorporated into UP as the College of Medicine and Surgery once two or more colleges had been established.

The academic units were initially spread across various locations, with most situated in Manila as it served as the main campus. The College of Agriculture was established in Los Baños, at the foot of Mount Makiling, while the School of Fine Arts opened in a private property on R. Hidalgo Street in Quiapo, Manila. The remaining units were also based in Manila: the College of Medicine and Surgery on Herran Street (now Pedro Gil Street), the College of Veterinary Medicine in Pandacan, the College of Liberal Arts held classes on several locations including the Philippine Normal School, the College of Engineering on the site that later formed part of the Padre Faura campus, and the College of Law in a private property on Isaac Peral Street (now United Nations Avenue). The School of Forestry was likewise established in 1910 in Los Baños. At the time, UP President Murray Bartlett declared that as a "University for the Filipino," the institution must be "supported by the people's money," guided by a charter framed by the people's representatives, and sustained by "the confidence and sympathy of the people."

=== Expansion to Diliman (1930s–1940s) ===
Plans to transfer academic units from the Manila campus to a new site were formally raised in 1937 to accommodate the university's growing needs, with President Manuel L. Quezon initiating the idea. Among the proposals considered was the relocation of certain Manila units to the Los Baños campus, though this was deliberated among university officials. By 1938, a property in Marikina (now part of Quezon City) owned by the Philippine National Bank emerged as a leading option. Eventually, the Board of Regents approved the establishment of a new campus in Diliman, Quezon City, where the university acquired a 493-hectare lot. Construction of the Diliman campus began in 1939 but was interrupted by the outbreak of World War II.

During World War II, most of its colleges had to be closed except the Colleges of Medicine, Pharmacy, and Engineering. Meanwhile, the Japanese Imperial Army occupied three Diliman campus buildings: the College of Liberal Arts Building (now Benitez Hall) and the Colleges of Law (now Malcolm Hall) and Business Administration Building. The Japanese also occupied the campus of the College of Agriculture in Los Baños. UP President Bienvenido Ma. Gonzalez sought a grant of ₱ 13 million from the US-Philippines War Damage Commission. A massive rehabilitation and construction effort was executed during the post-war years. For the first time, an extensive Diliman campus master plan and map were created in 1949. More buildings were built across the Diliman campus landscape: the University Library (Gonzalez Hall), the College of Engineering (Melchor Hall), the Women's Residence Hall (now Kamia Residence Hall), the Conservatory of Music (Abelardo Hall and now the College of Music), the Administration Building (Quezon Hall), and the UP President's Residence. Most colleges and administration offices were temporarily housed in huts and shelters made of sawali and galvanized iron.

The transfer of the university to its new campus in Diliman took place between December 16, 1948, and January 11, 1949, as scheduled, with classes resuming at the new site on January 12, 1949. During the quadragesimal anniversary celebration on February 11, 1949, the Oblation statue—the last movable property from the Manila campus—was formally relocated to Diliman. The transfer was marked by a motorcade of alumni and students.

=== Democratization and the Rise of Autonomous Units (1950s–1970s) ===
When UP President Salvador P. Lopez assumed office in 1969, he faced widespread social unrest and political instability in the Philippines, as well as internal turmoil within the university. The New People's Army was gaining ground, and labor strikes and student protests—fueled by rising oil prices and contentious government policies—became increasingly common among UP constituents. In 1972, President Marcos declared Martial Law, further intensifying the political climate.

Amid these tensions, a movement advocating for the autonomy of the Los Baños campus emerged, calling for its establishment as an independent agricultural university. Supporters cited perceived injustices from the Diliman administration, including the rejection of academic proposals that hindered college growth, as well as administrative and fiscal issues. Lopez opposed full separation, arguing that it would diminish the academic prestige of both UP as a whole and the Los Baños campus. Additionally, critics of the secession proposal pointed to the recommendation of the Presidential Commission to Survey Philippine Education (PCSPE), which endorsed UP as the national university. Removing the functions of the Los Baños campus, they argued, would undermine this role.

Lopez then advocated for democratization within the university and thus, the creation of the UP System with Los Baños as one of its autonomous universities. On November 20, 1972, Presidential Decree No. 58 established University of the Philippines Los Baños (UPLB) as the first autonomous constituent university of UP, granting it substantial administrative and fiscal autonomy. This marked the beginning of a multi-campus UP System envisioned to strengthen the university through a network of academic centers across the country.

On October 28, 1977, autonomy was likewise granted to the Health Sciences Center in Manila, which brought together UP's health-related academic units and the Philippine General Hospital under a unified organizational framework. This was followed on May 31, 1979, by the establishment of the University of the Philippines Visayas (UPV) as an autonomous university, with its main campus in Miagao, Iloilo, and the College of Fisheries as its flagship unit.

The presidency of Carlos P. Romulo (1962–1968) saw the establishment of several Diliman units, including the Population Institute, Law Center, and Applied Geodesy and Photogrammetry Training Center (1964); the Institute of Mass Communication, College of Business Administration, and Institute of Planning (1965); the Computer Center and Institute for Small-Scale Industries (1966); the Institute of Social Work and Community Development (1967); and the Asian Center (1968).

In Los Baños, the 1960s saw the establishment of international linkages, particularly through collaborations with the International Rice Research Institute (IRRI), founded in 1960, and the Southeast Asian Regional Center for Graduate Study and Research in Agriculture (SEARCA), founded in 1966. The campus also expanded its research and extension functions with the establishment of specialized units including the Dairy Training and Research Institute (1962), Institute of Plant Breeding (1975), National Crop Protection Center (1976), Post-Harvest Horticulture and Training Center (1977), and the National Institute of Molecular Biology and Biotechnology (1979), also known as BIOTECH. Several colleges and institutes were also established following the autonomy in 1972.

=== Institutional Development and Reforms (1980s) ===
On October 22, 1982, the Health Sciences Center of the Manila campus was renamed University of the Philippines Manila as other autonomous units are identified by their geographical locations. On April 26, 1982, UP Diliman was formally designated as a constituent university, almost a decade after the reorganization of UP Although Diliman was the seat of the UP Administration, the campus was not immediately constituted after 1972. It was administered, along with the Manila unit, prior to the organization of the Health Sciences Center, as a de facto university.

On March 23, 1983, Executive Order No. 889 established a system of National Centers of Excellence in the Basic Sciences within UP. The mandate authorized the Board of Regents to formally organize these centers by elevating existing academic units and programs to bolster the country's scientific manpower. Under this system, the National Institute of Physics (NIP), the National Institute of Geological Sciences (NIGS), and the Natural Sciences Research Institute (NSRI) were designated as national centers in UP Diliman. Concurrently, the Institute of Mathematical Sciences, Institute of Chemistry (IC), and the Institute of Biological Sciences (IBS) were established as national centers in UP Los Baños. This reorganization provided these units with specialized funding and administrative flexibility to lead national research and development efforts.

UP President José Abueva introduced the Socialized Tuition Fee Assistance Program (STFAP) in 1987. Abueva also institutionalized a Filipino language policy within the university. He signed a landmark agreement with then-Defense Secretary Fidel V. Ramos. Known as the UP-DND Accord, it restricted the entry of military and police forces into UP campuses without prior notification to the university administration.

=== Expansion of the UP System (1990s) ===
Emil Q. Javier, an agricultural scientist and former chancellor of UP Los Baños, served as president of the UP System from 1993 to 1999. During his term, initiatives in distance education were pursued, which later contributed to the establishment of the UP Open University. His administration also oversaw the expansion and strengthening of the UP System through the establishment of UP Mindanao, the National Institutes of Biotechnology across major UP constituents, the National Institutes of Health in UP Manila, and the creation of Ugnayan ng Pahinungod, the university's volunteer service program.

UP Mindanao was established in Davao City on February 20, 1995, through Republic Act 7889, following advocacy from alumni and local lawmakers. Its mandate emphasizes science, technology, and agricultural education. The law also directs the university to implement affirmative action and scholarship programs for Muslim students and cultural communities, while collaborating with other state institutions to support regional development. Since opening in 1996, the university has produced graduates through its College of Humanities and Social Sciences, College of Science and Mathematics, and School of Management.

=== The UP Charter and centennial (2000s) ===
Francisco Nemenzo, a political scientist at UP Diliman and former chancellor of UP Visayas, served as the 18th president of the university from 1999 to 2005. His administration introduced the Revitalized General Education Program (RGEP) and institutionalized expanded incentives for faculty research and creative work.

In 2005, Emerlinda R. Roman, a professor of business administration and former chancellor of UP Diliman, became the first woman to lead the university system. Her presidency coincided with the 2008 UP Centennial, during which she led a campaign to fund the modernization of university services and facilities. This period was also marked by the appointment of several faculty members from the College of Business Administration to administrative leadership positions, including roles in the UP System Budget Office, the UP Provident Fund, and the UP Foundation. A significant milestone of her term was the passage of the UP Charter of 2008 (Republic Act 9500), which formally designated the institution as the national university.

==== Centennial celebration ====
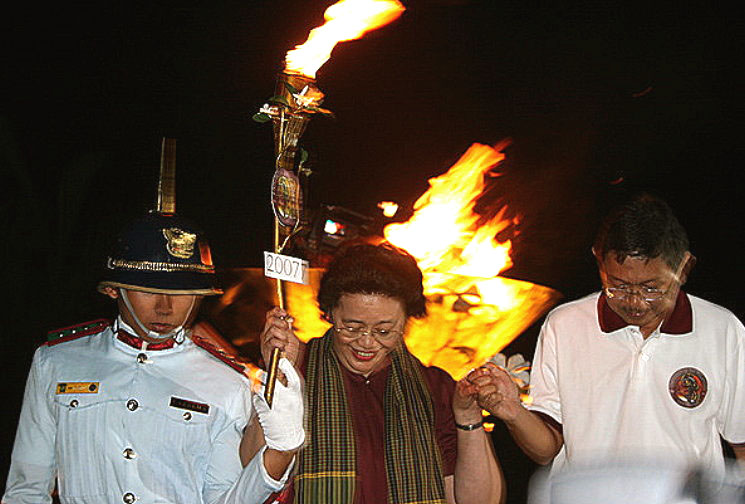
Former Commission on Higher Education chair Romulo Neri (right) assist former UP President Emerlinda R. Roman as she descends from the staircase that led to the lighting of the Centennial Flame during the kickoff of the centennial celebration in Diliman.

On January 8, 2008, the University of the Philippines began its centennial celebration. The opening ceremony featured a 100-torch relay to light the eternal flame on the Centennial Cauldron at Quezon Hall. Torches were carried by, among others, Fernando Javier, 100, of Baguio, the oldest UP alumnus (Civil Engineering from University of the Philippines Manila, 1933), Michael Dumlao, a 6th-grader from the University of the Philippines Integrated School in UP Diliman and UP President Emerlinda Roman, the first woman president of the university. The Centennial Cauldron features three pillars to represent the three core values, and seven flowers representing the seven constituent universities, i.e. UP Manila, UP Diliman (together with UP Pampanga, its extension campus), UP Los Baños, UP Baguio, UP Visayas, UP Mindanao, and UP Open University.

The Bangko Sentral ng Pilipinas (BSP) and UP issued commemorative ₱ 100 UP Centennial notes at the BSP Security Plant Complex in Quezon City. The notes appear as four-outs (four uncut pieces) in a folder featuring the signatures of all UP presidents including Roman.

Inspired by the UP Oblation, the University of the Philippines Alumni Association (UPAA) launched an art exhibit, "100 Nudes/100 Years" featuring the works of nine UP alumni national artists.

==== UPAA 2008 centennial yearbook ====
The University of the Philippines Alumni Association announced its launch of a three-volume UPA.A. 2008 Centennial Yearbook on June 21, 2008, at the U.P.A.A. Grand Alumni-Faculty Homecoming and Reunion at the Araneta Coliseum, Cubao, Quezon City. The theme is "U.P. Alumni: Excellence, Leadership and Service in the Next 100 Years," with the three cover designs showing the works of National Artists Napoleon Abueva, Abdulmari Asia Imao, and Benedicto Cabrera, respectively. Chief Justice Reynato Puno is the Yearbook's most distinguished alumnus awardee (among 46 other awardees).

==== UP Charter of 2008 ====
The UP Charter of 2008, Republic Act No. 9500, was signed by President Gloria Macapagal Arroyo into law on April 29, 2008, at the UP Library Conference Hall in Lahug, Cebu. It aims "to provide both institutional and fiscal autonomy to UP, specifically, to protect student's democratic access and strengthen administration through the recognition of UP System's Board of Regents and UP Council." The new charter declared UP as the Philippines' national university, giving it "the enhanced capability to fulfill its mission and spread the benefits of knowledge." The new charter will help improve its competitiveness. The newly designated "national university" however, needs ₱ 3.6 billion to be on a par with other universities in the region.

=== UP-Ayala Land TechnoHub ===
The centennial ₱6 billion, 20 hectares (49 acres) UP-Ayala Land TechnoHub, a complex of low-rise buildings along Commonwealth Avenue, within the 37.5 hectares (93 acres) of the UP North Science and Technology Park, was constructed on February 16, 2006, and inaugurated on November 22, 2008. It was developed by Ayala Land into an information technology and IT-enabled services community to host business process outsourcing (BPO) and technology firms.

=== Enhanced motto ===
On May 14, 2024, Angelo Jimenez proclaimed UP's new logo and "Honor, Excellence, Service" motto.

== Autonomous units ==
At present, the University of the Philippines is composed of nine constituent universities (CU) located in 15 campuses around the country. UP Diliman houses the system-wide administrative headquarters. Each constituent university of UP is headed by a chancellor, who is elected on a three-year term by the Board of Regents. Unlike the president, who is elected on a single six-year term without re-election, the chancellor may be re-elected for another three-year term but it is upon the discretion of the members of the Board of Regents.

University	Chancellor	Campus land area (Hectares)	Founded	Focus Areas (Non-exhaustive)	CHED Centers of Excellence and Development	Description and remarks
University of the Philippines Baguio	Prof. Joel M. Addawe	6	1961	Social Sciences (Anthropology, Culture Studies, etc.); Arts and Communication; Business and Management; Biology; Mathematics	Biology, Mathematics, Physics	UP's regional hub in the Cordillera, advancing science and cultural studies
University of the Philippines Cebu	Atty. Leo B. Malagar	12+	1918 (Junior College of Liberal Arts); 1930 (Cebu Junior College, UP)	Information Technology; Arts; Various Sciences including Mathematics and Statistics; Social Sciences (e.g., Political Science)	Environmental Science, Information Technology	UP's creative and innovation hub in Central Philippines; Elevated from UP Visayas to an autonomous unit, and later to a constituent university.
University of the Philippines Diliman	Atty. Edgardo Carlo Vistan II	493 (Quezon City campus only)	1909 (founding colleges); 1949 (Diliman campus)	Arts and Humanities (e.g., Fine Arts, Music, Film, Media, etc.); Social Sciences (e.g., Law, Governance, Sports Science, Economics, etc.); Natural and Physical Sciences (e.g., Geology, Physics, Chemistry, Biology, and related fields); Engineering; Business and Management	Anthropology, Biology, Broadcasting, Cell and Molecular Biology, Chemical Engineering, Chemistry, Communication, Electrical Engineering, English, Environmental Science, Foreign Language, Geodetic Engineering, Geology, History, Journalism, Library and Information Science, Literature, Marine Science, Mathematics, Metallurgical Engineering, Music, Physics, Political Science, Psychology, Sociology, Social Work, Statistics, Teacher Education	UP's leading institution for liberal arts, scientific research, and nation-building; Houses the central administration of the UP system; represents UP in the University Athletics Association of the Philippines
University of the Philippines Los Baños	Dr. Jose V. Camacho, Jr.	15,205 (total); 5,445 (main campus); 9,760 (land grants)	1909	Agricultural and Food Sciences (including Biotechnology); Life and Natural Sciences (e.g., Forestry, Biology, Chemistry, Nutrition, Physics, and related fields); Mathematics, Statistics, and Computer Science; Engineering; Veterinary Medicine; Communication; Economics	Agricultural Engineering, Agriculture, Biology, Chemical Engineering, Development Communication, Environmental Science, Forestry, Information Technology, Statistics, Veterinary Medicine	UP's center of excellence for agricultural, natural, and applied sciences; Houses the International Rice Research Institute; designated as caretaker of Mount Makiling
University of the Philippines Manila	Dr. Michael L. Tee	14	1905 (College of Medicine); 1908 (UP)	Health Sciences and Allied Medical Professions; Biomedical Sciences (Biochemistry, Biology)	Medicine, Nursing	The Philippines' national center for health sciences and medical education; Operates the Philippine General Hospital and houses the National Institutes of Health
University of the Philippines Mindanao	Prof. Lyre Anni Murao	204	1995	Humanities and Social Sciences (e.g., Architecture, Sports Science, etc.); Agribusiness; Various Sciences including Data Science	Biology	UP's flagbearer in Mindanao, advancing the sciences, culture, and innovation; houses the CHED Zonal Research Center, DOST-SEI Regional Biotechnology Laboratory, and the Philippine Genome Center Mindanao
University of the Philippines Visayas	Dr. Clement Camposano	1,500; Main Campus	1947	Fisheries and Ocean Sciences; Basic and Applied Sciences; Business and Management, Social Sciences, Humanities, and the Arts	Fisheries	UP's regional hub in the Visayas, pioneering in fisheries and regional development
University of the Philippines Open University	Dr. Joane V. Serrano	23 (Headquartered in Los Baños, Laguna)	1995	Education, Information & Communication Studies, Management & Development Studies (offered in the distance education mode)		UP's leader in open and distance e-learning
University of the Philippines Tacloban	Dr. John Paul T. Yusiong		1973	Humanities, Management, Social Sciences, Natural Sciences & Mathematics		

=== Satellite campuses ===
The satellite campuses do not have autonomous status. They are considered extension colleges of their parent unit. Some campuses host different programs from various colleges within the parent unit.

==== UP Diliman ====
- UPD Bonifacio Global City Professional Schools (Taguig City)
- UPD Extension Program in Olongapo (Olongapo City)
- UPD Extension Program in Pampanga (Clark Freeport Zone, Mabalacat, Pampanga)
- UP Dasmarinas Technology Innovation Campus (Dasmariñas, Cavite), groundbreaking.

==== UP Los Baños ====
- UPLB Professional School for Agriculture and the Environment (Panabo City, Davao del Norte)

==== UP Manila ====
- UPM School of Health Sciences in Baler (Baler, Aurora)
- UPM School of Health Sciences in Koronadal (Koronadal City, South Cotabato)
- UPM School of Health Sciences in Palo (Palo, Leyte)
- UPM School of Health Sciences in Tarlac (Tarlac City, Tarlac)

==== UP Cebu ====
- UPC Professional Schools (Cebu City)

==== UP Visayas ====
- UPV Iloilo City Campus (Iloilo City)
- UPV Antique Extension (Pandan, Antique)

==== UP Open University ====
- Seven (7) learning centers across the country

=== Basic education ===
- University of the Philippines High School Cebu in UP Cebu
- University of the Philippines High School Iloilo in UP Visayas
- University of the Philippines Integrated School in UP Diliman
- University of the Philippines Rural High School in UP Los Baños

== Organization ==
Presidents of the
University of the Philippines
Murray S. Bartlett, 1911-1915
Ignacio B. Villamor, 1915-1921
Guy Potter Wharton Benton, 1921-1925
Rafael V. Palma, 1925-1933
Jorge Bocobo, 1934-1939
Bienvenido Ma. González, 1939–1943, 1945-1951
Antonio Sison, 1943-1945
Vidal A. Tan, 1951-1956
Enrique Virata, 1956-1958
Vicente G. Sinco, 1958-1962
Carlos P. Romulo, 1962-1968
Salvador P. Lopez, 1969-1975
Onofre D. Corpuz, 1975-1979
Emanuel V. Soriano, 1979-1981
Edgardo J. Angara, 1981-1987
José Abueva, 1987-1993
Emil Q. Javier, 1993-1999
Francisco Nemenzo, Jr., 1999-2005
Emerlinda R. Roman, 2005–2011
Alfredo E. Pascual, 2011–2017
Danilo Concepcion, 2017–2023
Angelo Jimenez, 2023–present

=== Presidents of the University of the Philippines ===
The President of the University of the Philippines is elected for a single six-year term by the university's eleven-member Board of Regents. As of 2023, two Americans and 20 Filipinos served as Presidents of the University of the Philippines.

The current president of UP is lawyer and former regent Angelo Jimenez. He assumed office on February 10, 2023.

=== Board of Regents ===
The governance of the university is vested in the Board of Regents of the University of the Philippines System (or Lupon ng mga Rehente in Filipino) and is commonly abbreviated as BoR. The board, with its 11 members, is the highest decision-making body in the UP system.

The Chairperson of the Commission on Higher Education (CHED) serves as the Board's Chairperson while the President of the University of the Philippines is the co-chairperson. The Chairpersons of the Committee on Higher, Technical and Vocational Education of the Senate and the Committee on Higher and Technical Education House of Representatives are members of the Board of Regents which are concurrent with their functions as committee chairpersons.

UP students, represented by the General Assembly of Student Councils, nominate a Student Regent. While the Faculty Regent is likewise nominated by the faculty members of the whole University. Alumni are represented by the President of the UP Alumni Association. A Staff Regent, representing professional and administrative personnel, was included with the passage of the new UP Charter in 2008. The remaining members of the Board of Regents are nominated into the position by the President of the Philippines.

As of 2025, the members of the Board of Regents of the University of the Philippines System are:

	Board member	
Chairperson	Hon. Shirley C. Agrupis	Chairperson of the Commission on Higher Education
Co-chairperson	Hon. Angelo A. Jimenez	President of the University of the Philippines
Member	Hon. Loren B. Legarda	Chairperson, Senate Higher, Technical and Vocational Education Committee
Member	Hon. Jude A. Acidre	Chairperson, House Committee on Higher and Technical Education
Member	Hon. Robert Lester F. Aranton	Alumni Regent & President, UP Alumni Association
Member	Hon. Early Sol A. Gadong	Faculty Regent
Member	Hon. Marie Theresa S. Alambra	Staff Regent
Member	Hon. Ron Dexter L. Clemente	Student Regent
Member	Hon. Alfredo E. Pascual	Appointed Regent by President Bongbong Marcos
Member	Hon. Gregorio B. Pastorfide	Appointed Regent by President Rodrigo Duterte
Member	Hon. Raul C. Pagdanganan	Appointed Regent by President Rodrigo Duterte

The secretary of the university and of the Board of Regents is Atty. Roberto M.J. Lara.

== Academics ==
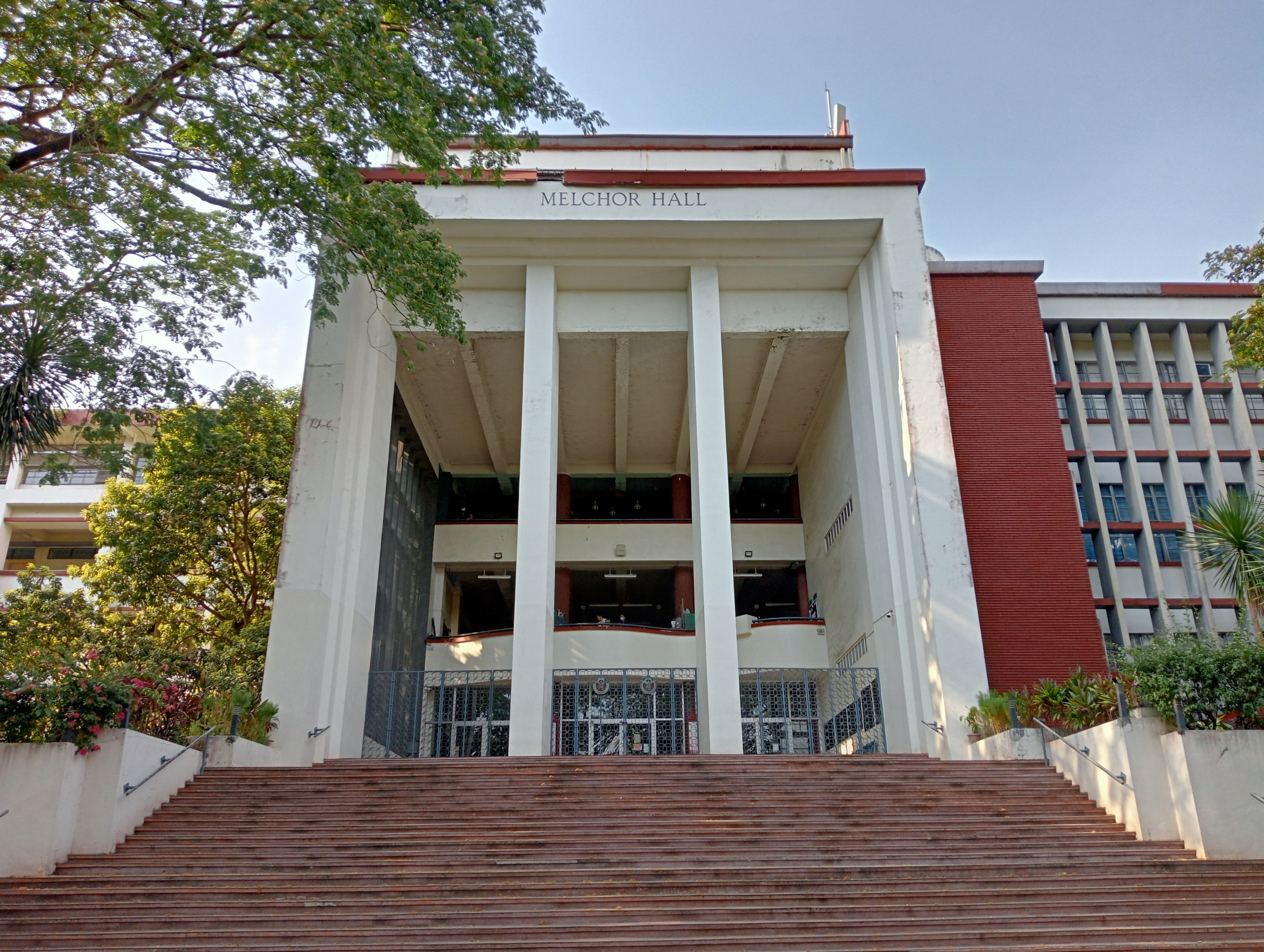
Melchor Hall in UP Diliman

The University of the Philippines System offers 246 undergraduate degree programs and 362 graduate degree programs, more than any other university in the country. The campus in Diliman offers the largest number of degree programs, and other campuses are known to lead and specialize in specific programs. The university has 57 degree-granting units throughout the system, which may be a college, school or institute that offers an undergraduate or a graduate program. In the Los Baños campus, a separate Graduate School administers the graduate programs in agriculture, forestry, the basic sciences, mathematics and statistics, development economics and management, agrarian studies and human ecology. The College of Public Health at the Manila campus has a collaboration with Boston University School of Public Health. This program allows students from Boston University to do a semester of coursework at UP Manila as well as an international field practicum in the Philippines. The university has 4,571 faculty, trained locally and abroad with 36% having graduate degrees. The university is one of the three universities in the Philippines affiliated with the ASEAN University Network, and the only Philippine university to be affiliated with the ASEAN-European University Network and the Association of Pacific Rim Universities.

=== Budget ===
The university has the highest financial endowment of all educational institutions in the Philippines. In 2008, the entire UP System received a financial subsidy from the national government of ₱ 5.7 billion. The total expenditure for the same year, however, is ₱ 7.2 billion, or approximately ₱ 135,000 per student. State universities and colleges have continually experienced budget cuts over the years. In 2019, the university requested a ₱44.9 billion budget but only received ₱15.5 billion for its budget, with an additional ₱1.5 billion for operational and equipment expenses. The Philippine General Hospital, the most affected unit of the UP System, received an insufficient budget of P2.92 billion, with only P155 million out of the requested P1.6 billion allocated for infrastructure and capital outlays.

The UP System will receive the largest proposed allocation among state universities under the 2026 National Expenditure Program, with ₱25.82 billion dedicated mainly to personnel and operational expenses and infrastructure upgrades. Other state universities such as PUP, CLSU, Benguet State University, and Central Mindanao University also get significant funding.

=== Rankings and reputation ===
University rankings

Global – Overall
- QS World: 362 (2026)
- THE World: 801–1000 (2023)

Regional – Overall
- QS Asia: 77 (2023)
- THE Asia: 129 (2023)

National – Overall
- QS National: 1 (2023)
- THE National: 2 (2023)

In 2020, UP was ranked 65th in the Times Higher Education (THE) Asia University Rankings and 69th in the QS Asia University Rankings for 2021, the highest ranked Philippine university. In the THE Asia rankings, UP is the fifth best university in Southeast Asia, after National University of Singapore (3rd), Nanyang Technological University (6th), University of Malaya (43rd) and Universiti Brunei Darussalam (60th). On the other hand, the QS rankings put it as the 13th best university in Southeast Asia after two Singapore, five Malaysian, three Indonesian, and two Thai universities.

Moreover, UP ranks in numerous world subject rankings, most notably 51-100th place in Library and Information Management, 51-100th place in Development Studies, 101-150th place in English Language and Literature, Geography, and Politics and International Studies, 151-200th place in Archaeology, Agriculture and Forestry, and Sociology in the QS World University Rankings by Subject Area. UP programs also place in Times Higher Education World University Rankings: 126-150th in Clinical, Pre-Clinical and Health subjects; 501-600 bracket for both Life Sciences and Social Sciences; in the 601+ bracket for Engineering and Technology, and Computer Science; and in the 801+ bracket in Physical Sciences.

The 2024 Quacquarelli Symonds world university rankings published on April, 10 by subject included the University of the Philippines, De La Salle University and Ateneo de Manila University (of 1,559 institutions which featured 55 individual subjects). "Three Philippine universities placed in one out of four subject disciplines of the QS, while only UP ranked in 2 other subjects" QS stated.

=== General education program ===
The General Education Program was introduced in 1959 and formed core courses prescribed for all students at the undergraduate level. The General Education Program is the Revitalized General Education Program (abbreviated as RGEP), which was approved by the Board of Regents in 2001. The RGEP offers courses in three domains (Arts and Humanities; Mathematics, Science, and Technology; and Social Sciences and Philosophy) and gives students the freedom to choose the general education courses in these domains that they would like to take. It has led to the development of courses unique to campuses. Examples of these courses include NASC 10 (Forests as Source of Life) in Los Baños, Geography 1 (Places and Landscapes in a Changing World) in Diliman, Aqua Sci 1 (People and the Aquatic World) in Visayas, and History 3 (History of Philippine Ethnic Minorities) in Baguio.

=== Library system ===
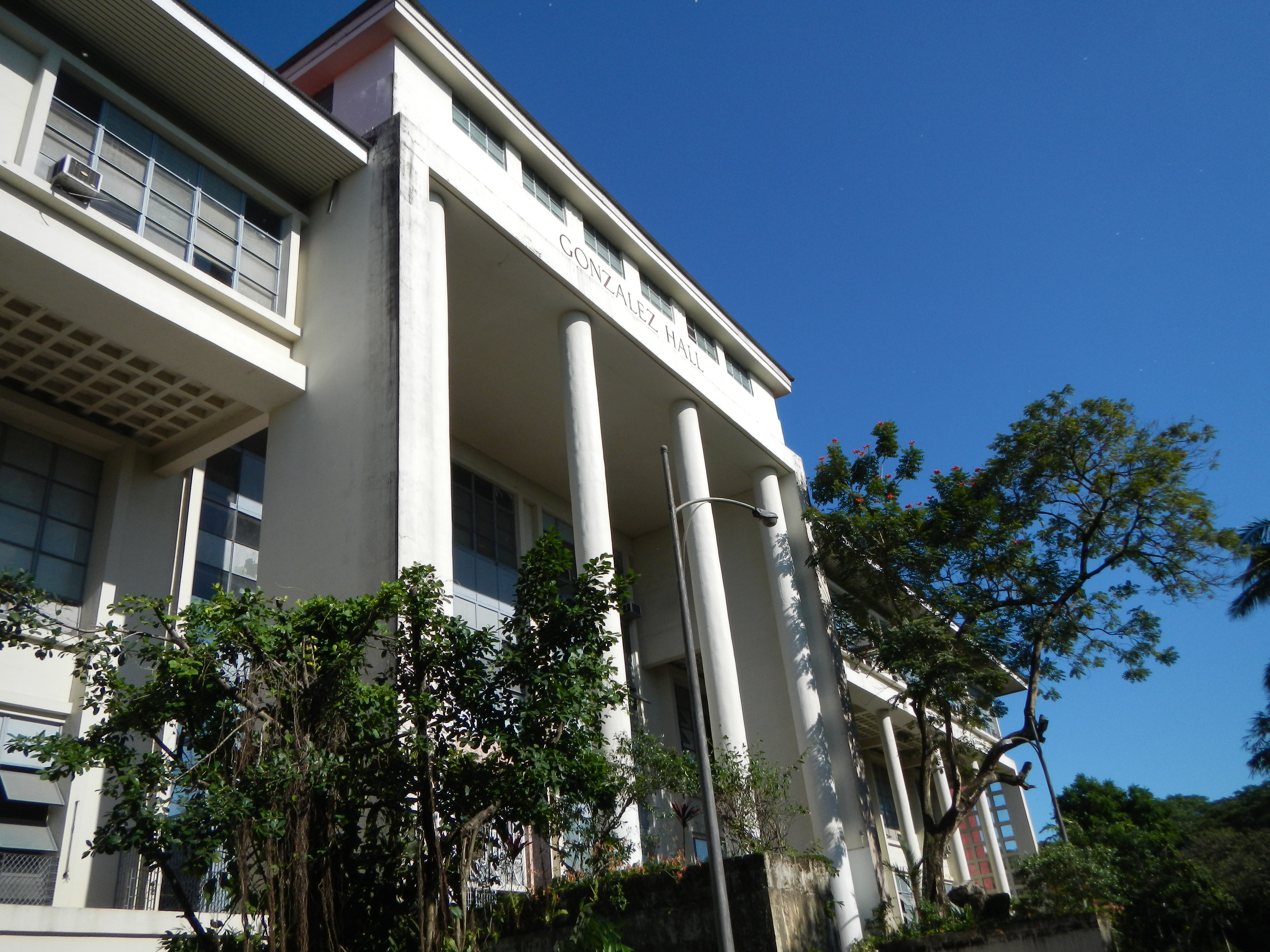
The main library (Gonzalez Hall) in UP Diliman

The university library system contains the largest collections of agricultural, medical, veterinary and animal science materials in the Philippines. The library system has a collection of Filipiniana material, serials and journals in both electronic and physical forms and UPIANA materials in its archives. It also has a collection of documents of student, political, and religious organizations advocating political, economic, and social changes during the Marcos administration in the Diliman library.

The university is one of the five governmental agencies involved with the Philippine eLib, a nationwide information resource-sharing consortium, to which it provides access to 758,649 of its bibliographic records.

The library was established in 1922 on the Manila campus and was considered one of the best in Asia prior to the Second World War. The collection, containing almost 150,000 volumes, was destroyed when Japanese troops stormed the library during the war, leaving only a handful of books intact. Gabriel Bernardo, the Librarian of the university who built the collection, described the loss as "intellectual famine." Bernardo would later rebuild the library in the Diliman campus. The university has likewise been one of the pioneers in library science education in the country. Library courses were first offered under the College of Liberal Arts under James Alexander Robertson in 1914. In 1961, the Institute of Library Science was established in Diliman and a year later, the institute established the country's first graduate program in Library Science.

== Admissions and financial aid ==
=== Undergraduate admissions ===
As a public state university, "selection is based on intellectual and personal preparedness of the applicant irrespective of sex, religious belief and political affiliation." Admission into the university's undergraduate programs is the most competitive admissions in the country; as of 2026, 147,437 students took the exam in August 2025, with about 18,350 being accepted—an admission rate of about 12.45%. Admission to a program is usually based on the result of the University of the Philippines College Admissions Test (UPCAT), University Predicted Grade (UPG)—60% from the UPCAT and 40% from High School grades (weighted in accordance to school's rigor) to an average of grades obtained and sometimes, a quota set by the unit offering the program. The university also maintains a Policy of Democratization which aims to "make the UP studentry more representative of the nation's population."

The UPCAT also allows students to enter INTegrated Liberal Arts and MEDicine (INTARMED), the university's accelerated 7-year medicine curriculum, one of the two entry points into the program. Transferring to the university from other constituent units or schools outside the system are determined by the degree-granting unit that offers the program or the course, not by the university's Office of Admissions.

The university's admissions test especially for undergraduate education is considered among, if not the most, competitive admission test in the Philippines. It attracts students from local, regional, and national public, private, and science high schools of the Philippines.

=== Former Socialized Tuition System and Current Free Tuition Law ===
The Socialized Tuition System (also referred to as the "Iskolar ng Bayan" Program) (STS) was implemented in response to the increase in tuition in 2014. The program, proposed in 1988 by UP President Jose Abueva and mandated by the President and Congress of the Philippines, called for a radical departure from the old fee and scholarship structure of UP, resulting in tremendous benefits for low-income and disadvantaged Filipino students. The Socialized Tuition and Financial Assistance Program (STFAP) is divided into four basic components: Subsidized Education, Socialized Tuition, Scholarships, and Student Assistantships. In the 1989 STFAP, income groups are divided into nine brackets, with one having the full benefits. In December 2006, the Board of Regents approved a restructured STFAP, along with the increase in tuition and other fees that will apply for incoming freshmen.

The Revised STFAP reduces the brackets from nine to five, and will supposedly increase the number of students receiving tuition subsidy and increase stipend rates and coverage. However, critics of the restructured STFAP argue that the data used in the formulation of the revised program is not an acceptable prediction of a student's family income, that some of the bracket assignments are flawed and that the program fails to address or revise student assistantship programs.

After the enactment of the Free Tuition Law, the UP System became free for all undergraduate students with cost-effective options for graduate education. Few degree programs and certain personal cases do have matriculation which are subject to the university's policies.

=== University symbols ===
UP Maroon and UP Forest Green are the official university colors of UP

The university's colors are maroon and forest green. Maroon was chosen to represent the fight for freedom, as Maroon is also a name of a Jamaican tribe who were successful in defending their freedom from slavery and their independence from English conquerors for more than 100 years. The colors are also immortalized in the University's hymn;

Luntian at pula, Sagisag magpakailanman....

In 2004, the university's seal and the Oblation were registered in the Philippine Intellectual Property Office to prevent unauthorized use and multiplication of the symbols for the centennial of the university in 2008. The centennial logo was used in visual materials and presentations of the centennial activities and events of the university. The logo, which was designed by Ringer Manalang, is composed of the Oblation, the sablay and a highlighted Philippine map.

=== Official seal ===
Coat of Arms of the University of the Philippines
- The official seal as depicted at the entrance to the UP Diliman Main Library
- Armiger: University of the Philippines
- Adopted: 1913
- Shield: Party per chevron vert and sanguine, in the dexter lamp Or; in the sinister a cogwheel Or; at the base volcano and coconut tree both Or
- Supporters: a bald eagle displayed Or
- Use: Official documents, publications and markers.

The Seal of the University of the Philippines is the official device used by the university as its official symbol and mark for its legal and public documents and publications. The current seal in use was approved by the Board of Regents on February 25, 1913, during its 77th Meeting. It has two versions: a one-color and a full-color version, using the prescribed tones of Maroon and Forest Green, the official colors of the university as set by the University Brand Book released in 2007. The seal was registered in the Philippine Intellectual Property Office and was approved in the year 2006 to prevent unauthorized use in time for UP's Centennial Celebration in 2008.

The bald eagle in the official seal holds a shield that carries a lamp, a cogwheel and; a volcano and tree (sometimes rendered erroneously as a star and the planet Saturn). These symbols represent science and medicine, engineering, and agriculture respectively. Until today, the university takes pride in these three areas of knowledge as these degree programs in UP are acknowledged as Centers of Excellence in the Philippines by the Commission on Higher Education. A myth persists that the bird in the seal is in fact, a parrot, as stated in some Freshmen orientation materials. The university's varsity team was also once called the Parrots, adding to the confusion about the species of the bird in question. An explanation for the use of the eagle in the seal is that it was derived from the coat of arms of the City of Manila and the Great Seal of the United States.

Starting with the reorganization of the UP System in 1972, in order to signify their newly gained autonomy and specialization, most constituent universities of the System have adopted their own seals. These logos are either variations of the official seal, by changing the colors and adding elements, or are entirely new designs. These are sometimes used in place of the official University seal in official documents, such as transcripts and markers. Distinct seals or logos are sometimes produced, such as those for the UP System and UPLB Centennial Celebrations. A notable use of the System seal can be seen in the official seal of the UP Alumni Association, which features the Oblation, the Diliman Carillon, the Bahay ng Alumni facade and the university seal in its entirety.

Flag of the University of the Philippines
- Design: A horizontal bicolor flag with the University Seal in the center.
- Designed by: Unknown

=== University Flag ===
The flag of the University of the Philippines is a horizontal bicolor with equal bands of UP Maroon and UP Forest and the university's seal at the center.

=== "UP Naming Mahal" ===
"UP Naming Mahal" is the university's hymn. The melody for the song was written by Nicanor Abelardo, an alumnus and former faculty member of the UP College of Music. Abelardo is considered to be one of the Philippines' greatest musicians. Because of the original scale of the hymn in B flat major, which is too high for the usual voice, UP Conservatory of Music (now UP College of Music) professors Hilarion Rubio and Tomas Aguirre reset the music in G major. The choral version arranged by Nhick Pacis was performed by the UP Concert Chorus.

The English lyrics (entitled as "UP Beloved") were taken from a poem by Teogenes Velez, a Liberal Arts student. The translation to Filipino was a composite from seven entries in a contest held by the university. The judges did not find any of the seven translations as fully satisfactory.

==== Lyrics ====
Filipino Lyrics (U.P. Naming Mahal)	Original Lyrics in English (U.P. Beloved)
I. U.P. naming mahal, pamantasang hirang Ang tinig namin, sana'y inyong dinggin Malayong lupain, amin mang marating Di rin magbabago ang damdamin Di rin magbabago ang damdamin. II. Luntian at pula, Sagisag magpakailanman Ating pagdiwang, bulwagan ng dangal Humayo't itanghal, giting at tapang Mabuhay ang pag-asa ng bayan Mabuhay ang pag-asa ng bayan.	I. U.P. beloved, thou Alma Mater dear For thee united, our joyful voices hear Far tho we wander, o'er island yonder Loyal thy sons we'll ever be Loyal thy sons we'll ever be. II. Echo the watchword, the Red and Green forever. Give out the password, to the Hall of Brave sons rare. Sing forth the message, ring out with courage All hail, thou hope of our dear land, All hail, thou hope of our dear land.

=== Sablay ===
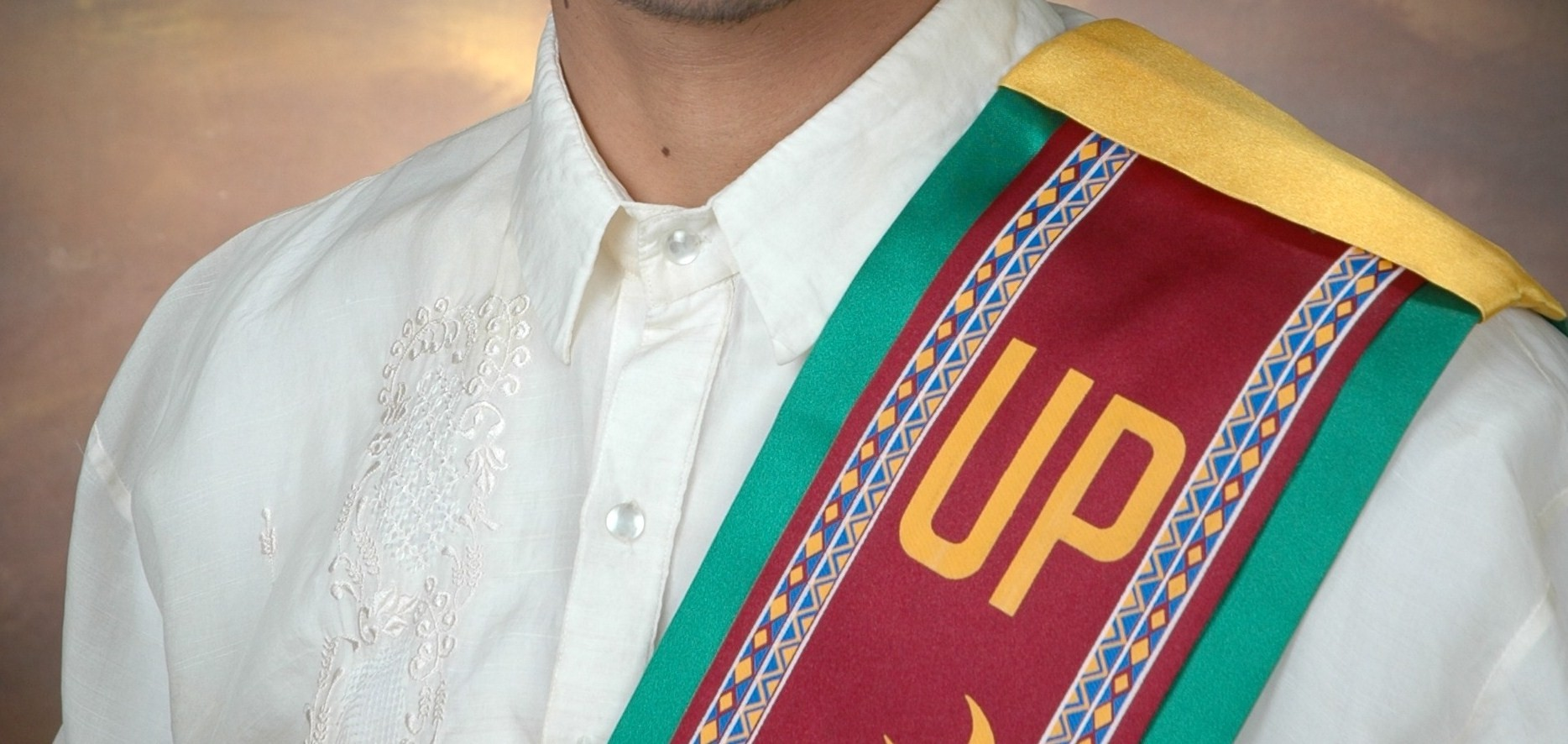
Sablay, a ceremonial sash worn by graduates in the Philippines

The university uses unique academic regalia, called the "Sablay," which is a sash patterned after the centuries-old sash academic regalia of Scandinavian universities. The "Sablay" is a sash joined in front by an ornament and embroidered or printed with the university's initials in Baybayin script and running geometric motifs of indigenous Filipino ethnic groups. It is traditionally worn over a white or ecru dress for females or an ecru barong Tagalog and black pants for males, although there has been instances wherein the Sablay is worn over other indigenous clothing. Candidates for graduation wear the sablay at the right shoulder, and is then moved to the left shoulder after the President of the university confers their degree, similar to the moving of the tassel of the academic cap.

== In popular culture ==
The University of the Philippines is famed for campus activism, serving as the critical thinking and democratic voice of the country. During the Marcos dictatorship, the university became the hotspot for protest against the encroaching consolidation of presidential powers as seen in the Diliman Commune. While in Rodrigo Duterte's War on Drugs and subsequent disregard for human rights pushed the university to be a leading voice in proper action. In the modern era, certain albeit incredibly infrequent cases of UP student deaths are related to indirect or direct involvement with the New People's Army and its recruitment.

In terms of admissions, by far the most popular and competitive admission test in the country is the UPCAT having upwards of 120,000 takers a year. Beforehand, thousand upon thousands of students prepare through various review centers in the country for the admissions test.

Students dominate Professional Regulation Commission licensure examinations for medicine, engineering, agriculture, and the rest of the sciences. In addition, association with public service and executive positions in government are frequent for UP alums in accordance to the mandate of the institution. UP is the country's leading university in the world university rankings.

== Notable alumni ==
The University of the Philippines has numerous notable alumni and faculty. UP graduated many leading figures in the country.

In the country's political history, UP has produced former Philippine presidents such as José P. Laurel, Diosdado Macapagal, Ferdinand Marcos, and Gloria Macapagal Arroyo; former senators Lorenzo Tañada, Jovito Salonga, Ninoy Aquino, Francis Pangilinan, and Richard J. Gordon; the 14th Vice President Leni Robredo; statesmen Arturo Tolentino, Gerardo Roxas, and Doy Laurel; prominent jurists such as former chief justices Hilario Davide and Maria Lourdes Sereno; and incumbent Congressman Roman Romulo.

In business, UP graduated billionaire and Araneta patriarch Jorge L. Araneta. Antonio Quirino, the founder of the first television station in the Philippines: Alto Broadcasting System (now known as ABS-CBN Corporation), is also a graduate, as is Marla Rausch, the founder and CEO of Animation Vertigo, a motion-capture animation company. UP also produced the first Filipina Nobel Peace Prize laureate with Maria Ressa winning the award in 2021.

In media, UP graduated The Simpsons layout artist Jess Española, who won the first Primetime Emmy Award for his contribution as an assistant director of "Eternal Moonshine of the Simpson Mind" from the 19th season of The Simpsons.

In New Zealand, Louie Bretaña was awarded Artist of the Year, Filipino-Kiwi Hero Awards 2024 for his contribution to the New Zealand's visual arts.

== See also ==
- DZUP 1602
- Higher Education In The Philippines
