= University of the Philippines Los Baños =

Constituent University of the National University System in Laguna, Philippines

- "Unibersidad ng Pilipinas Los Baños"
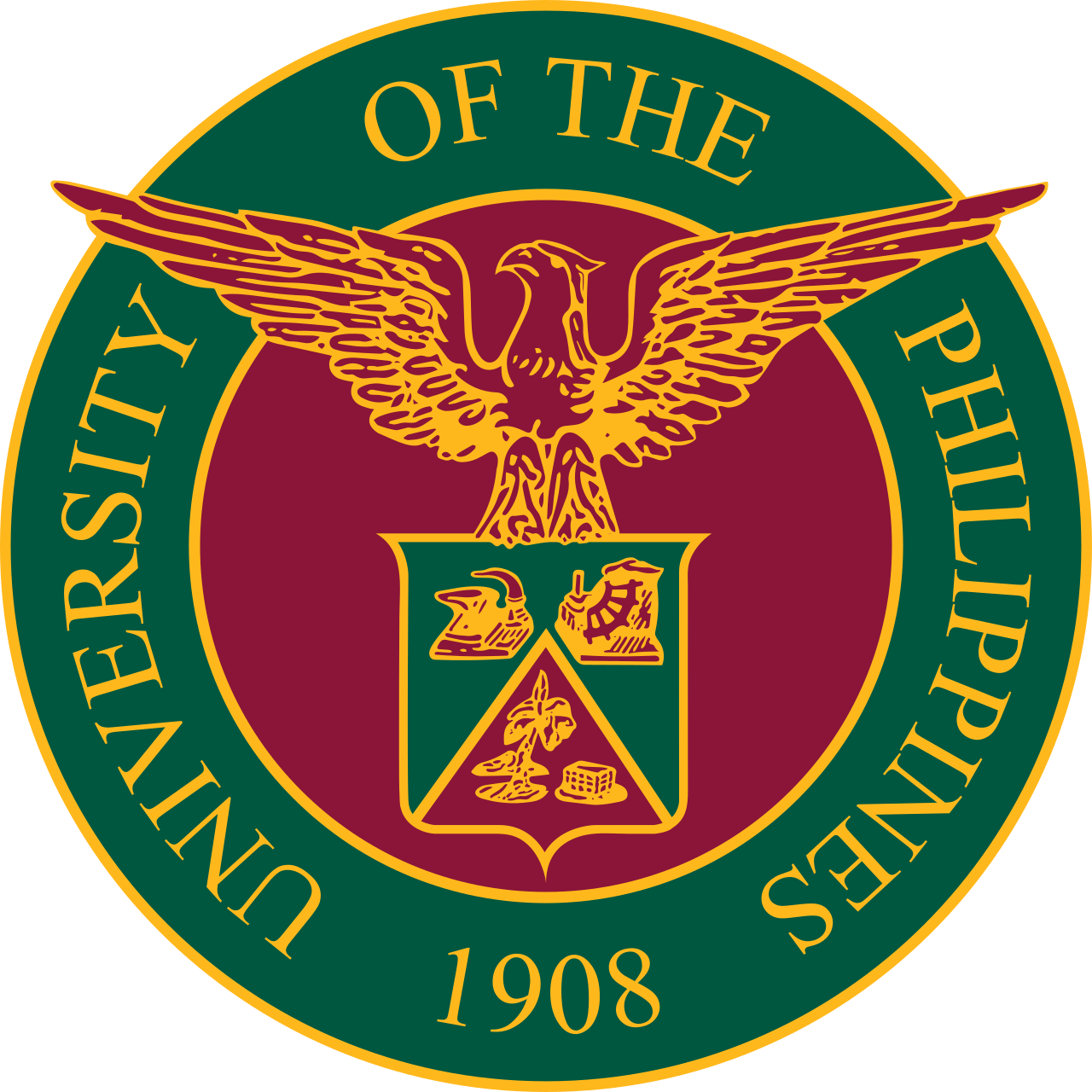
- Latin: Universitas Philippinensis Los Baños
- Other names: Elbi, UPLB
- Motto: Honor, Excellence, Service
- Type: National research university
- Established: March 6, 1909 (as College of Agriculture) (117 years and 245 days) November 20, 1972 (as autonomous university) (53 years and 351 days)
- Parent institution: University of the Philippines
- Affiliations: Association of Pacific Rim Universities; Association of Southeast Asian Institutions of Higher Learning; ASEAN University Network; ASEAN-European University Network
- Chancellor: Jose V. Camacho Jr.
- President: Angelo Jimenez
- Faculty: 1,143 (2025)
- Students: 15,340 (2025)
- Undergraduates: 13,306 (2025)
- Postgraduates: 2,034 (2025)
- Other students: 737 basic education (2019)
- Location: Los Baños, Laguna, Philippines; 14°9′54.18″N 121°14′29.55″E
- Campus: Peri-urban, 15,205 ha (37,570 acres)
- Language: English
- Hymn: "U.P. Naming Mahal" ("Our Beloved U.P.")
- Newspaper: UPLB Perspective
- Colors: UP Maroon and UP Forest Green
- Nickname: UPLB Fighting Maroons
- Mascot: Oble
- Student Moniker: Isko (Male), Iska (Female), Iskolar ng Bayan or Scholar of the Nation (Gender Neutral)
- Website: uplb.edu.ph
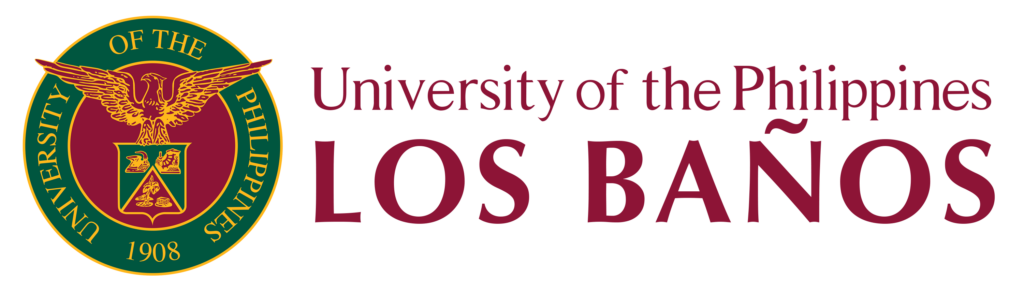

- Location in Laguna Location in Luzon Location in the Philippines

The University of the Philippines Los Baños (UP Los Baños or UPLB; Filipino: Unibersidad ng Pilipinas Los Baños) is a public university and a constituent university of the University of the Philippines System, primarily located in Los Baños, Laguna. Founded by law in 1908 and established as the UP College of Agriculture (UPCA) in 1909, it is one of the founding campuses of the UP System and has been an early center for agricultural education and research in Southeast Asia.

UPLB was reorganized in 1972 as the first autonomous constituent university of the UP System and has since developed into a multidisciplinary institution offering 171 degree programs across the life and physical sciences, engineering, social sciences, and the arts.

It is the largest campus in the UP System and in the country by land area, managing the Mount Makiling Forest Reserve, a designated ASEAN Heritage Park. It also operates units outside Los Baños, including the UP Rural High School in Bay, Laguna, and the UP Professional School for Agriculture and the Environment in Davao del Norte

The university comprises nine colleges and two schools, with nine of its academic programs recognized by the Commission on Higher Education as Centers of Excellence.

UPLB hosts several local and international research centers, including the International Rice Research Institute (IRRI), ASEAN Center for Biodiversity, and the Southeast Asian Regional Center for Graduate Study and Research in Agriculture (SEARCA).

== History ==
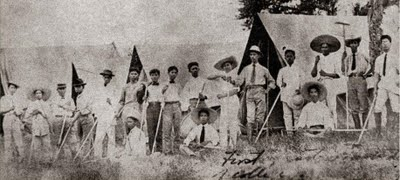
Classes were first held in tents.

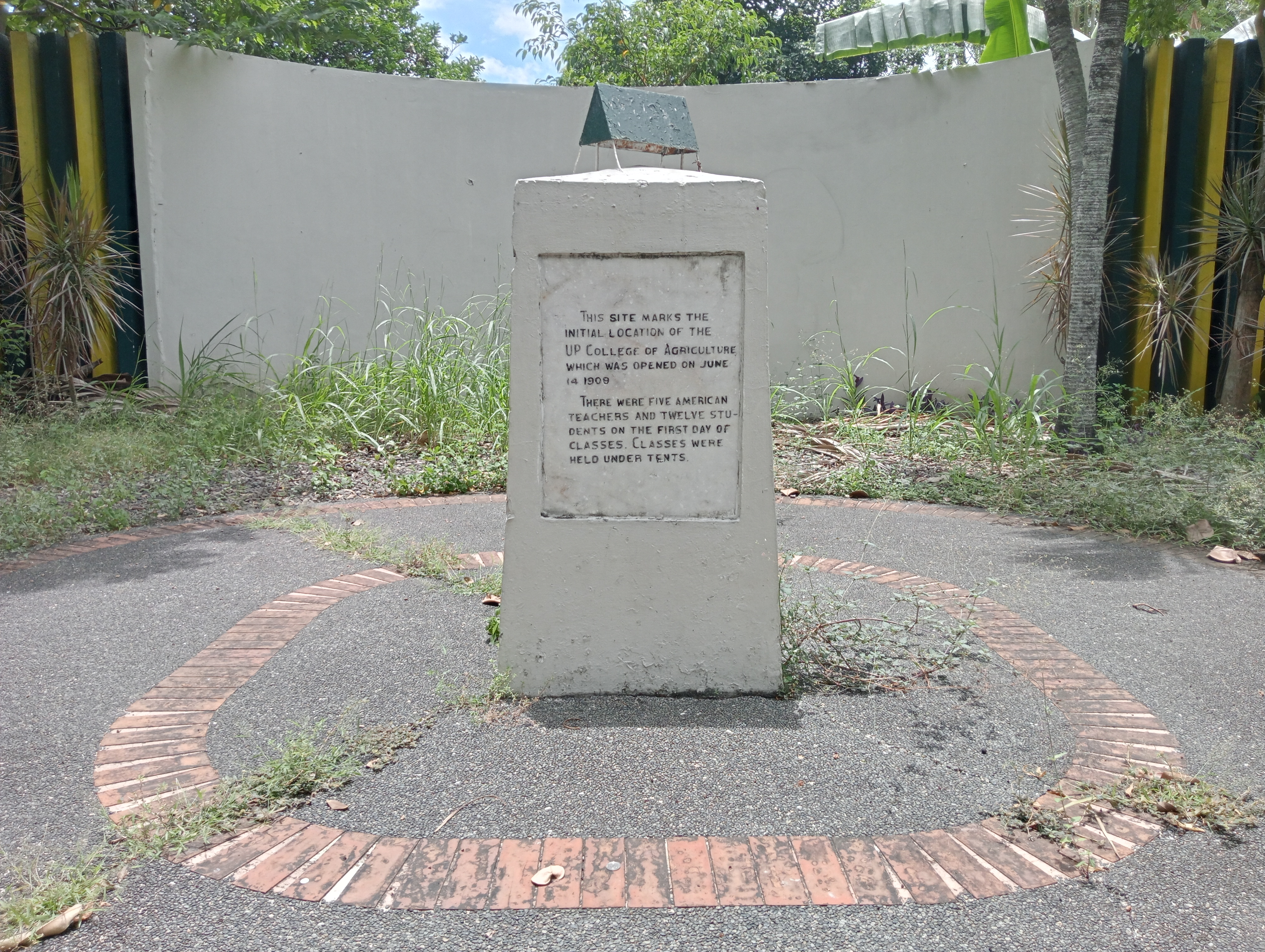
U.P. College of Agriculture Foundation Site

=== Early History (1908-1930s) ===
UPLB was originally established as the University of the Philippines College of Agriculture (UPCA) on March 6, 1909, by the UP Board of Regents to promote agricultural education and research in the Philippines. Edwin Copeland, an American botanist and Thomasite from the Philippine Normal College in Manila, was its first dean. Classes began in June 1909 with five professors while 12 students initially enrolled in the program. UPCA was the first college to be organized in UP following the enactment of the University Act of 1908.

In 1910, the Forest School was established as a branch of the College of Agriculture. Staffed initially by American instructors from the Bureau of Forestry, the school represented the earliest formal efforts to institutionalize forestry education in the Philippines.

In 1912, Dr. Charles Fuller Baker, an accomplished agriculturist and scientist, joined the College as professor and head of the Department of Agronomy. Baker played a pivotal role in strengthening the academic and research foundations of the college. In 1918, the College of Veterinary Science was transferred from Pandacan, Manila to Los Baños. By the early 1920s, enrollment had increased to 621 students, representing most provinces of the Philippines as well as several foreign countries, including China, Siam, Guam, Java, India, and Japan. This growth placed the UPCA among the larger units of the University of the Philippines during that period.

=== World War II and Its Postwar Reconstruction (1940s) ===
During the Japanese occupation of the Philippines, UPCA was closed and the campus converted into an internment camp for allied nationals and a headquarters of the Japanese army. For three years, the college was home to more than 2,000 civilians, mostly Americans, that were captured by the Japanese. In 1945, as part of the liberation of the Philippines, the US Army sent 130 11th Airborne Division paratroopers to Los Baños to rescue the internees. Only four paratroopers and two Filipino guerrillas were killed in the raid. However, Japanese reinforcements arrived two days later, destroying UPCA facilities and killing some 1,500 Filipino civilians in Los Baños soon afterwards.

UPCA became the first unit of the University of the Philippines to open after the war, with Leopoldo Uichanco as dean. However, only 125 (16 percent) of the original students enrolled. It was even worse for the School of Forestry, which only had nine students. Likewise, only 38 professors returned to teach. UPCA used its ₱470,546 (US$10,800) share in the Philippine-US War Damage Funds (released in 1947) for reconstruction.

Further financial endowments from the United States Agency for International Development (USAID) and the Mutual Security Agency (MSA) allowed the construction of new facilities, while scholarship grants, mainly from the Rockefeller Foundation and the International Cooperation Administration, helped fund the training of UPCA faculty. From 1947 to 1958, a total of 146 faculty members had been granted MS and PhD scholarships in US universities.

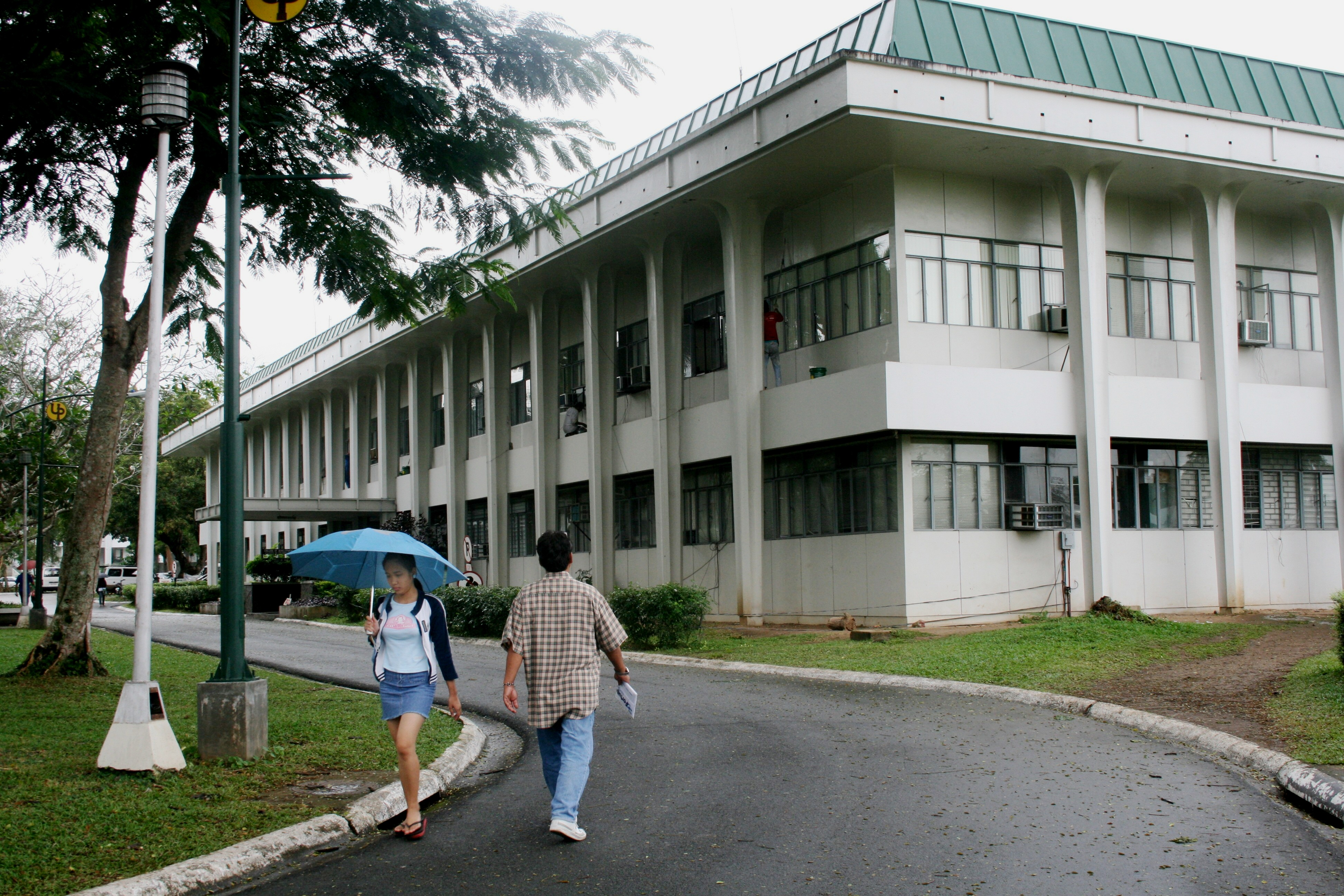
The Department of Agricultural Information and Communication building (now the Nora C. Quebral Hall of the College of Development Communication) was built under Umali's Five-Year Development Program.

=== Growth and International Collaboration (1950s-1960s) ===
Dioscoro Umali became UPCA dean in 1959. Umali's administration oversaw the creation of International Rice Research Institute (IRRI), Southeast Asian Regional Center for Graduate Study and Research in Agriculture (SEARCA); of which he was the first director), Dairy Training and Research Institute, and the Department of Food Science and Technology. New facilities were also constructed under his Five-Year Development Program.

Cornell University was instrumental in the post-war rebuilding of UP's Los Baños colleges. The Cornell-Los Baños project, implemented in 1952 to 1960, involved the rebuilding of UPCA's physical plant and Central Experiment Station, procurement of scientific equipment, and upgrading of teaching standards. A similar undertaking between Cornell, Syracuse University, the State University of New York, and the UP College of Forestry was implemented between 1957 and 1963. A "sister university relationship" was formally established in 1962 through the UP-Cornell Graduate Education program, which sought to develop and expand UP's agricultural education, research and extension programs, and to strengthen Cornell's own international agricultural development program. The program ended in 1972.

=== Birth of UPLB’s Autonomy (1970s-1990s) ===
==== Political and Institutional Challenges ====
The 1969 Philippine balance of payments crisis under the Ferdinand Marcos government marked the beginning of a prolonged period of social unrest across the country, including in UP Los Baños. This period of unrest, which included the First Quarter Storm, coincided with another issue, which was the call for the UP College of Agriculture to become independent from the University of the Philippines in Diliman.

Later in 1972, UPCA formally requested Ferdinand Marcos to allow the college to secede from the University of the Philippines due to the alleged withholding of its budget and the disapproval of curricular proposals. However, UP President Salvador P. Lopez strongly opposed the idea. A survey also found that there was very little support for complete independence at UPCA. As a compromise, Lopez proposed the transformation of UP into a system of autonomous constituent universities. Finally, on November 20, 1972, Presidential Decree No. 58 was signed, establishing UPLB as UP's first autonomous campus, with UPCA, College of Forestry, Agricultural Credit and Cooperatives Institute, Dairy Training and Research Institute, and the Diliman-based Agrarian Reform Institute as its first academic units. New colleges and research centers were created over the next few years, while the College of Veterinary Medicine was likewise transferred to UPLB from UP Diliman. Dr. Abelardo Samonte was appointed first chancellor of UPLB and led a comprehensive reorganization of the university.

==== Establishment of Research and Academic Centers ====
Following its grant of autonomy, UPLB also expanded its research, and extension functions with the establishment of specialized units such as the Institute of Plant Breeding (1975), National Crop Protection Center (1976), Post-Harvest Horticulture and Training Center (1977), and the National Institute of Molecular Biology and Biotechnology (BIOTECH; 1979). UPLB also strengthened its academic foundation with the creation of a new college and several academic institutes, such as the College of Science and Humanities (1973), Graduate School (1973), Institute of Human Ecology (1974), Institute of Agricultural Development and Administration (1975), and the Institute of Agricultural Engineering and Technology (1976).

Following the death of Chancellor Samonte in December 25, 1978, Dr. Emil Q. Javier succeeded him as the second chancellor (1979–1985), later serving as UP System President (1993–1999). Javier had been instrumental in building the university’s research infrastructure even prior to his chancellorship, notably as the founding director of the Institute of Plant Breeding. In 1983, through Javier’s initiative, Executive Order No. 889 was issued to establish the National Centers of Excellence in the Basic Sciences. The order designated several units within the UP System as national centers to bolster the country's scientific research capacity. At UP Los Baños, this included the Institute of Mathematical Sciences, the Institute of Chemistry, and the Institute of Biological Sciences.

Dr. Javier's leadership continued at the system level during his term as UP President (1993–1999). During this period, he led the establishment of UP Open University and UP Mindanao, and institutionalized the Ugnayan ng Pahinungod volunteer program. He also expanded the biotechnology program into a network known as the National Institutes of Molecular Biology and Biotechnology (NIMBB), with units across the UP System's major campuses.

==== Student Journalism ====
Meanwhile, the establishment of UPLB as an autonomous campus also saw the establishment of the UPLB Perspective as its student paper in 1973 – earning it the distinction of being one of the first student newspapers to be allowed to publish after the September 1972 martial law crackdown on newspapers and other media establishments.

=== Modernization and Growth in the 21st Century (2000s-2020s) ===
==== Academic Growth and Global Engagement ====
From the 2000s to the early 2020s, UPLB underwent a period of institutional modernization, digital transition, and increased focus on campus security and student welfare. These years were also marked by significant challenges, including destructive typhoons and the COVID-19 pandemic, which tested the university’s resilience and adaptability.

UPLB introduced new academic offerings to include undergraduate degrees in Agricultural Biotechnology (2010), Mechanical Engineering (2021), Materials Engineering (2022), Accountancy (2024), and Sports Science (2025), as well as associate programs in Entrepreneurship (2022), Development Communication (2023), and Sports Studies (2023).

UPLB’s graduate programs have also continued to expand across diverse disciplines, with the 2020s marking the introduction of notable programs in environmental management, resilience, and sustainability as well as new “PhD by Research” programs. In 2015, the Nagoya University Asian Satellite Campuses Institute was established at the Graduate School, offering transnational doctoral programs in various fields. UPLB has also launched Dual Doctor of Philosophy by Research programs with the University of Montpellier in France, the University of Reading and the University of Liverpool in the United Kingdom, and Curtin University in Australia (in collaboration with UP Mindanao), allowing students to earn doctorates from both institutions through joint supervision and study arrangements.

==== Academic Reforms and the Pandemic Years ====
Institutionally, the university responded to national reforms, notably navigating the academic adjustments and student intake gap caused by the implementation of the K-12 Basic Education Program in the mid-2010s. Simultaneously, UPLB adopted the Student Academic Information System (SAIS) for registration, a controversial digital transition that generated significant and sustained student protests due to technical difficulties.

During the pandemic years (2020-2021), the UP including UPLB shifted to remote learning and research, mobilized experts and resources to aid the national COVID-19 response. UPLB also established a subnational COVID-19 testing laboratory equipped with an RT-PCR machine, repurposing one of its existing research facilities for this effort.

==== Recent Campus Development ====
In recent years (2022-2025), the government launched new construction projects in UPLB. These include the construction of a new main library, the Food Processing Research and Development Center, the Agricultural and Economic Development Studies Center, and a microbial bank for the BIOTECH Philippine National Collection of Microorganisms. Construction of the Agricultural Genomics Research Center (AGRC), a collaboration among UPLB, KOICA, and IRRI, has begun and is set to be completed in early 2026 as a state-of-the-art hub for genome-based research advancing crop and livestock improvement, food security, and capacity building.

=== Other Notable Incidents Affecting the UPLB Community ===
When martial law was declared in September 1972, Marcos cracked down on any form of criticism or activism, leading to the arrest, torture and/or killing of Los Baños residents. Those killed included student activists Alexander Mecenas Gonzales, Modesto "Bong" Sison, and Manuel Bautista, campus journalists Antero Santos and Alfredo Malicay, and botany teaching fellow Cesar Hicaro. Meanwhile, Chemistry instructor Aloysius Baes was among those who were arrested and tortured. Those who went missing ("desaparecidos"), meanwhile, included Tish Ladlad, Cristina Catalla, Gerardo "Gerry" Faustino, Rizalina Ilagan, Ramon Jasul, and Jessica Sales.

Violent crime incidents in the UPLB community, with some resulting in the deaths of students (Eileen Sarmenta and Allan Gomez in 1993, Given Grace Cebanico in 2011, Ray Bernard Peñaranda and Maria Victoria Reyes in 2012) were widely covered by the national media. As a result, national government agencies, the local government of Los Baños, and the university administration have enacted more stringent security measures.

== Organization and Administration ==
=== Colleges and Schools ===
Schools and Colleges of UPLB
Unit	Foundation	Notes
College of Agriculture and Food Science	1909	
College of Arts and Sciences	1972	
College of Development Communication	1998	
College of Economics and Management	1975	
College of Engineering and Agro-Industrial Technology	1983	
School of Environmental Science and Management	1977	
College of Forestry and Natural Resources	1910	
Graduate School	1972	
College of Human Ecology	1974	
College of Public Affairs and Development	1998	
College of Veterinary Medicine	1908	

UPLB is composed of 9 colleges and 2 schools offering a wide range of undergraduate and graduate programs. These colleges specialize in fields such as agriculture, forestry, engineering, human ecology, veterinary medicine, arts and sciences, economics, and development communication, providing academic and research opportunities.

=== Administration ===
As part of the University of the Philippines System, UPLB is governed by the 11-person UP Board of Regents, which is jointly chaired by the head of the Commission on Higher Education and the UP president.

The Board of Regents has the authority to approve the institution, merger, and abolition of degree programs as recommended by the UP president. It also has the power to confer degrees. The UP president, who is appointed by the Board of Regents, is the university's chief executive officer and the head of the faculty.

University of the Philippines Los Baños Chancellors
Name	Tenure of office
Abelardo G. Samonte	1973–1978
Emil Q. Javier	1979–1985
Raul P. De Guzman	1986–1991
Ruben B. Aspiras	1991–1993
Ruben L. Villareal	1993–1999
Wilfredo P. David	1999–2005
Luis Rey I. Velasco	2005–2011
Rex Victor O. Cruz	2011–2014
Fernando C. Sanchez Jr.	2014–2020
Jose V. Camacho Jr.	2020–
References

UPLB is administered by a chancellor who is elected by the UP Board of Regents to a three-year term. The chancellor may only serve for up to two terms. Under him are six vice-chancellors specializing in academic affairs, administration, community affairs, planning and development, research and extension, and student affairs.

The current chancellor is Dr Jose Camacho, the tenth to hold the office. Moreover, UPLB, through the UP System, is a member of the Association of Pacific Rim Universities, a consortium of leading research universities in the Asia-Pacific region.

=== Student government ===
The University Student Council (USC) is the "highest governing body of all UPLB students." Together with college student councils (CSCs), it assembles as the Student Legislative Chamber and acts as the highest policy-making body of the USC. The USC is composed of a chairperson, vice-chairperson, 10 councilors, a representative for each college/school with less than 500 students, and an additional college representative for every 500 students in excess of the first 500. Members are given one-year terms. CSCs have a similar structure, but with a different number of councilors based on the student population.

The Student Disciplinary Tribunal (SDT), under the Office of the Vice Chancellor for Student Affairs (OVCSA), is responsible for sanctioning erring students. Common offenses include student misconduct and fraternity rumbles. The SDT is composed of a chairperson, two appointees of the chancellor, a student juror, and a parent juror.

== Degree Programs ==
UPLB offers 148 undergraduate and graduate degree programs spanning the natural and social sciences, agriculture and environmental fields, engineering, communication, and human ecology through its nine colleges and two schools. It also awards high school diplomas through the University of the Philippines Rural High School (UPRHS), a subunit of the College of Arts and Sciences, which acts as a laboratory for its BS Mathematics and Science Teaching students.

=== Undergraduate Programs ===
College	Degree Program	Major Fields / Specializations	Duration
College of Agriculture and Food Science (CAFS)	BS Agriculture	Major fields: Animal Science; Horticulture; Agronomy; Plant Pathology; Entomology; Soil Science; Agricultural Extension; Agricultural Systems; Landscape Agroforestry; Weed Science	4 years
College of Agriculture and Food Science (CAFS)	BS Agricultural Biotechnology	Specializations: Crop Biotechnology; Crop Protection Biotechnology; Animal Biotechnology; Food Biotechnology	4 years
College of Agriculture and Food Science (CAFS)	BS Food Science and Technology	Major fields: Food Chemistry; Food Microbiology; Food Engineering	4 years
College of Arts and Sciences (CAS)	BS Agricultural Chemistry (joint with CAFS)	Specializations: Food Science; Animal Science; Soil Science; Crop Protection (Entomology/Plant Pathology/Weed Science); Plant Physiology; Agricultural Biotechnology	5 years
College of Arts and Sciences (CAS)	BA Communication Arts	Speech Communication; Writing; Theater Arts	4 years
College of Arts and Sciences (CAS)	BA Philosophy	Students should take specialization courses from disciplines other than philosophy.	4 years
College of Arts and Sciences (CAS)	BA Sociology	No specialization, but students must select electives under one social science discipline: Anthropology, History, Political Science, and Psychology.	4 years
College of Arts and Sciences (CAS)	BS Applied Mathematics	Majors: Actuarial Science, Operations Research, Biomathematics, Mathematical Finance	4 years
College of Arts and Sciences (CAS)	BS Applied Physics	Specializations: Instrumentation Physics; Experimental Physics; Computational Physics	4 years
College of Arts and Sciences (CAS)	BS Biology	Major fields: Cell and Molecular Biology; Ecology; Genetics; Microbiology; Plant Biology; Systematics; Wildlife Biology; Zoology	4 years
College of Arts and Sciences (CAS)	BS Chemistry	(single track)	4 years
College of Arts and Sciences (CAS)	BS Computer Science	(single track)	4 years
College of Arts and Sciences (CAS)	BS Mathematics	(single track)	4 years
College of Arts and Sciences (CAS)	BS Mathematics and Science Teaching	Major fields: Physics, Chemistry, Biology, Mathematics	4 years
College of Arts and Sciences (CAS)	BS Statistics	(single track)	4 years
College of Arts and Sciences (CAS)	B Sports Science		4 years
College of Arts and Sciences (CAS)	AA Sports Studies	(single track)	2 years
College of Development Communication (CDC)	BS Development Communication	(single track)	4 years
College of Development Communication (CDC)	AS Development Communication	(single track)	2 years
College of Economics and Management (CEM)	BS Accountancy	(single track)	4 years
College of Economics and Management (CEM)	BS Agricultural and Applied Economics	Production Economics and Farm Management; Agricultural Marketing and Price Analysis; Rural Finance and Cooperatives; Food and Nutrition Economics; Natural Resource Economics	4 years
College of Economics and Management (CEM)	BS Agribusiness Management and Entrepreneurship	Agribusiness Entrepreneurship; Agribusiness Management	4 years
College of Economics and Management (CEM)	BS Economics	Development Economics; Environmental Economics	4 years
College of Economics and Management (CEM)	AA Entrepreneurship	(single track)	2 years
College of Engineering and Agro-industrial Technology (CEAT)	BS Agricultural and Biosystems Engineering	Agricultural Food and Bioprocess Engineering; Agribiosystems Machinery and Power Engineering; Land and Water Resources Engineering; Agrometeorology; Biostructures and Environment Engineering	4 years
College of Engineering and Agro-industrial Technology (CEAT)	BS Chemical Engineering	Major fields: Sugar Technology; Pulp and Paper Technology; General Chemical Engineering	4 years
College of Engineering and Agro-industrial Technology (CEAT)	BS Civil Engineering	Construction Engineering and Management; Environmental and Energy Engineering; Geotechnical Engineering; Structural Engineering; Transportation Engineering; Water Resources and Coastal Engineering	4 years
College of Engineering and Agro-industrial Technology (CEAT)	BS Electrical Engineering	Power Engineering; Electronics Engineering; Computer Engineering	4 years
College of Engineering and Agro-industrial Technology (CEAT)	BS Industrial Engineering	Operations Research and Management Science; Production Systems; Information Systems; Ergonomics / Human Factors Engineering	4 years
College of Engineering and Agro-industrial Technology (CEAT)	BS Materials Engineering	(single track)	4 years
College of Engineering and Agro-industrial Technology (CEAT)	BS Mechanical Engineering	(single track)	4 years
College of Forestry and Natural Resources (CFNR)	BS Forestry	Major fields: Environmental Forestry, Production and Industrial Forestry, and Social Forestry and Agroforestry	4 years
College of Forestry and Natural Resources (CFNR)	AS Forestry	(single track)	2 years
College of Human Ecology (CHE)	BS Human Ecology	Human Settlements and Planning; Social Technology; Human and Family Development	4 years
College of Human Ecology (CHE)	BS Nutrition	(single track)	4 years
College of Veterinary Medicine (CVM)	Doctor of Veterinary Medicine	(single track)	6 years

=== Postgraduate Programs ===
Some graduate courses are being offered at the UP Professional School for Agriculture and the Environment (PSAE), an extension campus of UPLB in Panabo City, Davao del Norte. Dual degree programs are also being offered with UPLB's partner foreign universities.

Degree Type	Field / Major	Notes
Graduate Diploma; Master of Arts	Environmental Planning	Non-thesis option available for Master of Arts
Master of Agriculture	Agronomy	Non-thesis
Master of Agriculture	Horticulture	Non-thesis
Master in Animal Nutrition		Non-thesis; also offered at PSAE
Master in Clinical Nutrition		Non-thesis
Master in Food Engineering		Non-thesis; also offered at PSAE
Master in Social Development and Sustainability		Non-thesis
Master in Resilience Studies		Non-thesis
Master in Veterinary Epidemiology		Non-thesis
Master of Development Management and Governance		Non-thesis
Master of Information Technology		Non-thesis
Master in Public Affairs	Agrarian and Rurban Development Studies	Non-thesis; also offered at PSAE
Master in Public Affairs	Education Management	Non-thesis; also offered at PSAE
Master in Public Affairs	Strategic Planning and Public Policy	Non-thesis; also offered at PSAE
Master of Forestry; Master of Science (Forestry); PhD; PhD by Research	Forest Biological Sciences	Master of Forestry is non-thesis and is offered at PSAE.
Master of Forestry; Master of Science (Forestry); PhD; PhD by Research	Forest Resource Management	Master of Forestry is non-thesis and is offered at PSAE.
Master of Forestry; Master of Science (Forestry); PhD; PhD by Research	Silviculture and Forest Influences	Master of Forestry is non-thesis and is offered at PSAE.
Master of Forestry; Master of Science (Forestry); PhD; PhD by Research	Social Forestry	Master of Forestry is non-thesis and is offered at PSAE.
Master of Forestry; Master of Science (Forestry); PhD; PhD by Research	Wood Science and Technology	Master of Forestry is non-thesis and is offered at PSAE.
Master of Management	Agribusiness Management and Entrepreneurship	Non-thesis
Master of Management	Business Management	Non-thesis
Master of Management	Cooperative Management	Non-thesis
Master of Professional Studies	Food and Nutrition Planning	Non-thesis
Professional Masters	Tropical Marine Ecosystems Management	Non-thesis; Joint program with UP MSI-UP Diliman and UP Visayas
Master of Arts	Communication Arts	
Master of Arts	Sociology	
Master of Science	Applied Nutrition	
Master of Science; PhD; PhD by Research	Agricultural Chemistry	
Master of Science; PhD; PhD by Research	Agricultural Economics	
Master of Science; PhD; PhD by Research	Agricultural Engineering	
Master of Science; PhD; PhD by Research	Agrometeorology	
Master of Science; PhD; PhD by Research	Agronomy	
Master of Science; PhD; PhD by Research	Animal Science	
Master of Science; PhD; PhD by Research	Applied Physics	Specializations: Instrumentation Physics; Experimental Physics; Computational Physics
Master of Science; PhD; PhD by Research	Biochemistry	
Master of Science; PhD; PhD by Research	Botany	
Master of Science; PhD; PhD by Research	Chemical Engineering	
Master of Science; PhD; PhD by Research	Chemistry	
Master of Science; PhD; PhD by Research	Community Development	PhD is also offered at PSAE.
Master of Science; PhD; PhD by Research	Computer Science	
Master of Science; PhD; PhD by Research	Development Communication	PhD is also offered at PSAE.
Master of Science; PhD; PhD by Research	Development Management and Governance	
Master of Science; PhD; PhD by Research	Economics	Fields: Development Economics; Environmental Economics
Master of Science; PhD; PhD by Research	Entomology	MS is also offered at PSAE.
Master of Science; PhD; PhD by Research	Environmental Science	MS and PhD are also offered at PSAE.
Master of Science; PhD; PhD by Research	Extension Education	
Master of Science; PhD; PhD by Research	Family Resource Management	
Master of Science; PhD; PhD by Research	Food Science	
Master of Science; PhD; PhD by Research	Genetics	
Master of Science; PhD; PhD by Research	Horticulture	
Master of Science; PhD; PhD by Research	Industrial Engineering	
Master of Science; PhD; PhD by Research	Mathematics	
Master of Science; PhD; PhD by Research	Microbiology	
Master of Science; PhD; PhD by Research	Molecular Biology and Biotechnology	
Master of Science; PhD; PhD by Research	Natural Resources Conservation	
Master of Science; PhD; PhD by Research	Physics	
Master of Science; PhD; PhD by Research	Plant Breeding	
Master of Science; PhD; PhD by Research	Plant Genetic Resources Conservation and Management	
Master of Science; PhD; PhD by Research	Plant Pathology	
Master of Science; PhD; PhD by Research	Rural Sociology	MS is also offered at PSAE.
Master of Science; PhD; PhD by Research	Soil Science	MS and PhD are also offered at PSAE.
Master of Science; PhD; PhD by Research	Statistics	
Master of Science; PhD; PhD by Research	Veterinary Medicine	
Master of Science; PhD; PhD by Research	Wildlife Science	
Master of Science; PhD; PhD by Research	Zoology	
Dual Doctor of Philosophy by Research	(with University of Montpellier, France; University of Reading in the United Kingdom; University of Liverpool in the United Kingdom; and Curtin University in Australia in collaboration with UP Mindanao)	

== Academics ==
=== Admission and graduation ===
UPLB admits more than 2,500 students and produces about 1,800 graduates every year. Undergraduate admission is determined by the University of the Philippines College Admission Test (UPCAT). Examinees that select UPLB as their preferred campus and garner a University Predicted Grade (UPG) within the standard cut-off are automatically eligible for admission. Those who do not automatically qualify may file an appeal for reconsideration if their UPG is within the actual cut-off, though the appeal process does not guarantee admission. The cut-off scores may be adjusted according to a variety of factors. In 2010 and 2011, UPLB had a standard UPG cut-off of 2.42 while the actual cut-off was 2.8. But in 2014 and 2015, UPLB had a standard cut off score of 2.3. Seventy percent of slots are given to incoming freshmen with the highest scores, while the remaining thirty percent are given to public high school students and members of minority groups. Before the UPCAT was used for admission, UPCA only admitted the top 5 percent of Philippine high school graduates.

High school freshman admission, on the other hand, is determined by the eight-hour-long UPRHS Entrance Examination. Only the top 125 examinees are admitted. Sophomore transferees take the two-day UPRHS Validation Examination, and are admitted depending on the available slots.

Normally, a student who completes the program may graduate with honors if his general weighted average (GWA) is 1.75 or above. The title summa cum laude is awarded to graduates who obtain a GWA of 1.20 or above, magna cum laude to graduates with a GWA of 1.45 to 1.20, and cum laude to graduates with a GWA of between 1.75 and 1.45. As of 2011 there have been 30 summa cum laudes who have graduated from UPLB.

=== Tuition and financial aid ===
With the passage of Republic Act 10931, tuition and fees have been waived for students pursuing their degrees for the first time in exchange for return service, although it is possible to opt out and pay the full tuition instead.

Before this law was passed, the base tuition fee per unit in UPLB was ₱1,000 (US$23). Along with other UP constituents, UPLB implemented the Socialized Tuition and Financial Assistance Program (STFAP), wherein students with annual family incomes between ₱1,000,000 (US$23,000) and ₱500,000 (US$11,500) were charged the base tuition fee; students with annual family incomes between ₱500,000 and ₱135,000 (US$3,110) were charged ₱600 (US$14) per unit; those whose incomes fell between ₱135,000 and ₱80,000 (US$1,840) were charged ₱300 (US$7); while those whose incomes fell below ₱80,000 were not charged any fees. Those with annual family incomes above ₱1,000,000 were charged ₱1,500 (US$35) per unit.

=== Accreditation ===
UPLB is identified by the Commission on Higher Education as a Center of Excellence in Agriculture, Agricultural Engineering, Biology, Forestry, Information Technology, Environmental Science, Development Communication, Statistics and Veterinary Medicine, as well as a Center of Development in Chemical Engineering. Five undergraduate programs were given the ASEAN University Network-Quality Assessment certification: BS Biology, BS Agricultural and Biosystems Engineering, BS Development Communication, BS Forestry and BS Agriculture.

=== Libraries and collections ===
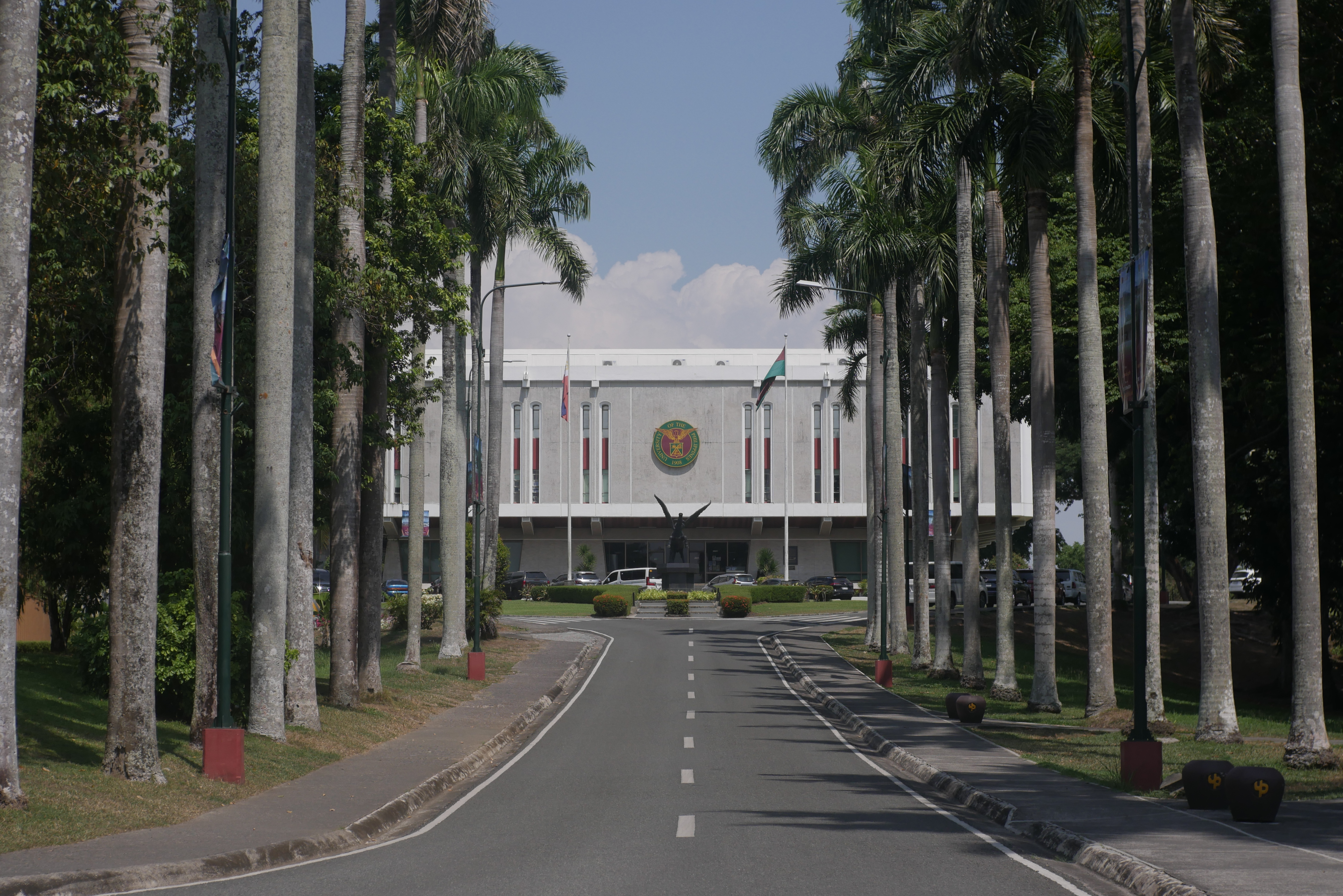
Bienvenido Maria Gonzalez Hall, which houses the UPLB Main University Library

As of 2026, the UPLB University Library, composed of the Main Library, 8 College and 2 Special libraries, and a High School Library, holds a total of 346,061 volumes. It periodically receives publications from United Nations agencies (including the UNFAO, UN-HABITAT and UNU) and the World Bank. It is a contributor to the International Information System for Agricultural Services and Technology, contributing nearly 30,000 titles between 1975 and 2010.

195,282 of these volumes are housed at the Main Library, while the rest are in unit libraries. The Main Library also houses theses, digital sources, and 1,215 serial titles, among other materials. It has a total floor area of 6,336 m^{2} (68,200 sq ft) and a seating capacity of 510, making it the largest library in UPLB.

One of UPLB's unit libraries is the College of Veterinary Medicine/Institute of Animal Sciences-College of Agriculture and Food Science (CVM/IAS-CAFS) Library. It has 17,798 volumes and 198 serial titles, and a total floor area of 609.25 m^{2} (6,557.9 sq ft). It claims to hold the largest collection on veterinary and animal sciences in the country.

UPLB manages the UPLB Museum of Natural History, which was established in 1976 at the foothills of Mt. Makiling. It holds over 600,000 biological specimens, including half of the specimens from the Philippine Water Bug Inventory Project, and a third of the Dioscoro S. Rabor Wildlife Collection. More than half of the specimens belong to the entomological collection. While most of its collections are in its main building, some are housed in other UPLB units.

== Campus ==
UPLB Campus map (excluding College of Public Affairs, IRRI and off-site land grants)
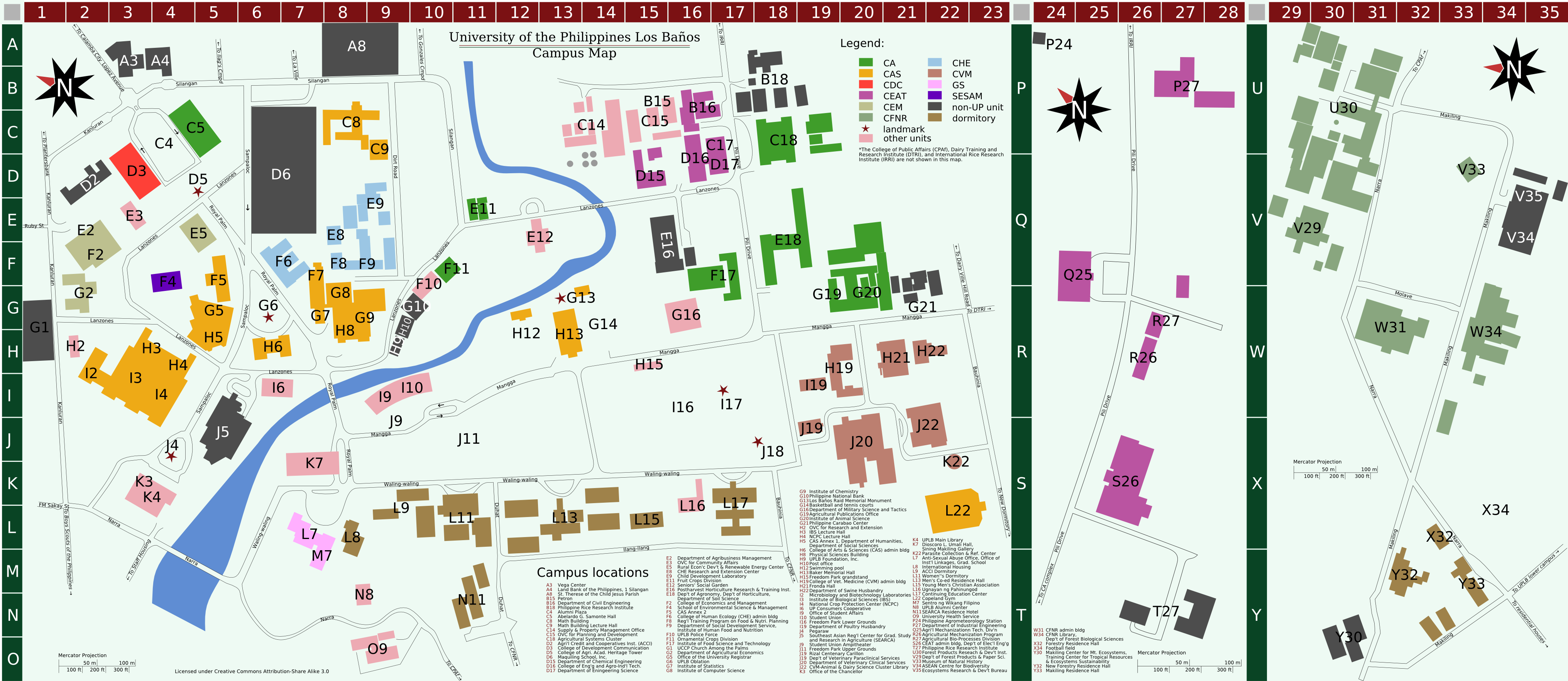

The UPLB campus consists of 14,665 ha (36,240 acres) spread across the provinces of Laguna, Negros Occidental, and Quezon.

=== Los Baños campus ===
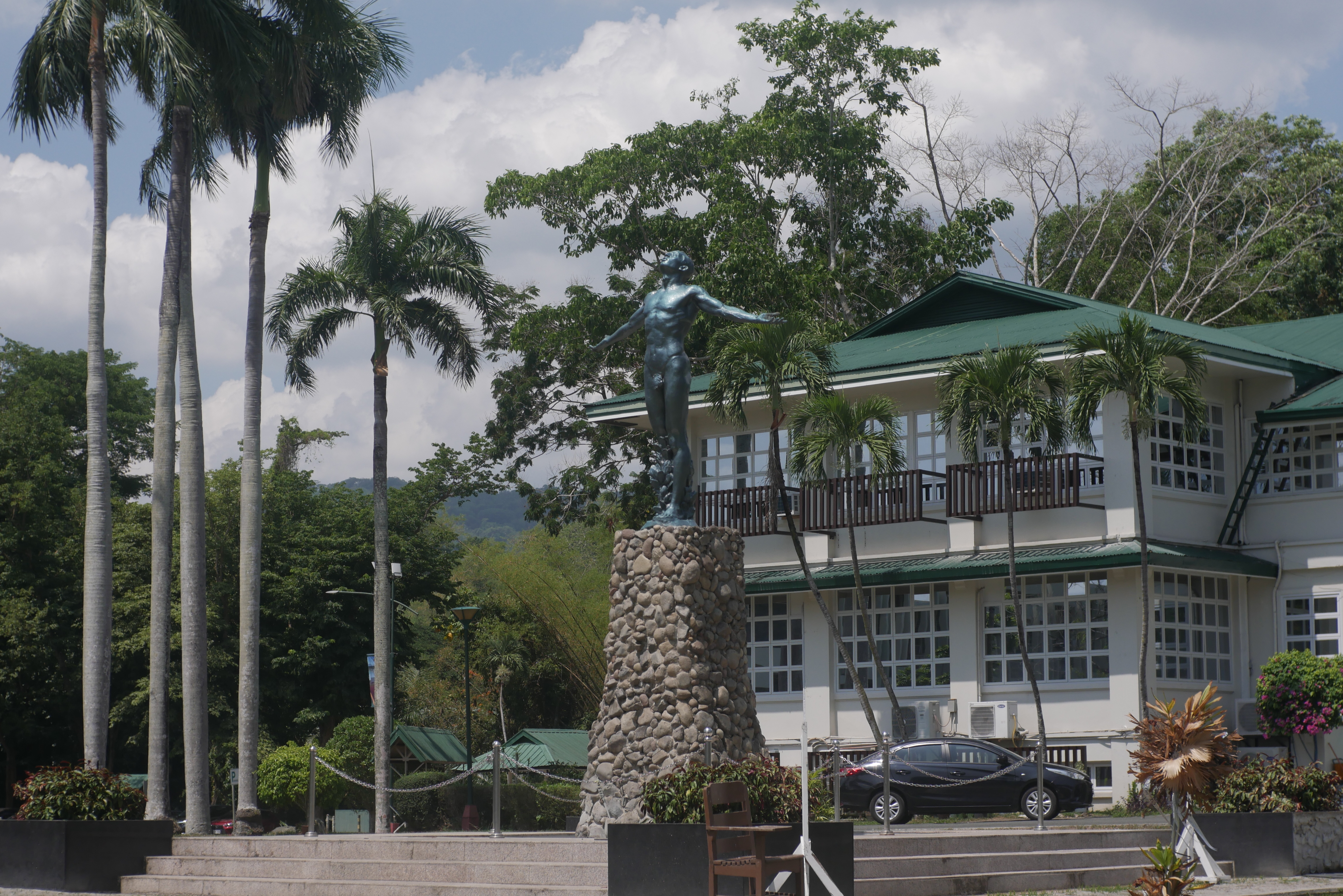
The Oblation statue at the University of the Philippines Los Baños

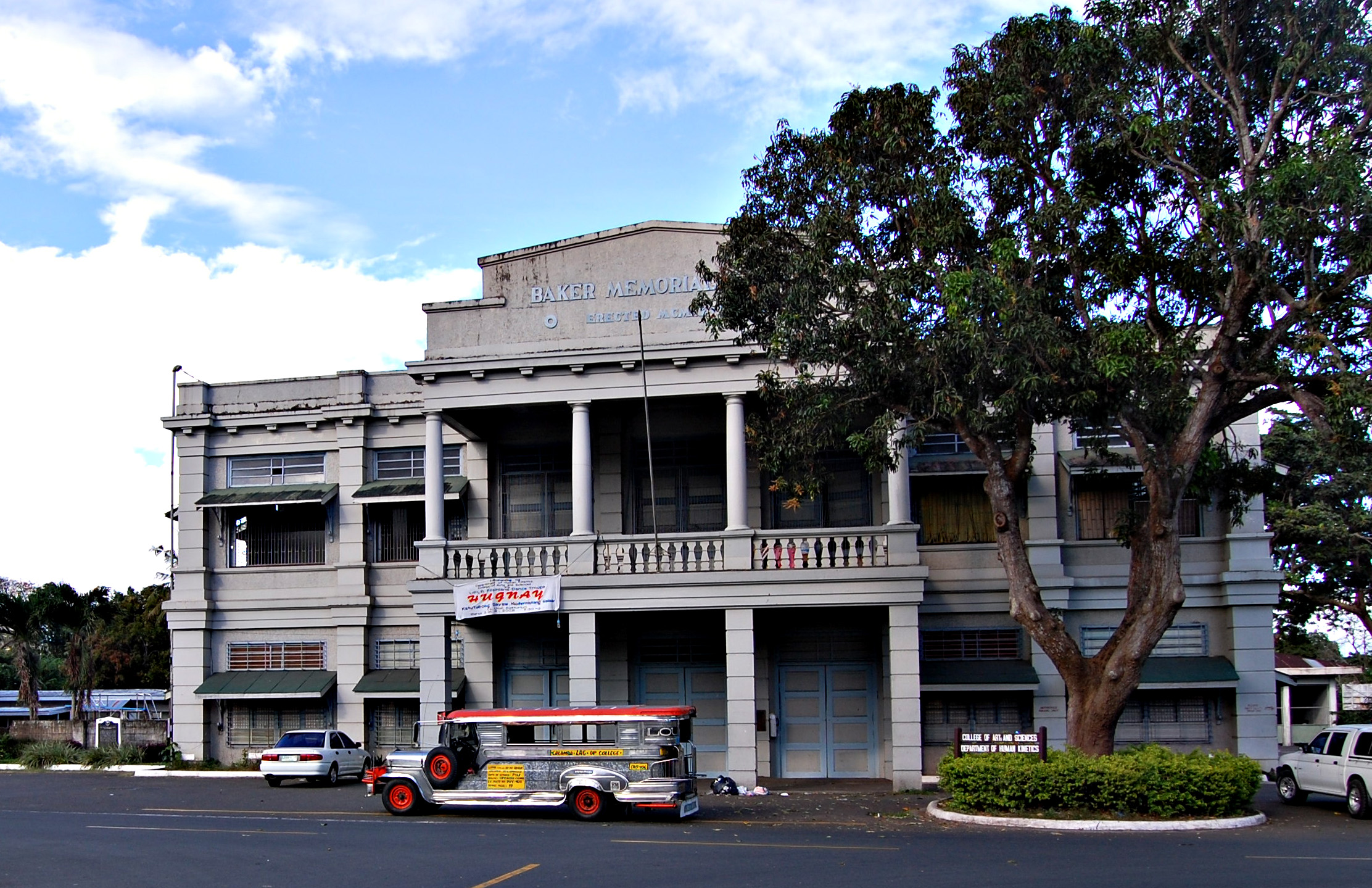
Baker Memorial Hall

The 1,098 ha (2,710-acre) Los Baños campus houses UPLB's academic facilities, as well as experimental farms for agriculture and biotechnology research. The more prominent buildings in the Los Baños campus, such as the Dioscoro L. Umali Hall, Obdulia F. Sison Hall (formerly the Continuing Education Center), and Student Union were designed by National Artist for Architecture Leandro Locsin. Other notable landmarks include the iconic Oblation, UPCA Alumni Plaza (known to locals as "Carabao Park"), Dioscoro L. Umali Freedom Park, and Baker Memorial Hall.

UPLB is designated as caretaker of the 4,347 ha (10,740-acre) Makiling Forest Reserve (often referred to as the "upper campus," in contrast to the "lower campus" set at the foot of Makiling). It houses facilities of the College of Forestry and Natural Resources, College of Public Affairs, UPLB Museum of Natural History and the University Health Service, among others. The reserve is home to diverse flora and fauna, and has more tree species than the continental United States (an area 32 times bigger than the Philippines). It serves as an outdoor laboratory for faculty and students of the university.

=== Land grants ===
UPLB has three major land grants: the Laguna-Quezon Land Grant, La Carlota Land Grant, and Laguna Land Grant.

The 5,719 ha (14,130-acre) Laguna-Quezon Land Grant is located in the towns of Real, Quezon, and Siniloan, Laguna, and was acquired in February 1930. It covers some portions of the Sierra Madre mountain range, and currently hosts the university's Citronella and lemongrass plantations. The 705 ha (1,740-acre) La Carlota Land Grant is situated in Negros Occidental, a province in the Western Visayas region. Acquired in May 1964, it houses the PCARRD-DOST La Granja Agricultural Research Center, which serves as a research center for various upland crops. Meanwhile, the 3,336 ha (8,240-acre) Laguna Land Grant located in Paete, Laguna, also acquired in 1964, is mostly undeveloped. Numerous parties have expressed interest in developing the land grants; however, UPLB has not entertained the potential investors due to the "lack of a solid development plan."

=== UP Professional School for Agriculture and the Environment ===
The UP Professional School for Agriculture and the Environment (UP PSAE) in Panabo City was established in 2016 to cater to agribusiness professionals in the Davao metropolitan area. Supervised by the UPLB Graduate School, UP PSAE was established through a grant by Damosa Land Inc., a leading property developer in Mindanao.

== Research ==
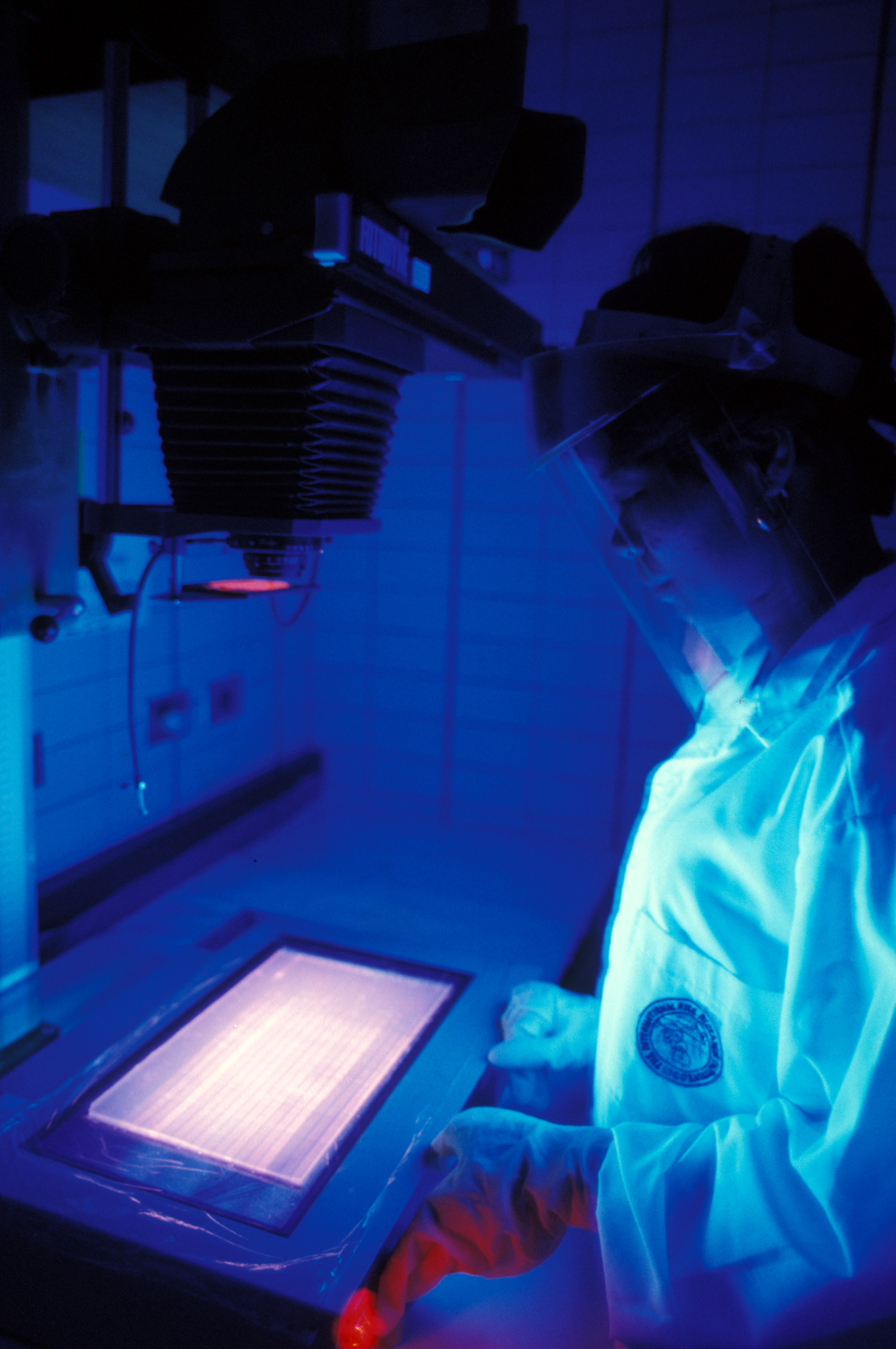
An IRRI researcher studying rice DNA under ultraviolet light

=== Research centers ===
Six research institutes were named Centers of Excellence in Research via presidential decree: Institute of Plant Breeding, Institute of Food Science and Technology, Institute of Animal Science, National Crop Protection Center, Farming Systems and Soil Resources Institute, and National Institute of Molecular Biology and Biotechnology.

UPLB hosts a number of international research institutes, including the Southeast Asian Regional Center for Graduate Study and Research in Agriculture, the ASEAN Center for Biodiversity, the International Rice Research Institute, the World Fish Center, the World Agroforestry Center, and the Asia Rice Foundation. The APEC Center for Technology Exchange and Training for Small and Medium Enterprises (ACTETSME), established in 1996 through the initiative of then President Fidel V. Ramos during the Asia-Pacific Economic Cooperation (APEC) Leaders' Meeting in Seattle, USA, is also located at the university's Science & Technology Park.

Local research institutions such as the Department of Environment and Natural Resources' Ecosystems Research and Development Bureau, Department of Science and Technology's Forest Products Research and Development Institute, and Department of Agriculture's Philippine Carabao Center are headquartered or have offices at the university. The main office of IRRI's Philippine counterpart, the Philippine Rice Research Institute, used to be located at UPLB but was transferred to Muñoz, Nueva Ecija in 1990. It continues to maintain a research office at the university.

=== Scientific journals ===
Three UPLB-published journals, the Philippine Agricultural Scientist, the Philippine Journal of Veterinary Medicine, and the Journal of Environmental Sciences and Management are listed in the SCImago Journal Rankings. SCImago gave these an h-index (a measure of "actual scientific productivity" and "apparent scientific impact") of 18, 6, and 12, respectively. These journals are also listed in the ISI Web of Knowledge, along with two other UPLB-published journals: the Philippine Entomologist and the Philippine Journal of Crop Science.

=== Biotechnology research ===
The National Institute of Molecular Biology and Biotechnology at UPLB

One of the earliest innovations of UPLB was the production of CAC 87 sugar cane in 1919. This high-yielding variety is resistant to fiji and mosaic viruses, and produces more sucrose than other varieties. Its derivatives significantly increased sugar cane production in the Philippines. Between 1921 and 1939, cattle, poultry, and swine breeding programs produced new breeds, namely the Philamin (a hybrid of the Hereford, Nellore and native cattle), Berkjala (a variety of the Berkshire and local Jala-Jala pig, resistant to hog cholera) and the Los Baños Cantonese chicken, which produces more eggs.

Research in the 1960s allowed for the efficient mass production of macapuno (a type of coconut with jelly-like meat), while studies started in 1998 that produced delayed-ripening papaya continue to this day. The research is credited for the increase in Philippine papaya production, with the 75,896-metric-ton (83,661-short-ton) production of year 2000 rising to 164,100 metric tons (180,900 short tons) in 2007. In 1974, UPLB researchers discovered mango flower induction by potassium nitrate, making it possible for the fruit to be available year-round. It is credited for tripling yield and for "revolutionizing" the country's mango industry.

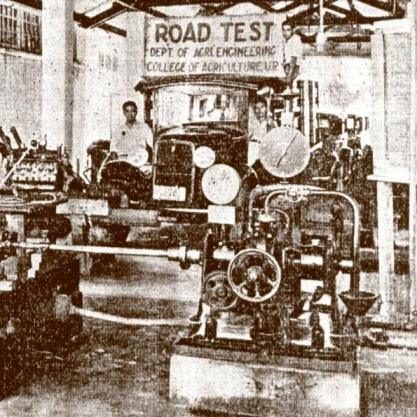
This 1929 DeSoto De Luxe ran over 50,000 kilometres (31,000 mi) using gasanol for a period of five years.

=== Biofuel research ===
Studies at the university conducted in the 1930s found that gasoline with 15–20 percent ethanol, dubbed "gasanol", was more efficient than pure gasoline. Biofuel research in 2007 under the National Biofuel Program has considered new sources of biofuel, such as coconuts, Moringa oleifera, and sunflower seeds. Efforts have been concentrated on the Jatropha curcas due to its low maintenance and fast yield. Other fuel, such as coconut biofuel, were found to be too costly. Biofuel from Sorghum bicolor, Manihot esculenta crantz and Chlorella vulgaris are also being studied.

=== Nanotechnology research ===
UPLB's nanotechnology program focuses on research and innovation in agriculture, food, and forest products. It has developed nanosensors and nanostructured materials from agriculture by-products, helping improve agricultural productivity. Moreover, it has developed and commercialized "nanofertilizers" that can be substituted for synthetic fertilizers. Researchers found that these nanofertilizers reduced fertilizer application by up to 50 percent compared with using conventional fertilizers, and are less likely to cause soil toxicity and imbalance. Studies showed that using the nanofertilizers increased the net profit of farmers by 40 percent in rice, 20 percent in corn, and 48 percent in potato. It also increased eggplant yield by 36 percent, cabbage by 5 percent, and cane tonnage by 46 percent. Significant increases in yield were also observed for coffee, cacao, and banana. In 2021, the government launched a program to optimize the manufacturing of these nanofertilizers.

== Student life ==
=== Student organizations ===
As of May 2020, there are 159 recognized student organizations in UPLB. Of these, 68 are academic, 15 cultural, one international, eight religious, 30 socio-civic, six sports and recreational, 11 varsitarian, 13 fraternities, and 7 sororities. There are also a number of organizations that exist but are not officially recognized by the university. Regional organizations were not recognized by UPLB prior to September 2008, when the University of the Philippines board of regents repealed Chapter 72 Article 444 of the 1984 University of the Philippines Code, which states that "organizations which are provincial, sectional or regional in nature shall not be allowed in the University System." Likewise, Section 3 of the code states that "the University of the Philippines System is a public, secular, non-profit institution of higher learning." Due to this, religious organizations have had some difficulty in getting recognized. Only recognized organizations are allowed to use UPLB facilities. The system of student organizations in UPLB is different from that of other UP constituents in that freshmen are not allowed to join any organization until they have earned at least 30 units.

=== Loyalty Day ===
Every October 10, UPLB celebrates Loyalty Day, which has also become UPLB's alumni homecoming. The celebration commemorates events in 1918 when more than half of students and faculty (193 out of 300 students and 27 out of 32 faculty), including two women, enlisted in the Philippine National Guard for service in France during World War I. The volunteers never saw action as the Allied Forces signed an armistice with Germany during the same year, essentially ending the war.

=== Feb Fair ===
The university holds a major campus fair, known as "Feb Fair", during Valentine's week. The fair was initially held to express opposition to martial law under Philippine President Ferdinand Marcos, who abolished student organizations and student councils.

=== Media ===
The UPLB Perspective is the official student publication of UPLB. The university administration has been repeatedly criticized for allegedly interfering in the selection process of its editor-in-chief. Other campus publications include UPLB Horizon and UPLB Link. Meanwhile, the College of Development Communication (CDC) publishes the experimental community newspaper Los Baños Times.

CDC runs the radio station DZLB 1116, the oldest educational radio station in the Philippines. Founded in August 1964 with a broadcast power of 250 watts at 1210 kHz, the station serves as a distance education tool and training facility. It currently operates through a five-kilowatt transmitter located near the main gate of the campus. The station was the 1994 recipient of the KBP Golden Dove Award for Best AM Radio Station as well as a Catholic Mass Media Award for Best Educational Radio Program in 2010.

== People ==
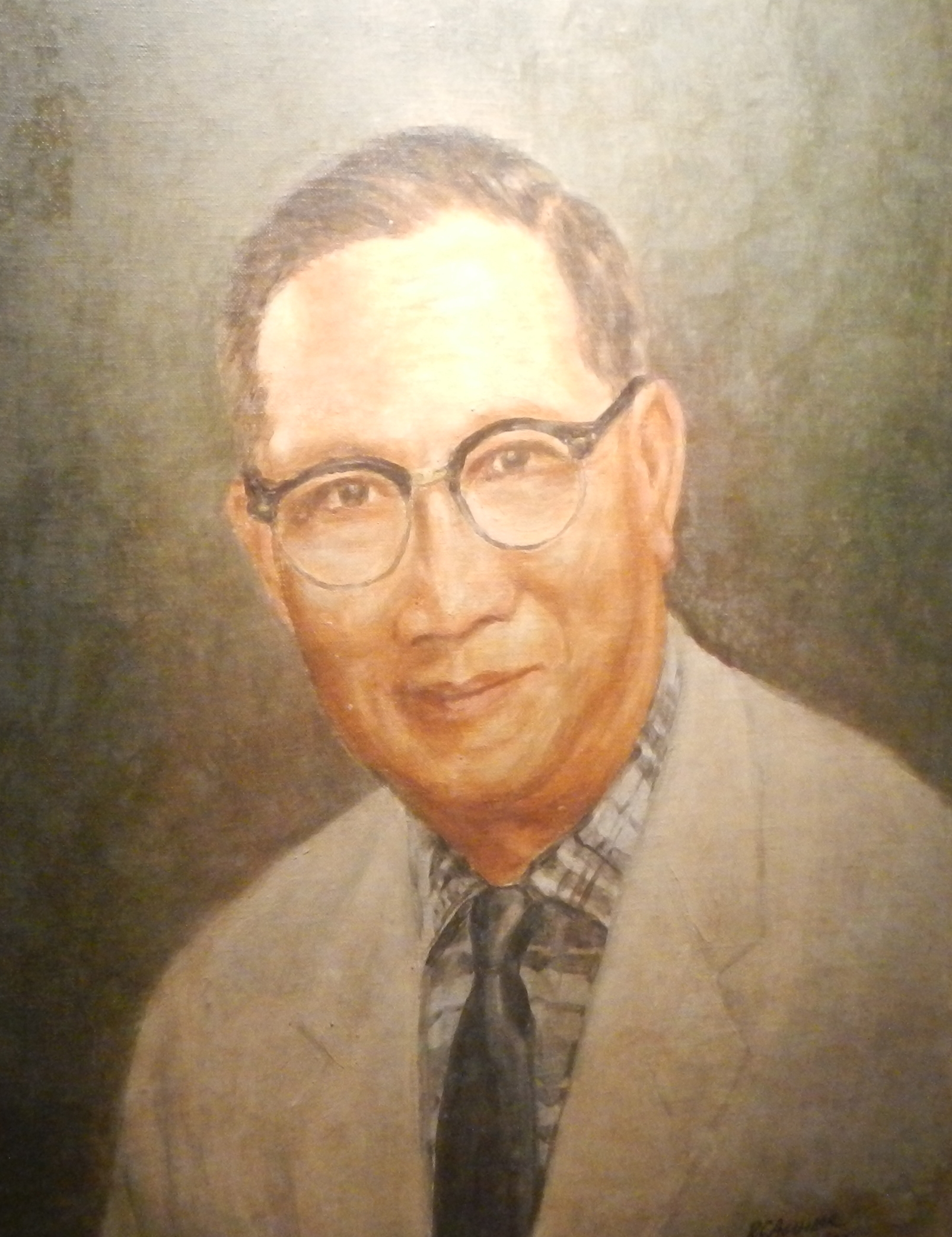
National Scientist Eduardo Quisumbing

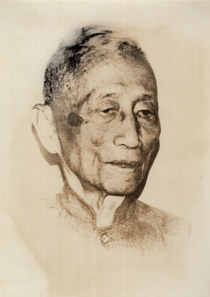
National Scientist Francisco O. Santos

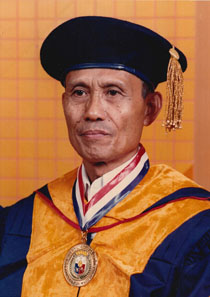
National Scientist Pedro B. Escuro

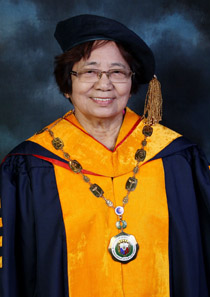
National Scientist Dolores Ramirez

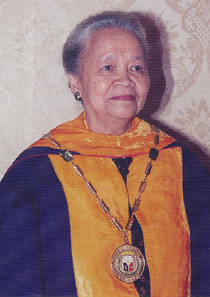
National Scientist Gelia T. Castillo

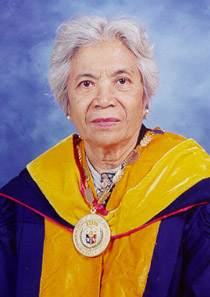
National Scientist Clare Baltazar

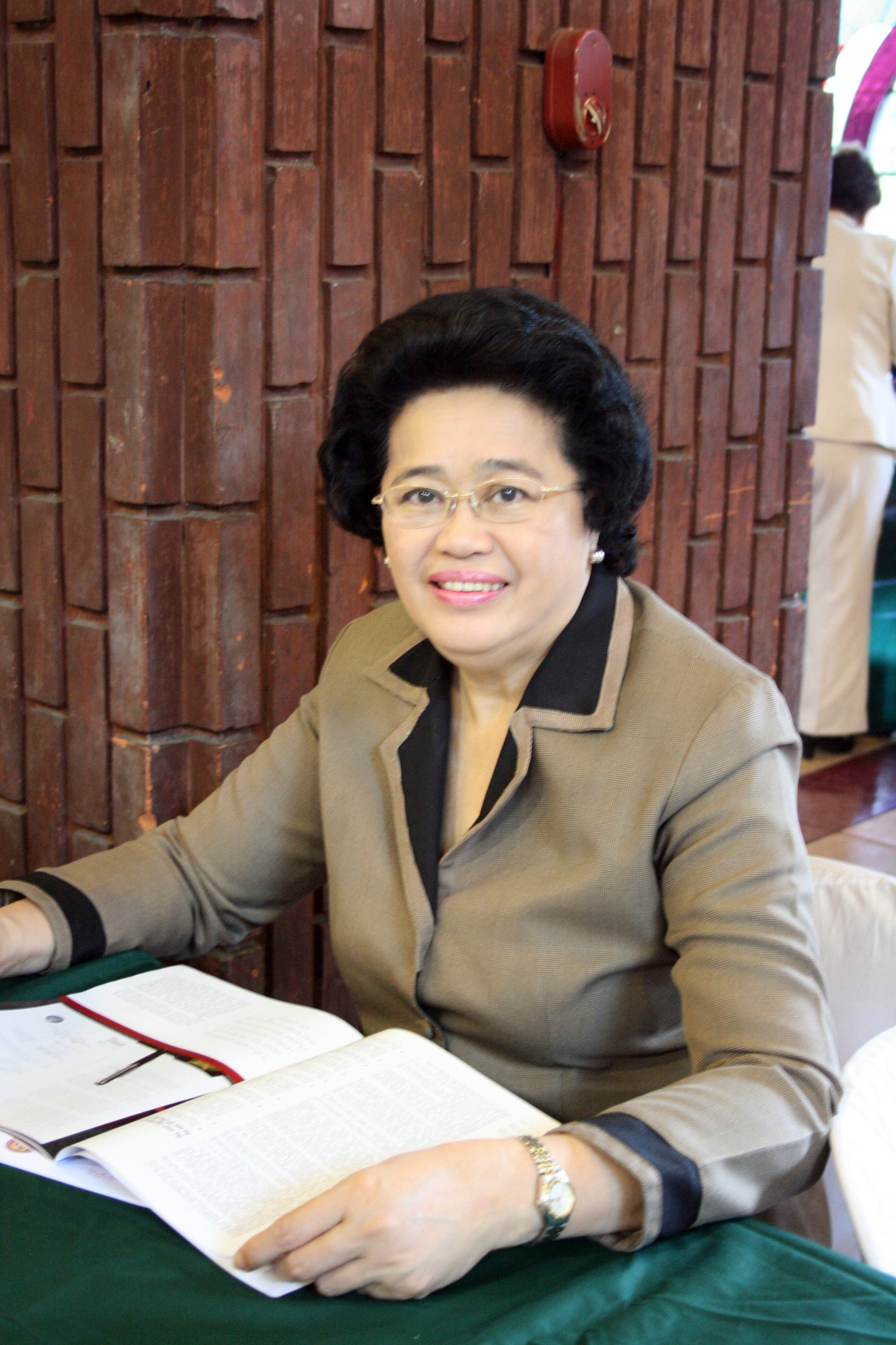
Former U.P. President Emerlinda R. Roman

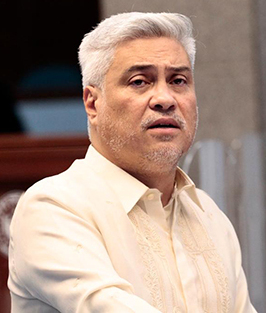
Former Senate President Migz Zubiri

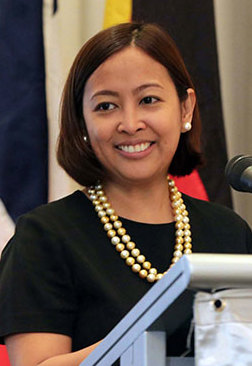
Former Makati City Mayor Abigail Binay

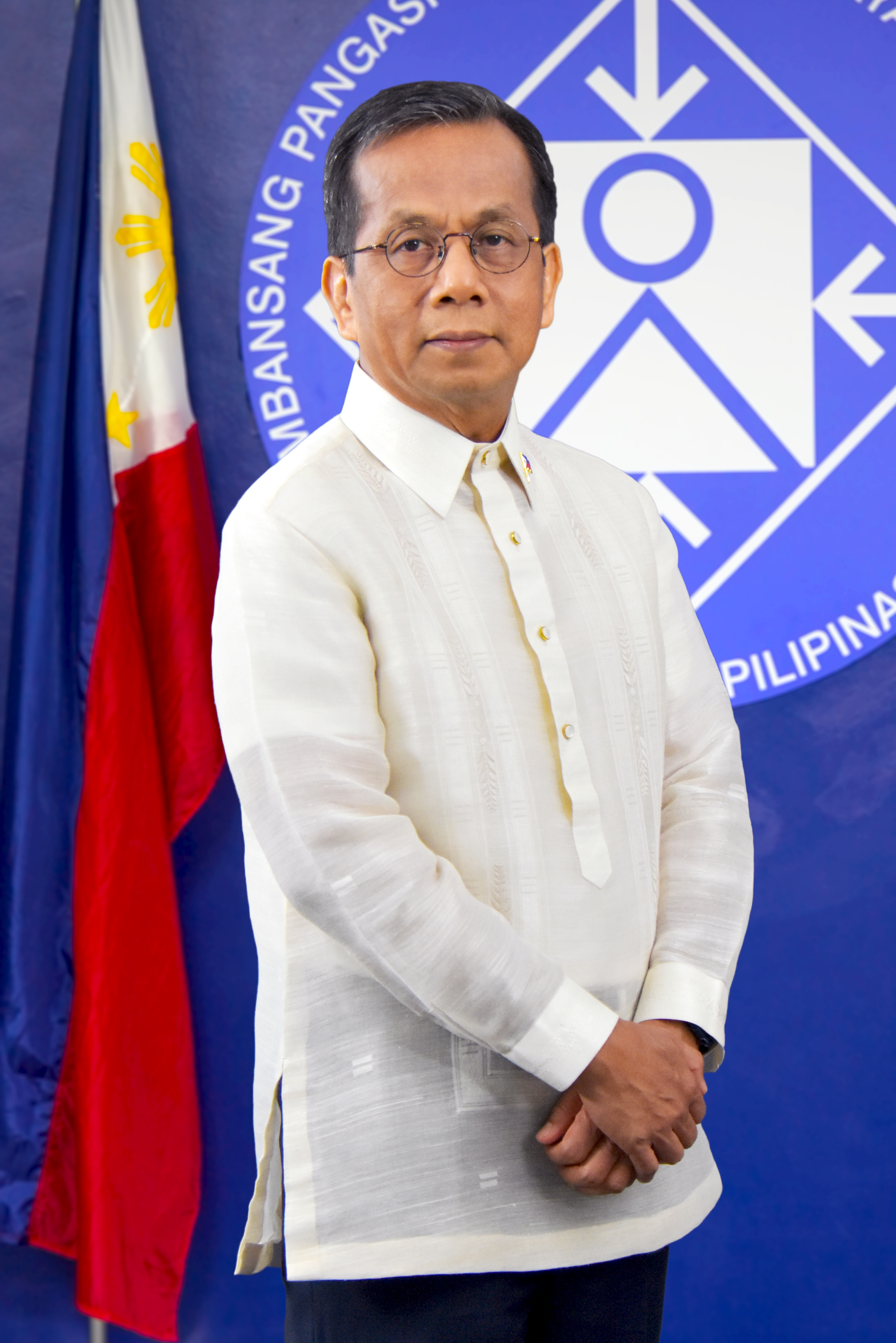
Socioeconomic Planning Secretary Arsenio Balisacan

UPLB alumni have been recognized in a wide range of fields. They include 16 scientists awarded the title National Scientist of the Philippines, members of the United Nations Intergovernmental Panel on Climate Change, Palanca Award winners, as well as political and business leaders.

=== Scientists ===
People associated with the university include alumni, faculty, and honorary degree recipients. They include 16 out of 41 National Scientists of the Philippines: Eduardo Quisumbing, 1980 (Plant Taxonomy, Systematics, and Morphology), Francisco M. Fronda, 1983 (Animal Husbandry), Francisco O. Santos, 1983 (Human Nutrition and Agricultural Chemistry), Julian Banzon, 1986 (Chemistry), Dioscoro L. Umali, 1986 (Agriculture and Rural Development), Pedro B. Escuro, 1994 (Genetics and Plant Breeding), Dolores Ramirez, 1998 (Biochemical Genetics and Cytogenetics), Jose R. Velasco, 1998 (Plant Physiology), Gelia T. Castillo, 1999 (Rural Sociology), Bienvenido O. Juliano, 2000 (Organic Chemistry), Clare R. Baltazar, 2001 (Systematic Entomology), Benito Vergara, 2001 (Plant Physiology), Ricardo M. Lantican, 2005 (Plant Breeding), Teodulo M. Topacio Jr. 2008 (Veterinary Medicine), Ramon Barba 2014 (Horticulture), Emil Q. Javier 2019 (Agriculture), and Romulo Davide 2024 (Nematology).

Four UPLB scientists are members of the United Nations Intergovernmental Panel on Climate Change that won the Nobel Prize in 2007: Rex Victor Cruz, Felino P. Lansigan, Rodel D. Lasco, and Juan M. Pulhin. National Scientist Romulo G. Davide was given a Ramon Magsaysay Award in 2012 for "his steadfast passion in placing the power and discipline of science in the hands of Filipino farmers".

=== Political leaders ===
UPLB alumni have served as senior government officials under various administrations. Those currently in office include Senate President Migz Zubiri, House of Representatives Deputy Speaker Isidro Ungab, Socioeconomic Planning Secretary Arsenio Balisacan, Catanduanes Governor Patrick Azanza and Makati City mayor Abigail Binay. Trade and Industry Secretary Alfredo Pascual was a faculty member prior to his appointment.

Both of its honorary degree recipients held influential roles in their respective countries' politics. They are Salim Ahmed Salim, former Prime Minister of Tanzania, and Sirindhorn, Princess of Thailand.

=== Academic officials ===
Former UP presidents Bienvenido Maria Gonzalez (1939–1943; 1945–1951), Emil Q. Javier (1993-1999) and Emerlinda R. Roman (2005-2011) graduated from UPLB, along with the sitting chancellors of UP Baguio, UP Mindanao, and UP Open University. Alumni who held ranking posts at other academic and research institutions include Jikun Huang, Founder and Director of the Center for Chinese Agricultural Policy of the Chinese Academy of Sciences, Kyu-Seong Lee, Director-General of South Korea's Rural Development Administration, and Weerapon Thongma, President of Maejo University in Thailand.

=== Business executives ===
San Miguel Corporation Chairman and CEO Eduardo Cojuangco Jr. and Bounty Agro Ventures President Ronald Daniel Mascariñas also attended UPLB.

== See also ==
- University of the Philippines
- University of the Philippines Baguio
- University of the Philippines Cebu
- University of the Philippines Diliman
- University of the Philippines Manila
- University of the Philippines Mindanao
- University of the Philippines Open University
- University of the Philippines Tacloban
- University of the Philippines Visayas
