= Pedro B. Escuro =

Filipino scientist who specialized in genetics and plant breeding

Pedro B. Escuro ONS
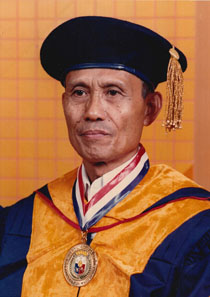
- Official portrait, National Academy of Science and Technology
- Born: August 2, 1923; Nabua, Camarines Sur, Philippine Islands
- Died: September 8, 2000 (aged 77)
- Education: University of the Philippines Los Baños; Cornell University; University of Minnesota
- Awards: Order of National Scientists of the Philippines (1994)
- Scientific career
- Fields: Agriculture, Genetics and Plant Breeding
- Workplaces: University of the Philippines Los Baños

Pedro B. Escuro (2 August 1923 – 8 September 2000) was a Filipino scientist who specialized in genetics and plant breeding. As a plant breeder, he made significant contributions to rice breeding. He provided guidance for the development, isolation, and release of nine Seed Board rice varieties: Milpal 4, HBD-2, Azmil 26 and C-22 for upland rice production, and C-18, C4-63, C4-137, C-168 and C-12 for lowland rice production.

== Biography ==
=== Early life ===
Escuro was born on August 2, 1923 to Filipino farmers in Nabua, Camarines Sur. As a young man, he was trained to do hard labour and everyday chores such as drawing water from a nearby deep well for household and domestic use.

=== Education ===
He graduated with a degree in Agronomy as magna cum laude from the University of the Philippines College of Agriculture in 1952. During his study there, he was taught by Dr. Dioscoro Umali. In 1954, he received his master's degree from Cornell University and received his doctoral degree (Ph.D.) in Genetics and Plant Breeding from the University of Minnesota in 1959.

=== Career ===
As a professor at the University of the Philippines Los Baños, he taught Emil Q. Javier, who later became a former president of the University of the Philippines.

== Scientific studies ==
=== Observations on Philippine agriculture ===
According to Escuro in his 1993 paper, "Role of rice in the national economy", he analyzed different factors that affects the lack of the Philippines' self-sufficient rice production.

In terms of non-crop production problems he blamed high population growth, which at the time the Philippines has 2.6 percent annual growth rate, the highest among its Asian neighbors. He also acknowledged natural calamities and a decrease of suitable land for rice production. In relation to crop production, he stated the there are limited resources for farmers to access such as available credit, high cost of fertilizers, irrigation, and lack of post harvest facilities near farms.

At last, he suggested a birth control program to reduce population growth, limit the importation of rice during serious shortages of "palay" productions, prohibit the conferment of fertile lands and conversion of irrigated rice lands to non-agricultural purposes, and provide credit facilities accessible to farmers, etc.

=== Plant breeding ===
Through the guidance of Escuro, the Philippines was able to develop, isolate, and release nine Seed Board rice varieties. Among these is the C4-137 variety which was considered the best in lowland rice production.

In 1973, Escuro, along with Benjamin Ona, started an intensive programme at the University of the Philippines, Los Baños in dry season to find suitable wheat varieties for improved agricultural production.

According to the Philippine Rice Research Institute, Escuro was a pioneer of wheat breeding in the Philippines. He tested a few wheat varieties for adaptability until it reached 40,000 accessions. He screened them in terms of adaptability to local growing conditions.

== Awards ==
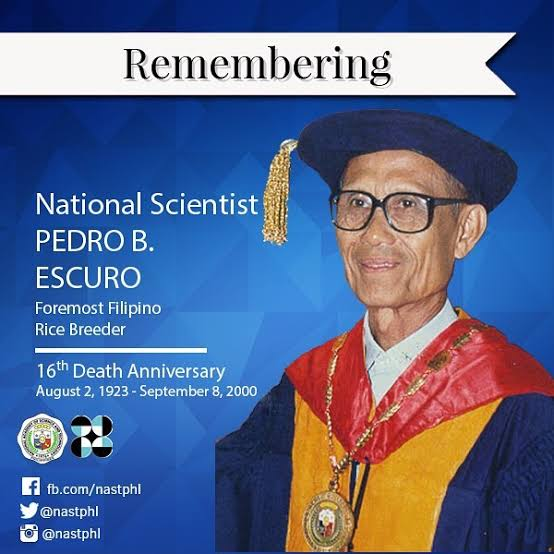
Remembrance of Escuro's 16th death anniversary, NAST Philippines

Here were some of the awards Escuro received during his lifetime:

- Distinguished Professorial Award in agriculture, University of the Philippines, 1973
- 1967 Presidential Plaque of Merit, Presidential Award
- D. Sc. honoris causa, 1974
- J. Gonzales Gold Medal, 1952
- PHILCUSA-FAO Fellowship, PHILCUSA-FAO, 1953-1954
- Fellowship, Rockefeller Foundation, 1956-1959

He was awarded as the Most Distinguished Alumnus Award for 1988 from the University of the Philippines Los Baños and in 1994, he was proclaimed a National Scientist of the Philippines from the President of the Republic of the Philippines.
