= CEAT =

CEAT may refer to:

- CEAT (company), an Indian tire manufacturer
- University of the Philippines Los Baños College of Engineering and Agro-Industrial Technology
