= National Crop Protection Center =

Philippine research organization

Agency overview
- Formed: 1976
- Jurisdiction: Philippines
- Employees: 70
- Annual budget: ₱3 million
- Agency executive: Barbara Caoili, Director
- Website: ncpc.cafs.uplb.edu.ph

The National Crop Protection Center (NCPC) is a Philippine research and extension institution focused on crop protection and pest management. It is one of the research centers of the University of the Philippines Los Baños.

== Background ==
NCPC was established on May 19, 1976, through Presidential Decree No. 936 issued by President Ferdinand Marcos. It was mandated to conduct research, develop pest management systems, train manpower, and provide scientific advice to the government to reduce agricultural losses and help ensure a stable food supply. The center's founding director was entomologist Fernando Sanchez Sr.

The creation of NCPC expanded the mandate of the earlier Rodent Research Center, which had been established in 1968, into a broader institution addressing different aspects of crop protection.

During its establishment, the NCPC received funding and training assistance from the United States Agency for International Development (USAID) and the Ministry of Agriculture. This support helped establish Regional Crop Protection Centers and implement integrated pest management into the NCPC's programs.

NCPC collaborates with the Department of Agriculture on pest management and food security programs in the Philippines. It has also been involved in field assessments and management planning for major pest outbreaks such as armyworms, in coordination with local agricultural authorities.
