= University of the Philippines Los Baños College of Veterinary Medicine =

Veternary school in Laguna, Philippines

Coordinates: 14°09′30.17″N 121°14′33.69″E

College of Veterinary Medicine at University of the Philippines, Los Baños
- Type: College
- Established: 1908
- Dean: Dr. Maria Amelita C. Estacio
- Location: (Philippines) Los Baños, Laguna, Philippines
- Website: cvm.uplb.edu.ph

The College of Veterinary Medicine (CVM) is one of the 11 degree-granting units of the University of the Philippines at Los Baños. It is the country's first veterinary school.

Aside from teaching, CVM also undertakes research in various fields of veterinary medicine, including animal production and veterinary public health, and provides client-oriented veterinary services in urban and rural areas.

The college is composed of three departments - Basic Veterinary Sciences, Veterinary Paraclinical Sciences, and Veterinary Clinical Sciences. CVM has 93 personnel consisting of 38 faculty members, 48 administrative staff and 7 research and extension personnel. CVM is the only veterinary school in the country offering a Master of Science degree in Veterinary Medicine.

== History ==
As rinderpest ravaged the country at the turn of the century, the Board of Regents of the University of the Philippines decided to establish a College of Veterinary Science. The college was founded on 18 June 1908 through Republic Act No. 1870 by the Philippine Legislature. It was one of the original colleges of the University of the Philippines and was later renamed College of Veterinary Medicine.

With Dr. Archibald Ward as the first dean, the college held its first classes on 4 June 1910 with four students at the Animal Quarantine Station, Pandacan, Manila. The first batch of students graduated in the former four-year DVM program in 1914. The college has been relocated to five different places: San Lazaro, Manila (1912–1919); Los Baños, Laguna (1919–1933); back to Pandacan, Manila (1933–1949); Diliman, Quezon City (1949–1983) and finally to Los Baños, Laguna in 1983.

In 1976 the World Bank encouraged the Board of Regents to completely transfer the college from UP Diliman to UPLB. The Board complied, but decided to retain the Veterinary Teaching Hospital in Diliman.

== Research and Service Facilities ==
CVM-IAS Library

A joint facility of CVM with the Animal and Dairy Sciences Cluster (ADC) of the College of Agriculture, the library has the most extensive collection of veterinary and animal science materials in the country.

Dr. Jose A. Solis Veterinary Anatomy Exhibit Hall

The Dr. Jose A. Solis Veterinary Anatomy Exhibit Hall, or Anatomy Museum, was named after the late anatomist and former faculty Jose A. Solis. The exhibit hall contains preserved specimens of selected terrestrial and aquatic animals, particularly skeletons, abnormal embryos or fetuses, and normal microscopic structures of some organs.

Parasite Collection and Reference Center

Built in July 1995, the Center houses the college's collection of parasitic helminthes, arthropods, protozoa and a number of other invertebrates that serve as intermediate hosts of some of these parasites. It also displays collection on parasites of domestic and wild animals in the country. Likewise, it holds parasitological literature donated by National Scientist Carmen C. Velasquez and former dean Dr. Lope M. Yutuc, among others.

Biomedical Illustration and Microphotography Facility

This facility is located at the CVM Administration building and is available for microphotography and scientific drawing needs of the research faculty and undergraduate and graduate students.

Veterinary Teaching Hospital

The Veterinary Teaching Hospital (VTH) is composed of three sections located in two stations: Companion Animal Clinic (CAC) at Diliman Station, UP Diliman, and Small Animal Section (SAS) and Farm Animal Section (FAS) at Los Baños Station, UP Los Baños. The VTH offers veterinary medical and surgical services, as well as diagnostic laboratory and imaging (radiography, ultrasonography, and electrocardiography) services. The CAC also has a veterinary pharmacy for medical prescription, pet accessories and pet food needs; and a grooming center for pets.

The CAC (with 5 resident veterinarians) and SAS (with 2 resident veterinarians) cater to the needs of pet animals (mostly dogs and cats) brought in by clients. While the FAS (with 1 resident veterinarian) attend to farm animals. The FAS has three subsections: (1) the Farm Animal Clinic is the venue where farmers may ask for consultation regarding their farm animals; (2) Animal Disease Diagnostic Laboratory which takes care of the laboratory diagnostic procedures such as hematology, necropsy, bacterial isolation, water microbial analysis, blood parasite examination, antibiotic sensitivity test and the like; (3) Experimental Animal Farm attends to the resident animals - sheep, cattle, horses - of the CVM that are used for teaching and experiment purposes. It is in the latter subsection that animal pens for pigs, poultry and small ruminants belong. These pens are loaded with appropriate animals for experimental purposes by project leaders.

A Vaccinology and Virology Laboratory is found within the VTH building but is managed by the Department of Veterinary Paraclinical Sciences.

== Faculty ==
Department of Basic Veterinary Sciences

- Mary Jasmin Ang (DVM University of the Philippines Los Baños)
- Arrol Jan B. Aquino (DVM University of the Philippines Los Baños)
- Jussiaea Bariuan (DVM University of the Philippines Los Baños)
- Ariel M. Bombio (DVM University of the Philippines Los Baños)
- Bella C. Cruzana (PhD Gifu University)
- Joseph F. dela Cruz (PhD Hankyong National University)
- Maria Catalina T. De Luna (MAgric Nagoya University)
- Mark Joseph Desamero (PhD The University of Tokyo)
- Maria Amelita C. Estacio (DAgrSci Nagoya University)
- Joseph P. Olarve (MSc University of the Philippines Los Baños)
- Michelle Grace V. Paraso (PhD University of the Philippines Los Baños)
- Grace R. Sacnahon (DVM University of the Philippines Los Baños)

Affiliate Faculty:

- Ceferino P. Maala (PhD Cornell University) Professor Emeritus

Department of Veterinary Paraclinical Sciences

- Loinda R. Baldrias (PhD University of the Philippines Los Baños)
- Darwin R. Bandoy (DVM University of the Philippines Los Baños)
- Meriam Cautiver (DVM University of the Philippines Los Baños)
- Therese Marie A. Collantes (MSc Chonnam National University)
- Billy P. Divina (MSc Swedish University of Agricultural Sciences)
- Ronnie N. Domingo (MSc University of Edinburgh)
- Remil L. Galay (PhD Yamaguchi University)
- Ma. Suzanneth E. G. Lola (DVM University of the Philippines Los Baños)
- Benjamin Reuel G. Marte (MSc University of the Philippines Los Baños)
- Helen A. Molina (MVSt University of Melbourne)
- Mildred A. Padilla (DrPH University of the Philippines Manila)
- Gladys Pangga (DVM University of the Philippines Los Baños)
- Hope G. Rovira (PhD University of Minnesota)
- Romeo E. Sanchez, Jr. (PhD Ghent University)
- Emil Joseph S. Vergara (DVM University of the Philippines Los Baños)

Affiliate Faculty:

- Salcedo L. Eduardo (PhD University of London) Professor Emeritus
- Joseph S. Masangkay (DAgrSc Nagoya University) Professor Emeritus

Department of Veterinary Clinical Sciences

- Jovencio Hubert A. Abalos (MSc University of the Philippines Los Baños)
- Jezie A. Acorda (PhD Gifu University)
- Amadeo A. Alcantara (MSc University of the Philippines Los Baños)
- Francis Andrew Eugene M. Bernardo (MVSt University of Queensland)
- Jesalyn L. Constante (MSc University of the Philippines Los Baños)
- Rio John T. Ducusin (PhD Gifu University)
- Marianne Leila S. Flores (MHA University of the Philippines Open University)
- Karlo Romano B. Gicana (MSc University of the Philippines Los Baños)
- Emilia A. Lastica-Ternura (MSc University of the Philippines Los Baños)
- Veronica A. Matawaran (MSc Kansas State University)
- Rey B. Oronan (MSc University of the Philippines Los Baños)
- Arville Mar Gregorio A Pajas (MSc University of the Philippines Los Baños)
- Flor Marie Immanuelle R. Pilapil-Amante (MSc University of the Philippines Los Baños)
- Ma. Rosario S. Racho (DVM University of the Philippines Los Baños)
- Marco F. Reyes (MSc University of the Philippines Los Baños)
- Eduardo B. Torres (PhD Rakuno Gakuen University)
- Dennis V. Umali (PhD Yamaguchi University)

Affiliate Faculty:

- Jose Arceo N. Bautista (PhD Hokkaido University)
- Hiromitsu Katoh
- Ron Marco DL. Lameyra (DVM University of the Philippines Los Baños)
- Glenn S. Maguad
- Antonio A. Rayos (PhD Hokkaido University)
- Thelma A. Saludes (DVM University of the Philippines Los Baños)
- Leo Jonathan A. Suarez (DVM University of the Philippines Los Baños)
- Teodulo M. Topacio, Jr, PhD (PhD Cornell University) Professor Emeritus
- Maria Theresa Q. Ursal (DVM University of the Philippines Los Baños)
- Conrado A. Valdez (PhD Hokkaido University)

== Degree Programs ==
- Doctor of Veterinary Medicine (six-year program)
- MS Veterinary Medicine
  Majors: Veterinary Anatomy, Veterinary Internal Medicine, Veterinary Microbiology, Veterinary Parasitology, Veterinary Pathology, Veterinary Physiology, Veterinary Public Health, Veterinary Surgery, Theriogenology
- Master in Veterinary Epidemiology

== Academic Organizations ==
- U.P. Alpha Chiron Society (UPACS)
- U.P. Lady Veterinary Students' Association (UP Lady Vets)
- U.P. Rodeo Club Philippines (RCP)
- U.P. Societas Mulierum (SM)
- U.P. Society for the Advancement of Veterinary Education and Research (SAVER)
- U.P. Society of Men (SM)
- U.P. Venerable Knight Veterinarians Fraternity (VKV)
- U.P. Venerable Lady Veterinarians Sorority (VLV)
- U.P. Veterinary Medical Students' Society (VetSoc)
- U.P. CVM Clinicians' Club (UP CVM CC)
