= Tish Pascual-Ladlad =

Filipino student journalist and martyr

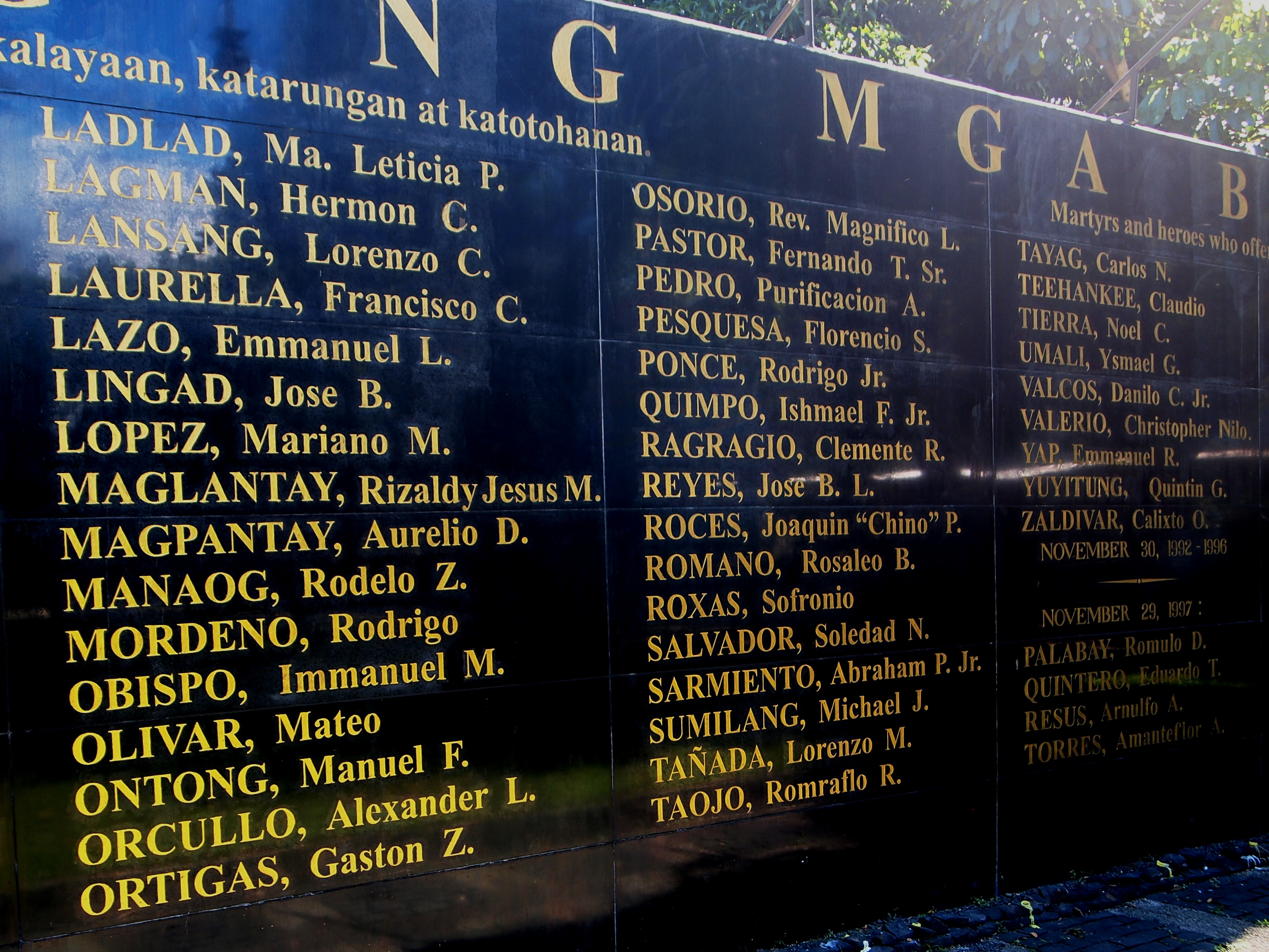
- Detail of the Wall of Remembrance at the Bantayog ng mga Bayani, showing names from the first batch of Bantayog Honorees, including that of Tish Pascual-Ladlad
- Born: Maria Leticia Quintina Jimenez Pascual; August 30, 1950; Tacloban, Leyte, Philippines
- Disappeared: November 1, 1975 (aged 25); Paco, Manila, Philippines
- Education: University of the Philippines Los Baños (no degree)
- Occupations: Student journalist, activist
- Awards: Honored at the Bantayog ng mga Bayani wall of remembrance

Maria Leticia Quintina Jimenez Pascual-Ladlad (August 30, 1950 – disappeared November 1, 1975), also known by her nickname Tish, was a student journalist at the University of the Philippines Los Baños (UPLB) during the Marcos dictatorship, known for being the first woman editor-in-chief of the Aggie Green and Gold, for her community organizing work among farmers in Laguna and Quezon, and for being the first UPLB student to become a desaparecido during the Martial Law regime.

She is honored as a martyr of the Philippines' Martial Law era, having had her name etched on the wall of remembrance at the Philippines' Bantayog ng mga Bayani. In UPLB, she is honored at the campus' Hagdan ng Malayang Kamalayan memorial.

== See also ==
- List of people who disappeared mysteriously: post-1970
- Extrajudicial killings and forced disappearances in the Philippines
