= University of the Philippines Los Baños College of Engineering and Agro-Industrial Technology =

Coordinates: 14°09′41″N 121°14′51″E

- Type: Constituent college
- Established: 1912 (department); 1983 (college)
- Dean: Dr. Rex B. Demafelis
- Location: Los Baños, Laguna, Philippines
- Website: http://ceat.uplb.edu.ph/

The College of Engineering and Agro-Industrial Technology (also known as CEAT) is one of the eleven degree-granting units of the University of the Philippines Los Baños. It began as the Department of Agricultural Engineering under the College of Agriculture in 1912. It was then elevated into the Institute of Agricultural Engineering and Technology in 1976 and eventually became a full-fledged college in 1983.

== Academic Units ==
=== Institute of Agricultural Engineering ===
The Institute of Agricultural Engineering offers undergraduate and graduate programs leading to the degree of Agricultural and Biosystems Engineering. The institute was established on April 17, 1997 during the 1107th Meeting of the UP Board of Regents. It is composed of four academic divisions. The academic divisions include the Agricultural and Bio-Processing Division, the Agricultural Machinery Division, the Agrometeorology and Farm Structures Division, and the Land and Water Resources Division.

The institute offers the following courses:

- Bachelor of Science in Agricultural and Biosystems Engineering with majors in agricultural and bio-process engineering, agrometeorology and farm structures, agricultural power and machinery engineering, and land and water resources engineering
- Master of Science in Agricultural Engineering with majors in agricultural and bio-process Engineering, agricultural power and machinery engineering, and land and water resources engineering
- Master of Science in Agrometeorology
- Doctor of Philosophy in agricultural engineering with majors in Agricultural and Bio-process Engineering, Agricultural Power and Machinery Engineering, and Land and Water Resources Engineering

=== Department of Civil Engineering ===
The Department of Civil Engineering offers undergraduate programs leading to the degree of civil engineering. The department traces its roots back to 1991 when the 5-year curricular program in Civil Engineering was proposed. By 1992, the department was formally established and began offering the degree program. The department currently has three PhD graduates, three master's degree holders and five instructors as members.

The department offers the following course:

- Bachelor of Science in Civil Engineering

=== Department of Chemical Engineering ===
The Department of Chemical Engineering offers undergraduate programs leading to the degree in chemical engineering. The department started from the UP College of Agriculture Sugar Technology Program in 1968. During the booming years of the Philippine Sugar industry in 1920, The UPCA (now UPLB College of Agriculture and Food Science) offered a degree program in sugar technology aiming to train students in the cane production, sugar chemistry and sugar factory operations. With recent developments after the World War II, the sugar technology program was integrated along with math and sciences courses that now comprise the current curriculum of the chemical engineering program.

The department offers the following courses:

- Bachelor of Science in chemical Engineering with majors in sugar technology and in pulp and paper technology.
- Master of Science in chemical Engineering

=== Department of Electrical Engineering ===
The Department of Electrical Engineering offers undergraduate programs leading to the degree of electrical engineering. The department was approved by the UP Board of Regents on September 26, 1996 and is located at the New Electrical Engineering Building along Pili Drive.

The department offers the following course:

- Bachelor of Science in electrical engineering with majors in power engineering, electronics engineering and computer engineering.

=== Department of Engineering Science ===
The Department of Engineering Science is the multidisciplinary department of the College of Engineering and Agro-Industrial Technology. It was established on February 23, 1983 upon the elevation of CEAT into a full-fledged college. The department is responsible for handling the basic engineering courses in the college and serves as the starting point for new engineering departments.

=== Department of Industrial Engineering ===
The Department of Industrial Engineering offers undergraduate programs leading to the degree of industrial engineering. The department started in 1999 by offering the degree program by the first semester of 1999-2000 with 8 shiftees as its pioneer students. The department is located along Pili Drive and is housed in the new Industrial Engineering Building.

The department offers the following course:

- Bachelor of Science in Industrial Engineering

== Research ==
Aside from teaching, CEAT also pursues research in collaboration with government and non-government organizations, the private sector, and international organizations. CEAT likewise implements extension projects for the benefit of engineering stakeholders.

The college is notable for spearheading the Philippines' National Biofuels Program in partnership with the National Institute of Molecular Biology and Biotechnology. The program includes research and develop programs on the production of biodiesel from Jatropha curcas and bioethanol from cassava and sweet sorghum. The research aims in producing high quality biodiesel and bioethanol and generating income for local farmers.
