= University of the Philippines Los Baños College of Human Ecology =

Degree-granting unit of university

Coordinates: 14°09′54.83″N 121°14′31.93″E

College of Human Ecology at University of the Philippines Los Baños
- Established: 1974
- Dean: Raden G. Piadozo
- Location: Los Baños, Laguna, Philippines
- Website: uplb.edu.ph/index.php/che

The College of Human Ecology is one of the eleven degree-granting units of the University of the Philippines at Los Baños. It is one of only a few institutions in Asia that offers a degree program in Human Ecology and is the first and only one to offer the degree in the Philippines. It is also the first in Asia to offer a degree program in Food and Nutrition Planning.

CHE aims to develop "professionals who understand human development in relation to the biophysical and social environment, are able to participate in development programs, internalize and apply the ecological perspective to society’s problems; as well as produce human resource who understand nutrition management, and nutrition program planning, implementation, and evaluation."

== History ==
CHE is one of the few human ecology degree programs offered in Asia. In 1974, the Institute of Human Ecology (IHE) in UPLB was established in response to the call of Stockholm Conference for a “common outlook and principle to inspire and guide the people and the world in preservation and enhancement of human environment. It then became College of Human Ecology by 1983.

== Research and Extension ==
The College developed and currently administers the Regional Training Program on Food and Nutrition Planning for the United Nations Food and Agriculture Organization and the Netherlands Universities Foundation for International Cooperation. It aims to establish a pool of human resources in Asia who are fully capable of integrating nutrition considerations into development planning and management. It is the first in Asia to offer a degree program on Food and Nutrition Planning which has trained hundreds from all over the continent since its inception in 1978.

== Degree Programs ==
- PhD Nutrition
- MS Family Resource Management
- MPS Food and Nutrition Planning
- MS Applied Nutrition
- BS Human Ecology (Majors: Human Settlement Planning; Social Technology; Family Development)
- BS Nutrition
