= University of the Philippines Los Baños Institute of Plant Breeding =

Research institute of the University of the Philippines Los Baños

Coordinates: 14°09′13.51″N 121°15′42.52″E

- University of the Philippines Los Baños; Institute of Plant Breeding
- Type: Research Institute
- Established: 1975
- Director: Jose E. Hernandez
- Location: Los Baños, Laguna, Philippines
- Website: community.uplb.edu.ph/ca/ipb
- Location in Laguna University of the Philippines Los Baños Institute of Plant Breeding (Luzon) University of the Philippines Los Baños Institute of Plant Breeding (Philippines)

The Institute of Plant Breeding (IPB) is a research institute of the University of the Philippines Los Baños. It is the national biotechnology research center and repository for all crops other than rice, which is handled by the Philippine Rice Research Institute.

It traces its roots to the Plant Breeding Division of the Department of Agronomy, College of Agriculture. Dr. Emil Q. Javier later spearheaded the elevation of the division to an institute, which was approved and given funding under Presidential Decree No. 729 in June 1975, with Javier also serving as the institute's first director.

== Core functions ==
- Develop new and improved varieties of dryland crops
- Conduct studies in plant breeding and allied disciplines related to crop improvement
- Collect, introduce, preserve, and maintain germplasm of important and potentially useful agricultural and horticultural crops
- Assist other agencies in multiplying quality seeds and vegetative materials of recommended crop varieties
- Promote widescale use of IPB varieties and ensure that seeds are made available to small farmers

== Divisions and laboratories ==
- Cereal Crops Division
- Feed and Industrial Crops Division
- Fruit and Ornamental Crops Division
- Legume Crops Division
- Vegetables and Special Crops Division
- Plant Pathology Laboratory
- Entomology Laboratory
- Plant Physiology Laboratory
- Extension Division
- Genetics Laboratory
- National Plant Genetic Resources Laboratory
- Biochemistry Laboratory
- Plant Cell and Tissue Culture Laboratory
- National Seed Foundation

== Samples of IPB research ==
- Papaya Ringspot Virus (PSRV)-Resistant

This variety is a genetically enhanced papaya with PRSV resistance and delayed ripening trait. This trait will help reduce post-harvest losses due to spoilage which is another major problem to farmers. The first and second generation papayas had been previously subjected to polymerase chain reaction analysis, which indicated that the lines contain a copy of the PRSV coat protein gene. A third generation papaya is currently under development.

- Fruit and Shoot Borer Resistant Eggplant

Initial crosses had already been made between Indian transgenic eggplants and selected Philippine varieties Mara, Mistisa, Dumaguete Long Purple, and Casino. The progeny of these crosses were then back-crossed with their Philippine variety parent in India.

- Multiple Virus Resistant Tomato

The multiple virus resistant project aims to combine transgenic technologies for Cucumber Mosaic Virus with conventional resistance against Tomato Leaf Curl Virus (ToLCV) to produce commercial tomato varieties. After introgression lines and appropriate controls were supplied by IPB partners, these tomato lines were screened to identify the genome regions that confer resistance against each local ToLCV. Reliable DNA markers are also being developed for each identified genome (introgression) region.

- Mutation Breeding of Philippine Avocado

Although engaged in genetic engineering, the institute also uses mutation breeding, which is an alternative method of improving crop varieties. Small portions of avocado plant tissue (embryos) were allowed to grow (embryogenic cultures) and to differentiate into somatic embryos and shoots. Some of the plant tissue cultures were subjected to gamma irradiation to facilitate mutation from the regenerated plant tissue cultures. During the irradiation, some cells were killed and those capable of regrowth were multiplied. The surviving cells were grown to produce somatic embryos and shoots. The shoots from irradiated and non-irradiated tissues were then treated in a test tube environment to promote root growth and prepare them for natural growth environment. The IPB is currently undertaking the rooting and potting out of the plantlets to enable maximum recovery. The established regenerated plants will then be transferred to the greenhouse, and finally to the field for further evaluation.
