= Emil Q. Javier =

Filipino plant geneticist and agronomist

Emil Q. Javier ONS
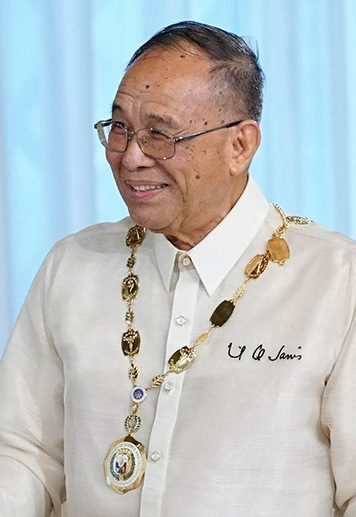
- Javier in 2020

17th President of the University of the Philippines
- In office 1993–1999
- Preceded by: José Abueva
- Succeeded by: Francisco Nemenzo Jr.

Director General of the National Science Development Board
- In office 1981–1986
- President: Ferdinand Marcos
- Preceded by: Melencio S. Magno (as NSDB Chairman)
- Succeeded by: Antonio V. Arizabal (as DOST Secretary)

4th Director of the Southeast Asian Regional Center for Graduate Study and Research in Agriculture
- In office 1983–1984
- Preceded by: Joseph C. Madamba
- Succeeded by: Fernando A. Bernardo

2nd Chancellor of University of the Philippines Los Baños
- In office 1979–1985
- Preceded by: Abelardo G. Samonte
- Succeeded by: Raul P. De Guzman

Personal details
- Born: September 11, 1940 (age 86) Santa Cruz, Laguna, Philippines
- Education: University of the Philippines Los Baños; University of Illinois, Urbana-Champaign; Cornell University
- Occupation: University administrator, educator, agronomist
- Awards: Order of National Scientists of the Philippines (2019)
- Nickname: EQJ

Emil Q. Javier (born September 11, 1940) is a Filipino plant geneticist and agronomist best known for having served as the 17th President of the University of the Philippines between 1993 and 1999. He was conferred the rank of National Scientist of the Philippines for contributions in Agriculture in August 2019.

== Early life and education ==
Javier was born in Santa Cruz, Laguna, Philippines. He earned his Ph.D. in Plant Breeding and Genetics from Cornell University, his master's degree from the University of Illinois at Urbana–Champaign and bachelor's degree from the University of the Philippines College of Agriculture (now the University of the Philippines Los Baños).

== Career ==
Javier spearheaded the elevation the UPCA's Division of Plant Breeding into the UPLB Institute of Plant Breeding, which was approved and given funding under Presidential Decree No. 729 in June 1975, with Javier also serving as the institute's first director.

During his tenure as Chancellor of the UP Los Baños, Javier initiated the issuance of Executive Order No. 889 in 1983, which led to the establishment of the National Centers of Excellence in the Basic Sciences. The order designated several units within the University of the Philippines System as national centers, including the National Institute of Physics, the National Institute of Geological Sciences, and the Natural Sciences Research Institute at the UP Diliman, as well as the Institute of Mathematical Sciences, the Institute of Chemistry, and the Institute of Biological Sciences at the UP Los Baños.

Javier later served as President of the University of the Philippines System from 1993 to 1999. His administration oversaw the creation of the UP Open University and UP Mindanao, as well as the formal institutionalization of the Ugnayan ng Pahinungod volunteer service program. He likewise advanced the university's biotechnology efforts by consolidating them into the National Institutes of Molecular Biology and Biotechnology (NIMBB), a multi-campus network spanning major UP constituent universities.

Javier served as a presidential cabinet member and chair of the National Science Development Board. He worked at The Hague in the Netherlands as senior research fellow for the International Service for National Agricultural Research and went to Taiwan to direct work on vegetable research and development. After a few years abroad, Javier returned to his country at the request of former President Fidel V. Ramos to lead the University of the Philippines as its president.

== Awards and honors ==
- 2020 Asian Scientist 100, Asian Scientist
