= University of the Philippines Los Baños School of Environmental Science and Management =

Unit of the University of Philippines

Coordinates: 14°09′58.60″N 121°14′29.56″E

School of Environmental Science and Management at University of the Philippines, Los Baños
- Established: 1977
- Dean: Dr. Rico C. Ancog
- Location: Los Baños, Laguna, Philippines
- Website: http://uplb.edu.ph/index.php/sesam

The School of Environmental Science and Management (SESAM) is one of the eleven degree-granting units of the University of the Philippines at Los Baños (UPLB). It was created in 1977 in response to calls for a multidisciplinary effort to address environmental degradation amid economic development. Then known as the Program on Environmental Science and Management, it was lodged under the Office of the Chancellor with initial funding support from the Ford Foundation.

It began offering the Master of Environmental Studies program in 1984 and pioneered development and testing methodologies and approaches for sustainable management of upland resources, which include the following: Agroecosystem analysis, Rapid Rural Systems Appraisal (RRSA), Assisted Natural Regeneration (ANR), Strategic Environmental Planning and Modelling and environmental impact assessment.

== Degree Programs ==
- PhD Environmental Science
- MS Environmental Science
- PhD Environmental Diplomacy and Negotiations
