= National Institute of Molecular Biology and Biotechnology =

Research institute of the University of the Philippines

Coordinates: 14°39′9″N 121°3′46″E

- University of the Philippines; National Institute of Molecular Biology and Biotechnology
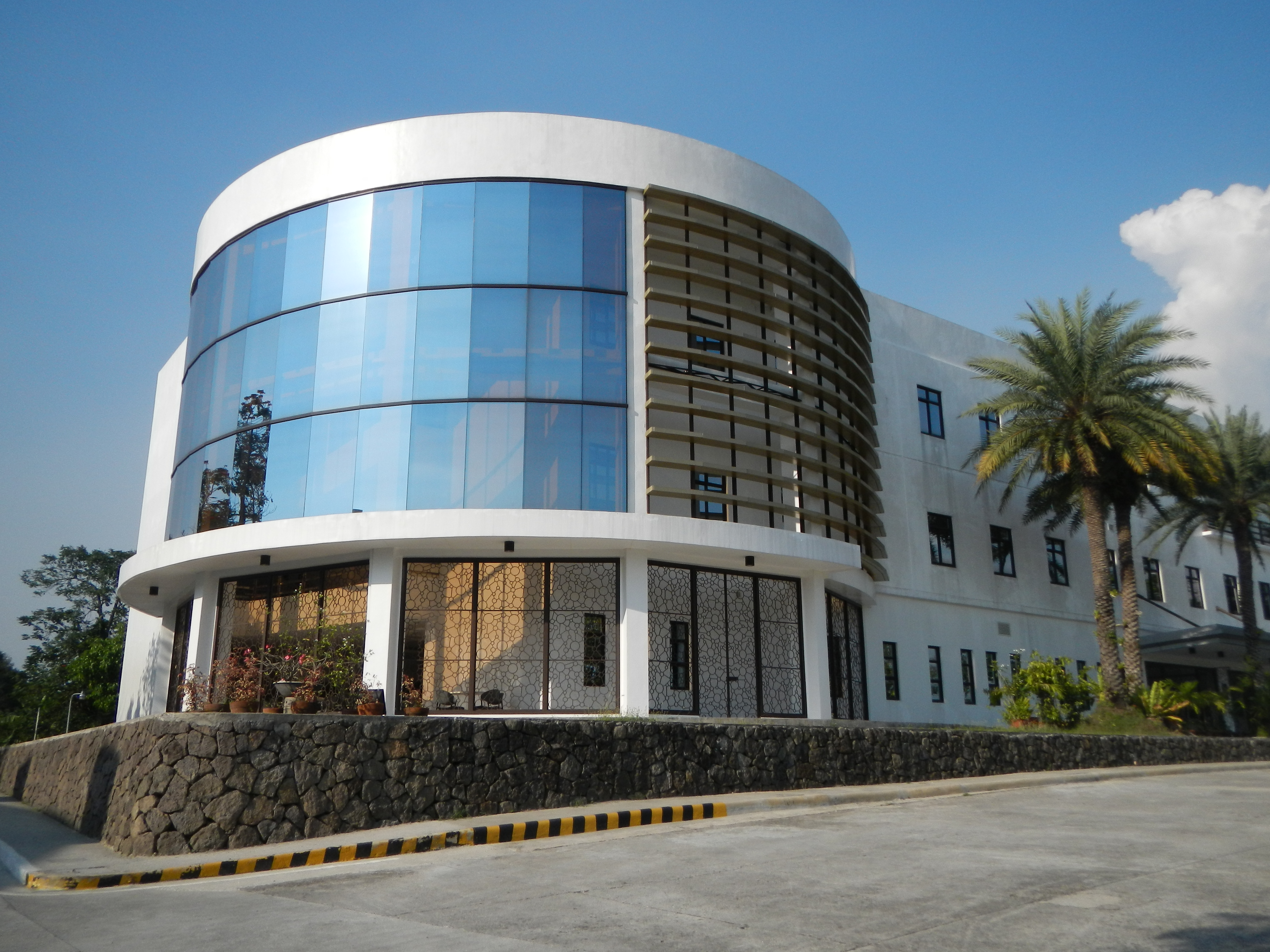
- NIMBB Building at UP Diliman campus
- Type: Research Institute
- Established: 1979
- Director: Marilyn Brown, Ph.D. (Los Baños); Pia Bagamasbad, Ph.D. (Diliman)
- Location: Los Baños, Laguna, Philippines (headquarters)
- Website: biotech.uplb.edu.ph nimbb.upd.edu.ph

The National Institute of Molecular Biology and Biotechnology, also known as NIMBB, is a research institute of the University of the Philippines (UP). It has four branches distributed across various UP campuses, namely: UP Diliman (NIMBB-Diliman), UP Los Baños (BIOTECH-UPLB), UP Manila (National Institutes of Health-IMBB/BIOTECH-UP Manila) and UP Visayas (NIMBB-UP Visayas/BIOTECH-UP Visayas).

BIOTECH laboratories are accredited and recognized by Environmental Management Bureau, Department of Environment and Natural Resources, Food and Drug Administration, Department of Health, and Bureau of Animal Industry.

== Research and Extension Programs ==
Research and Extension at BIOTECH covers five main areas:

=== Biotechnology for Agriculture and Forest Program ===
The Biotechnology for Agriculture and Forestry Program is the country's center of agribiotechnology researches on biofertilizers, microbial biodiversity for reforestation and agricultural waste treatment.

=== Biotechnology Program for Food, Feeds and Specialty Products ===
Headquarters of the National Institute of Molecular Biology and Biotechnology in Los Baños, Laguna

BIOTECH discovers and upgrades technologies to produce high value foods, feeds, additives, specialty products, and develops efficient detection kits to ensure quality and safety. The program explores sources, properties and application of functional foods such as nutraceuticals, probiotics from GRAS Lactic Acid Bacteria and yeast.

Nutraceuticals are the functional foods such as omega-3, 6 and polyunsaturated fatty acids from structured lipids like coconut and local seed oil. The institute also intensifies improvement, application and commercialization of existing DNA-based detection kits and industrial enzymes.

=== Natural Products ===
Biotechnology for Natural Products Program applies modern and conventional scientific techniques to discover pharmaceutically-important compounds produced from local isolates and to develop plant cell culture systems as a source of high-value secondary metabolites (drugs). The program uses bioinformatics, computational software, and tissue culture technology for the identification and mass production of identified novel compounds. Continuing efforts are exerted to promote and commercialize BioVac-HS and BioVac-FC, the vaccines against Pasteurella multocida which causes fatal hemorrhagic septicemia and fowl cholera, respectively.

=== Biotechnology for Industrial and Environmental and Energy Program ===
Industrial and Environmental Biotechnology searches for cost-effective and renewable fuel sources to help lessen the impact of oil price increases. The program focuses on the discovery and development of robust microorganisms to improve biofuel production. It also develops biological binders or biosurfactant, biopolymers, and heat-resistant enzymes, for wastes degradation and bioremediation.

=== Technology Transfer/Training and Business Development ===
Technology Transfer/Training and Business Development Program packages BIOTECH information and facilitates its proactive exchange among the scientists-researchers and Institute clients. The program also embarks on various technology transfer and commercialization approaches. Among its services include biotechnology promotion, training and internship, product and technology marketing, database management and communication support services.

== Facilities and Services ==
=== Philippine National Collection of Microorganisms (PNCM) ===
The PNCM is a repository of microorganisms containing over 2000 strains of bacteria, yeasts, filamentous fungi, algae and protozoa. It is the biggest laboratory of its kind in the country.

It is a member of the World Federation of Culture Collections and serves as the headquarters of the Philippine Network of Microbial Culture Collections. PNCM has active linkages with culture collection laboratories here and abroad.

=== Central Analytical Services Laboratory (CASL) ===
CASL handles routine chemical analysis of food, feeds, plants, soils, fertilizers, water, wastewater, raw materials, by-products of fermentation processes, and even cosmetics. It modifies and standardizes analytical methods for applications to specific samples, as well as develops new analytical techniques.

The laboratory implements and maintains a high quality system based on ISO 17025 guidelines for laboratory competence. CASL is accredited/recognized by the Environmental Management Bureau, Department of Environment and Natural Resources, Bureau of Food and Drugs, Department of Health, and Bureau of Animal Industry.

=== Electron Microscopy Service Laboratory (EMSL) ===
The EMSL contains transmission and scanning electron microscopes. This laboratory provides structure analysis of biological and non-biological samples by light photomicroscopy and the ultra-structure analysis of samples by scanning and transmission electron microscopy.

=== Enzyme Laboratory (EL) ===
The EL offers services to determine the different enzyme activities or samples for food, feeds and other industrial applications. Enzyme assay indicates the effectiveness of a given enzyme to a specific substrate and serves as a quality control tool.

It also accepts contract researches on the production and application of industrial enzymes.

=== Fermentation Engineering and Service Laboratory (FESL) ===
The FESL provides technical support for optimizing upstream process parameters through R&D collaboration, as well as optimizing product recovery and downstream process parameters.

=== National Immunological Testing Laboratory (NITL) ===
The NITL is the diagnostic center for the rapid detection of mycotoxins and plant, food, and feed pathogens. The laboratory can determine the concentrations of the mycotoxins, aflatoxin B1 and M1, ochratoxin A, zearalenone, fumonisin and red tide toxins to as low as 5 ppb.

== Images ==
UP Diliman

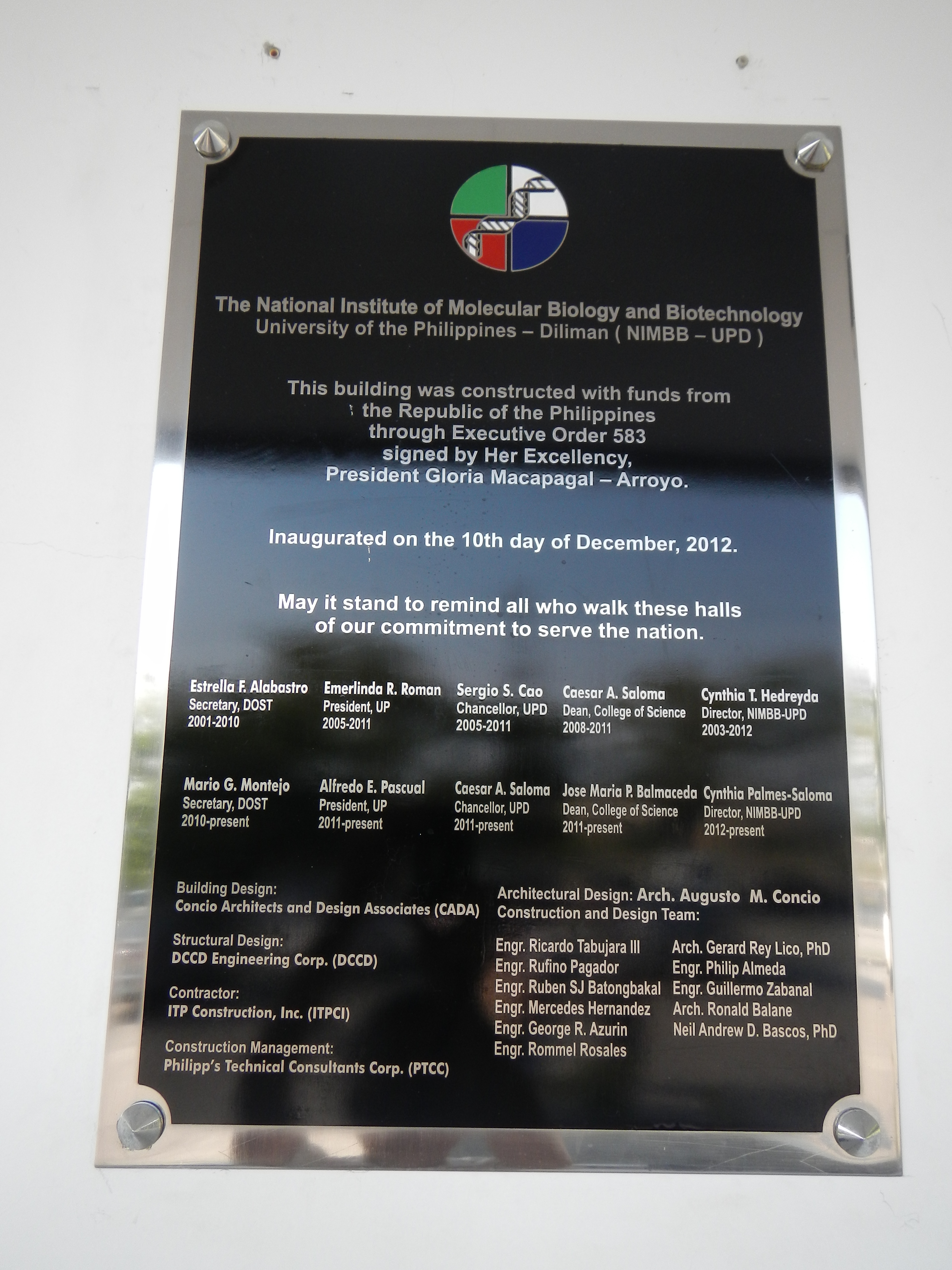
Historical marker

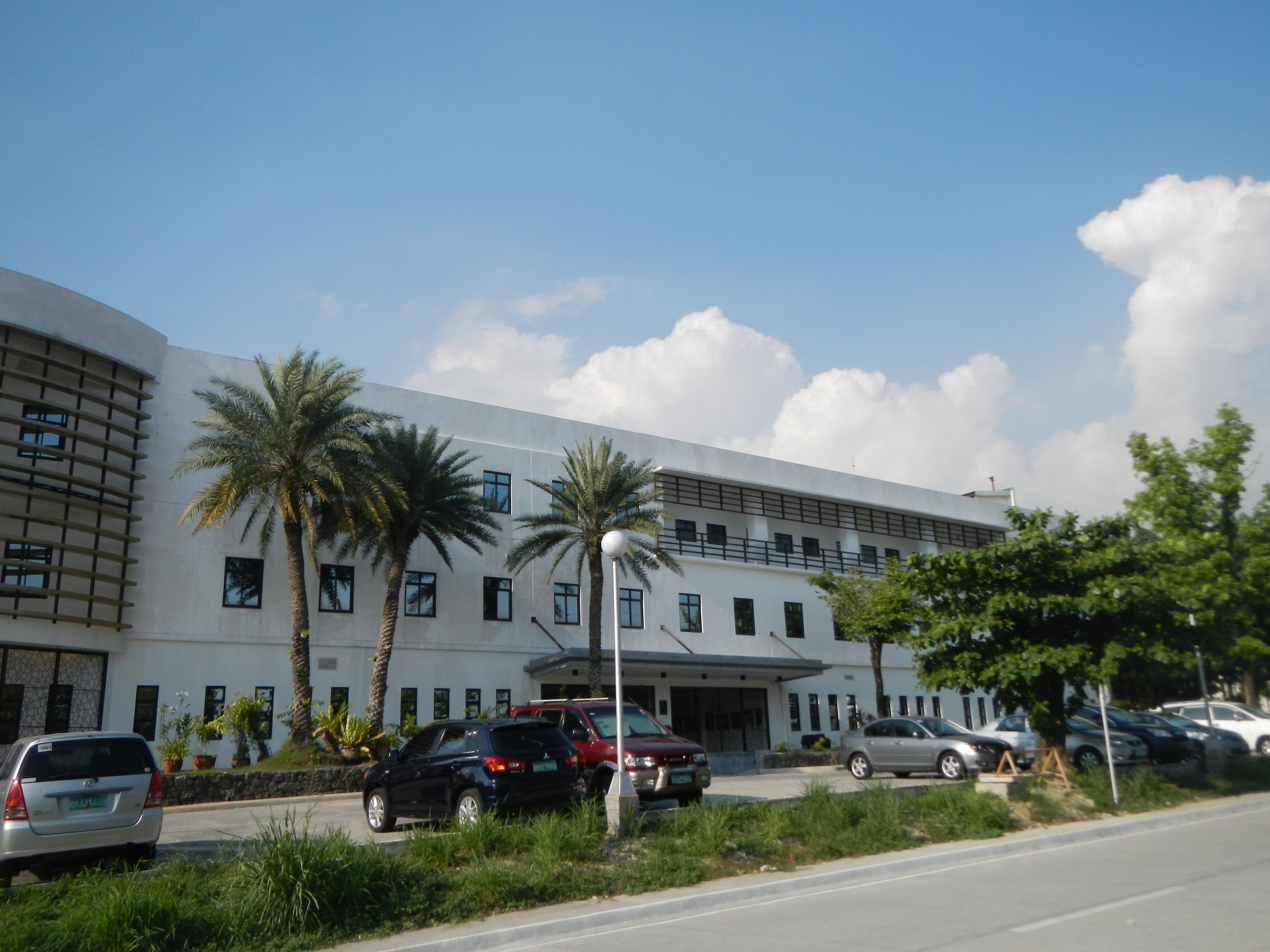
Facade

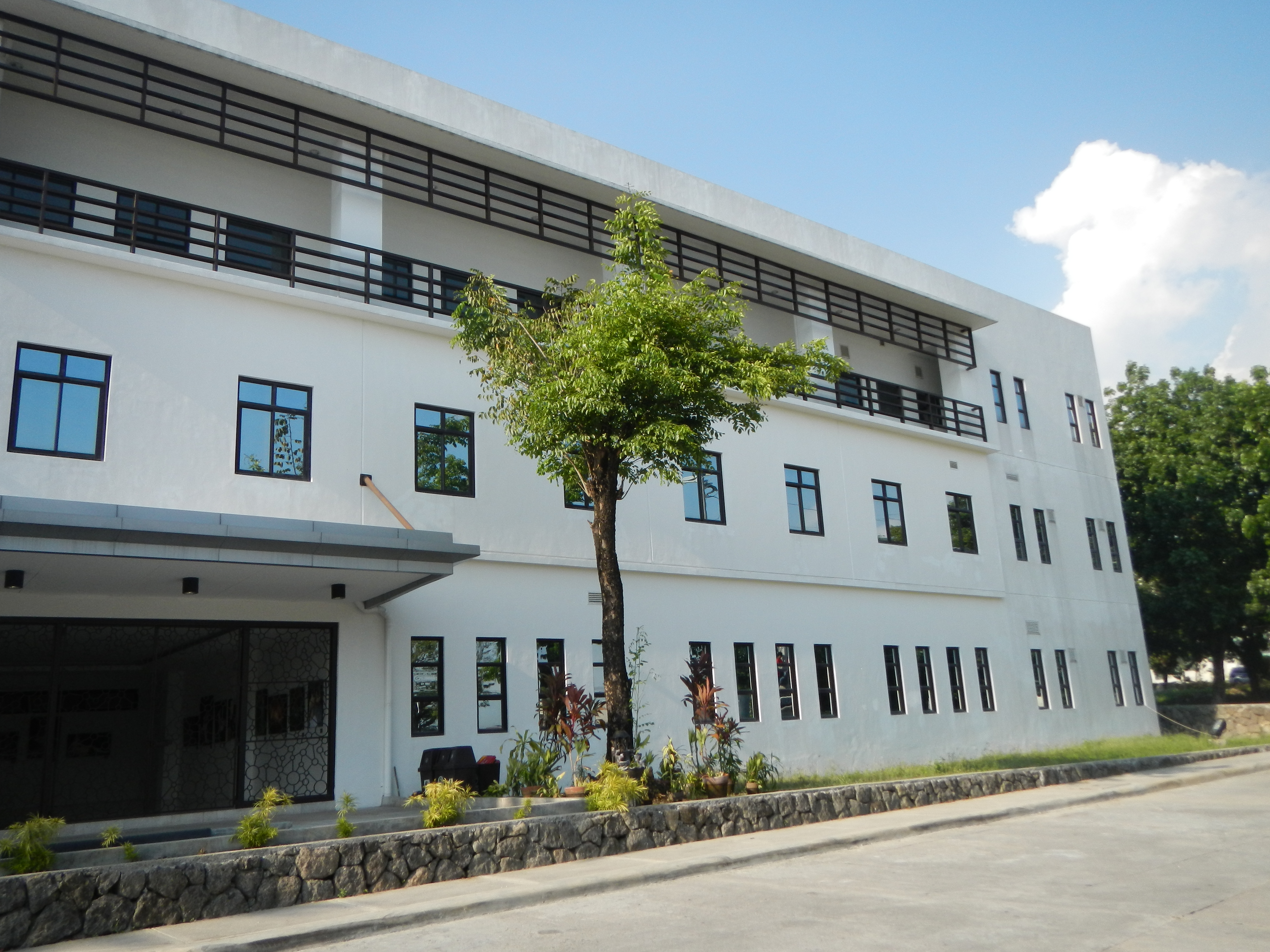
Right facade
