= Southeast Asian Regional Center for Graduate Study and Research in Agriculture =

Non-profit inter-government treaty organization in Southeast Asia

Coordinates: 14°09′54″N 121°14′25″E

- Abbreviation: SEARCA
- Formation: 27 November 1966
- Type: Non-profit inter-government treaty organization
- Headquarters: Los Baños, Laguna, Philippines
- Region served: Southeast Asia
- Affiliations: Southeast Asian Minister of Education Organization (SEAMEO)
- Website: www.searca.org

SEARCA or the Southeast Asian Regional Center for Graduate Study and Research in Agriculture is one of the oldest among 26 specialist institutions of the Southeast Asian Ministers of Education Organization (SEAMEO), hosted by the Philippine government at the University of the Philippines Los Baños, founded on 27 November 1966.

SEARCA aligns its initiatives with SEAMEO's directive, serving its 11 member countries: Brunei Darussalam, Cambodia, Indonesia, Lao PDR, Malaysia, Myanmar, the Philippines, Singapore, Thailand, Timor-Leste, and Vietnam. Beyond Southeast Asia, SEARCA also engages with SEAMEO's associate member countries, namely Australia, Canada, France, Germany, Morocco, the Netherlands, New Zealand, Spain, and the United Kingdom.

SEARCA is currently headed by Dr. Mercedita Sombilla, Center Director, with Dr. Rico Ancog as Deputy Director for Administration.

== Historical milestones ==
Timeline	Milestone
November 1965	A historic meeting of education ministers of Thailand, Lao PDR, Malaysia, Philippines, Singapore, and Vietnam, and United States government representative paved the way for an interim Southeast Asian Ministers of Education Secretariat (SEAMES) to be formed to draw up priority projects for the region, including instituting a center for graduate study and research in agriculture.
July 1966	At the SEAMES Technical Workshop held in Kuala Lumpur, Malaysia, the Philippine delegation submitted the position paper that a task force evaluated and for which it recommend a framework for operation.
November 1966	The Second Conference of SEAMES held in Manila, Philippines witnessed how the Philippine delegation led by Dr. Dioscoro L. Umali, Dr. Gil F. Saguiguit, and Mr. Onofre D. Corpuz crafted a proposal for grafting the proposed institute to then University of the Philippines College of Agriculture (UPCA) where it will be hosted. The proposal was approved and the institute was officially named the "Southeast Asian Regional Center for Graduate Study and Research in Agriculture (SEARCA)."
1 July 1967-June 1969	SEARCA operated on an interim status during which guidelines for its establishment were firmed up. Dr. Umali served as Director and Dr. Saguiguit as Assistant Director.
July 1969	SEARCA's permanent existence began, made possible by the Letter of Agreement regarding its establishment, operations and funding for a five-year period signed by the SEARCA Director, SEAMES Acting Director, the Philippine Education Secretary representing the host government, and a representative of the United States government, which was the principal donor of funds during the interim period and the first five years of SEARCA's permanent existence.
1969-1979	Since 1969, SEARCA has evolved and operated under the guidance of Five-Year Plans (FYPs), each embodying an overall strategic theme that SEARCA operationalized through its core programs. During the First and Second FYPs (1969-1974 and 1974-1979), SEARCA's priority thrust was the generation and transfer of productivity-enhancing agricultural technologies, reflecting the Center's desire to take advantage of the newly developed high-yielding varieties at that time (called “Green Revolution”).
1979-1984	In its Third FYP, SEARCA shifted its strategic thrust to the management of the sub-systems that constitute the agricultural system, including the Development and Management of Irrigation Systems, Research Systems, Extension Systems, Post-Production Systems, and Farming Systems.
1984-1989	Agricultural and Rural Development was the overall theme of the Fourth FYP, principally through technology generation, verification, packaging, dissemination, and utilization.
1989-1994	SEARCA's Fifth FYP focused on the theme of Evaluation and Testing of Agricultural Development Technologies and Models, with the goal of customizing them to the needs and conditions of the SEAMEO member countries.
1994-1999	In the Sixth FYP, SEARCA intensified its thrust in Developing and Testing Methodologies and Approaches to the broad and complex area of Agricultural Development. Its major R & D projects included the Development of Upland Communities, Agro-industrialization, Gender and Development, Management of Agricultural Information, Coastal Area Agriculture, and Bio-fertilizer Research.
1999-2004	In cadence with the changing conditions of the Southeast Asian region, the strategic theme of SEARCA's Seventh FYP shifted to Natural Resource Management (NRM) and Agro-Industrial Development. The sub-themes of the Seventh FYP included Food Security, Biotechnology, Water Resource Management, Biodiversity Conservation, Climate Change, and Environmental Risk Management.
2004-2014	The Eight and Ninth FYPs (2004/2009 and 2009/2014) of the Center adopted basically similar strategic themes: Natural Resource Management (NRM) and Agricultural Competitiveness. NRM projects implemented were in the areas of Sustainable Land Use and Water Management, Climate Change and Risk Management, and Biodiversity Conservation, while Agricultural Competitiveness projects covered Trade and Investment, Technology Management, Governance, Institutional Reforms, and Policy Studies.
2014-2020	SEARCA's 10th FYP had the overarching theme of Inclusive and Sustainable Agricultural and Rural Development (ISARD). Its core programs on Graduate Education and Institutional Development, Research and Development, and Knowledge Management were anchored on strategic thrusts that promoted Social Inclusion, Environmental Sustainability, and Cross-cutting Concerns.
2020-2025	SEARCA launched its 11th FYP: Accelerating Transformation Through Agricultural Innovation (ATTAIN). SEARCA’s transformation efforts focused on seven priority areas: Agri-Business Models for Increased Productivity and Income; Sustainable Farming Systems and Natural Resource Management; Food and Nutrition Security; Transformational Leadership for Agricultural and Rural Development (ARD); Gender and Youth Engagement in ARD; Enhanced ARD towards Climate Resilience; and EcoHealth/One Health Applications to ARD.

== The 12th Five-Year Development Plan (2025/2026–2029/2030) ==
SEARCA's latest strategic direction is articulated in its 12th Five-Year Development Plan (FYDP), which introduces a new thematic banner: "Sustainable Transformation of Agricultural Systems through Innovation in Southeast Asia" (SUSTAIN Southeast Asia).
