= Oblation (statue) =

Historic colossal statue in the Philippines

Coordinates: 14°39′17″N 121°3′53″E

- Original statue, now located within the Main Library (Gonzalez Hall) of the University of the Philippines Diliman
- Artist: Guillermo Tolentino
- Year: 30 November 1935
- Medium: Concrete cast
- Dimensions: 267.9 cm × 500.3 cm × 321.3 cm (8.79 ft × 16.41 ft × 10.54 ft)
- Location: Gonzalez Hall, University of the Philippines Diliman, Quezon City, Philippines

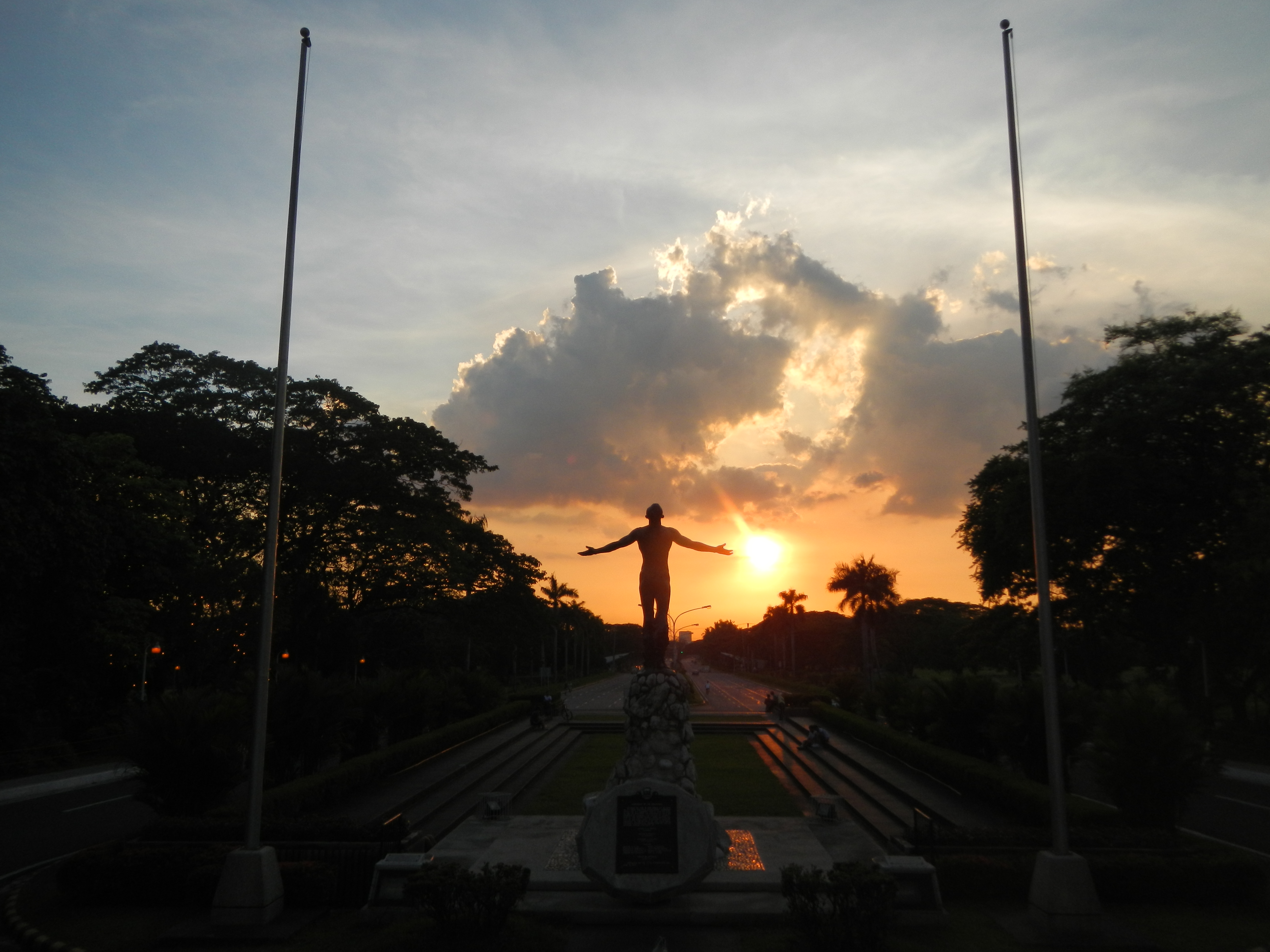
The Oblation statue in UP Diliman Oblation Plaza

The Oblation (Filipino: Pahinungod, Oblasyon) is a concrete cast statue by Philippine National Artist Guillermo Tolentino that serves as one of the symbols of the University of the Philippines. It depicts a man facing upward with arms outstretched, symbolizing a selfless offering of oneself to his union.

== History ==
The idea for the Oblation was conceived during the presidency of Rafael Palma, who was the one to commission Tolentino to make the sculpture. Palma requested that the statue be based on the second verse of Rizal's Mi Ultimo Adios:

In fields of battle, deliriously fighting,

Others give you their lives, without doubt, without regret;
Where there’s cypress, laurel or lily,
On a plank or open field, in combat or cruel martyrdom,

If the home or country asks, it's all the same--it matters not.

The concrete sculpture, painted to look like bronze, measures 3.5 meters in height, symbolizing the 333 years of Spanish rule in the Philippines. The sculpture is replete with references to selfless dedication and service to the nation, and as Tolentino himself describes it,

The completely nude figure of a young man with outstretched arms and open hands, with tilted head, closed eyes and parted lips murmuring a prayer, with breast forward in the act of offering himself, is my interpretation of that sublime stanza. It symbolizes all the unknown heroes who fell during the night. The statue stands on a rustic base, a stylized rugged shape of the Philippine archipelago, lined with big and small hard rocks, each of which represents an island. The “katakataka” (wonder plant) whose roots are tightly implanted on Philippine soil, is the link that binds the symbolized figure to the allegorical Philippine Group. “Katakataka” is really a wonder plant. It is called siempre vivo (always alive) in Spanish. A leaf or a piece of it thrown anywhere will sprout into a young plant. Hence, it symbolizes the deep-rooted patriotism in the heart of our heroes. Such patriotism continually and forever grows anywhere in the Philippines.

Initially, the statue was completely naked, but for reasons of decency, it was modified by U.P. President Jorge Bocobo, 5th President of UP, adding a fig leaf to cover the genitals. The sculpture was funded by the U.P. students of 1935–36. It was presented by Potenciano Illusorio and Jose B. Laurel, Jr., presidents of the student council during the first and second semesters, respectively. The statue was dedicated in March 1939 at the University's Manila campus, the main campus then, where it stayed until February 1949, when the main administrative offices of the university moved to the new University of the Philippines Diliman campus in Quezon City. The transfer of the Oblation to its new home served as the highlight of the move from Manila, which is historically referred to as the Exodus. The sculpture in front of the Quezon Hall at UP Diliman was installed facing west, purportedly a tribute to the American roots of the university. Today, that sculpture is only a bronze replica (which was recast from the original in Italy in 1950, under the supervision of Tolentino himself) dedicated during the Golden Jubilee of U.P. on November 29, 1958. The original sculpture is kept at the Main Library (Gonzalez Hall), the former site of the U.P. College of Fine Arts.

Several replicas of the Oblation were made for the various campuses of the University of the Philippines, some by National Artist Napoleon Abueva. The Oblation at the University of the Philippines Visayas campus in Iloilo City was made by Professor Anastacio Caedo. Likewise, 2005 National Artist-nominee Glenn Bautista did his celebrated version of the Oblation in pen and ink as part of his schoolplates at the University of the Philippines College of Fine Arts under Professor Rebillon. The sculpture was registered at the Intellectual Property Office in 2004. Being the main symbol of the university, the Oblation is the centrepiece of many U.P.-related logos, like those of the Philippine Collegian and other official student publications, the U.P. Cooperative, and the U.P. Centennial emblem.

The University of the Philippines Open University Oblation sculpture is unique for its ribbon-like flag swirling around the pedestal and the replica of Guillermo Tolentino's U.P. Oblation. This gives an effect of the flag lifting the Oblation to greater heights and rendering it the boundless reach that is symbolic of U.P.O.U.'s prime objective of widening access to U.P. quality education. Completed in 2005, it was designed and executed by University Artist and U.P.O.U. Chancellor Dr. Grace J. Alfonso.

== Locations ==
As the primary icon of the University of the Philippines, oblation statues are located on the campuses of its constituent universities, often on plazas named "oblation" after the statue, and in front of many U.P.'s satellite campuses. It is also located in the Abueva Ancestral House in Bohol, which is the ancestral home of two notable UP alumni, former UP President Jose Abueva and National Artist Napoleon Abueva.

At the Philippine General Hospital

At UP Baguio

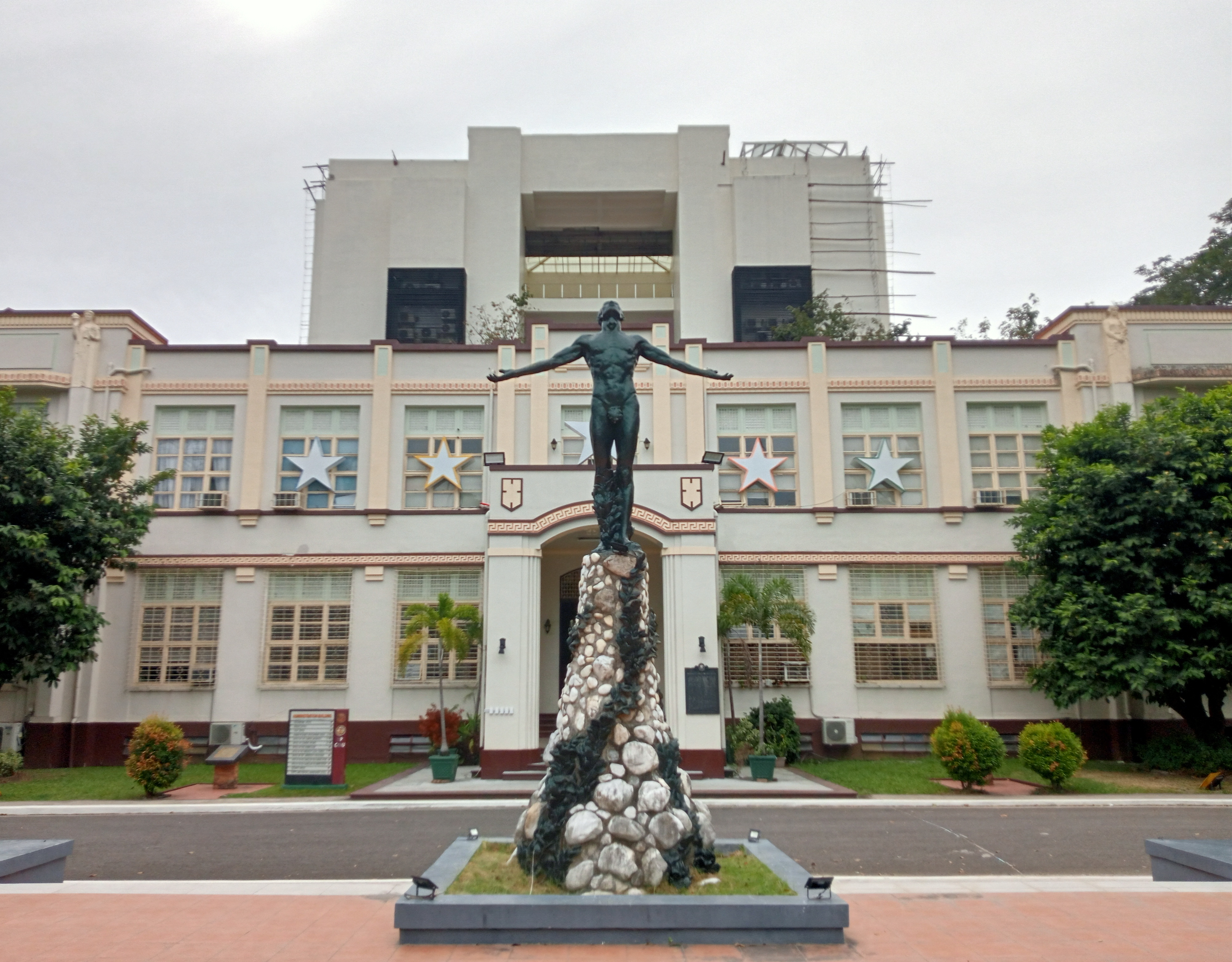
At UP Cebu

At UP Los Baños

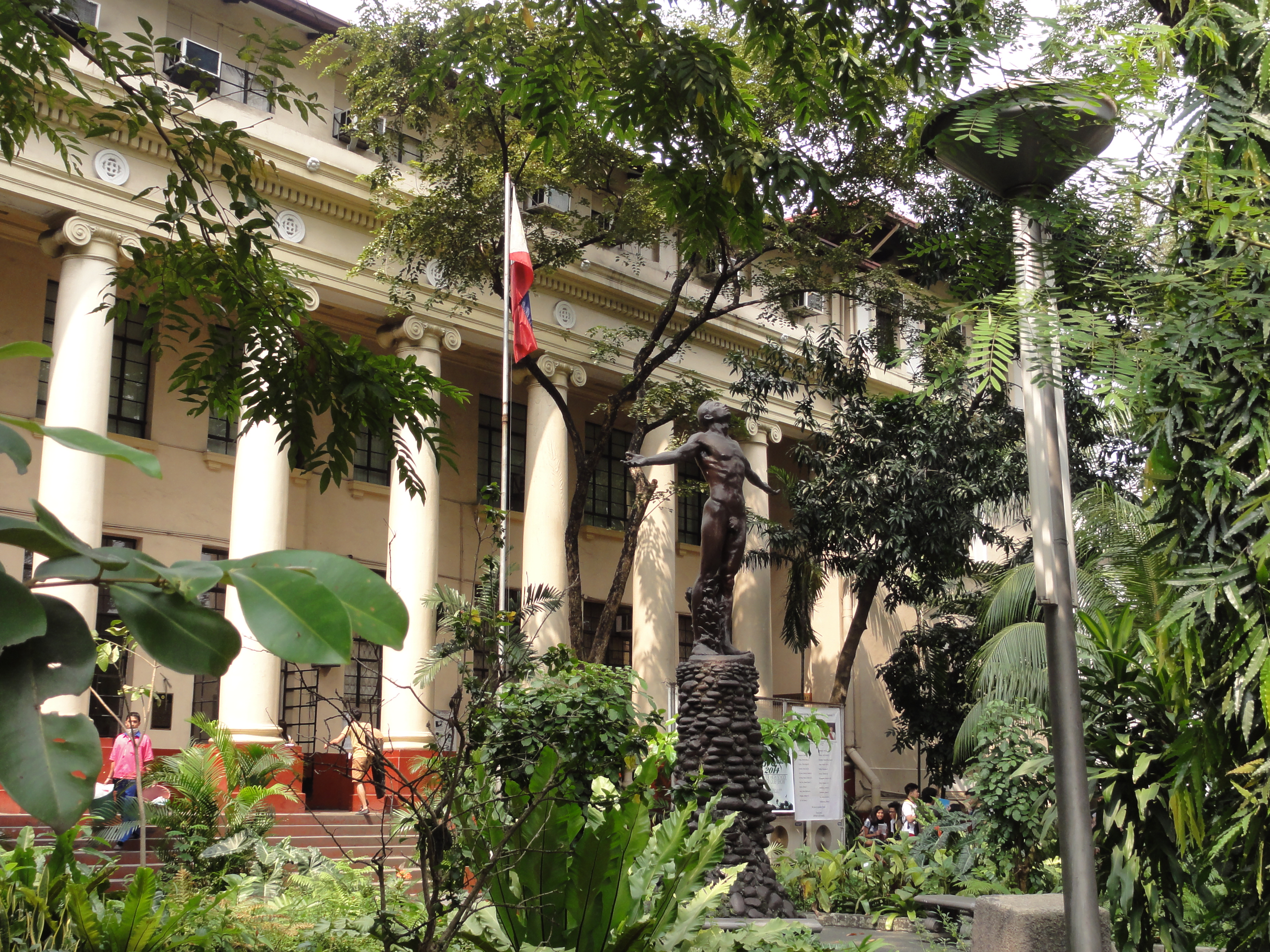
At UP Manila

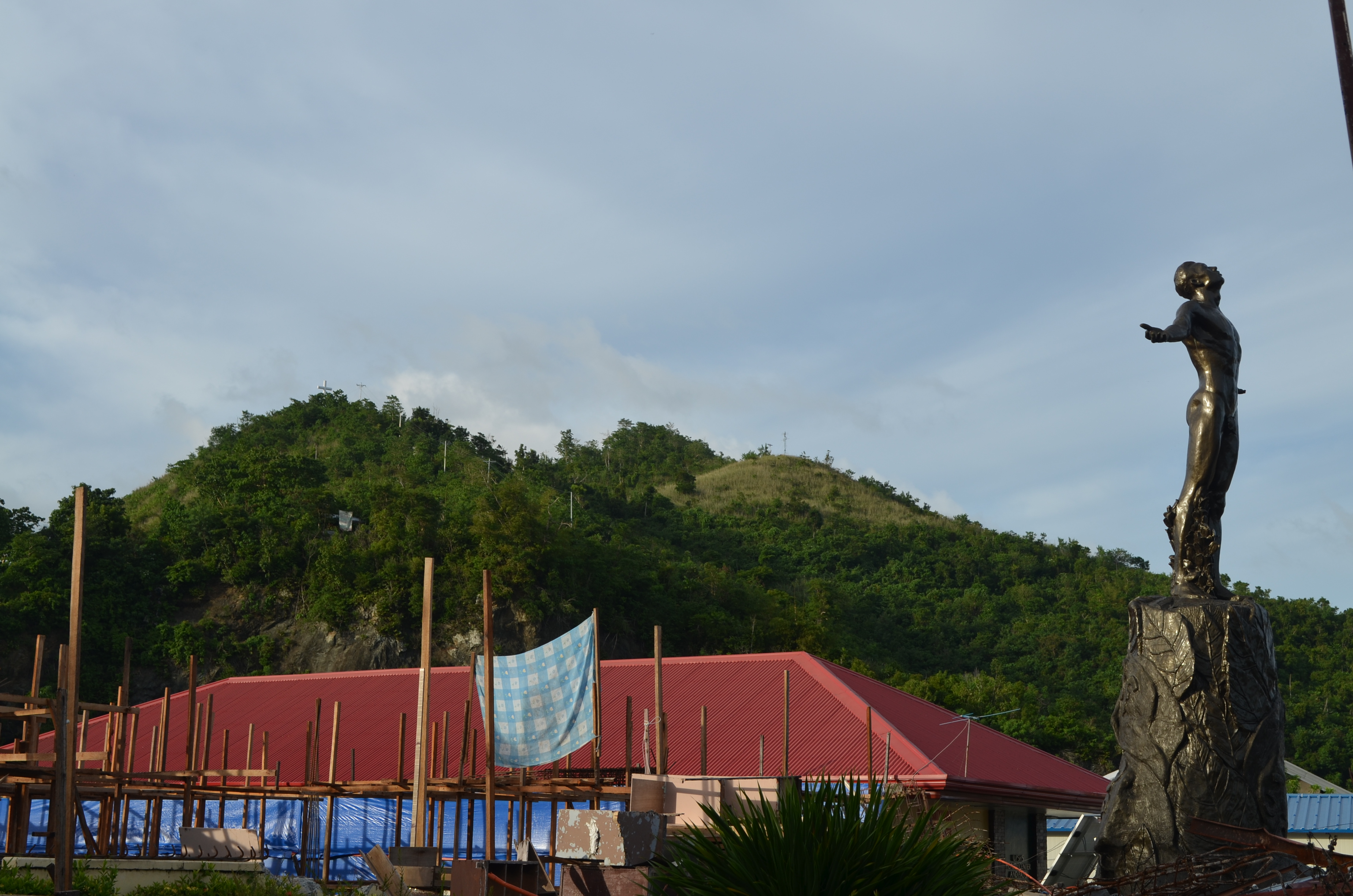
At the UP Manila School of Health Sciences in Leyte

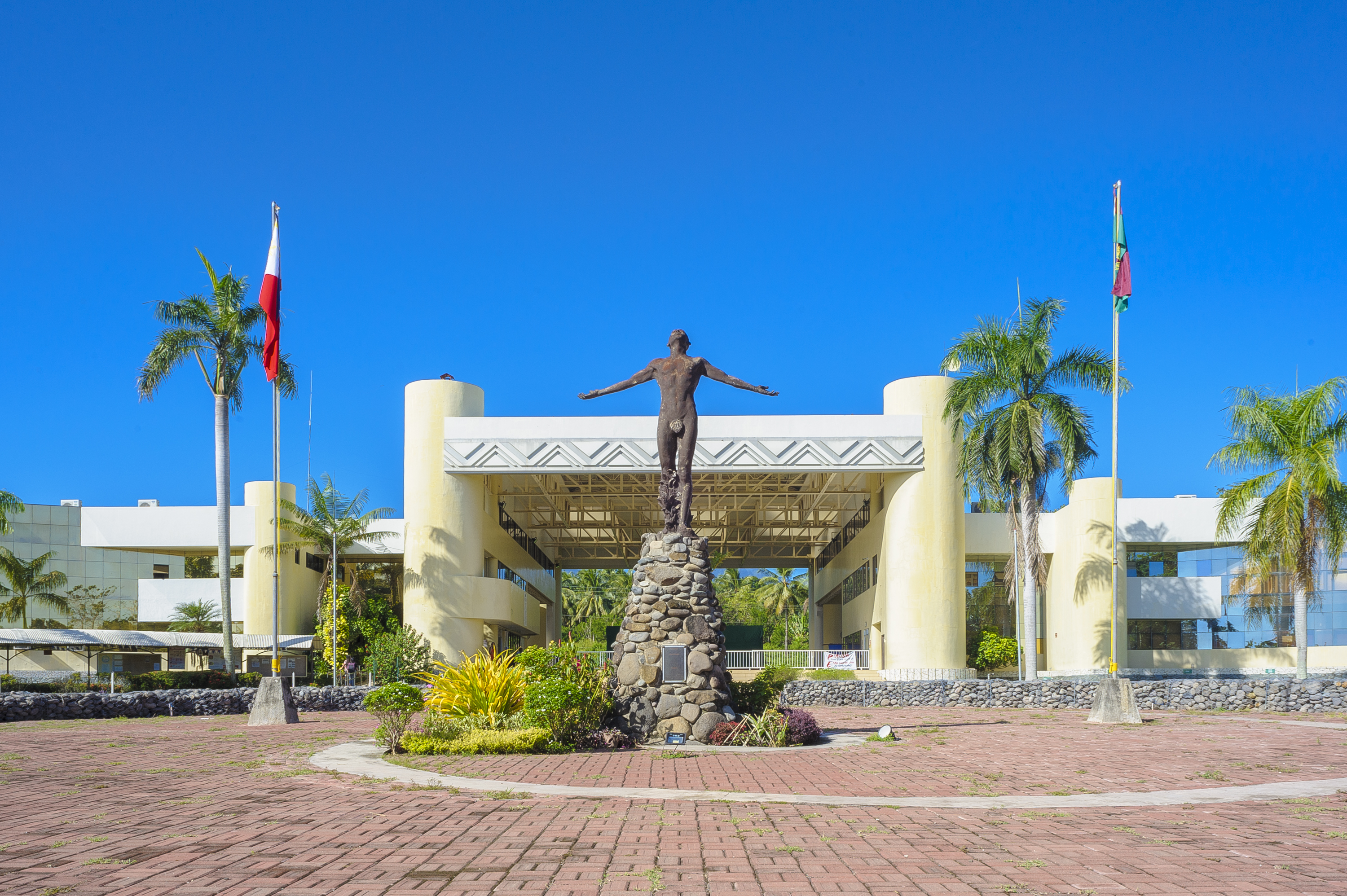
At UP Mindanao

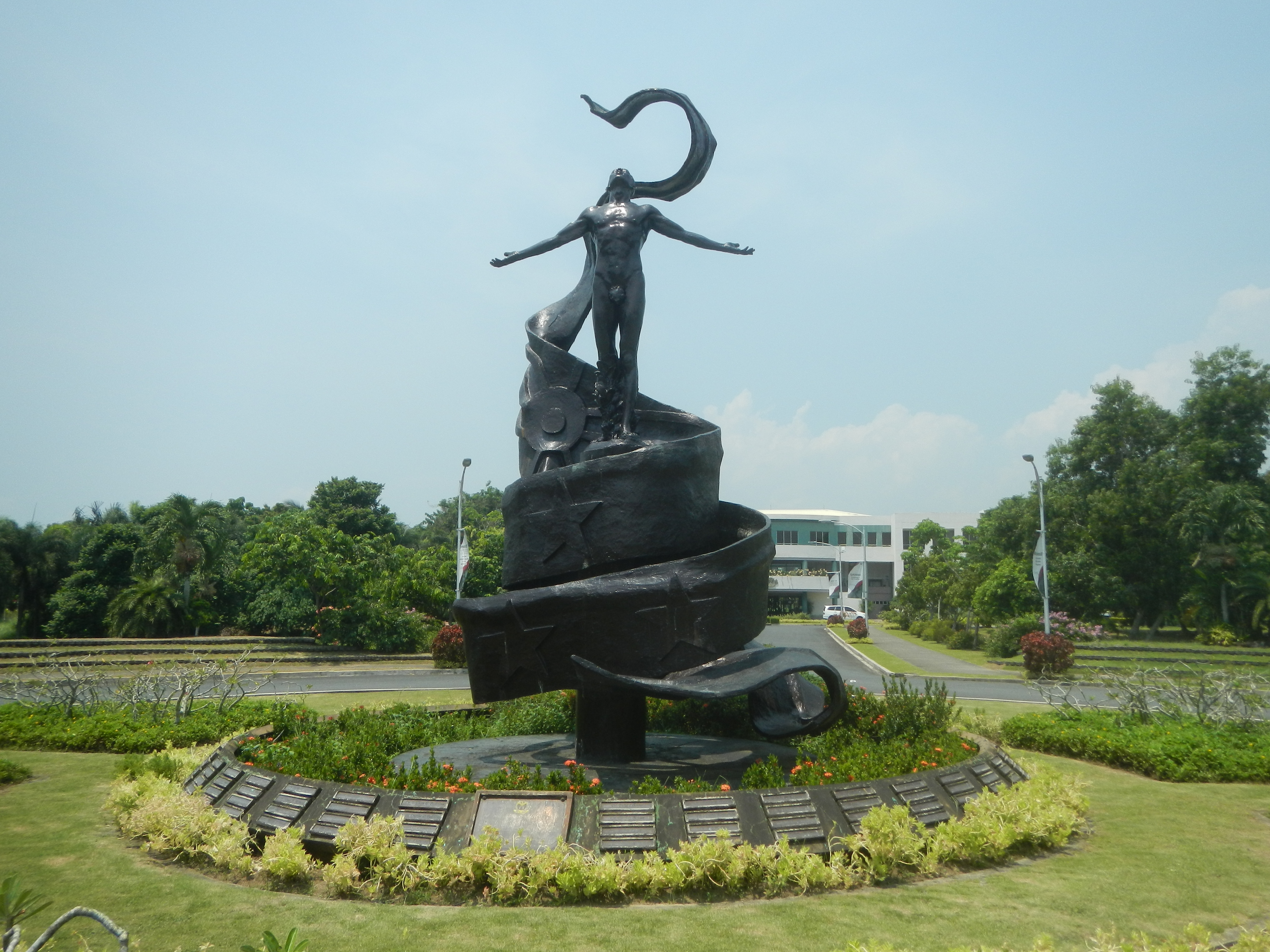
At the UP Open University

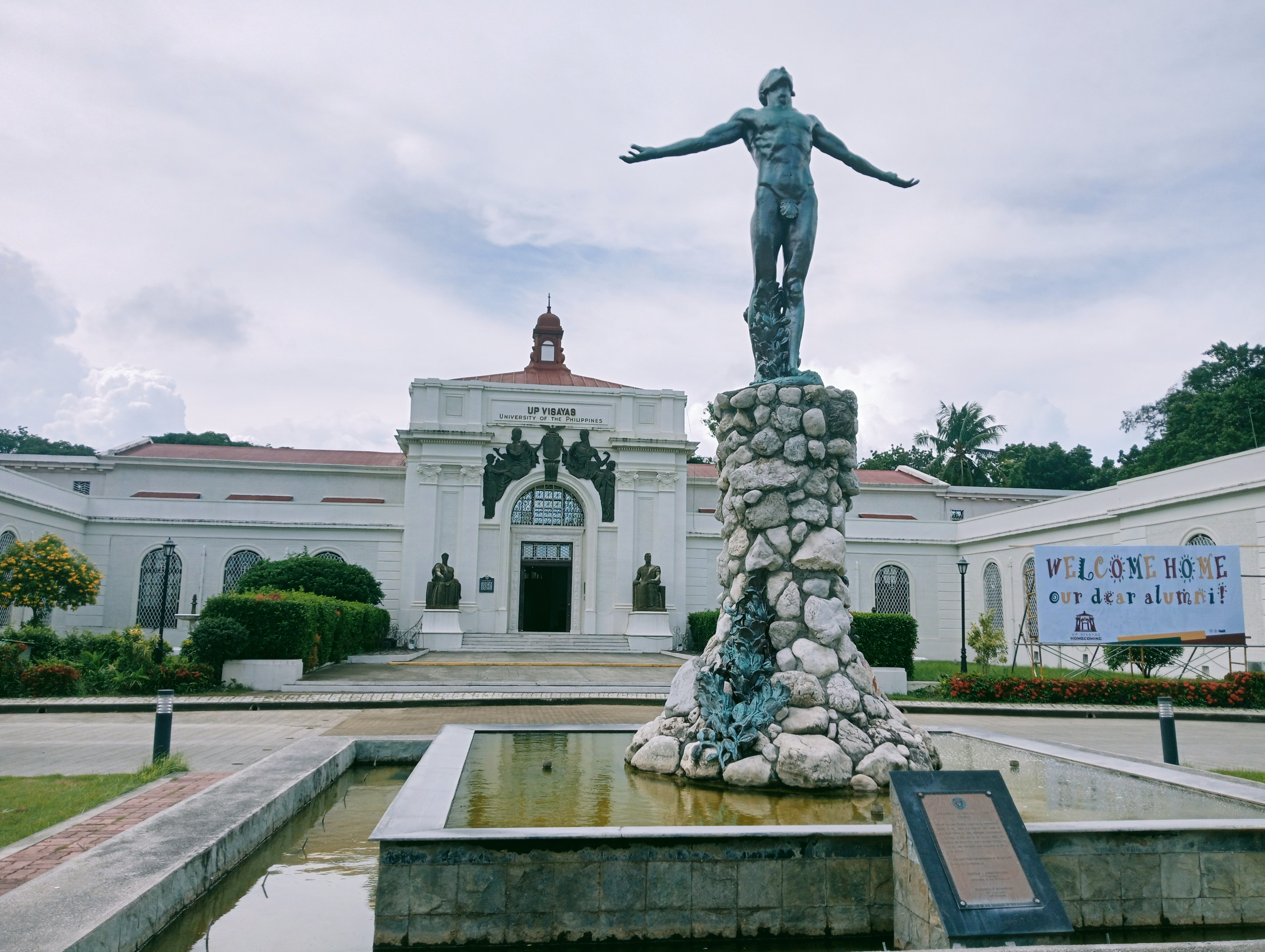
At the UP Visayas - Iloilo City campus

At the UP Visayas - Miagao campus

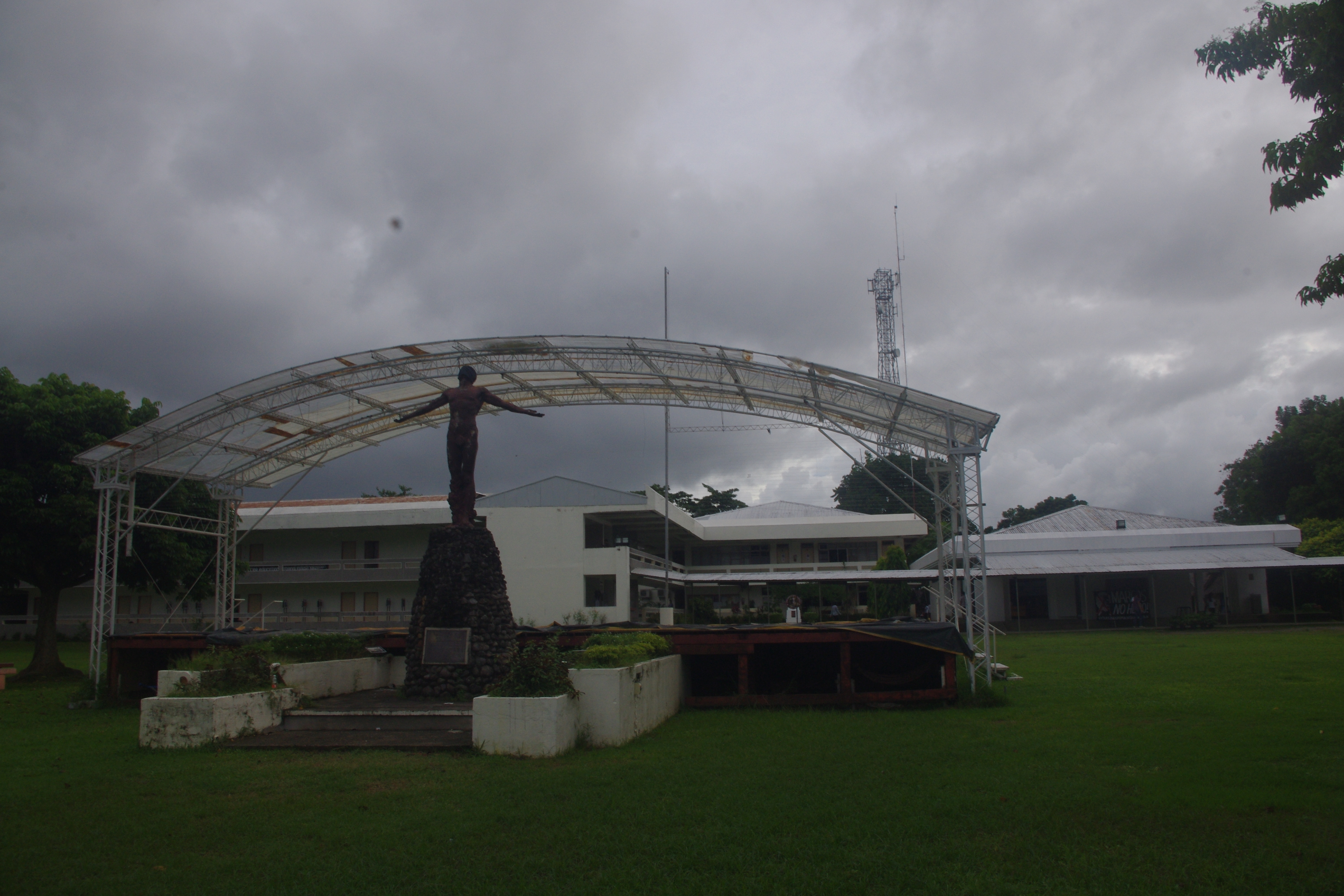
At UP Tacloban

== Model ==
The identity of the person who served as the model of the sculpture has long been the subject of speculation.

University literature records the names of two individuals who served as models for the oblation: Tolentino's student assistant, Anastacio Caedo, and Tolentino's brother-in-law, Virgilio Raymundo. Specifically, Tolentino used Caedo's physique and Raymundo's proportion for reference. Caedo would later become a professor of Fine Arts in the university himself, succeeding the deceased Tolentino. His works now form part of the University Collection, and one of his monuments of Jose Rizal for the German government was installed in an eponymous Park in Wilhelmsfeld, Germany. Caedo was the one who created the U.P. Baguio Oblation.

An urban legend claims that director-actor Fernando Poe, Sr. was the model, as he was a student at the university at the time the Oblation was being made. Other names that have said to pose for the sculpture include a friend of Tolentino, Ferdinand Glenn Gagarin and fireman June Villanueva.

== Oblation Run ==
The Oblation Run at University of the Philippines Diliman is an annual tradition inspired by the Oblation done by the members of the Alpha Phi Omega, one of the prominent and influential U.P. fraternities. Members of the fraternity run around the campus naked (a concept known as streaking) to protest their sentiments about a current political or economic situation.

== "100 Nudes/100 Years" ==
Inspired by the U.P. Oblation, the University of the Philippines Alumni Association (U.P.A.A.) launched an art exhibit, "100 Nudes/100 Years" featuring the works of nine U.P. alumni national artists.

== See also ==
- Oblation
- Katakataka
