= University of the Philippines High School in Iloilo =

Public high school in Iloilo City, Philippines

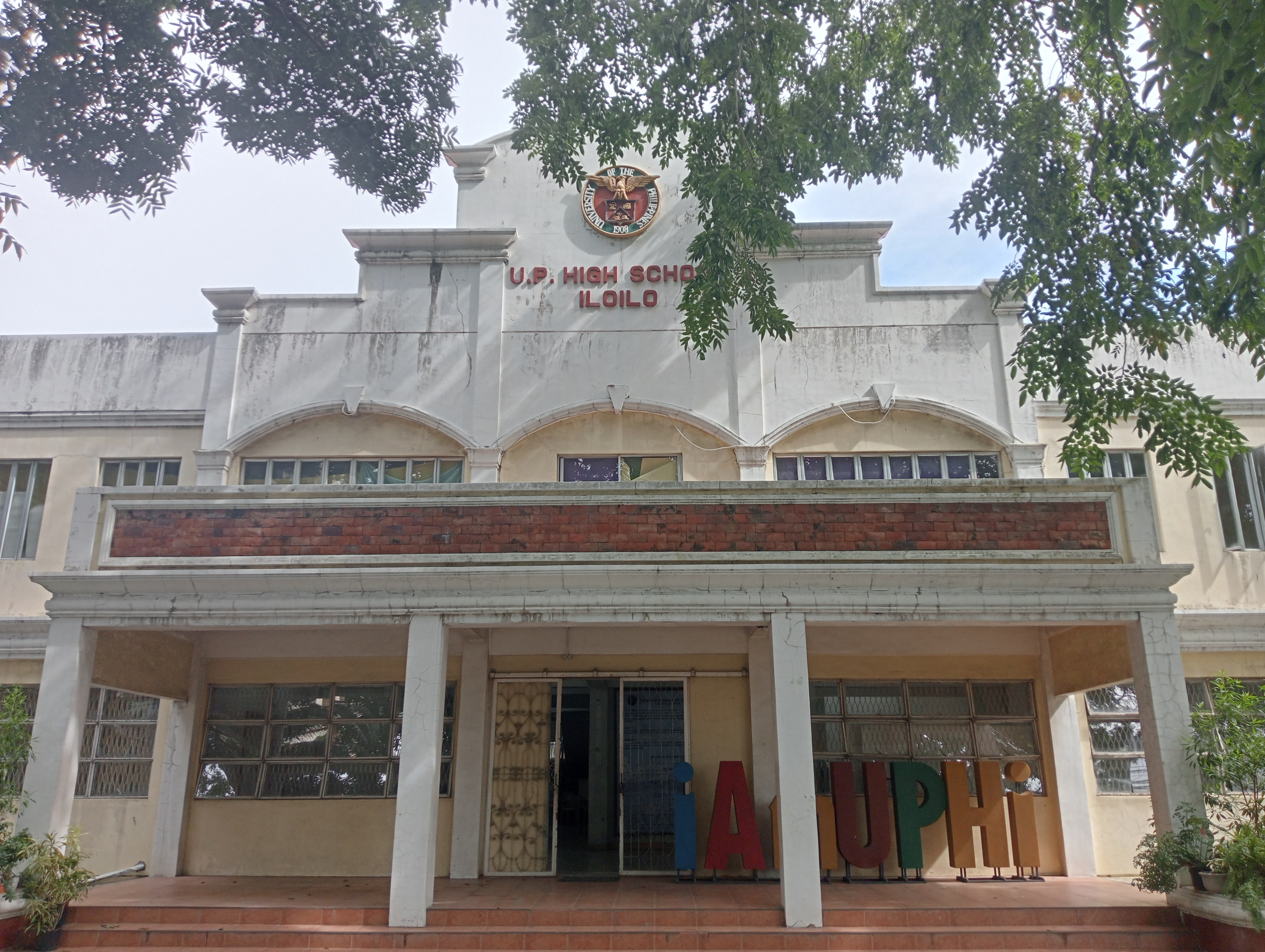

Location
- Iloilo City; Philippines; 10°41′58″N 122°33′20″E

Information
- Type: UP Administered Laboratory School
- Motto: Honor, Excellence, Service
- Established: July 1, 1947
- Dean: Prof. Pepito R. Fernandez Jr.
- Principal: Asst. Prof. Edelia T. Braga
- Grades: 7 to 12
- Enrollment: 519 (2024-2025)
- Colors: U.P. Maroon and U.P. Forest Green
- Mascot: U.P. Oblation
- Nickname: UP Fighting Maroons
- Website: www.upv.edu.ph

The University of the Philippines High School in Iloilo, also known as UP High School in Iloilo or simply UPHSI, is one of the four high school departments under the University of the Philippines System. The three other units are the UP Integrated School (UP Diliman), UP Rural High School (UP Los Baños), and UP High School Cebu (UP Cebu).

UP High School in Iloilo was established in July 1947 as a lower division for junior and senior year levels under the wing of the University of the Philippines Iloilo College (UPIC). By 1954, UPIC was upgraded as a full-fledged college and all year levels for the high school department were finally offered. It is an experimental laboratory of the College of Arts and Sciences that provides innovative teaching strategies and academic training as groundwork for admission to the undergraduate programs of the University of the Philippines.

It is under the Division of Professional Education of UP Visayas and located within the UPV Iloilo City campus.

The high school is designed for the underprivileged but talented and intellectually gifted students of Iloilo. In accordance with the UP Policy for democratized admission, the students of the UP High School in Iloilo do not pay tuition fees.

== Notable Graduates ==
- Franklin Drilon - former Senate President of the Philippines
- Rommel Espinosa - former Chancellor of the University of the Philippines Visayas
- Arthur Defensor Jr.- Governor of Iloilo
- Jed Patrick Mabilog - former Mayor of Iloilo City
- Mariano Araneta - former President of the Philippine Football Federation (PFF)
- Francis H. Jardeleza - former Associate Justice of the Supreme Court of the Philippines
