= University of the Philippines Tacloban =

National University System Unit in Leyte, Philippines

- Unibersidad ng Pilipinas Tacloban (Filipino)
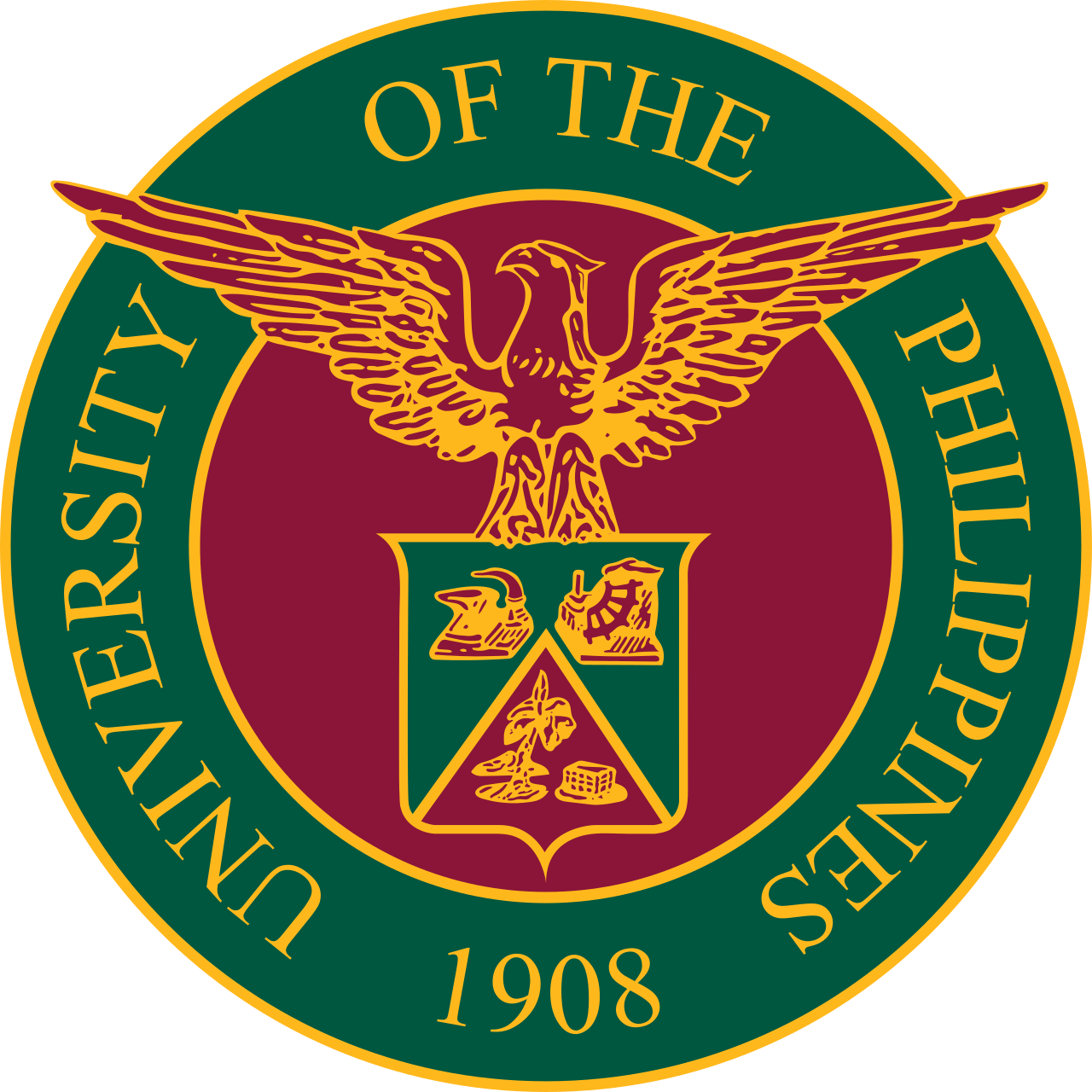
- Motto: Honor, Excellence, Service
- Type: Regional state higher education institution
- Established: May 23, 1973; 53 years ago
- Chancellor: John Paul T. Yusiong
- President: Angelo Jimenez
- Location: Magsaysay Street, Tacloban, Philippines; 11°14′54″N 125°0′26″E
- Hymn: U.P. Naming Mahal
- Website: www.uptacloban.edu.ph
- Location in the Visayas Location in the Philippines

The University of the Philippines Tacloban (Waray: Unibersidad han Pilipinas Tacloban) is a public research university located in Tacloban, Philippines. Established on May 23, 1973, it was officially elevated to a constituent university within the University of the Philippines System on May 27, 2026. It serves as the system's ninth constituent unit, focusing on higher education, research, and public service in the Eastern Visayas region.

== History ==
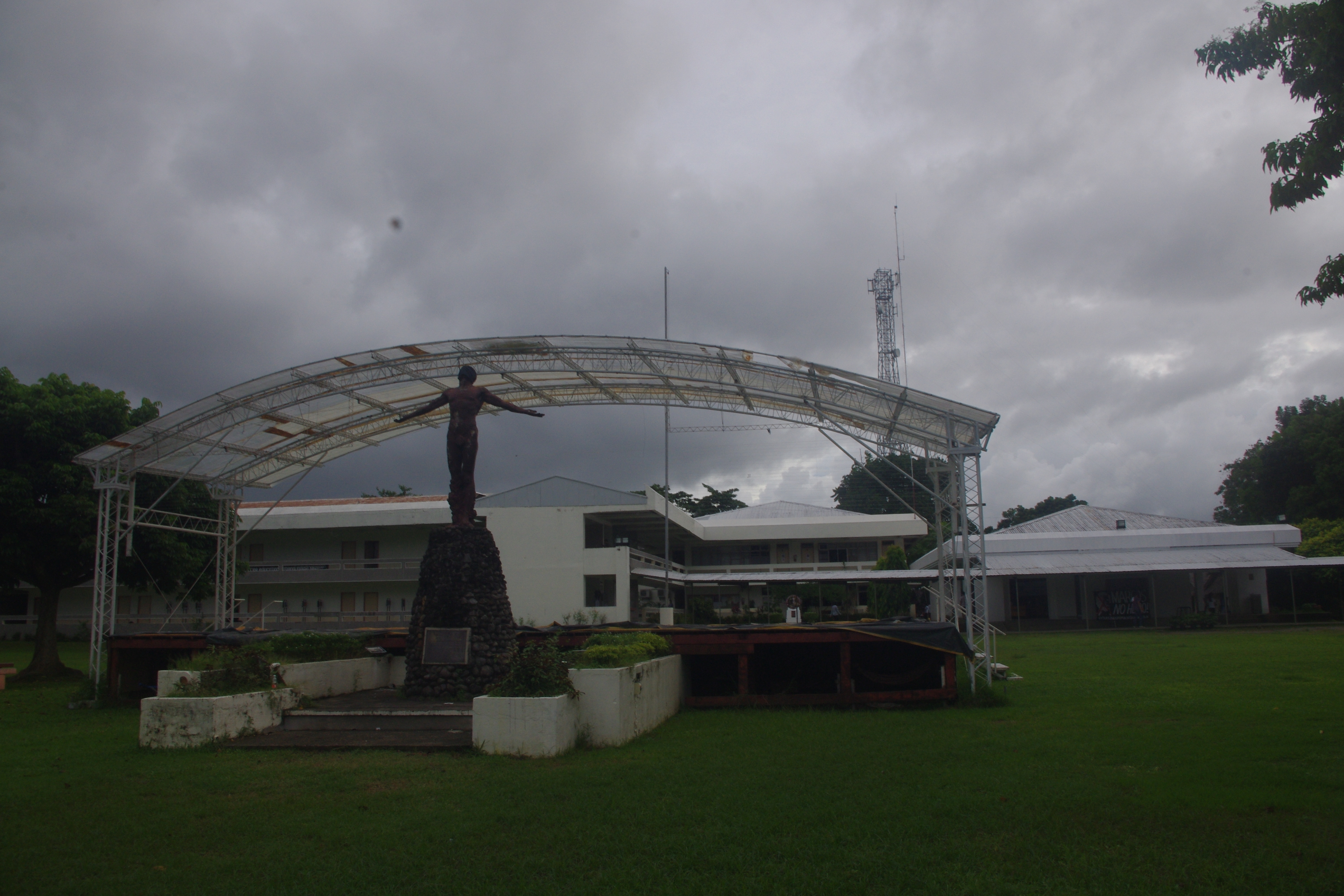
Oblation and campus buildings

In its 833rd meeting, the University of the Philippines (UP) Board of Regents established the UP College Tacloban. It was recognized as a regional unit of the System on May 23, 1973 and inaugurated on July 2, 1973.

Ten years later, Executive Order No. 4 placed UP College Tacloban under the administrative supervision of University of the Philippines Visayas.

A new campus will be constructed in Barangay Santa Elena in Tacloban City after the Department of Budget and Management (DBM) approved the funding for the construction of the access road from the national highway to the campus site recently.

On November 8, 2013, the college sustained severe damage and lost one employee and four of its students due to Typhoon Yolanda. Due to the extent of the damage incurred by the college, its students were forced to enroll in other University of the Philippines campuses such as UP Cebu. University of the Philippines Visayas sent cash aid to support UP Tacloban's faculty members a few days after the typhoon hit.

On April 17, 2023, during his opening remarks at the Climate Talks Philippines forum at the UP Tacloban Multi-Purpose Building, UP President Angelo A. Jimenez announced the approval of the Presidential Advisory Council (PAC) to elevate UP Tacloban as an autonomous college of the UP System. In its 1380th meeting, held on 27 April 2023, the UP Board of Regents approved the elevation of UP Tacloban College from being one of the campuses of UP Visayas to an autonomous unit of the University under the Office of the UP President.

On May 27, 2026, the UP Board of Regents officially elevated UP Tacloban as the 9th constituent university of the UP System.

== Admissions ==
=== UP College Admission Test (UPCAT) ===
Admission into the University of the Philippines' undergraduate programs is very competitive, with over 100,000 students taking the exam every year, with about 11,000 being accepted. To maintain its high standard of education and to maximize its limited resources, UP has had to limit slots for undergraduate admission to each campus and to its various degree programs by means of qualification through the University of the Philippines College Admission Test (UPCAT).

== Organization ==
University of the Philippines Tacloban Deans
Name	Tenure of office
Alejandro M. Fernandez (acting)	1973
Nestor M. Nisperos	1973–1975
Benjamin M. Catane	1975–1986
Albino C. Lumen	1986–1988
Antonio A. Abilar	1988–1991
Zosimo E. Lee	1991–1994
Viola C. Siozon	1994–2000
Diana S. Aure (OIC)	2000
Marieta B. Sumagaysay	2000–2006
Virgildo E. Sabalo	2006–2009
Margarita T. De La Cruz	2009–2012
Anita G. Cular	2012–2016
Virgildo E. Sabalo	2016–2019
Patricia B. Arinto	2019–2026
University of the Philippines Tacloban Chancellors
Name	Tenure of office
Patricia B. Arinto (acting)	2026
John Paul T. Yusiong	2026–present
Academic Units
Unit	Foundation
School of Humanities (SoH)	2026
College of Social Sciences and Management (CSSM)	2026
College of Sciences (CS)	2026

UP Tacloban is organized into:

- School of Humanities (SoH)
  - Department of Literature and Media Arts (DLMA)
  - Department of Human Kinetics (DHK)
- College of Social Sciences and Management (CSSM)
  - Department of Economics and Political Science (DEPS)
  - Department of Psychology (DPsych)
  - Department of Accountancy and Management (DAME)
- College of Sciences (CS)
  - Department of Biology and Environmental Sciences (DBES)
  - Department of Computer Science and Mathematics (DCSM)

The college is also home to three research and public service offices: the Leyte Samar Heritage Center (LSHC), the Regional Environmental Information Systems (REIS), and the Office of Continuing Education and Pahinungod (OCEP).

== Academic programs ==
=== Undergraduate ===
- Bachelor of Arts in Media Arts
- Bachelor of Arts in Literature
- Bachelor of Arts in Psychology
- Bachelor of Science in Economics
- Bachelor of Arts in Political Science
- Bachelor of Science in Accountancy
- Bachelor of Science in Biology
- Bachelor of Science in Computer Science
- Bachelor of Science in Management
- Bachelor of Science in Applied Mathematics

=== Graduate ===
- Master of Management (Business Management)
- Master of Management (Public Management)
- Master of Science (Environmental Science)
- Master of Science in Computer Science

== Research centers ==
- Leyte Samar Heritage Center
- Regional Environmental Information System

== Notable alumni ==
- Tiff Ronato, actress, beauty queen, and Pinoy Big Brother: Kumunity Season 10 teen housemate.

== See also ==
- University of the Philippines Baguio
- University of the Philippines Cebu
- University of the Philippines Diliman
- University of the Philippines Los Baños
- University of the Philippines Manila
- University of the Philippines Mindanao
- University of the Philippines Open University
- University of the Philippines Visayas
