= University of the Philippines Mindanao =

Public university in Davao City, Philippines

- Unibersidad ng Pilipinas Mindanao (Filipino)
- Shaping minds that shape the nation
- Motto: Honor, Excellence, Service
- Type: Public, research coeducational higher education institution
- Established: February 20, 1995 (campus); March 22, 1995 (as constituent university)
- Academic affiliations: APRU, ASAIHL, AUN, AEUN, DACUN
- Chancellor: Lyre Anni E. Murao
- Faculty: 102 (AY 2020–2021)
- Students: 1,355 (AY 2021–2022)
- Undergraduates: 1,194 (AY 2021-2022)
- Postgraduates: 161 (AY 2021-2022)
- Location: Davao City, Davao del Sur, Philippines; 7°05′08.58″N 125°29′05.59″E
- Campus: Rural 204 hectares (2,040,000 m^{2})
- Hymn: "U.P. Naming Mahal" ("U.P. Beloved")
- Colors: Maroon Forest Green
- Nickname: Fighting Maroons
- Website: www.upmin.edu.ph

- Location in Mindanao Location in the Philippines

The University of the Philippines Mindanao (also referred to as UPMin or UP Mindanao) is a public research university, serving as the sixth constituent unit of the University of the Philippines System. UP Mindanao is the only constituent university of the UP System that was created through legislative action.

The university offers 12 undergraduate degree programs (1 associate, 11 bachelor), 10 graduate, and 2 post-graduate programs. The university is the one of its kind in the Philippines to have a discipline in Agribusiness Economics (ABE), and is one of the three worldwide to have such a degree program.

UP Mindanao is composed of two colleges and two schools, all located within its campus at Mintal, Tugbok District, Davao City.

== History ==
Republic Act 7889, entitled, "An Act Creating the University of the Philippines Mindanao," was enacted into law on February 20, 1995, by President Fidel V. Ramos, after decades of lobbying from Mindanaoan UP alumni for the creation of a “UP in Mindanao". On March 22 of the same year, the Board of Regents passed a resolution officially creating the University of the Philippines Mindanao. To emphasize the importance of RA 7889 to the Mindanaoans, a re-enactment of the signing was held at the Bangko Sentral ng Pilipinas, with President Ramos himself in attendance. In that same year, Rogelio V. Cuyno was appointed as UP Mindanao's first dean, later becoming its first chancellor.

The Lee Business Center in Juan Luna Street corner J. de la Cruz Street, and the Casa Mercado Building in Matina served as UP Mindanao's home from March to September 1995 and from September 1995 to January 1996 respectively, until it relocated to Ladislawa Avenue. In 1997, the Elias B. Lopez Residential Hall was constructed. It was initially envisioned to be a dormitory for female students, as the existing structures used by UP Mindanao inside the Philippine Coconut Authority (PCA) building was a male-only dormitory. From 2001 to 2009, the Administration Building was constructed, while its internal road network was finished in 2013. In 2015, UP alumni from across Mindanao joined in constructing the UP Mindanao Oblation Plaza as part of the university’s 20th founding anniversary.

== Organization ==
=== Administration ===
Chancellors of UP Mindanao
Chancellor	Term of office
Rogelio V. Cuyno	1995–1998 (as dean) 1998–2001 (as chancellor)
Ricardo M. de Ungria	2001–2007
Gilda C. Rivero	2007–2013
Sylvia B. Concepcion	2013–2019
Larry N. Digal	2019–2022
Lyre Anni E. Murao	2022–present

UP Mindanao is governed by the 11-member Board of Regents composed of the UP President, the Chairman of the Commission on Higher Education (CHED), the chairpersons of the Committee of Higher Education of the Senate and the House of Representatives, four regents representing the student, faculty, alumni and staff sectors, and three regents who are appointed by the President of the Philippines.

The President of the university is an ex officio member of the University Council of each constituent university and presides over its meetings whenever present.

Academic units of UP Mindanao
Unit	Foundation
College of Humanities and Social Sciences (CHSS)	1997
College of Science and Mathematics (CSM)	1997
School of Management (SOM)	1995
School of Medicine (SoMed)	2026

UP Mindanao is organized under the Office of the Chancellor, Office of the Vice Chancellor for Administration, Office of the Vice Chancellor for Academic Affairs, and four academic units: two colleges and one school; the new School of Medicine (SoMed) is provisionally operated as part of UP Manila during its first years of operation.

== Academics ==
=== Admission ===
Admission into UP Mindanao’s undergraduate degree programs is determined through the University of the Philippines College Admission Test (UPCAT), with the exception of its associate program in sports studies, whose admission process involves a performance review.

As mandated in its founding law, UP Mindanao prioritizes the admission of Lumad and Muslim Mindanao students. This is done through the UPCAT and through affirmative action activities implemented by the Office of the University Registrar (OUR) together with the UP Mindanao Pahinungód Office and other administrative units.

Scholarships are also available for interested student applicants to avail, such as those offered by the UP Mindanao Foundation Inc. (UPMFI). The Office of Student Affairs (OSA) promotes, manages, and assists students with scholarship and financial assistance arrangements.

=== Degree progams ===
UP Mindanao offers the following academic programs:

==== Undergraduate programs ====
Degree-granting unit	Degree program	Recommended duration of study
College of Humanities and Social Sciences	Associate in Arts Sports Studies (AASS)	2 years (4 regular semesters)
College of Humanities and Social Sciences	Bachelor of Sports Science (BSS)	4 years (8 regular semesters) or 2 years (4 regular semesters) for graduates from the AASS program
College of Humanities and Social Sciences	Bachelor of Arts in Communication and Media Arts (BACMA)	4 years (8 regular semesters + 1 practicum semester)
College of Humanities and Social Sciences	Bachelor of Arts in English, Major in Creative Writing (BAE-CW)	4 years (8 regular semesters)
College of Humanities and Social Sciences	Bachelor of Science in Anthropology (BSAnthro)	4 years (8 regular semesters + 1 research semester)
College of Humanities and Social Sciences	Bachelor of Science in Architecture (BSArch)	5 years (10 regular semesters)
College of Science and Mathematics	Bachelor of Science in Applied Mathematics (BSAM)	4 years (8 regular semesters + 1 practicum semester)
College of Science and Mathematics	Bachelor of Science in Biology (BSBio)	4 years (8 regular semesters)
College of Science and Mathematics	Bachelor of Science in Computer Science (BSCS)	4 years (8 regular semesters + 1 practicum semester)
College of Science and Mathematics	Bachelor of Science in Data Science (BSDS)	4 years (8 regular semesters + 1 practicum semester)
College of Science and Mathematics	Bachelor of Science in Food Technology (BSFT)	4 years (8 regular semesters + 1 practicum semester)
School of Management	Bachelor of Science in Agribusiness Economics (BSABE)	4 years (8 regular semesters + 1 practicum semester)

==== Graduate and post-graduate programs ====
Degree-granting unit	Degree program	Recommended duration of study
College of Humanities and Social Sciences	Diploma in Exercise and Sports Science (DESS)	2 years (4 regular semesters)
College of Humanities and Social Sciences	Diploma in Urban and Regional Planning (DURP)	1.5 years (3 regular semesters)
College of Humanities and Social Sciences	Master of Arts in Urban and Regional Planning (MAURP)	1 thesis semester; requires a grade of 1.75 from the DURP program and passing of comprehensive exam
College of Humanities and Social Sciences	Master of Science in Human Movement Science (MSHMS)	
College of Science and Mathematics	Master of Science in Biology (MSBio)	
College of Science and Mathematics	Master of Science in Civil Engineering (MSCE), in consortium with UP Diliman and support from UP Los Baños	3 years (5 regular semesters)
College of Science and Mathematics	Master of Science in Food Science (MSFS)	
College of Science and Mathematics	Master of Science in Industrial Engineering (MSIE), in consortium with UP Diliman and support from UP Los Baños	2 years (4 regular semesters)
College of Science and Mathematics	Master of Engineering in Industrial Engineering (MEng IE), in consortium with UP Diliman and support from UP Los Baños	2 years (4 regular semesters)
School of Management	Master in Management (MM)	2 years (4 regular semesters)
School of Management	PhD by Research	
School of Medicine	Doctor of Medicine (MD), in consortium with UP Manila	5 years (4 regular semesters + 2 clerkship semesters + 4 clinical internship semesters)

== Campus ==
Admin

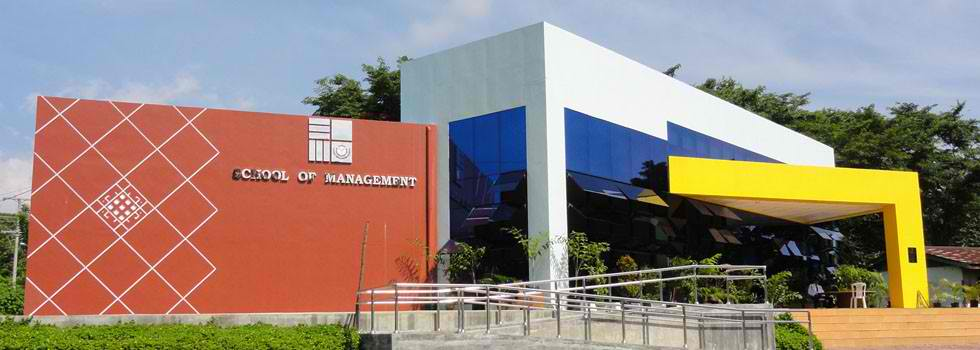
SOM Building 1

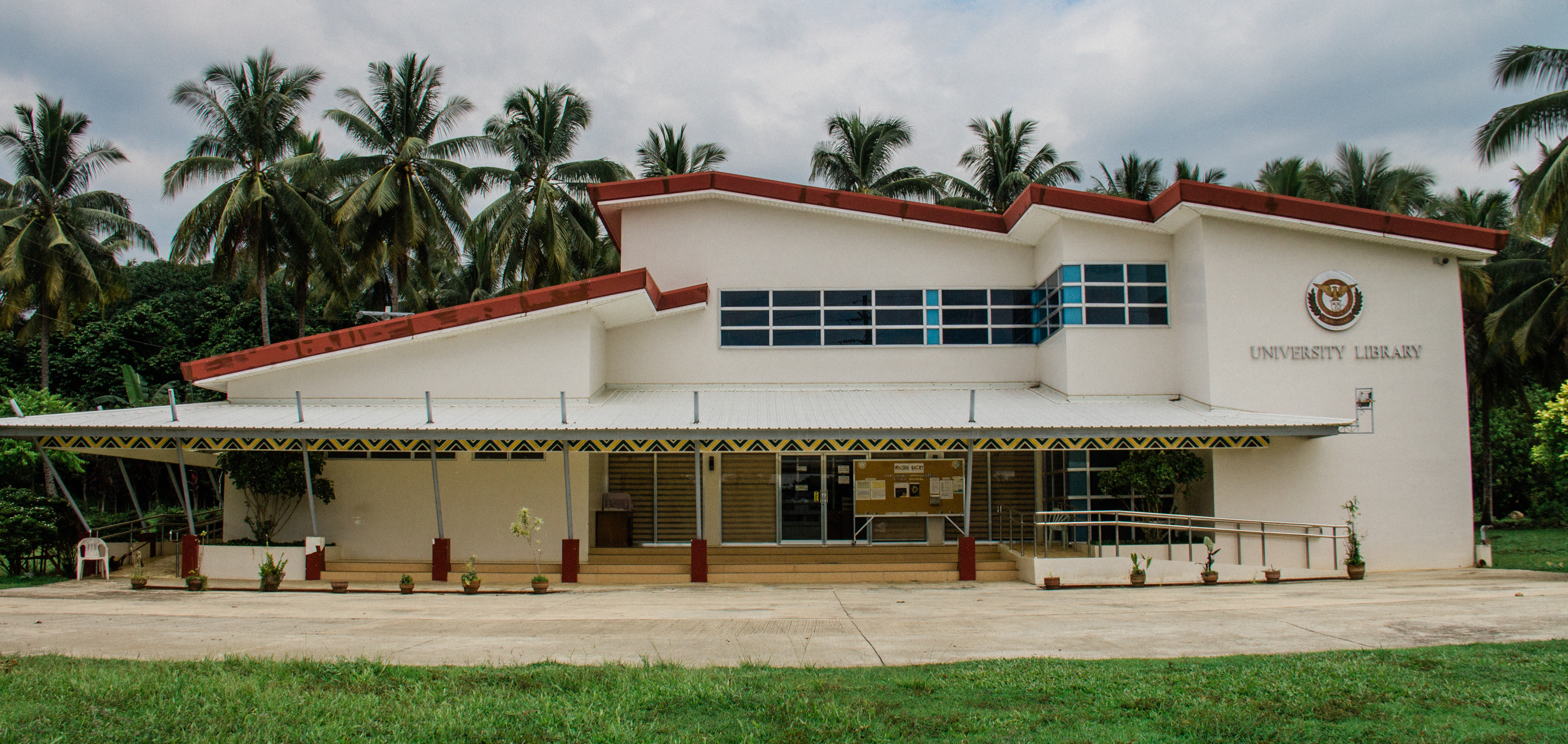
University Library

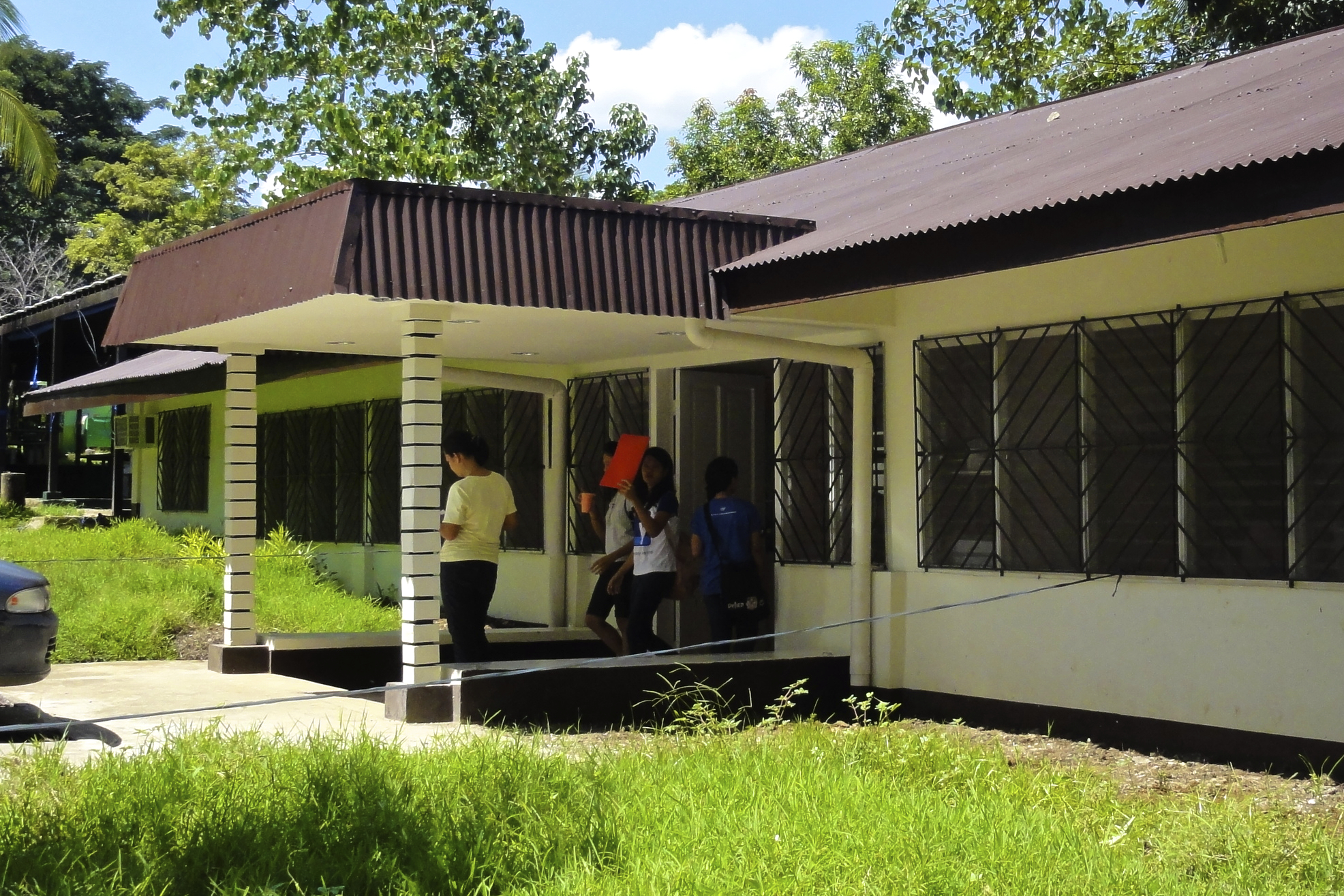
Kalimudan Student Center

UP Mindanao is located within a 204 hectare property at Barangay Mintal, Davao City. The campus structures are inspired by Mindanaoan architectural motifs and designs, notably the Administration Building (Admin), which is inspired by the Quezon Hall of UP Diliman. Admin houses administrative offices, such as those of the Chancellor and Vice Chancellors, and the College of Humanities and Social Sciences (CHSS).

In front of Admin is the UP Mindanao Oblation (Pahinungod/Oblasyon) statue sculpted by National Artist Napoleon Abueva, a replica of the original Oblation statue made by National Artist Guillermo E. Tolentino. The statue was originally placed in front of the College of Science and Mathematics (CSM) Building in 1995 before moved to its current location in the early 2000s upon construction of Admin.

UPMin is centered in the Academic Oval, where Admin, the CSM building (also known as Kanluran) and the School of Management Complex are located. Other buildings located within this area are University Library, Elias B. Lopez Residential Hall Complex (EBL Dorm), Center for the Advancement of Research in Mindanao (CARIM) Building, the CHSS Cultural Complex, and the former Human Kinetics Building.

To the west of the Academic Oval is the Davao City-UP Mindanao Sports Complex, which houses the Department of Human Kinetics and all sports facilities of the university. Meanwhile to the east is the Kalimudan Student Center, which houses commercial businesses and student facilities such as the University Student Council (USC) House, Himati (official student publication) House, Plaza Pag-Asa gymnasium and open grounds, UP Mindanao Masjid, the University Infirmary, Department of Architecture laboratories, and the Faculty and Staff Housing Hall.

Even before the establishment of UPMin, Barangay Mintal and Barangay Bago Oshiro, are known for its agriculture research centers. The Philippine Science High School Southern Mindanao Campus at nearby Barangay Sto. Niño and the Mindanao Science Centrum at Barangay Bago Oshiro further define the area as an "academic and research hub".

With the establishment of UPMin in Mintal, there became a university town within Davao City, with businesses and establishments built around the university accommodating to the needs of the students and faculty. Furthermore, the UP Mindanao Land Use and Master Development Plan aims to create UP Mindanao a "Green University Town", being a "garden" campus with emphasis on the Mindanaoan culture, with each building reflecting each ethnolinguistic group in Mindanao

== See also ==
- State Universities and Colleges (Philippines)
- List of University of the Philippines people
- University of the Philippines Baguio
- University of the Philippines Cebu
- University of the Philippines Diliman
- University of the Philippines Los Baños
- University of the Philippines Manila
- University of the Philippines Open University
- University of the Philippines Tacloban
- University of the Philippines Visayas
