= University of the Philippines Open University =

Public university in Laguna, Philippines

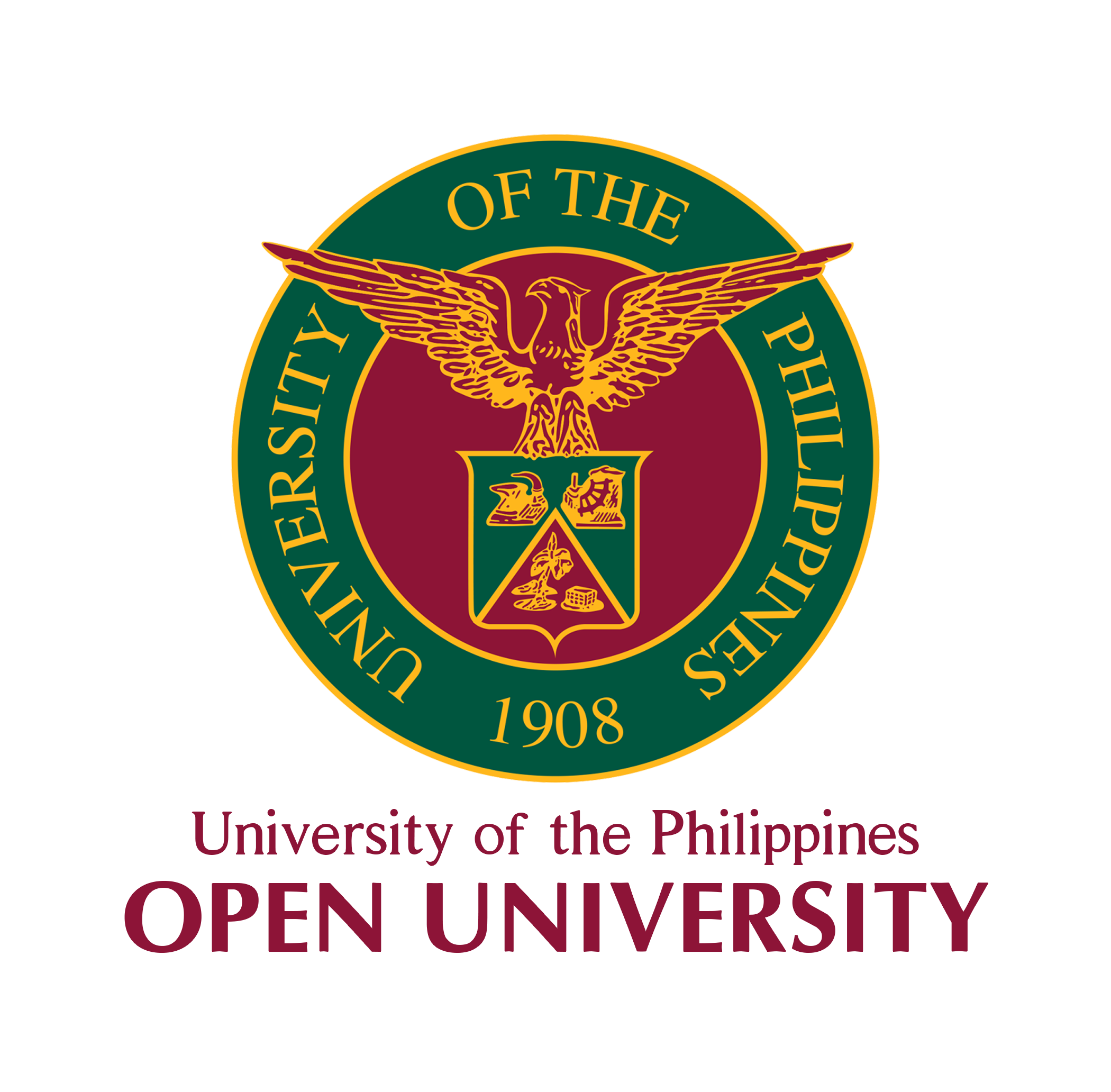
- Other names: UPOU, UP Open University
- Motto: Honor, Excellence, Service
- Type: National Public research university, Open university
- Established: February 23, 1995
- Academic affiliations: ICDE, AAOU, APRU, CODEPP
- Budget: ₱194.977 million (2019)
- Chancellor: Joane V. Serrano
- President: Angelo Jimenez
- Vice-Chancellor: Aurora V. Lacaste (Academic Affairs); Jean A. Saludadez (Finance and Administration)
- Total staff: 346 (2019)
- Students: 4,086 (2019)
- Undergraduates: 841 (2019)
- Postgraduates: 3,245 (2019)
- Location: Los Baños, Laguna, Philippines; 14°10′26.3″N 121°15′45.3″E
- Campus: Virtual campus
- Language: English
- Hymn: "U.P. Naming Mahal" ("U.P. Beloved")
- Colors: UP Maroon and UP Forest Green
- Website: www.upou.edu.ph/home/

- Location in Laguna Location in Luzon Location in the Philippines

The University of the Philippines Open University (UPOU) is a public research university and is the fifth constituent university of the University of the Philippines System.

UPOU was established in 1995 by the UP Board of Regents as the evolution of the UP Distance Education Program. As of 2019, UPOU had 4,086 students enrolled in various programs representing 7.3% of the student population of the entire University of the Philippines system. This makes it the 4th largest constituent university by student population after UP Manila, and just slightly more than UP Visayas, which had 7.2%, while having the smallest budget of any constituent university.

UPOU was declared the National Center of Excellence in Open Learning and Distance Education by the Commission on Higher Education and is the leader of the Consortium of Open Distance Education Providers in the Philippines (CODEPP) and a member of the International Council for Open and Distance Education (ICDE).

== History ==
University of the Philippines Open University was established on February 23, 1995, as the fifth constituent university of the University of the Philippines System. It is mandated by Republic Act No. 10650, also known as the Open and Distance Learning Act of 2014, to assist the Commission on Higher Education (CHED) and the Technical Education and Skills Development Authority (TESDA) in their open distance learning functions.

In 2024, UPOU earned higher education accreditation from the Asian Association of Open Universities.

== Academics ==
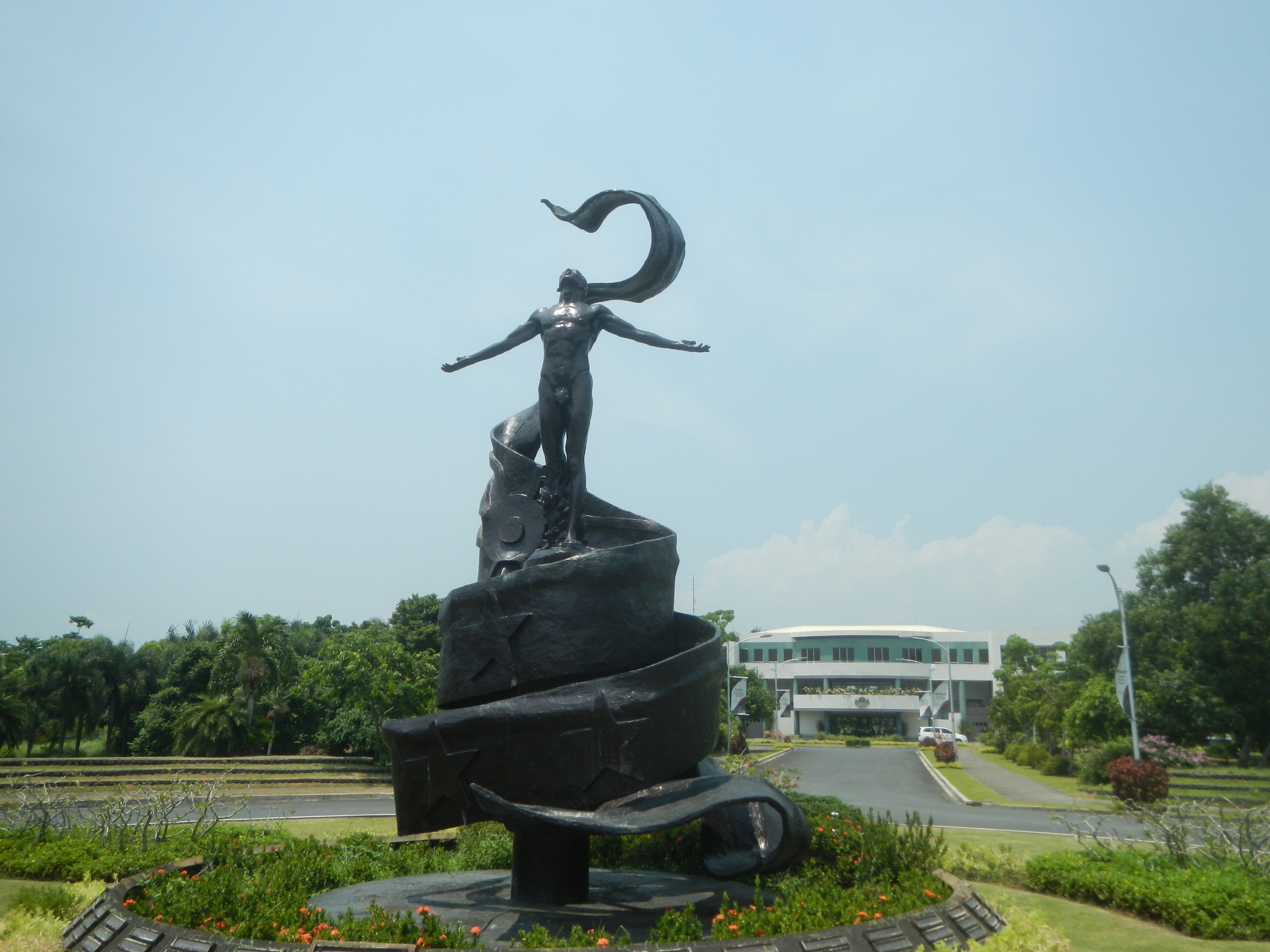
UP Open University Oblation

The UP Open University delivers its programs and courses through distance education (DE). Learners study through independent self-learning using specially designed learning materials and resources. Teaching and learning are mediated through the use of technology like print, audio, video and the internet. Students interact with their instructors and their peers through virtual classrooms, SMS, email, and web conferencing. Almost all courses are offered through online learning mode.

In January 2024, UPOU is offering free 24 Massive open online courses which cover various categories, including "ODeL teacher accreditation, child rights protection, technology for teaching and learning, educational media production, sustainable development, business analytics, introduction to distance education, and more."

UPOU offers accredited graduate and undergraduate degrees as well as diploma courses and Professional Teaching Certificates (PTC) to Filipino and international students in more than 70 countries.

== Headquarters ==
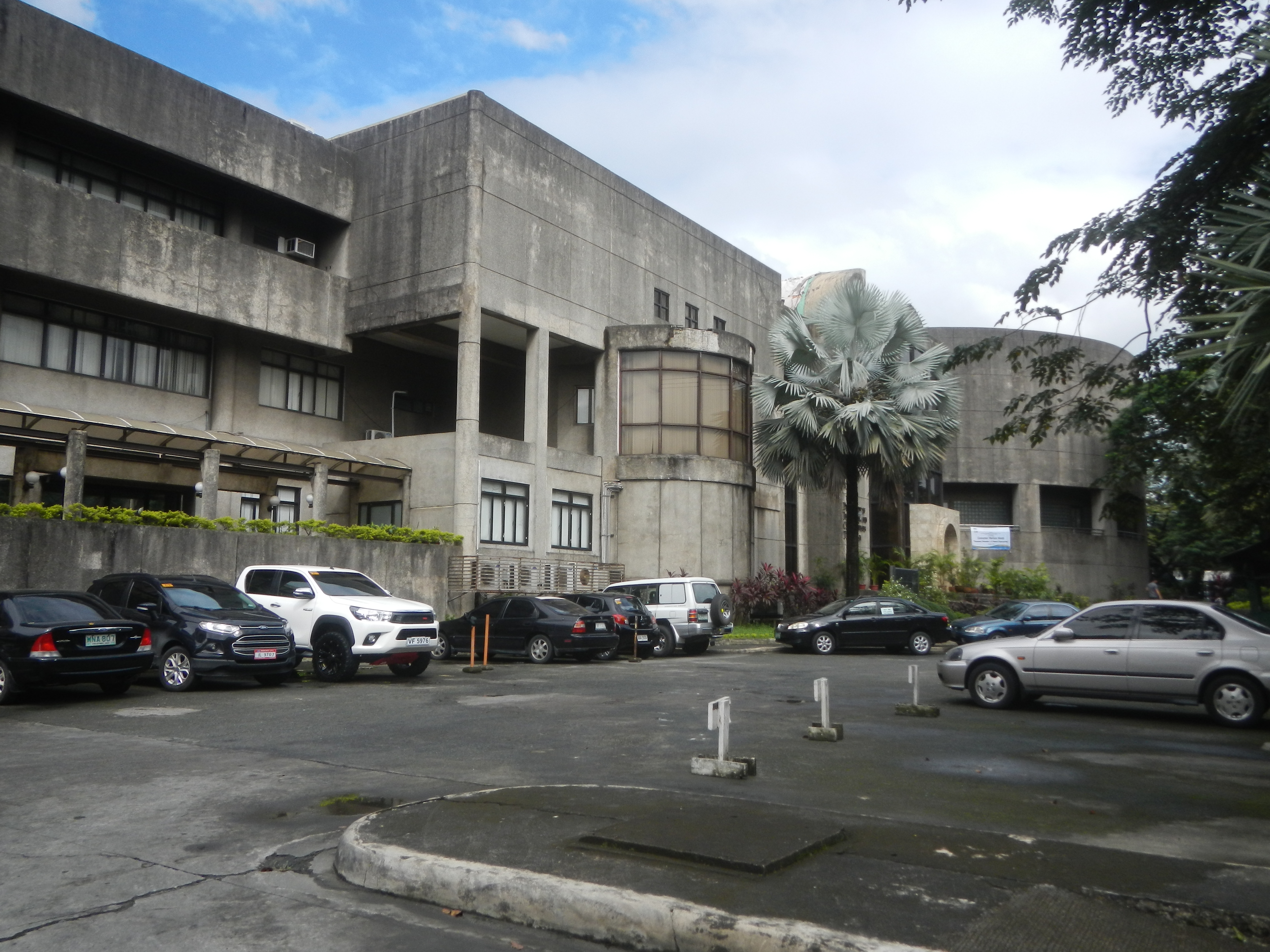
UPDiliman campus

The UP Open University Headquarters is located in Los Baños, Laguna, close to the International Rice Research Institute.

The university also maintains a satellite office at the National Computer Center Building in Diliman, Quezon City. In the future, the university will move to a new campus in New Clark City in Capas, Tarlac.

== Academic Affiliation ==
UPOU maintains membership in the follow local and international academic associations:

=== Local ===
- Philippine Society for Distance Learning (PSDL)
- Consortium of Open Distance Education Providers in the Philippines (CODEPP) – founding member and first chair
- Los Baños Science Community Foundation, Inc. (LBSCFI) – member since 2000

=== International ===
- International Council for Open and Distance Education (ICDE)
- Asian Association of Open Universities (AAOU)
- Association of Pacific Rim Universities (APRU)

== Notable alumni ==
- Jejomar Binay - Diploma in Environment and Natural Resource Management graduate. Former Mayor of Makati and former Vice President of the Philippines.
- Migz Zubiri - Graduate, Master in Environment and Natural Resources Management. Former Senate President of the Philippines and former Bukidnon 3rd district representative.
- Sarah Geronimo - Graduate, Associate in Arts. Singer.
- Cathy Untalan - Diploma in Environment and Natural Resource Management. Beauty pageant titleholder.

== See also ==
- List of open universities
- Virtual university
- Open learning
- Distance education
- University of the Philippines Baguio
- University of the Philippines Cebu
- University of the Philippines Diliman
- University of the Philippines Los Baños
- University of the Philippines Manila
- University of the Philippines Mindanao
- University of the Philippines Tacloban
- University of the Philippines Visayas

== Accessible Links ==
- UPOU MODeL
- UPOU Blog
- UPOU Ugnayan ng Pahinungód
- UP Vinta
- MyPortal
- Student Portal (AIMS)
