= University of the Philippines Visayas =

Public university in Miagao, Philippines

- Unibersidad ng Pilipinas Visayas (Filipino)
- Motto: Honor, Excellence, Service
- Type: National state university, research university
- Established: July 1, 1947; 79 years ago
- Academic affiliations: Association of Pacific Rim Universities; ASEAN European Academic University Network; ASEAN University Network
- Chancellor: Clement C. Camposano
- President: Angelo Jimenez
- Faculty: 380 (2023)
- Students: 3,267 (2024–25)
- Undergraduates: 2,647 (2024–25)
- Postgraduates: 620 (2024–25)
- Other students: 519 (High School) (2024-25)
- Location: Miagao, Iloilo (main campus); Iloilo City; 10°38′30.08″N 122°13′51.65″E
- Campus: Suburban
- Hymn: "U.P. Naming Mahal" ("U.P. Beloved")
- Colors: UP Maroon UP Forest Green
- Nickname: Fighting Maroons
- Sporting affiliations: State Colleges and Universities Athletic Association (SCUAA)
- Website: upv.edu.ph
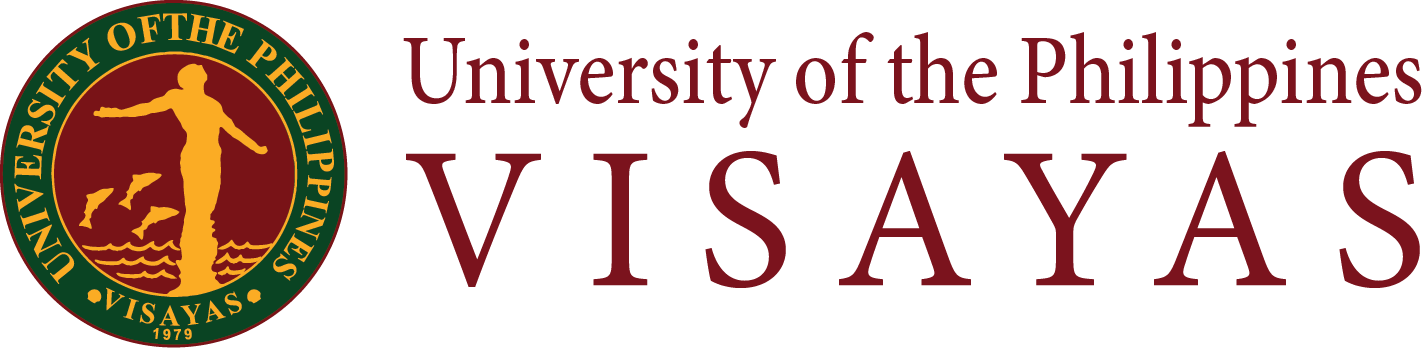

- Location in the Visayas Location in the Philippines

The University of the Philippines Visayas (UPV or UP Visayas) is a public research university and the third autonomous constituent of the University of the Philippines System in the province of Iloilo, Philippines.

UP Visayas traces its origins back to the University of the Philippines Iloilo College (UPIC), which opened in 1947 as the first UP campus in Iloilo City following World War II, offering high school and early college courses. In response to the need for a specialized center for fisheries and marine science education in the Visayas, the UP Board of Regents approved the establishment of the University of the Philippines in the Visayas on 31 May 1979, consolidating several UP units with its main campus in Miagao, Iloilo. This name was later updated to University of the Philippines Visayas.

UP Visayas has two campuses—Miagao and Iloilo City — with Miagao being the main campus where the central administration offices are located.

Most of the students of the university are drawn from the Visayas and the Visayan linguistic groups. Many of the leaders of the Visayas graduated from UPV or its predecessor institutions. As of 2007, the Commission on Higher Education of the Philippines awarded four National Centers of Excellence and Development to UPV including Fisheries (UPV-Miagao), Marine Science (UPV-Miagao), and Biology (UPV-Miagao).

== History ==
=== Establishment ===
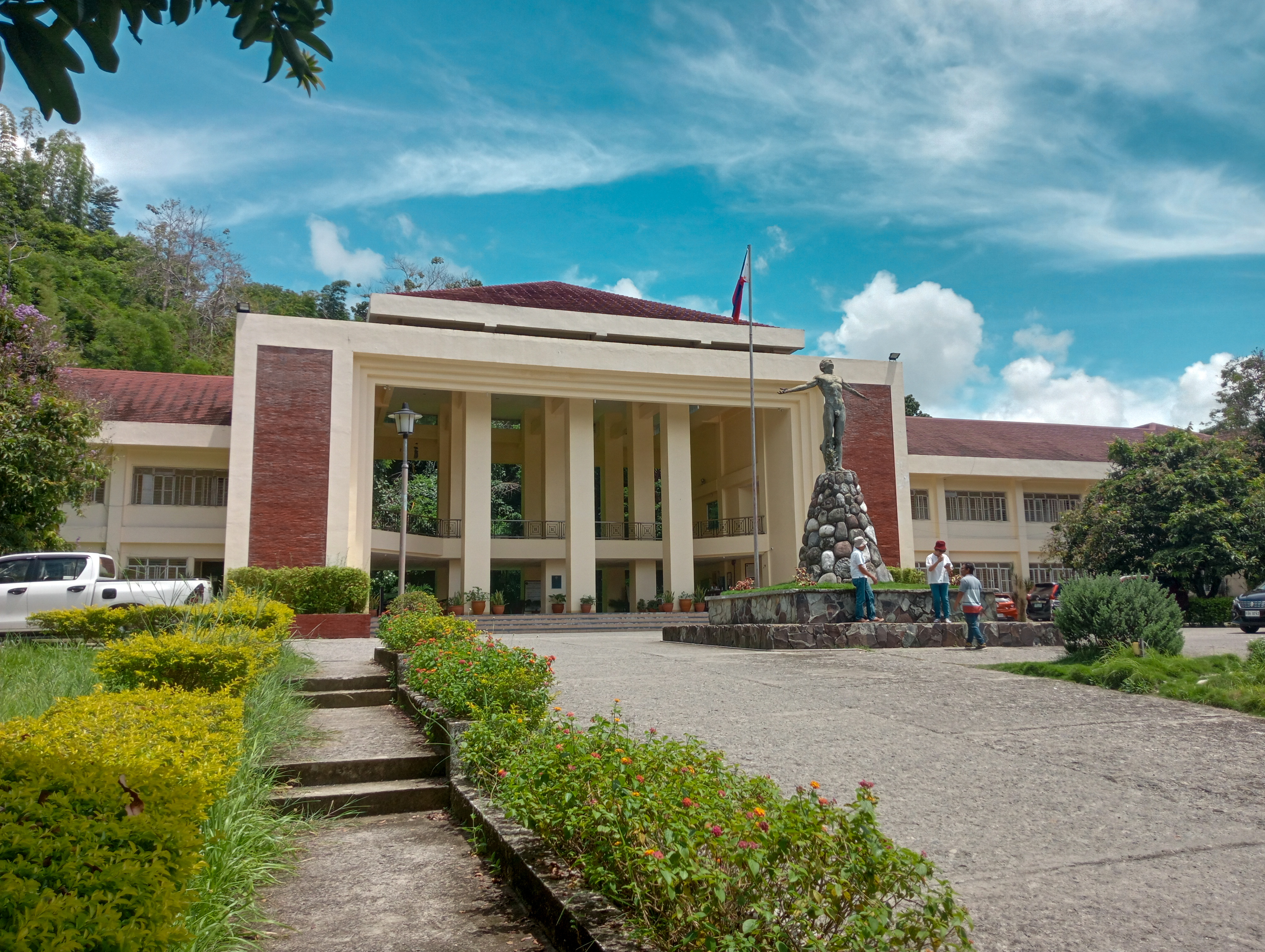
Administration Building

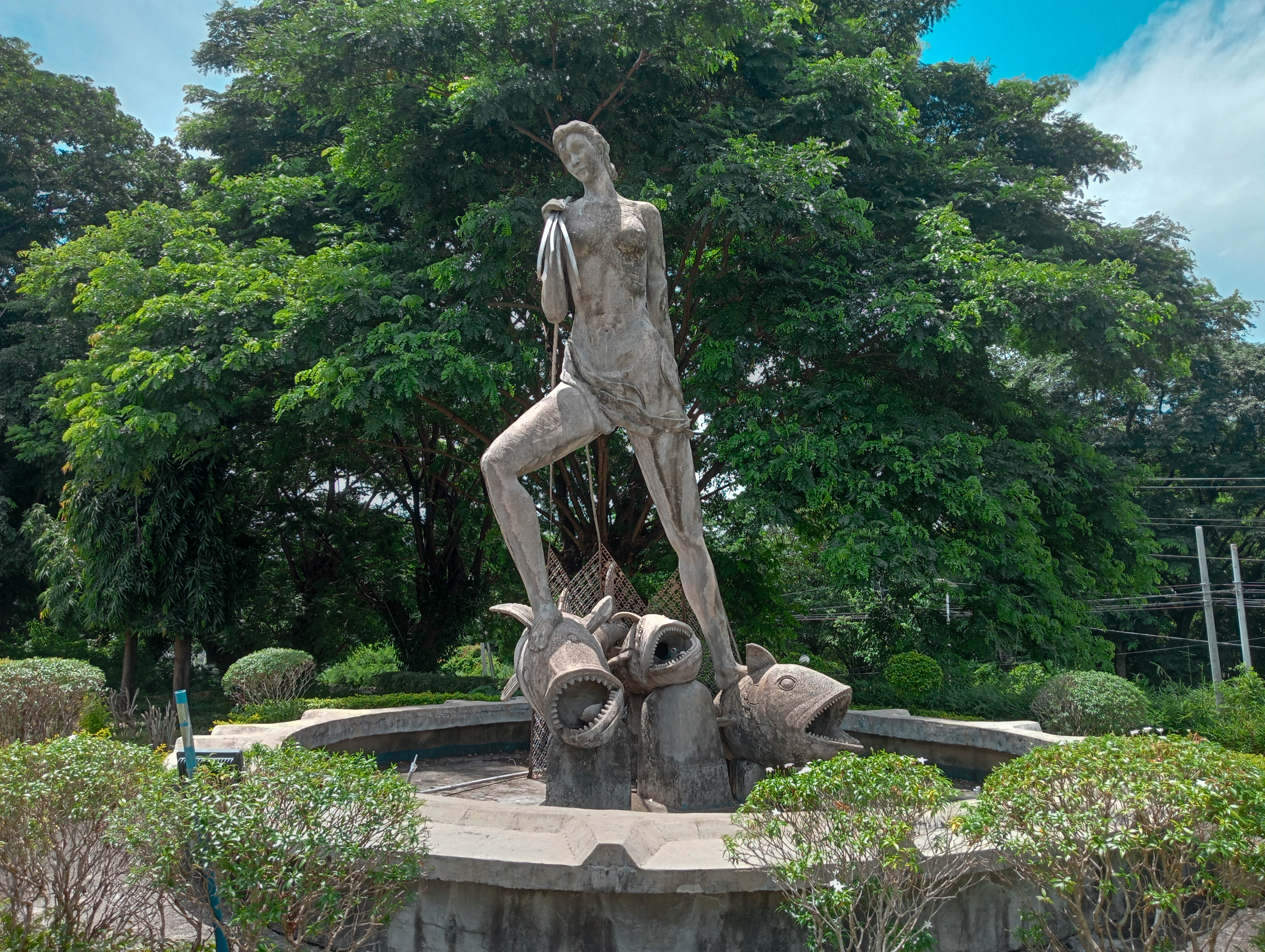
Diwata ng Dagat Monument

UPV was created by merging four UP colleges: UP College of Fisheries founded in 1944; UP Cebu founded in 1918, UP Iloilo founded in 1947, and UP Tacloban founded in 1973. When the Miagao campus was established, many of the academic programs offered in the Iloilo City campus were moved there. To this day, the faculty, staff and students travel between the Iloilo City and Miagao campuses.

During the term of UP President Onofre D. Corpuz in 1975 an interdisciplinary team within the university conceived of an autonomous unit which would become an institution for fisheries and marine science education and research. The idea was fleshed out in a proposal entitled "Education Development Plan for the University of the Philippines in the Visayas", a six-volume report by the interdisciplinary team. The new university would evolve from the UP College of Iloilo and the College of Fisheries in Diliman, which would transfer to its new site in the Visayas. Funding was to come partly from a government loan, to be negotiated with the World Bank for the development of fisheries education.

On September 21, 1977, President Ferdinand E. Marcos issued Presidential Decree 1200, known as the Philippine Five-Year Development Plan (1978–1982), which provides, among others, that Region VI would be the site of the University of the Philippines in the Visayas (UPV) with emphasis on fisheries and marine sciences. A second UPV Project Development Team was then organized in December 1977 to review and update the plans. The development plan was approved by the UP Board of Regents on May 28, 1978. The fisheries educational loan was then re-negotiated with the World Bank inasmuch as its appraisal team had earlier favorably endorsed the development plan.

On May 31, 1979, the Board of Regents approved the establishment of the University of the Philippines in the Visayas as an autonomous unit of the University of the Philippines System with its 1,294-hectare (3,200-acre) main campus in Miagao, Iloilo. It would start with two colleges, the UP College Iloilo as its College of Arts and Sciences and the College of Fisheries as its flagship college.

Through the Sixth Educational Loan of the Philippine Government approved by the World Bank in January 1980, the development of the UPV flagship college was made possible.

On February 29, 1980, the groundbreaking of the UPV site in Miagao was held. On June 26, 1980, Executive Order No. 628 of President Ferdinand E. Marcos operationalized UPV, and Dr. Dionisia A. Rola was appointed the first Chancellor, becoming the first ever woman Chancellor in the history of UP.

The development of the site and construction of facilities began in September 1981 and was made possible through the Sixth Educational Loan. The loan of about $18 million was used for site acquisition, construction of buildings, procurement of equipment, and the transfer of the College of Fisheries personnel and other property from Diliman to Miagao.

=== Reorganization and Expansion ===
Originally, UPV consisted of two colleges - the College of Fisheries and the College of Arts and Sciences, formerly UP College Iloilo.

On April 30, 1987, the Board of Regents approved the reorganization of the College of Fisheries (now the College of Fisheries and Ocean Sciences or CFOS) and the establishment of four institutes, namely, the Institute of Aquaculture, the Institute of Marine Fisheries and Oceanology, Institute of Fish Processing Technology, and the Institute of Fisheries Policy and Development Studies. The Brackishwater Aquaculture Center facilities in Leganes, Iloilo became the Brackishwater Aquaculture Research Station of IA.

In May 1988, the College of Fisheries transferred to the new site in Miagao under the leadership of Chancellor Rogelio O. Juliano and Dean Efren Ed. C. Flores. The Diliman-based programs of the College of Fisheries were then relocated to its present site together with most of its faculty and staff.

In January 1990, the School of Technology transferred to the Miagao Campus. In June of the same year, Chancellor Francisco Nemenzo effected the transfer of the Division of Humanities and the Division of Social Sciences of the College of Arts and Sciences.

In May 1993, the transfer of the Division of Physical Sciences and Mathematics and the Division of Biological Sciences, along with the Office of the Dean, completed the transfer of the CAS.

=== Independence of regional units ===
On September 24, 2010, the UP Board of Regents elevated the status of UP Cebu as an autonomous unit, in preparation for its constituent university status after five to seven years. It eventually became a constituent university on October 27, 2016. UP Tacloban followed suit, becoming an autonomous college, no longer under UP Visayas' purview, on April 27, 2023. With its former regional units now independent, UP Visayas now only has campuses in Panay Island.

Two degree-granting units remain on the Iloilo City Campus. They are the College of Management, and the CAS Division of Professional Education. Also on campus is the U.P. High School in Iloilo (formerly U.P.V. High School). The High School is an experimental laboratory for innovative teaching strategies designed to provide academic training for underprivileged students in order to better prepare them for access to tertiary education in the University of the Philippines.

Some units have remained on the Iloilo City Campus:

- the Center for West Visayan Studies (CWVS),
- Office of Continuing Education and Pahinungód (OCEP),
- Sentro ng Wikang Filipino (SWF),
- Graduate Program Office (GPO),
- UPV Language Program (LP),
- UPV Gender and Development Program (GDP).

== Administration ==
Chancellors of the
University of the Philippines Visayas
Dr. Dionisia A. Rola, 1980–1987
Dr. Rogelio O. Juliano, 1987–1989
Dr. Francisco A. Nemenzo Jr., 1989–1992
Dr. Flor J. Lacanilao, 1992–1993
Dr. Arsenio S. Camacho,1993–1998
Dr. Ida M. Siason, 1998–2005
Dr. Glenn D. Aguilar, 2005–2008
Dr. Minda J. Formacion, 2008–2011
Dr. Rommel A. Espinosa, 2011–2017
Dr. Ricardo P. Babaran, 2017–2020
Dr. Clement C. Camposano, 2020–Present

UPV was established as the third constituent university of the University of the Philippines. The University of the Philippines is governed by the Board of Regents' 11 members, of whom five are ex officio, three are student, faculty, and staff representatives, and three are appointed by the President of the Philippines. Each campus of the University of the Philippines is headed by a chancellor.

== Degree-granting units ==
=== UP Visayas - Miagao Campus (Main) ===
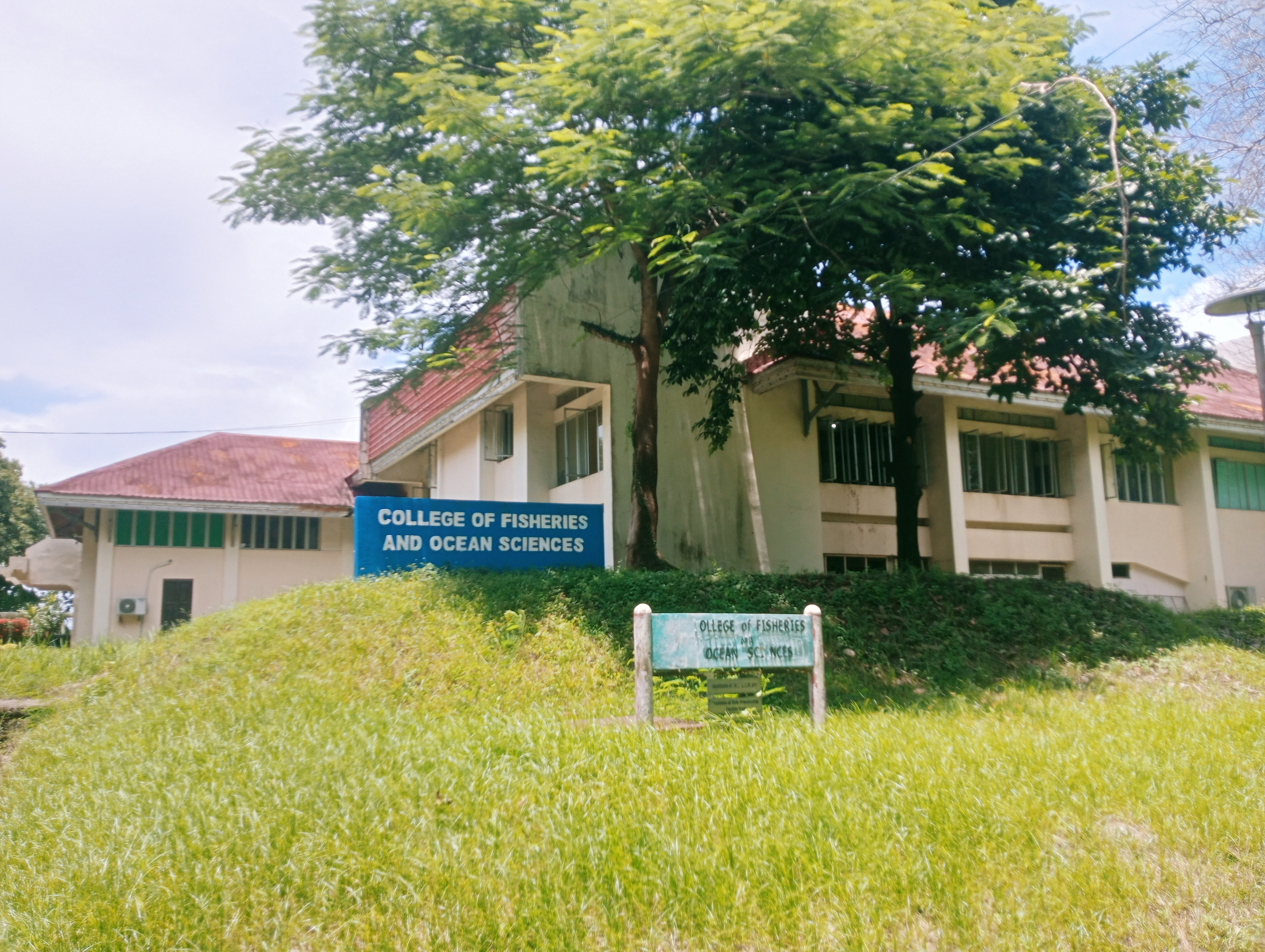
Pidlaoan Hall (College of Fisheries and Ocean Sciences)

==== College of Fisheries and Ocean Sciences (formerly the College of Fisheries) ====
The College of Fisheries and Ocean Sciences (CFOS) of the University of the Philippines Visayas gives fisheries education. The college has instituted degree programs that address the need for sustainable development of the country's fisheries resources and respond to the call for highly trained manpower in the field, at graduate and undergraduate level.

The College of Fisheries and Ocean Sciences has four institutes: the Institute of Aquaculture, the Institute of Fish Processing Technology, the Institute of Marine Fisheries and Oceanology, and the Institute of Fisheries Policy and Development Studies. It offers programs in Undergraduate — B.S. Fisheries; Graduate — Master of Aquaculture, M.S. Fisheries with majors in Aquaculture, Fisheries Biology, and Fish Processing Technology, and M.S. in Post-harvest Fisheries; and Ph.D. in Aquaculture.

Institute of Aquaculture
The Institute of Aquaculture (IA) focuses on aquaculture research, development, and extension, providing facilities for cultivating commercially important aquatic organisms. It's a cornerstone for sustainable aquaculture, with diverse stations and hatcheries vital for both fundamental and applied research. Key facilities include the Multi-species Hatchery and Freshwater Aquaculture Station on the Miagao Campus, the 15-hectare Brackishwater Aquaculture Center (BAC) in Leganes, Iloilo, and the Batan Mariculture Station in Batan, Aklan, which supports open-water mariculture.

Institute of Marine Fisheries and Oceanology
The Institute of Marine Fisheries and Oceanography (IMFO) delivers academic programs, research, and extension in capture fisheries and ocean sciences, utilizing facilities for comprehensive marine studies. These include Laboratories for Marine Biology and Oceanography, equipped for studying marine organisms, ecosystems, and oceanographic parameters. The institute leverages Coastal and Marine Environments for practical training and research. Furthermore, the Data Analysis and GIS Facilities support advanced research in areas such as fish stock assessment and marine resource management.

Institute of Fish Processing Technology
The Institute of Fish Processing Technology (IFPT) leads in post-harvest fisheries through instruction, research, and public service focused on value addition and food safety. It houses essential facilities, including the Seafood Processing Plant and Laboratory, as well as microbiology and chemistry labs for quality control, and solar drying and shellfish depuration units. IFPT is known for developing innovative fishery products and promoting sustainable processing methods. Through Fishtek, it bridges academic research with industry, helping uplift local fisheries and coastal livelihoods.

Institute of Fisheries Policy and Development Studies
The Institute of Fisheries Policy and Development Studies (IFPDS) is dedicated to generating expertise in fisheries policy and development. It conducts research and offers training and extension programs vital for informed decision-making and sustainable management of aquatic resources. Its facilities include the Fisheries Policy Laboratory, launched in March 2025, which supports teaching, research, and public service by providing tools for data collection and facilitating policy co-design.

==== College of Arts and Sciences ====
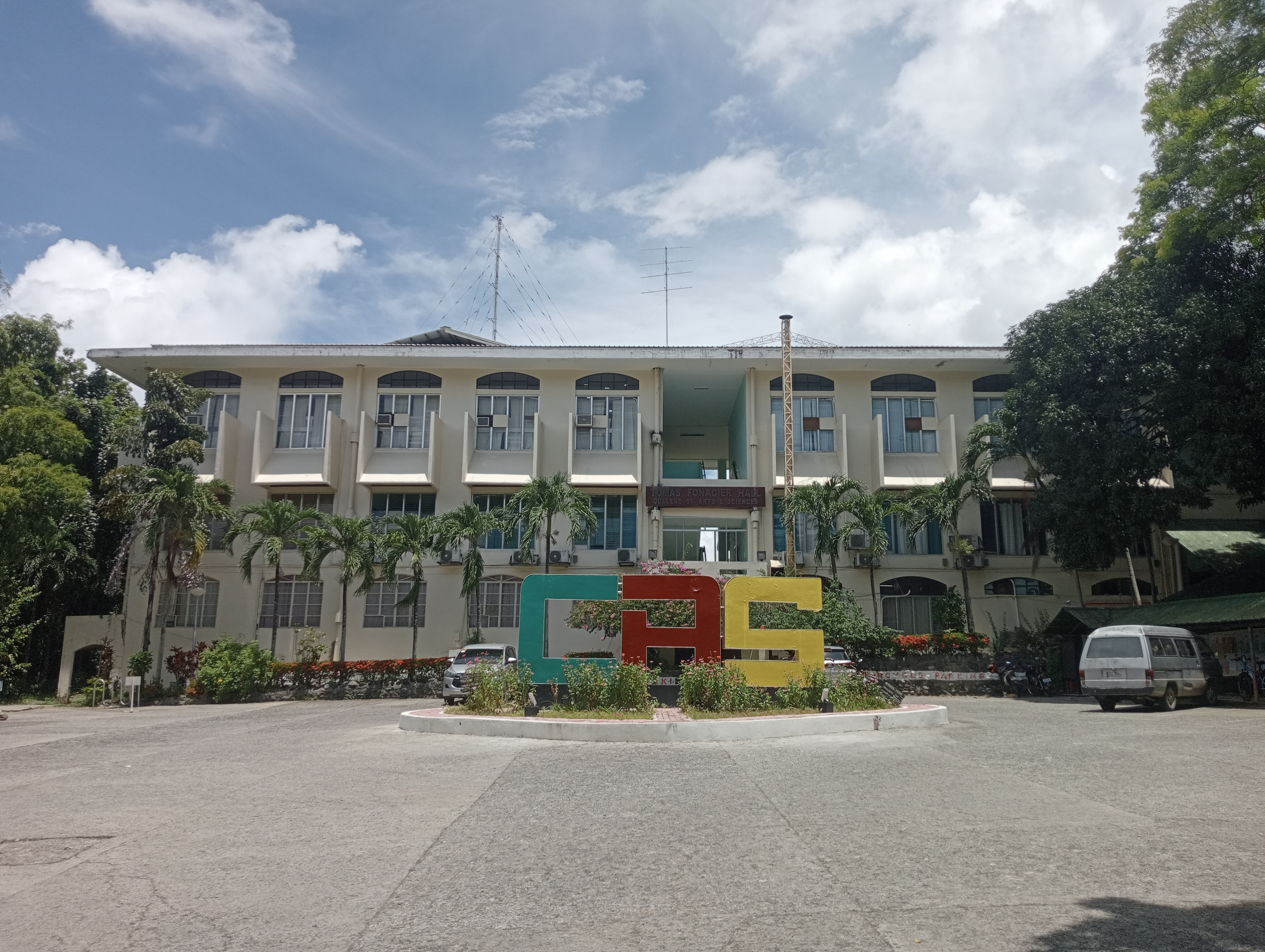
Tomas Fonacier Hall (College of Arts and Sciences)

The College of Arts and Sciences (CAS) provides the general education program that is the foundation of all academic programs in the university. The college equips the students with basic knowledge in the natural sciences, social sciences and humanities. It offers interdisciplinary programs with double major supportive of, or complementary to, those offered by other colleges.

The college has a Division of Professional Education and a laboratory high school designed to train underprivileged youth especially from rural areas.

The College of Arts and Sciences has five divisions: the Biological Sciences, Humanities, Social Sciences, Physical Sciences and Mathematics, and Professional Education. The Professional Education Division offers the following programs: Master of Education in Biology, Chemistry, English as a Second Language, Guidance, Mathematics, Filipino as a Second Language, Reading, Social Studies, and Physics. An M.S. Biology is also offered by the Division of Biological Sciences. The academic programs of CAS are the following: Undergraduate (Baccalaureate) — Bachelor of Arts in Communication and Media Studies, Community Development, Literature, History, Political Science, Psychology, Sociology; Bachelor of Science in Applied Mathematics, Statistics, Computer Science, Economics, Biology, Chemistry, and Public Health.

==== School of Technology ====
The School of Technology (SoTech), formerly the School of Technology and Environmental Resources (STER), was established on March 29, 1984, as the fifth degree-granting unit of UP in the Visayas during the 966th Meeting of the Board of Regents. It was formally operationalized on February 17, 1986, with the transfer of the Food Technology program, along with its faculty, from the College of Arts and Sciences.

On April 22, 1993, the name of the school was changed from STER to SoTech.

The school provide trained manpower, generates environment-friendly technologies, disseminate information and transfer knowledge and technology; and assist in the proper management of the environment.

The School of Technology offers B.S. Food Technology, B.S. Chemical Engineering and the Certificate in Environmental Resource Management (CERM) with specialization in Coastal Resource Management, Watershed Management, and Environmental Technology.

=== UP Visayas - Iloilo City Campus ===
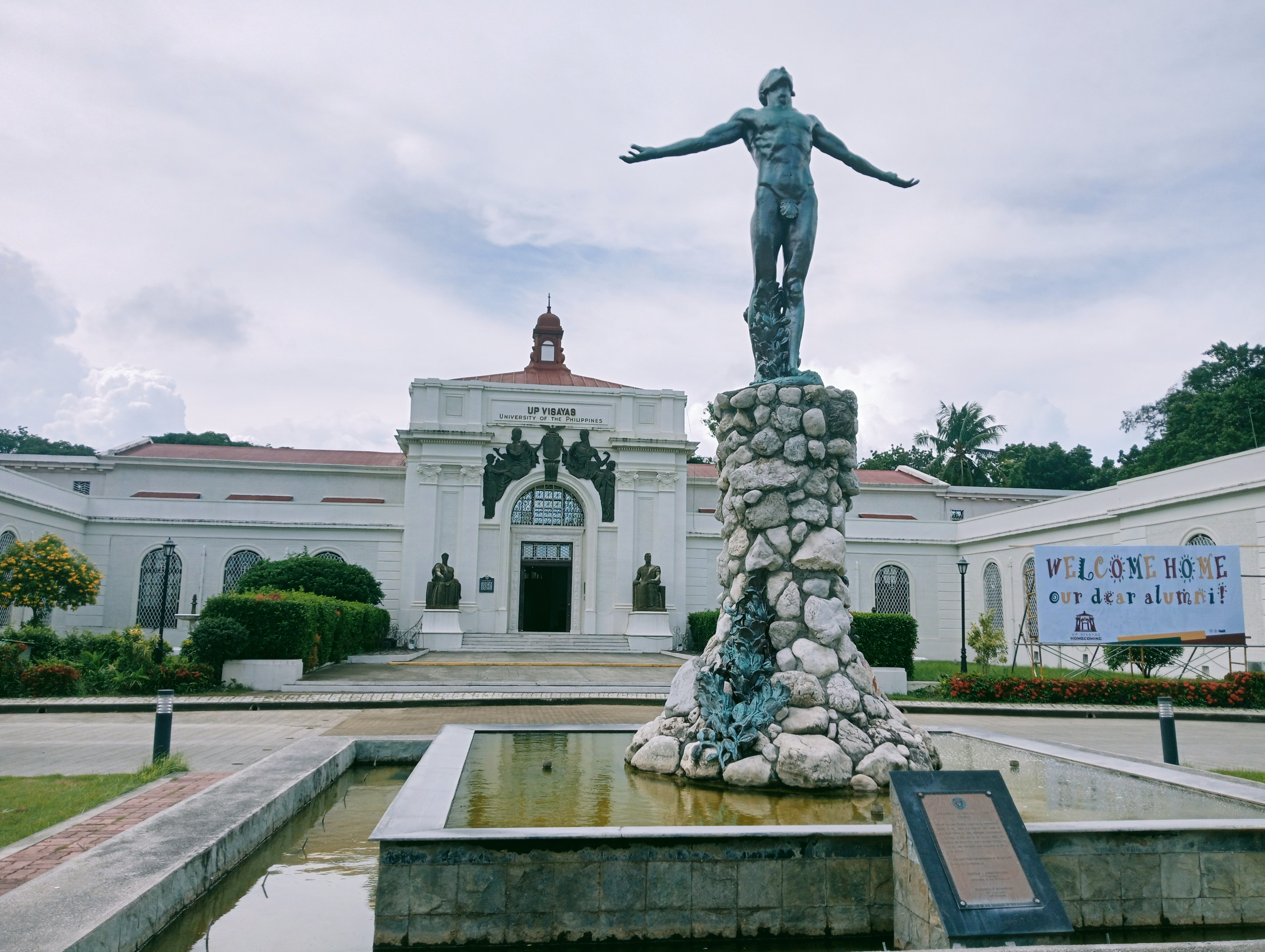
The UPV Main Building in Iloilo City campus, which formerly served as the Iloilo City Hall.

The College of Management was formerly the School of Development Management, established in December 1981 out of the former Division of Development Management of the College of Arts and Sciences. SDM was elevated to college status in 1991.

The objectives of the college are to support the UPV programs in fisheries, marine sciences, the arts, social and natural sciences; to provide management education in order to train leaders for the region's public and private sectors; to serve as center for research, information dissemination, consultancy, and training services in administration/management; and to serve as a link between UPV and local, national, and international organizations engaged in management education, training and research.

The College of Management has two departments, namely, the Department of Accounting and the Department of Management. It offers the following academic programs: Undergraduate — B.S. Accountancy, B.S. Business Administration (Marketing), and B.S. Management; Graduate — Master of Management in Business Management, Public Management, Rural Development Management, and Tax Management.

Starting June 1997, the college offered the Diploma Program in Urban and Regional Planning in coordination with the School of Urban and Regional Planning at UP Diliman.

In July 1997, CM started the pilot testing of a course on Island Food Systems in RDM 298 (Field Studies), a course in the Master of Management, Rural Development Program. The initiative was made under the auspices of the Island Sustainability, Livelihood, and Equity (ISLE) Program. ISLE partners from Canada, Indonesia, and Jamaica team-taught the course with UPV faculty members.

In 2014, CM offered extension classes for Master of Management in Roxas City, Capiz at the Pueblo de Panay which is located in the city.

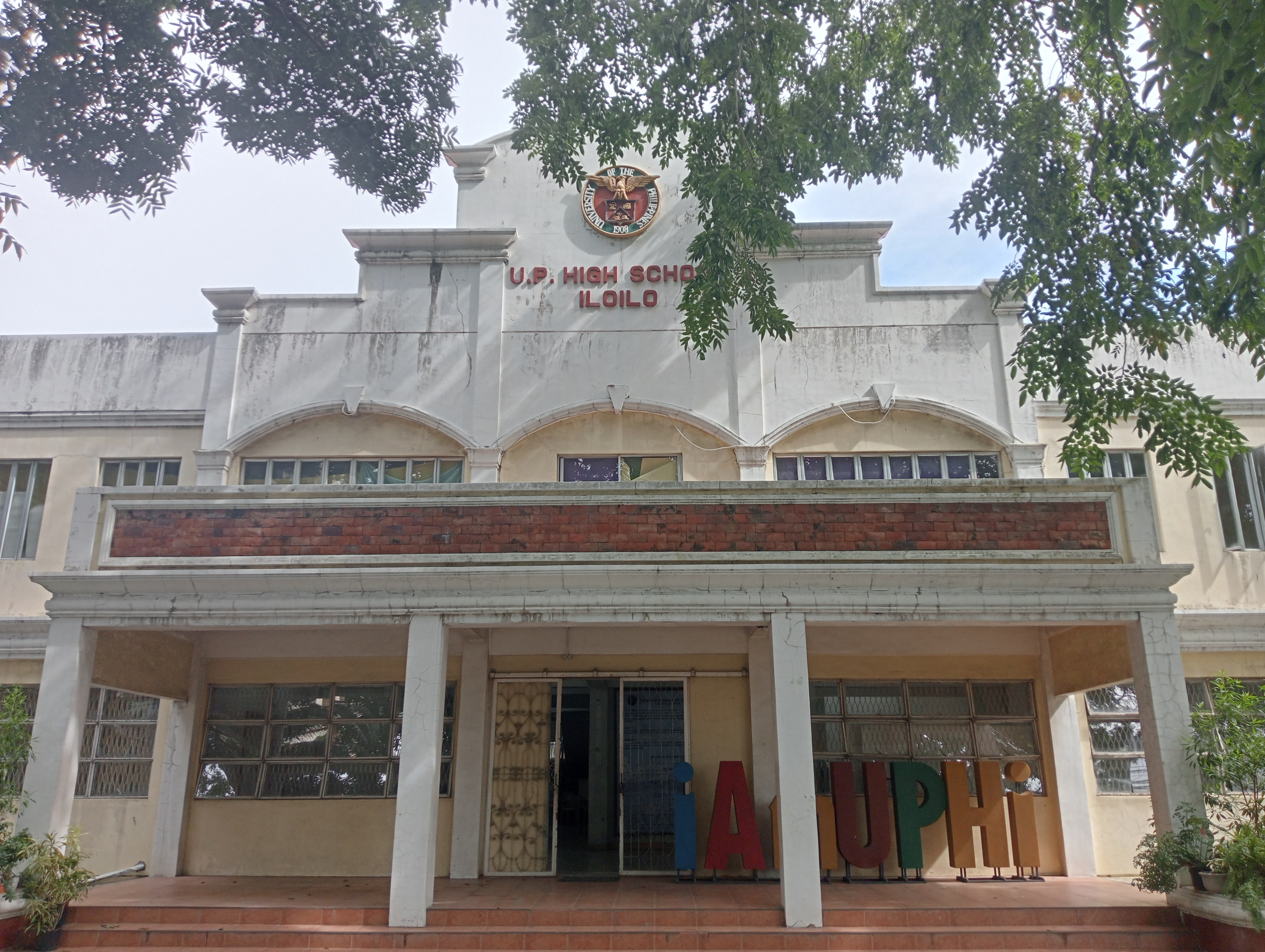
U.P. High School in Iloilo

Also found in UPV Iloilo campus is the University of the Philippines High School in Iloilo.

In 2022, the UP College of Law in Manila opened a law extension program on the Iloilo City campus.

In April 2022, The UPV Graduate Program Office (UPV-GPO) has been elevated to the UPV Graduate School (GS) by the UP Board of Regents (BOR).

== UP Visayas University Student Council ==
The University Student Council of UP Visayas is the highest governing student body in the university.

== Notable people ==
This list includes current and former faculty members, notable graduates, non-graduate former students, and current students of the University of the Philippines Visayas. Graduates of what are now the University of the Philippines Cebu and the University of the Philippines Tacloban prior to their elevation as autonomous universities are also considered alumni of UP Visayas.

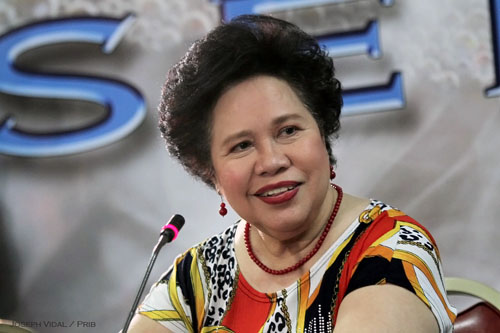
Senator Miriam Defensor Santiago earned her BA degree in Political Science in 1965, graduating magna cum laude.

- Josette Biyo (B.S. Biology) – International award-winning science teacher; executive director of the Philippine Science High School System from 2011 to 2014; an asteroid has been named after her by the Lincoln Near-Earth Asteroid Research project.
- Camilo Cascolan (M.P.A. 1995) – Chief of the Philippine National Police from September to November 2020.
- Arthur Defensor Sr. (A.A. 1959) – Governor of Iloilo from 1992 to 2001 and again from 2010 to 2019; member of the House of Representatives from 2001 to 2010.
- Franklin Drilon (High school 1961) – Lawyer and politician. Senator from 1995 to 2007 and again from 2010 to 2022, and Senate President three times.
- Pablo Fernandez (Pre-med student ca. late 1960s) – Student leader and UPROTC Corps Commander honored at the Bantayog ng mga Bayani; commissioned after graduation as an army reserve 2nd Lieutenant of the UP ROTC, but refusing to be assigned to Mindanao, instead founded the Federation of Ilonggo Students (FIST) and the Makabayang Samahan ng mga Propesyunal (MasangProp) to protest the abuses of the Marcos dictatorship. Captured, tortured, and bled to death by the Marcos regime in January 1973.
- Francis Jardeleza (B.A. Political Science 1970) – Associate Justice of the Supreme Court from 2014 to 2019; Solicitor General of the Philippines from 2012 to 2014
- Raoul Manuel (B.S. Applied Mathematics 2015, summa cum laude) – Youth activist and politician; member of the House of Representatives for Kabataan since 2022; UPV's first summa cum laude.
- Francisco Nemenzo Jr. (Chancellor, 1989–1992) – Political scientist, educator, and activist; President of the University of the Philippines from 1999 to 2005.
- Peter Solis Nery (B.S. Biology 1990; editor of Pagbutlak) – Poet, playwright, & author; Palanca Awards Hall of Fame Awardee
- Miriam Defensor Santiago (B.A. Political Science 1965, magna cum laude) – Senator from 1995 to 2001 and again from 2004 to 2016; Judge of the International Criminal Court from 2012 to 2014; Secretary of Agrarian Reform from 1989 to 1990
- Myrtle Sarrosa (B.S. Accountancy undergrad, transferred to UP Diliman) – actress, cosplayer, host, and singer-songwriter; winner of Pinoy Big Brother: Teen Edition 4

== See also ==
- University of the Philippines Baguio
- University of the Philippines Cebu
- University of the Philippines Diliman
- University of the Philippines Los Baños
- University of the Philippines Manila
- University of the Philippines Mindanao
- University of the Philippines Open University
- University of the Philippines Tacloban
