= Guillermo Tolentino =

Filipino sculptor (1890–1976)

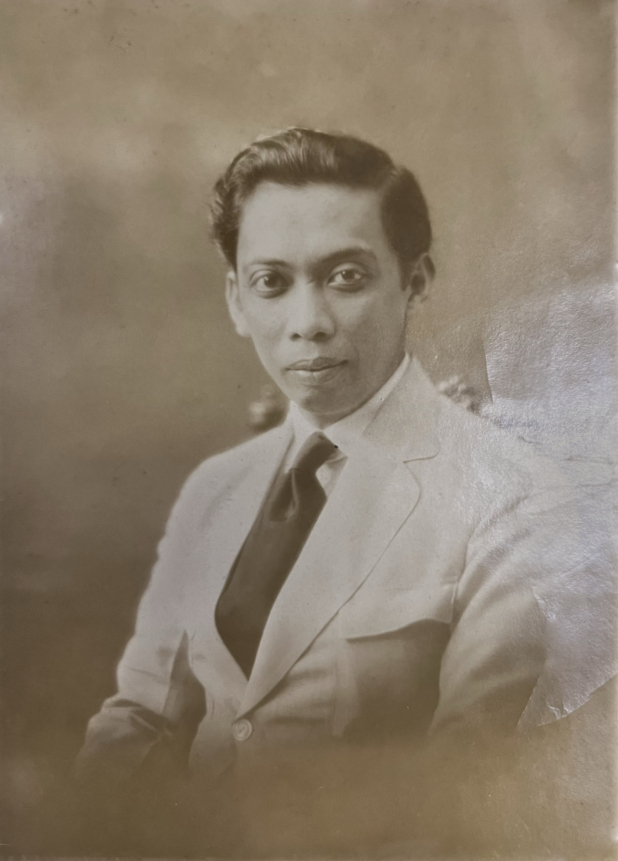
- Tolentino in 1952
- Born: July 24, 1890; Malolos, Bulacan, Captaincy General of the Philippines
- Died: July 12, 1976 (aged 85); Quezon City, Third Republic of the Philippines
- Resting place: Libingan ng mga Bayani; 14.520°N 121.044°E
- Education: University of the Philippines
- Notable work: Bonifacio Monument; UP Oblation
- Style: Classicism
- Awards: National Artist of the Philippines

Guillermo Estrella Tolentino (July 24, 1890 – July 12, 1976) was a Filipino sculptor and professor at the University of the Philippines (UP). He worked primarily in the classical style and was named a National Artist of the Philippines for Sculpture in 1973.

After graduating from UP with a degree in fine arts in 1915 and later returning from studies in Europe, Tolentino opened a studio in Manila and began a long academic career at his alma mater, eventually serving as the director of its School of Fine Arts. He is known for creating two prominent public monuments in the Philippines: the Bonifacio Monument, which commemorates the figures of the Philippine Revolution, and the Oblation, a bronze-painted concrete statue that serves as the symbol of the University of the Philippines. His early work also includes the widely distributed 1911 lithograph "Grupo de Filipinos Ilustres."

In addition to large-scale monuments, Tolentino sculpted busts of national figures and designed the Ramon Magsaysay Award medals. During his career, he received several awards, including the UNESCO Cultural Award in Sculpture and the Presidential Medal of Merit. Following his death in 1976, he was interred at the Libingan ng mga Bayani.

== Early life and education ==
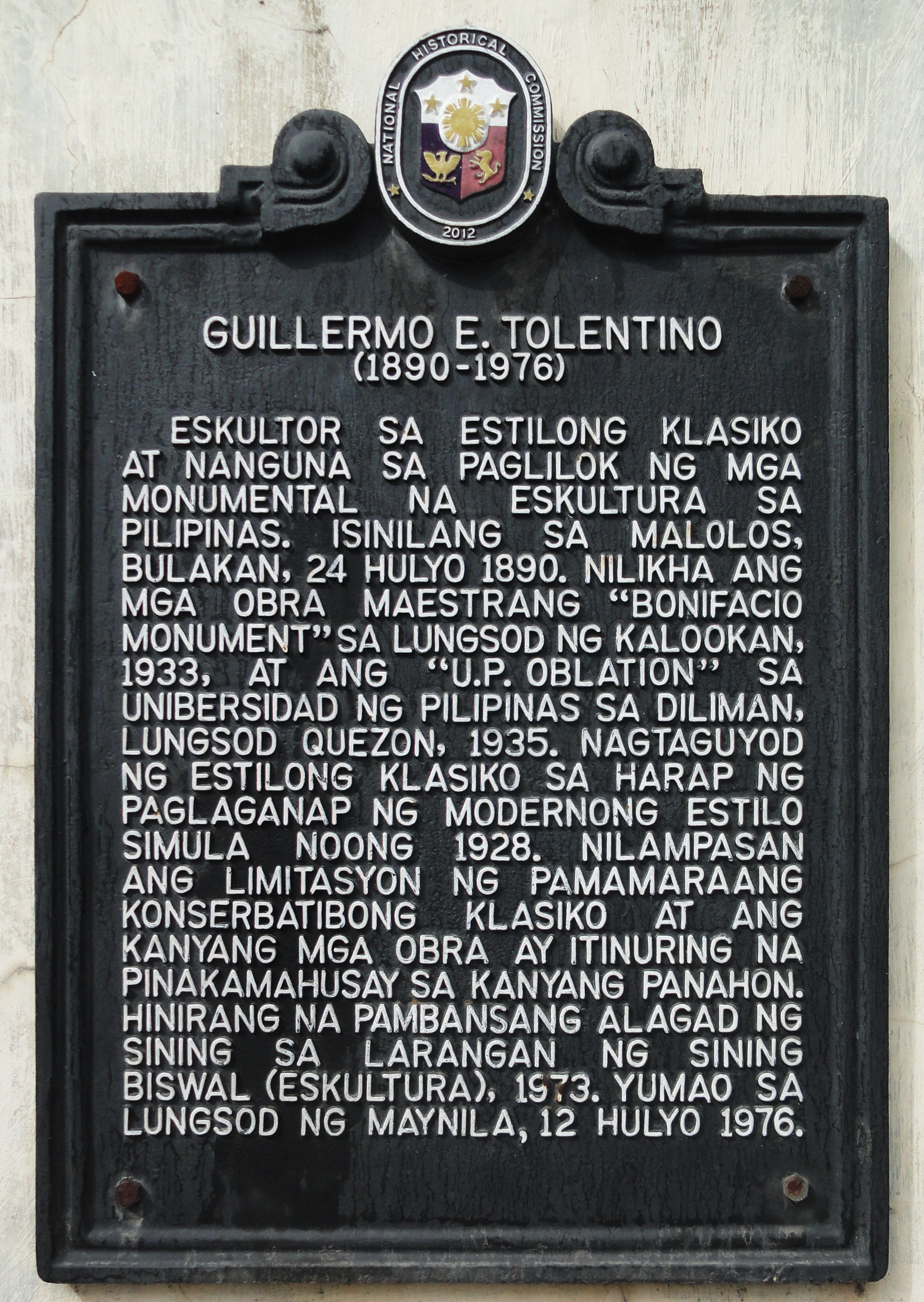
Historical marker installed in Malolos, Bulacan

Tolentino was born on July 24, 1890, in Malolos, Bulacan. He was the fourth of eight children. Before developing an interest in sculpture, he learned to play the guitar, a skill he acquired from his father. Young Tolentino showed an early talent for sculpting, molding figures of horses and dogs out of clay.

Tolentino attended Malolos Intermediate School and completed his high school education in the same city. He then moved to Manila to attend the School of Fine Arts at the University of the Philippines.

In 1911, Tolentino created an illustration of prominent Filipinos posing for a studio portrait, which included national heroes, revolutionaries, and politicians. The illustration was lithographed and published in the weekly magazine Liwayway under the title "Grupo de Filipinos Ilustres" and became popular in Filipino homes during the 20th century. Although Tolentino was a university student when he made the illustration and received no financial compensation for the popular work, he reportedly did not mind.

Tolentino graduated in 1915 with a degree in fine arts.

== Career ==
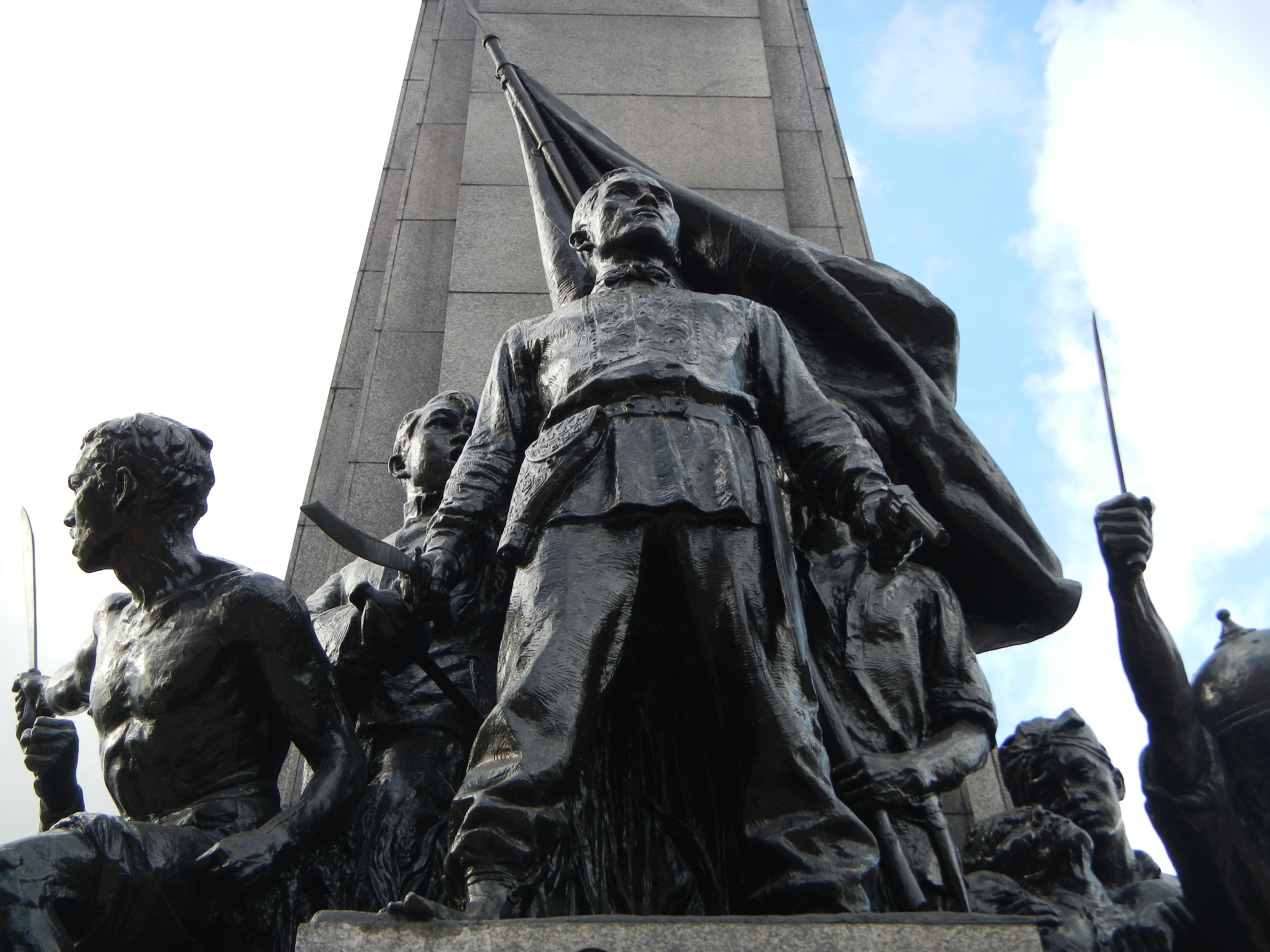
Detail of Tolentino's statues of Bonifacio and the Katipuneros

Upon returning from Europe in 1925, Tolentino was appointed professor at the University of the Philippines' School of Fine Arts and opened his Manila studio on January 24 of that year.

In 1930, Tolentino entered a competition to design the Bonifacio Monument alongside thirteen other artists. Rather than relying solely on printed materials, he interviewed participants of the Philippine Revolution. For anatomical accuracy, Bonifacio's figure was based on the bone structure of Espiridiona Bonifacio, the Supremo's surviving sister. The committee selected the winning designs on July 29; Tolentino's entry won first prize and a cash award of 3,000 pesos.

In 1935, University of the Philippines President Rafael Palma commissioned Tolentino to sculpt the Oblation, a statue inspired by the second stanza of Jose Rizal's Mi ultimo adios. Tolentino sculpted the piece in concrete and painted it to resemble bronze. His assistant, Anastacio Caedo, served as the primary model, while the physical proportions were adapted from Tolentino's brother-in-law, Virgilio Raymundo.

On October 25, 1935, the University of the Philippines Alumni Association requested that Tolentino design a commemorative arch for the inauguration of the Commonwealth of the Philippines. However, the project was never built due to the outbreak of war.

During Fernando Amorsolo's absence, Tolentino was appointed acting director of the School of Fine Arts. He officially became the director two years later, on August 4, 1953.

In addition to his monumental works, Tolentino created smaller sculptures that are now housed in the National Museum of Fine Arts, as well as busts of heroes displayed at Malacañang Palace. He also designed the Ramon Magsaysay Award medals and the seal of the Republic of the Philippines.

== Later years and death ==
In 1955, Tolentino retired from the University of the Philippines and returned to private practice. He received various awards and distinctions in his later years, most notably his designation as a National Artist by President Ferdinand Marcos on May 15, 1973.

Tolentino died on July 12, 1976, at his home on Retiro Street in Quezon City. He was interred at the Libingan ng mga Bayani, a privilege accorded to National Artists.

== Awards and exhibitions ==
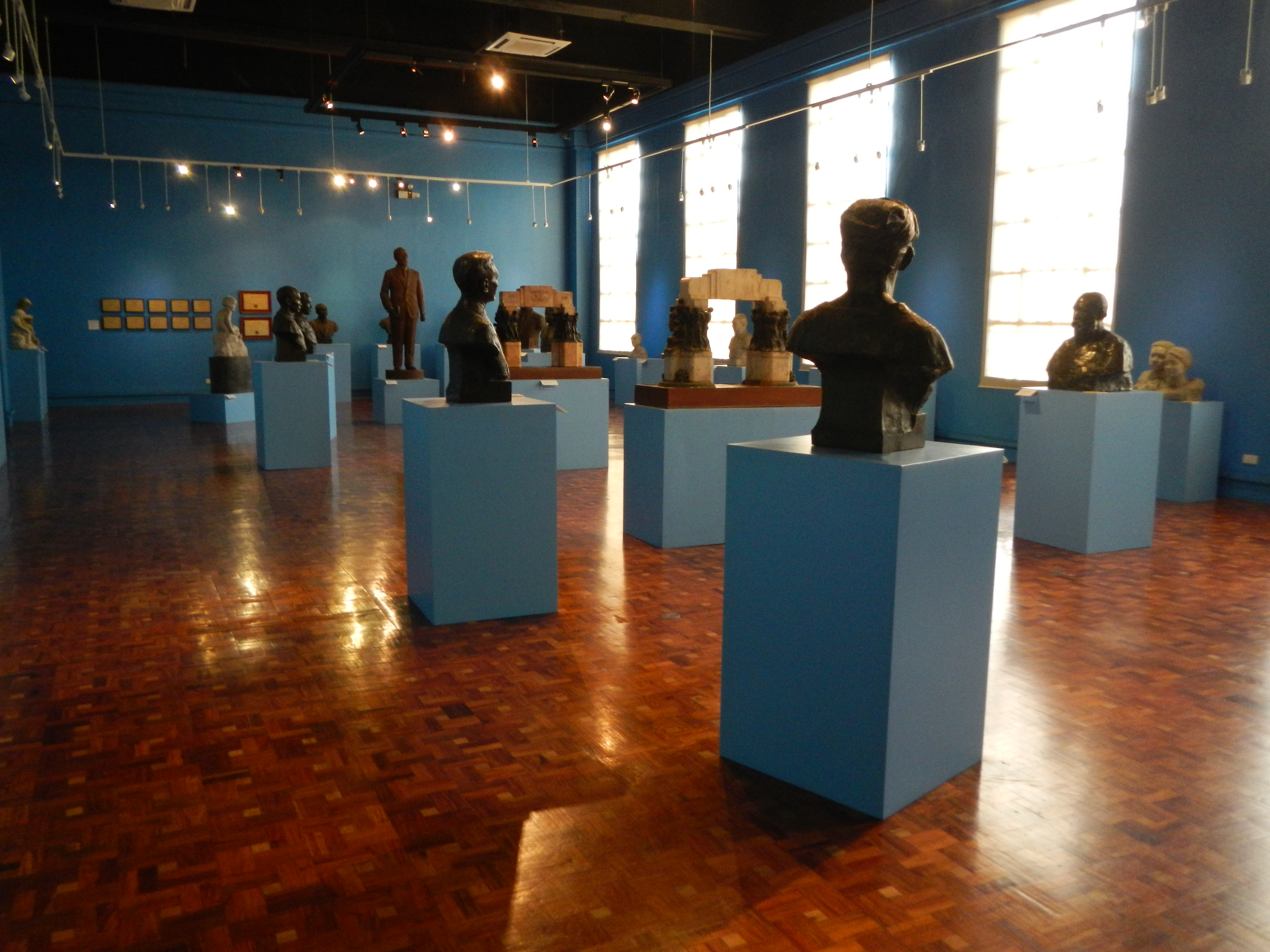
A gallery displaying Tolentino's works

Tolentino received the following awards and citations:

- 1959 – UNESCO Cultural Award in Sculpture
- 1963 – Patnubay ng Sining at Kalinangan Award
- 1967 – Republic Cultural Heritage Award
- 1970 – Presidential Medal of Merit
- 1972 – Diwa ng Lahi Award
- 1973 – National Artist of the Philippines for Visual Arts in Sculpture

=== Exhibitions at the National Museum of Fine Arts ===
Guillermo Tolentino's works and memorabilia are primarily housed in Gallery XII (Security Bank Hall) of the National Museum of Fine Arts. This exhibition was made possible through the collaboration of his family, Security Bank president Frederick Dy, Judy Araneta-Roxas, Ernesto and Araceli Salas, and Nestor Jordin.

Works relating to Jose Rizal by Tolentino and other 20th-century Filipino artists are displayed in Gallery V of the museum.
