= Diocesan Shrine of Saint Therese of the Child Jesus (UPLB) =

Roman Catholic church in Laguna, Philippines

St. Thérèse Church
- Diocesan Shrine of St. Therese of the Child Jesus
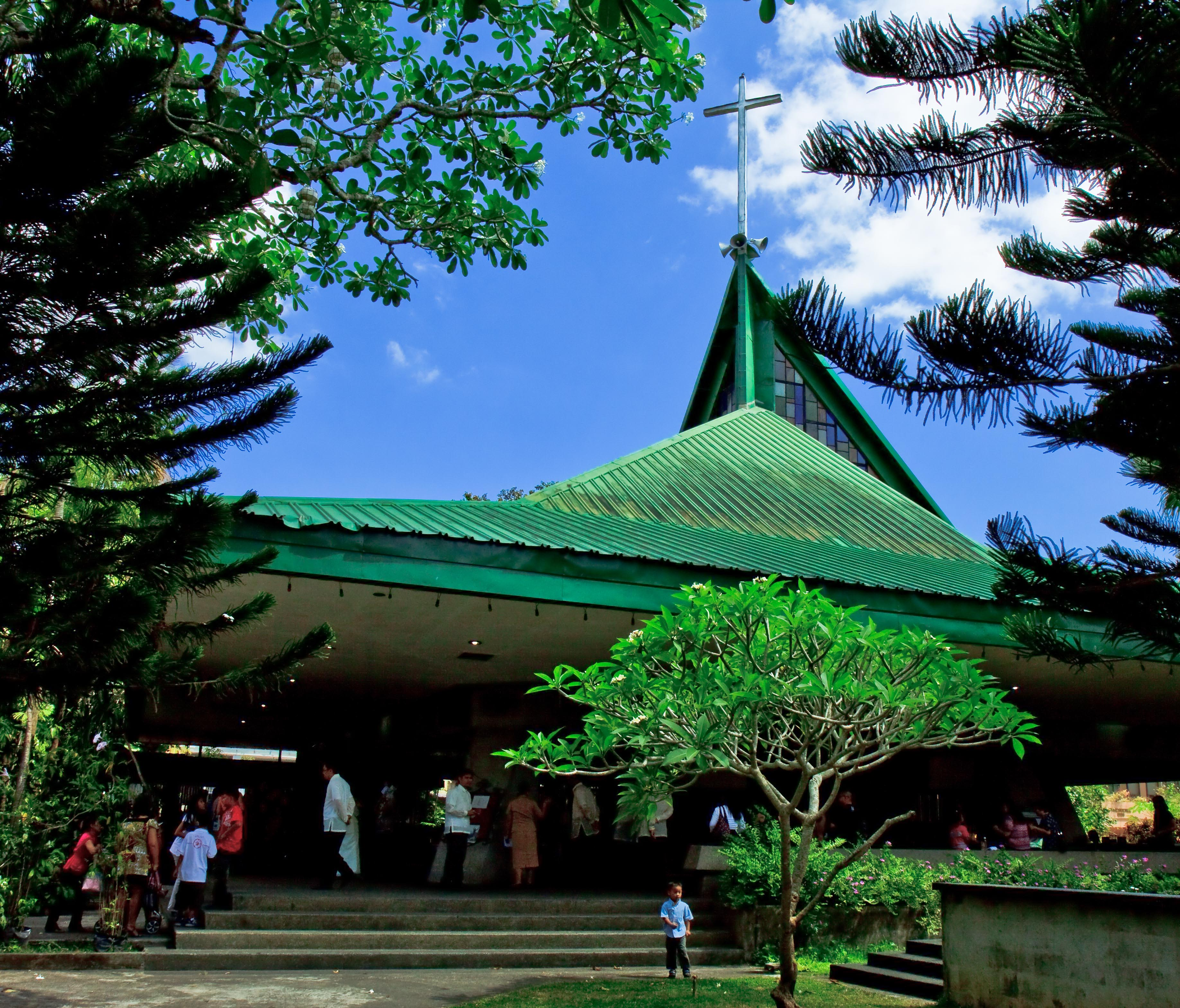
- The church in 2010

- Location in Laguna Location in Luzon Location in the Philippines
- 14°9′53″N 121°14′42″E
- Location: 10867 Victoria M. Ela Street (formerly Silangan Road), University of the Philippines Los Baños, College, Los Baños, Laguna
- Country: Philippines
- Denomination: Roman Catholic
- Website: https://www.facebook.com/DiocesanShrineofSt.ThereseUPLB

History
- Former name: Saint Thérèse of the Child Jesus Parish
- Status: Diocesan shrine and parish church
- Founded: 1927 (as chapel); 1958 (as parish church)
- Dedication: Thérèse of the Child Jesus

Architecture
- Functional status: Active
- Architect: Felipe M. Mendoza
- Architectural type: Church building
- Style: Modern contemporary

Specifications
- Capacity: 1,500
- Materials: Concrete, wood, and metal

Administration
- District: 2
- Province: Manila
- Archdiocese: Manila
- Diocese: San Pablo
- Deanery: Immaculate Conception

Clergy
- Rector: Philip B. Atienza (2019–present)
- Vicar: Niel Allen G. Lopez

The Diocesan Shrine of Saint Therese of the Child Jesus, formerly known as Saint Thérèse of the Child Jesus Parish, is a Roman Catholic church located along Victoria M. Ela St. inside the University of the Philippines Los Baños campus and is often referred to as the unofficial "UPLB Chapel or "College Chapel". The church is under the jurisdiction of the Diocese of San Pablo. It is the first church in the Philippines dedicated to Saint Thérèse of the Child Jesus as its first titular patroness (since 1927) and one of the three Roman catholic churches in the municipality of Los Baños, Laguna, Philippines.

== History ==
The devotion to St. Thérèse of the Child Jesus started in the mid-1920s due to students and professors of the University of the Philippines College of Agriculture and School of Forestry. Upon petitioning church authorities to build a chapel outside the university's perimeter fence, a chapel was built in honor of St. Thérèse in 1927 with a seating capacity of 120 people. Since then, it has become the unofficial catholic college chapel. The first chaplain was Father John Hurley. Another former chaplain was Msgr. Edward Francis Casey, who was the only diocesan priest incarcerated in the Los Baños Internment Camp, located near the College Chapel. While imprisoned in the internment camp, he was appointed as vicar general of the Prelature Nullius of the Los Baños Internment Camp, created by the Apostolic Delegate Guglielmo Piani to oversee the spiritual welfare and safety of foreign catholic religious men and women imprisoned in the camp. The parish was officially established under the Archdiocese of Lipa in 1958. It serves the spiritual needs of the former parishioners of the Immaculate Conception Parish living around the University of the Philippines College of Agriculture and College of Forestry. Due to lack of priests, the parish was administered by priests from the Society of the Divine Word (SVD) for 33 years. The present church with a seating capacity of 1,500 was built and blessed in 1971. In 2000, the secular priests took charge of the parish, with Monsignor Bernardino Cortez and Father Gabriel Ma. Delfino as parish priest and assistant parish priest, respectively. When Monsignor Cortez was appointed as Auxiliary Bishop of Manila, Monsignor James Contreras succeeded as parish priest. From 2008 to 2013, the church was administered by Father Jose Thor R. Villacarlos, and was succeeded by Rev. Fr. Luis A. Tolentino, Parish Priest (2013–2019) and its first Shrine Rector (2016–2019). Currently, DSSTCJ is being shepherded by Rev. Fr. Philip B. Atienza as its Parish Priest and Shrine Rector (2019–Present). Fr. Philip is a native of Lumban, Laguna and a former director of the Diocesan Catholic Schools System (DCSS) of the Diocese of San Pablo.

In 2013, the relics of St. Thérèse visited the UPLB community as part of its world pilgrimage. The parish church was elevated to a diocesan shrine on October 1, 2016.

Between January 30 and 31, 2023, the pilgrim relics of St. Thérèse made a stop for the 5th time in the Church's history, in commemoration of her 150th birth anniversary. In 2027, it is anticipated to be the Centennial Jubilee of the Shrine as well the devotion to the little flower of Jesus which blossomed in a tiny place of worship more popularly known as the College Chapel - believed to be the first Church in the Philippines dedicated to St. Thérèse of the Child Jesus.

=== Facilities ===
Most of the church facilities and adjacent church structures was constructed under the Foundation of St. Thérèse Parish, Inc. (FSTPI), which caters the material needs of the church. It includes the parish rectory (including the rectory annex), Garden of Peace (ossuary), St. Thérèse Baptistry, Resurrection Chapel, and sacristy. After due technical process and mutual understanding, the pastoral care and management has been turned over to the Diocese of San Pablo in which the foundation is no longer directly connected with the current administration. Due to the protocols established during the COVID-19 pandemic, an open venue named as DSSTCJ al fresco was inaugurated in 2022 where major social events and formation activities are being made. In November 2022, a groundbreaking ceremony was held for the first phase of the Resurrection Garden Expansion Plan, which aims to provide additional niches for cremated urns and enhance the structural aesthetics of the current columbary. The second phase, which is scheduled to begin construction in 2024, will upgrade the two existing memorial chapels and add a second floor for more columbary units and a provision for two new memorial chapels. During the 2023 fiesta celebration, the rehabilitated choir loft of the main church was officially inaugurated. This was done to improve the structural stability and increase its load-bearing capacity so that more servers can be accommodated in all Mass service. Several improvements and renovations were made up to this day to sustain and accommodate more pilgrims and Church goers with the Shrine's ongoing pastoral, devotional, and formation programs.
