= Training Center for Tropical Resources and Ecosystems Sustainability =

- Abbreviation: TREES
- Predecessor: Centre for Forestry Education Research and Development for Asia and the Pacific Regions (CFERDAP)
- Formation: June 25, 1998; 28 years ago
- Location: Los Baños, Laguna
- Director: Crusty E. Tinio, PhD
- Parent organization: University of the Philippines Los Baños College of Forestry and Natural Resources

The Training Center for Tropical Resources and Ecosystems Sustainability (TREES) is an international training and continuing education unit of the University of the Philippines Los Baños College of Forestry and Natural Resources (CFNR). It was established on June 25, 1998. and organizes training courses and study tours related to tropical forestry, natural resource management, and ecosystems management. It has taught more than 6,000 graduates from over 40 countries.

== History ==
The Centre for Forestry Education Research and Development for Asia and the Pacific (CFERDAP) was founded in 1979 with founding support from the Food and Agriculture Organization (FAO), SIDA, and GOP through UPLB. In 1981, it was renamed to Centre for Forestry Education for Asia and Southwest Pacific Regions (CFED).

In 1985, CFNR recognized the need for a college-wide system for conducting trainings. Through the merger of Forestry Research and Extension Center (FREC) and the FAO-UPLB-CFED project, the Institute of Forest Conservation (IFC) was founded on January 22, 1985. It was mandated to coordinate CFNR's forestry research, extension services and training, to develop and conserve Mount Makiling, and to generate resources for future activities. The IFC's Forestry Training Office (FTO) became the central training unit to develop, and conducts international and local training courses and study tours. The IFC became the first accredited provider of Continuing Professional Education (CPE) courses for forestry professionals in the Philippines, accredited by the Professional Regulation Commission on 24 October 1996.

On June 25, 1998, IFC was divided into two: the Training Center for Tropical Resources and Ecosystems Sustainability (TREES) and the Makiling Center for Mountain Ecosystems (MCME). TREES took over the functions of the former FTO. It was provided with the autonomy and authority to plan, market, and implement CFNR's training projects. On December 14, 2000, TREES was declared as an accredited training institute by the Civil Service Commission (CSC). Ittraining center engages trainers and facilitators from a pool of UPLB faculty and staff members as well as experts from collaborating and organizations.

TREES conducts training courses and study tours, and designs customized training projects.
