= Raid on Los Baños =

1945 American-Filipino raid on a Japanese internment camp

Coordinates: 14°09′42″N 121°14′33″E

- Part of the Pacific Theater of World War II
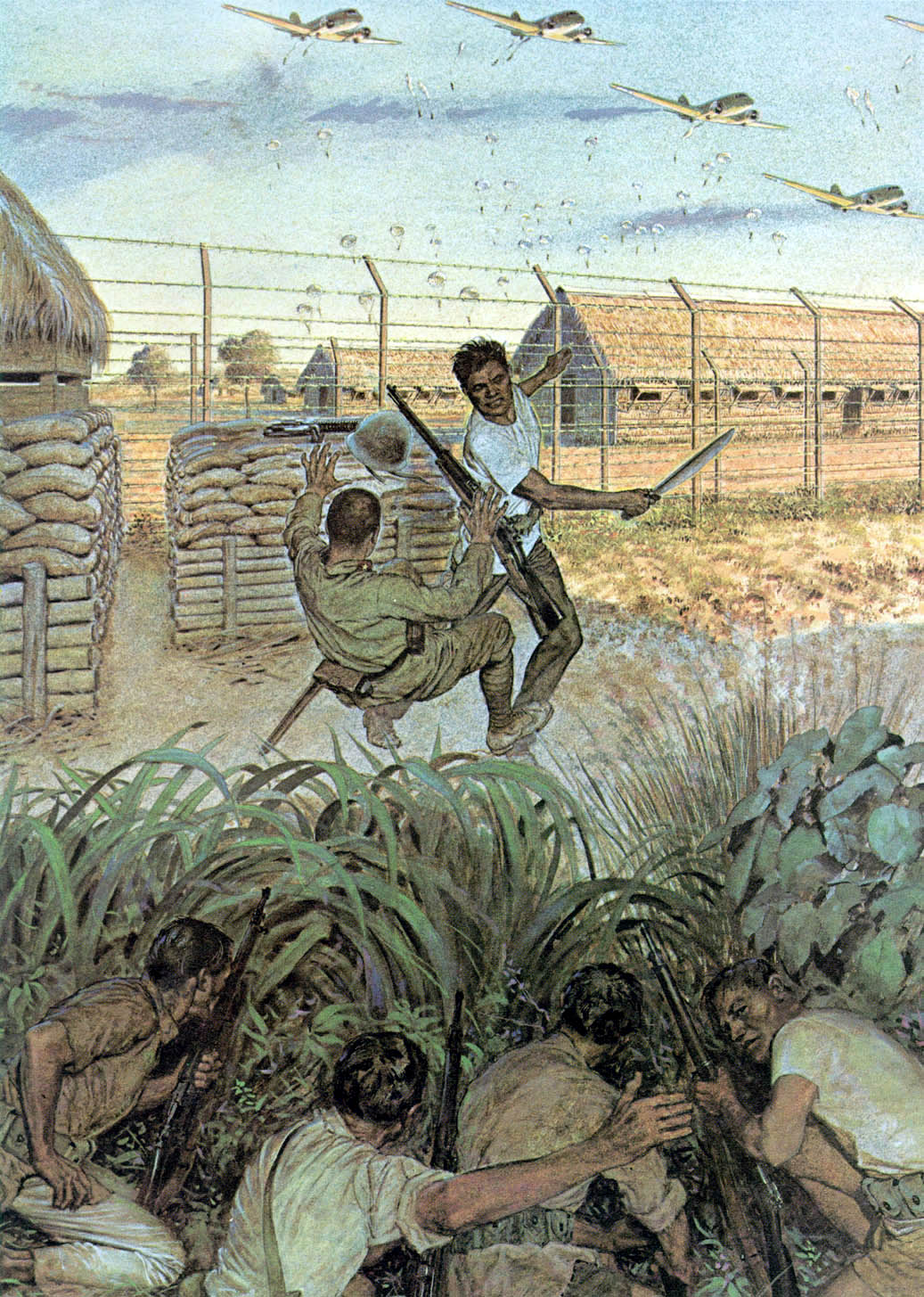
- Painting of a guerrilla attacking a Japanese sentry with a bolo knife
Date	23 February 1945
Location	Los Baños, Laguna, Philippines
Result	Allied victory: Successful Allied military rescue operation

Belligerents
United States: Commonwealth of the Philippines	Japan

Commanders and leaders
(United States) Henry A. Burgress (United States) Edward Lahti (United States) John Ringler (United States) Robert H. Soule (United States) Joseph W. Gibbs (Philippines) Gustavo Inglés	(Empire of Japan) Major Tanaka (Empire of Japan) Major Urabe (Empire of Japan) Major T. Iwanaka (Empire of Japan) Sadaaki Konishi

Strength
Company of U.S. paratroopers 300 troops on amphibian trucks 800 Filipino guerrillas	150–250 Japanese guards 8,000–10,000 Japanese soldiers near camp

Casualties and losses
United States: 3 killed 2 wounded Philippine Commonwealth: 2 killed 4 wounded	70–80 killed

The Raid on Los Baños (Filipino: Pagsalakay sa Los Baños) in the Philippines, early Friday morning on 23 February 1945, was executed by a combined United States Army Airborne and Filipino guerrilla task force, resulting in the liberation of 2,147 Allied civilian and military internees from an agricultural school campus turned Japanese internment camp. The raid has been celebrated as one of the most successful rescue operations in modern military history, although it led to the massacre of 1500 Filipino civilians in retaliation. It was the second precisely-executed raid by combined U.S.-Filipino forces within a month, following on the heels of the Raid at Cabanatuan at Luzon on 30 January, in which 522 Allied military POWs had been rescued.

== Background ==
Since the landings of the U.S. Sixth Army at Lingayen Gulf and the U.S. Eighth Army at Nasugbu, Batangas on 9 January 1945 and 31 January 1945 respectively, to retake Luzon, the Imperial Japanese Army was being repeatedly pushed back and was increasingly becoming desperate. Soon news was filtering down to Allied commanders that the Japanese were killing innocent civilians and prisoners of war while falling back.

General Douglas MacArthur was deeply alarmed about the plight of thousands of prisoners who had been interned in various camps on Luzon, since the early days of the Pacific War. There was concern that, with deliverance so near, they might be killed. Earlier, some daring raids were carried out to rescue POWs, including one at Cabanatuan and at the University of Santo Tomas Internment Camp and Bilibid Prison at the height of the Battle for Manila.

=== Los Baños Internment Camp ===
In Los Baños, Laguna, at the University of the Philippines College of Agriculture and School of Forestry, now the University of the Philippines Los Baños, which was located on a 60-acre (240,000 m^{2}) site, was the POW and civilian concentration camp, wedged between the foothills of Mount Makiling and the northern shore of Los Baños facing Laguna de Bay. The camp was being constructed next to Baker Hall, by the first group of 800 men who arrived in May 1943. In December 1943, an additional 200 inmates arrived from the University of Santo Tomas Internment Camp, followed by 500 in April 1944, and 150 in December.

Surrounded by barbed wire fences in clusters of thatched huts were Americans, British, Australians, Dutch, Norwegians, Poles, Italians, and Canadians. Aside from eleven navy nurses under the command of Chief Nurse Laura M. Cobb and a few servicemen, almost all of the inmates were civilian businessmen, teachers, bankers, and missionaries caught by the Japanese during the course of the war and incarcerated in various POW camps in the country.

While incarcerated, the POWs had formed an Executive Committee to deal with the guards for self-governing purposes and to obtain whatever marginal freedom or concessions they could obtain from the Japanese prison authorities. Nonetheless, the internees were made to get by on dwindling rations, limited clothing, poor housing and non-existent sanitation and endure the sadistic tendencies of the camp guards. Because of the large number of foreign catholic religious men and women incarcerated in the camp, Apostolic Delegate Guglielmo Piani created the Prelature Nullius of the Los Baños Internment Camp on September 1944 using the extraordinary faculties granted to him by Pope Pius XII. The prelature was tasked to oversee the welfare and spiritual needs of the 335 foreign missionaries and religious from allied countries residing in the Philippines who were incarcerated in the camp. The interned Bishop of Tuguegarao Constant Jurgens was appointed bishop prelate while the interned diocesan priest Msgr. Edward Francis Casey was appointed as vicar general. Monsignor Casey was the chaplain of the Catholic College Chapel located in UPLB. A cathedral was set up in the camp called the Cathedral of Saint Joseph, which was one of the barracks in the section of the camp where the foreign religious men and women were interned.

The first commandant of the camp, Major Tanaka, was considered "reasonably fair" in his treatment of the prisoners. He was later replaced by Major Urabe, who was also a reasonable man. In July 1944, he was replaced by the third commandant, Major T. Iwanaka, a cruel man:

To the internees, Iwanaka appeared afflicted with what would today be called dementia. He left the day-to-day operations of Los Baños to a subordinate, Warrant Officer Sadaaki Konishi. Both seemed inclined to inflict as much suffering upon the internees as possible.

By early 1945, the conditions in the camp turned hellish, with enforced limited rations and mounting abuse, courtesy of Konishi.

=== Mission ===
The U.S. 11th Airborne Division under Major general Joseph Swing arrived in the southwest Pacific in mid-1944. Prior to taking part in the invasion of Leyte in October, the division had undergone theater combat training in New Guinea. Together with the 503rd Parachute Regimental Combat Team, these were the only U.S. Army airborne forces in the Pacific theater of operations. After Leyte, the 188th Glider Infantry Regiment spearheaded the landings at Nasugbu with the U.S. Eighth Army on 31 January, while the 511th Parachute Infantry Regiment parachuted into Tagaytay Ridge on 3 February.

That same day, 3 February 1945, Swing was tasked with a rescue mission to rescue the internees at the Los Baños camp, some 20 miles (32 km) behind the Japanese lines. However, with the 11th Airborne committed to a series of pitched battles south of Manila and the resolute Japanese defense at Nichols Field and Fort William McKinley, immediate deployment was out of the question. As an interim measure, Swing ordered his subordinates to develop a plan that could be implemented at the earliest possible moment, a task that was headed by his G-2 Colonel Henry Muller. Then on 18 February, the 1st Battalion, 511th Parachute Infantry Regiment, under Major Henry Burgess, the main unit assigned to carry out the mission, was pulled out from its battlefield position on the so-called Genko Line, a fortified system of interlocking pillboxes and anti-tank fortifications running along the southern Manila district of Las Piñas and proceeded to Parañaque district to rest and regroup.

By 20 February 1945, the conditions on Luzon turned favorable, such that the various elements could be withdrawn from combat and apprised of their mission. They were ordered to their staging posts and readied to go, with the raid scheduled for 07:00 on 23 February. For the jump phase of the assault plan, the 511th regimental commander, Lt. Col. Edward Lahti appointed Company B, 1st Battalion, 511th Parachute Infantry Regiment of the 11th Airborne Division under 1st Lt. John Ringler together with the Headquarters Company Light Machine Gun Platoon of 2nd Lt. Walter Hettinger. The 188th Glider Infantry Regiment of Colonel Robert Soule had perhaps the most daunting task; trying to stave off a counterattack from the main highway. Bivouacked across the San Juan River were some 8,000–10,000 Japanese troops of the 8th "Tiger" Division, commanded by Lieutenant general Shizuo Yokoyama.

=== Guerrilla connection ===
The various Filipino guerrilla groups operating in the vicinity of Los Baños played a key role that led to the successful liberation of the camp. Earlier, in the partisan war against the Japanese, a combined guerrilla command was formed to bring some order to the effort by the defunct USAFFE command, which was in charge of unconventional forces in the Philippines, and renamed as the General Guerrilla Command (GGC) of Luzon under Major Jay D. Vanderpool of the U.S. Army whom the 11th Airborne soldiers affectionately called, "The Little Corporal".

Under the GGC, the Hunters ROTC (Reserve Officers Training Corps) guerrillas, made up originally of former cadets of the Philippine Military Academy along with some former ROTC and college students under the command of Colonel Frank Quesada were one of the most active groups. Other formations included President Quezon's Own Guerrillas (PQOG) under Colonel Fil Avanceña, Red Lion's Unit, the Filipino-Chinese 48th Squadron and the Villegas group of the Hukbalahaps were tasked by the GGC to coordinate operations related to Los Baños. Among the members of Hunters-ROTC guerillas who participated in the raid was the future Filipino film star Mario Montenegro, then only sixteen years old.

=== Plan ===
Long before the arrival of the U.S. liberation forces, the guerrillas conducted intelligence operations that gathered precise inside information about the POWs in Los Baños and their guards. Many prisoners were long-time friends of partisan families before the war. With Lieutenant colonel Gustavo Inglés designated as overall guerrilla coordinator with the 11th Airborne Division, information was shared with Swing's Command Staff, including Colonel Henry Muller (G-2), and Colonel Douglas Quandt (G-3), as well as other top planners, who fine-tuned the final strategy.

On 12 February, Freddy Zervoulakos, a 19-year-old Greek-Filipino, slipped out of the camp and made contact with the guerrillas. He was sent back into the camp with the promise that the internees would be rescued. But the internee committee decided that it would be best for the prisoners to do nothing. A week later, another escapee from the camp, a civilian engineer named Pete Miles, gave further valuable information to the 11th A/B Division planners, including the daily routine in the camp, details of troop positions and the exact location of the internees. This proved a great asset to the planners and enabled them to finalize the four-phase plan that was timed to coincide with the guards' exercise period, which was conducted by the Japanese troops without clothing, equipment, or weapons, thereby minimizing the risk of harm to the internees during the rescue. Meanwhile, two lieutenants made a reconnaissance of the drop zone with the guerrillas and the two internees.

The Joint U.S. Army-Guerrilla Assault Plan was as follows:

- Phase 1 would begin when the 11th Airborne's Provisional Reconnaissance Platoon, under the command of 1Lt. George Skau, together with some twenty Filipino guerrilla guides, would travel behind enemy lines by bancas (local fishing boats) across Laguna Lake two nights before the raid, where they would wait. Four assault teams under Sergeants Martin Squires, Terry Santos (4th class graduate of the Alamo Scouts Training Center), Cliff Town and Robert Angus would assault the camp gate from different angles. At 07:00 on 23 February they were charged with marking the Drop Zones, Landing Zones and for the neutralizing of the camp gate guards, simultaneous with an attack from the remaining directions by the guerrillas' 45th Hunter Regiment under Lieutenant Colonel Inglés, who would also surround the entire camp perimeter prior to the signaled hour.
- In Phase 2, B Company, 1st Battalion, 511th PIR led by Lieutenant John Ringler, with the support of Lieutenant Walter Hettinger's Machine Gun Platoon, would parachute into a small drop zone next to the camp, rendezvous with a Hukbalahap guerrilla unit, neutralize the remaining camp guards and secure the internees.
- In Phase 3, the remainder of 1st Battalion would board 54 LVT(4) tracked amphibious assault vehicles of the 672nd Amphibian Tractor Battalion commanded by Lieutenant colonel Joseph W. Gibbs at 04:00 and slip into Laguna de Bay and head for Mayondon Point, near San Antonio, some 2 miles (3.2 km) from the camp. A Recon Platoon squad under Sergeant Leonard Hahn would mark and guide them to their landing point. Here they would travel overland and make their way to the camp, scheduling to arrive shortly after 07:00. They would then carry the internees back to Mayondon Point and make good their escape to Mamatid village.
- Phase 4 involved the 188th Glider Infantry Regiment (minus its 2nd Battalion) and Company C of the 637th Tank Destroyer Battalion together with elements of the 472nd and 675th Field Artillery Battalions, under Colonel Robert H. Soule. The force would move down Highway 1 to act as a diversionary force and to engage the Japanese 8th Division, if necessary, so as to protect the flank.

Other guerrilla units such as Marking's Fil-American troops and the 48th Chinese Squadron were to set up road blocks in the towns of Calauan, Bay and Pila to delay possible Japanese reinforcements. The Hunters-ROTC 47th Regiment under Lieutenant colonel Emmanuel de Ocampo would do the same in the Calamba-Pansol area.

The backup 11th A/B pack howitzers in Calamba, Laguna, area was to bombard the road towards Los Baños. All the surrounding approaches and to the main camp would be secured. The townspeople were briefed and asked to vacate Los Baños by the local PQOG home-guard units.

== Raid ==
Under cover of darkness on 21 February 1945, Skau and his 31-man platoon left the west shore of Laguna de Bay and headed across the lake in three bancas. Skau and six men led the way while the separate assault team of 23 men followed soon after. Avoiding Japanese patrol craft on the lake, they landed near Nanhaya and met with local guerrillas and some camp escapees at the local schoolhouse. Included in the group were Freddy Zervoulakos and Benjamin Edwards, another young escapee, who sketched the layout of the camp on the schoolhouse blackboard. Skau decided to split his group into six teams, assigning a number of guerrillas to each team. Edwards and Zervoulakos each accompanied one team. On the night of 22 February, they journeyed through the jungle and rice paddies to their starting points.

At 04:00 on 23 February 1945 the 1st Battalion 511PIR (less B Company) boarded 54 LVT-4s, slipped into Laguna de Bay, and headed for Mayondon Point. They also managed to reach their destination without alerting any Japanese defenders and headed off for the remaining 2 miles (3.2 km) overland journey to the camp, aiming to arrive just after 07:00.

Meanwhile, Lieutenant Ringler's B Company, 511th PIR together with the Light Machine Gun Platoon, had spent the moonless night of 22 February waiting at Nichols Field where, in the early dawn, they donned their parachutes, put on their equipment, and loaded onto nine C-47s of the 65th Troop Carrier Squadron, under the command of Major Don Anderson, for the short flight. Flying unopposed by Japanese aircraft or antiaircraft fire, they soon arrived at their destination, which was clearly marked with green smoke by the Reconnaissance Platoon.

The Recon Platoon teams led by Skau and Sergeants. Angus, Call and Town took out the guard posts on the north and west side of the camp. The Hunters ROTC guerrillas chased after and killed the Japanese guards.

At 07:00, coming in at the planned 500 feet (150 m) jump altitude and in three "V"s of three aircraft, Ringler's paratroopers dropped from their aircraft. B Company charged the camp 15–20 minutes after the attack was launched, entering through openings cut by the scouts. The firefight was short and intense, and with the Japanese defeated, the internees freed.

The LVT-4s came ashore in nine columns of six vehicles after green smoke grenades were popped on San Antonio beach, by Sergeant Hahn and Marking's guerrillas, at 0658. Led by Burgess, the amtracs reached the camp, knocking out a pillbox and crashed through the camp gate.

== Evacuation ==
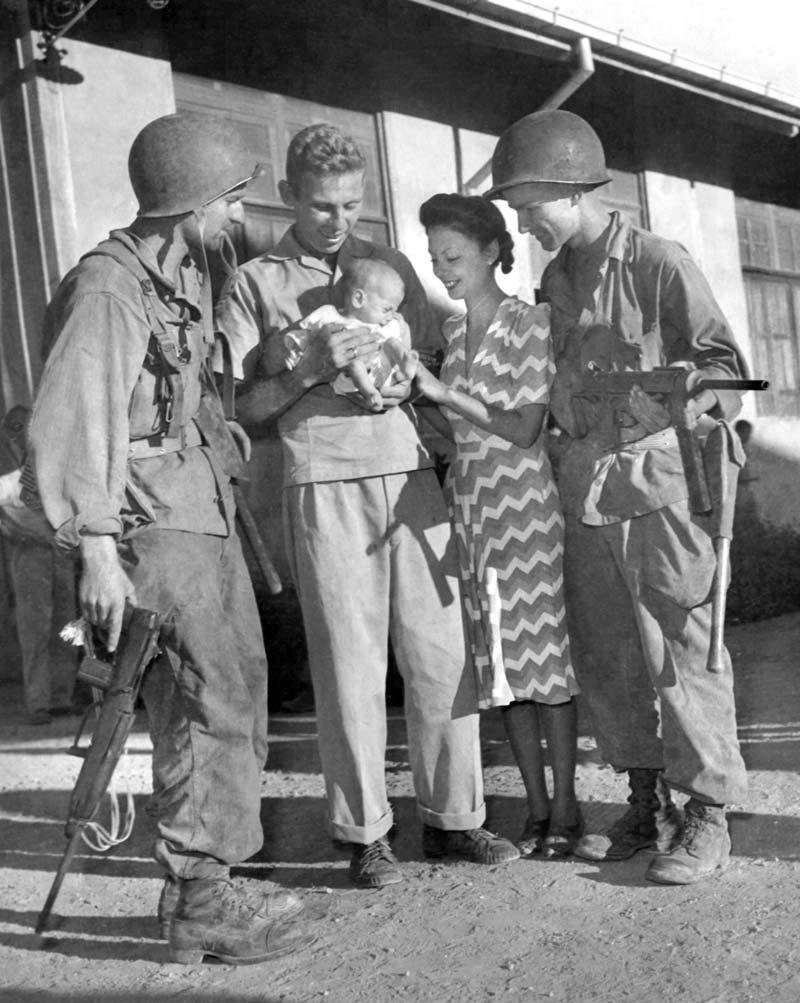
Los Baños internees with 11th Airborne paratroopers after the raid on 23 February 1945

Mindful of the need for speed, Ringler's men rounded up the internees as rapidly as they could. Some prisoners refused to leave, so Hettlinger's men burned the camp's remaining huts to encourage the internees to load into the LVTs. At first, the disabled, along with the women and children, were loaded onto the waiting vehicles, while the more able internees formed a walking column and headed for the beach and freedom.

In the distance, across the lake, intense fire was heard. That sound was from the Soule Task Force. Early that morning, the diversionary force of the 188th Glider Infantry Regiment and Company C of the 637th Tank Destroyer Battalion, together with elements of the 472nd and 675th Field Artillery Battalions under Soule, rolled out into Highway 1 and attacked across the San Juan River. They ran into Japanese opposition near the Lechería Hills where casualties were taken, but by mid-morning they had cleared the area and were marching towards Los Baños and cutting off the road between the Japanese 8th Tiger Division and Los Baños. From an elevated position, Soule could see, in the distance, the Amtracs on the beach heading back to Mamatid, so he ordered his force to conduct a defensive withdrawal and to re-establish its bridgehead across the San Juan River.

Finally, after two trips, the last of the LVTs departed at 15:00 for Mamatid. The internees included a three-day-old baby girl, Lois Kathleen McCoy. Frank Buckles, who would become the last surviving American veteran of World War I, was also among the prisoners; he had been captured as a civilian in Manila.

== Aftermath ==
Two of Sgt. Santos's Recon Platoon members and four Filipino guerrillas were wounded. Two 188th Glider Infantry Regiment soldiers, John T. Doiron and Vernal Ray McMurtrey, were killed at the Lecheria Hills engagement. The hand-to-hand skirmish was not without casualties. A handful of guards were able to muster a makeshift defense, killing two young Hunter guerrillas, Pfc. Atanacio Castillo and Pfc. Anselmo Soler. Their bodies were recovered and buried beside the College chapel.

Firsthand accounts include that of former internee, Lewis Thomas Watty, vice president of the POW committee, who said:

The ensuing fight went on for very long minutes without letup, enemy defenders caught by total surprise were pinned and cut down mercilessly by liberator's fire. The Hunter experience through the years in irregular warfare paid off handsomely. It was also true of the paratroopers who were veterans of the South Pacific before they landed in Luzon.

A few days after the rescue, the Japanese in full force, led by the escaped Sadaaki Konishi, returned to Los Baños. Upon seeing that there were no POWs in sight, the Japanese turned their wrath on the remaining civilians in town who had failed to heed the warning from the guerrillas to leave. With the help of the pro-Japanese Makapili militia, the Japanese massacred some 1,500 men, women and children, and burned their homes, as well as those in the adjacent towns suspected of collaborating with the liberators. Konishi was found and tried for his war crimes and hanged in 1947. Major Iwanaka escaped.

=== Historical significance ===
I doubt that any airborne unit in the world will ever be able to rival the Los Baños prison raid. It is the textbook airborne operation for all ages and all armies.

— General Colin Powell, then-Chairman of the Joint Chiefs of Staff

The outstanding success of the Los Baños raid incorporated many facets that revolutionized generations of future special military operations. Thorough planning, reliable intelligence, stealth, speed and surprise, superior firepower, cooperation by friendly forces, and support of the populace gave the planners and forces implementing the raid an advantage that resulted in few casualties.

== Historical commemoration ==
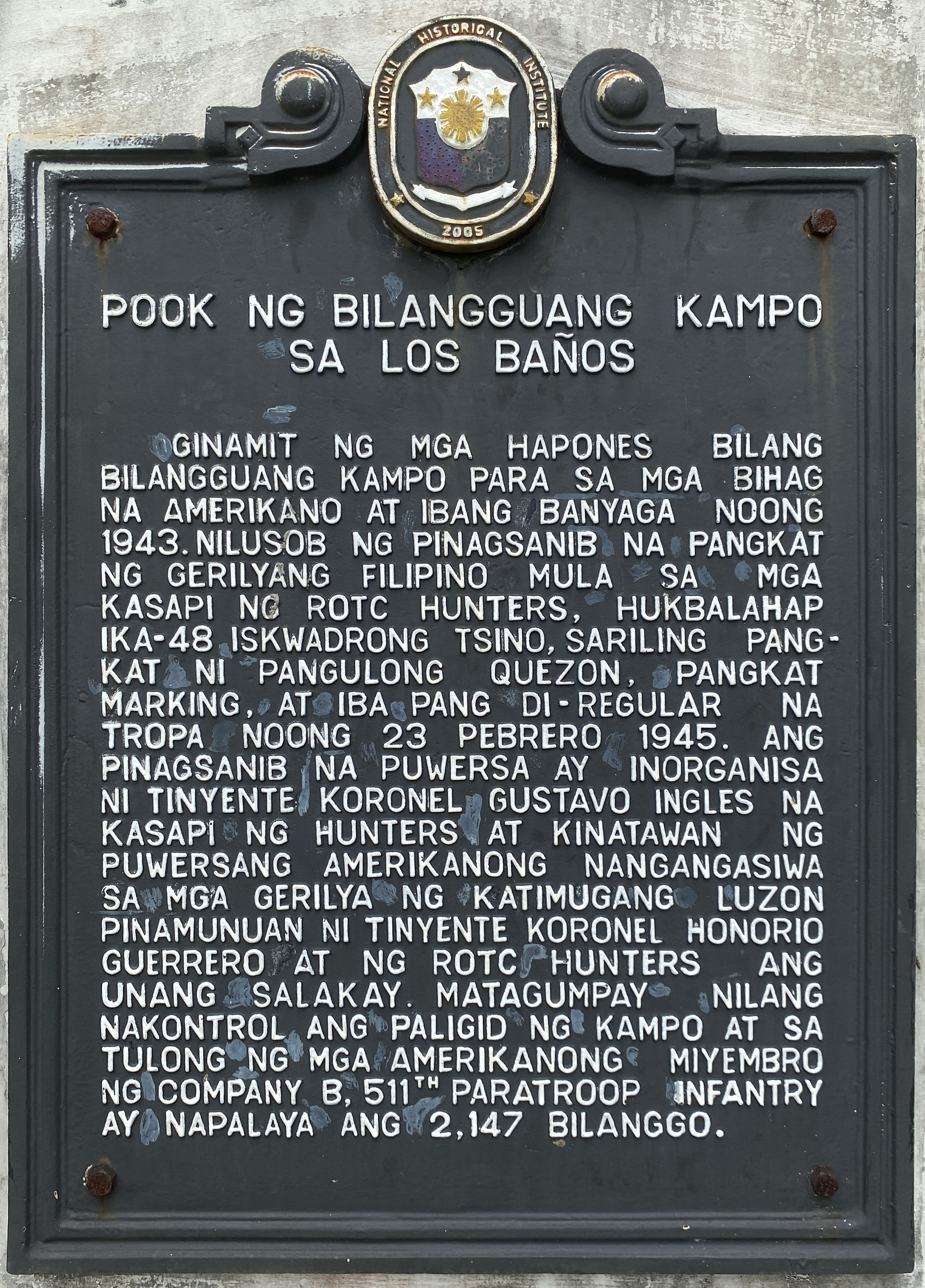
National historical marker installed in 2005 at the site of the internment camp

=== 11th Airborne Division Association Commemoration ===
The regional chapters of the 11th Airborne Division Association celebrate the raid and rescue with a Los Baños Commemoration Dinner on or about 23 February every year. The Hunters-ROTC Filipino guerrillas and other partisan units, who supported the 11th Airborne Division also commemorate the freeing of the prison camp.

=== Los Baños Liberation Memorial Scholarship Foundation ===
To help keep the memory and meaning of the Los Baños rescue alive, a small group of civilian ex-prisoners of war established The Los Baños Liberation Memorial Scholarship Foundation, Inc., a non-profit, tax-exempt California corporation, organized and operated exclusively for educational purposes within the meaning of U.S. Internal Revenue Code Section 501(c)(3). Through tax-deductible contributions, the Foundation is creating a permanent endowment fund. The purpose of the Foundation is to grant scholarship awards to students of Filipino citizenship enrolled at The Rural High School of the University of the Philippines in Los Baños, to encourage and enable them to complete the Rural High School program. In 2010, twelve students from low-income families were receiving scholarships in the amount of $250 each per year, enabling them to pay required fees and stay in school until graduation if they perform well. As part of their curriculum, these scholars do historical research or creative arts on the subject of Los Baños during World War II, including the actions of the 11th Airborne Division and the Hunters ROTC Guerrillas and the murder of many of the citizens of Los Baños at the hands of the vengeful Japanese troops and the Makapili collaborators.

=== U.S. Congress Joint Resolution 18 ===
On 16 February 2005, House Joint Resolution 18, sponsored by U.S. Representative Trent Franks was passed by the House. This resolution commemorated the raid and reaffirmed the nation's commitment to a full accounting of prisoners of war and those missing in action.

The truly heroic acts at Los Baños serve not only as examples of the humanitarian compassion of American servicemen and women, but also as an example of our nation’s long-standing commitment to leave no soldier, living or dead, in enemy hands. As we have military personnel spread throughout the world today, many of whom are daily risking capture and torture at the hands of brutal terrorists, it is more important than ever to recognize and honor the heroism and willing sacrifice of those soldiers who risk their own safety not to take a strategic objective, but simply to bring a comrade home. Throughout history, American servicemen have made a habit of putting themselves squarely in evil’s way. They have done so secure in the knowledge that if they fall into the hands of the enemy, they will not be forgotten. Indeed, every effort possible will be undertaken to bring them home. In this, the 60th anniversary of the liberation of over 2,000 prisoners from the camp at Los Baños – and at a time when our military is deployed in harm’s way far around the globe, let us recognize those individuals who sacrificed to bring their brothers and sisters home. And let’s honor the heroic actions of the past by officially reaffirming our nation’s commitment to leave no fighting man or woman in enemy hands, at any time, now or in the future.

(Remarks made on the floor of the House by Representative Franks.)

=== 60th Anniversary Commemoration at Los Baños and Beyond ===
On 23 February 2005, the 60th anniversary of the raid was commemorated with the unveiling of a historical marker at the former internment camp (Baker Hall, University of the Philippines Los Baños). The ceremony was attended by several government officials from national, provincial and municipal levels, university officials as well as the U.S. Ambassador to the Philippines.

On 22 February 2016, the 71st anniversary of the raid of Los Baños was held at Baker Hall, University of the Philippines Los Baños. Part of the day's celebration included the film showing of the documentary "Unsurrendered 2" by Director Bani Logroño, Spyron-AV Manila.

== See also ==
- Military history of the Philippines during World War II
- Raid at Cabanatuan, a rescue of Allied POWs in January 1945
