= Baker Memorial Hall =

University of the Philippines Los Baños Charles Fuller Baker Memorial Hall
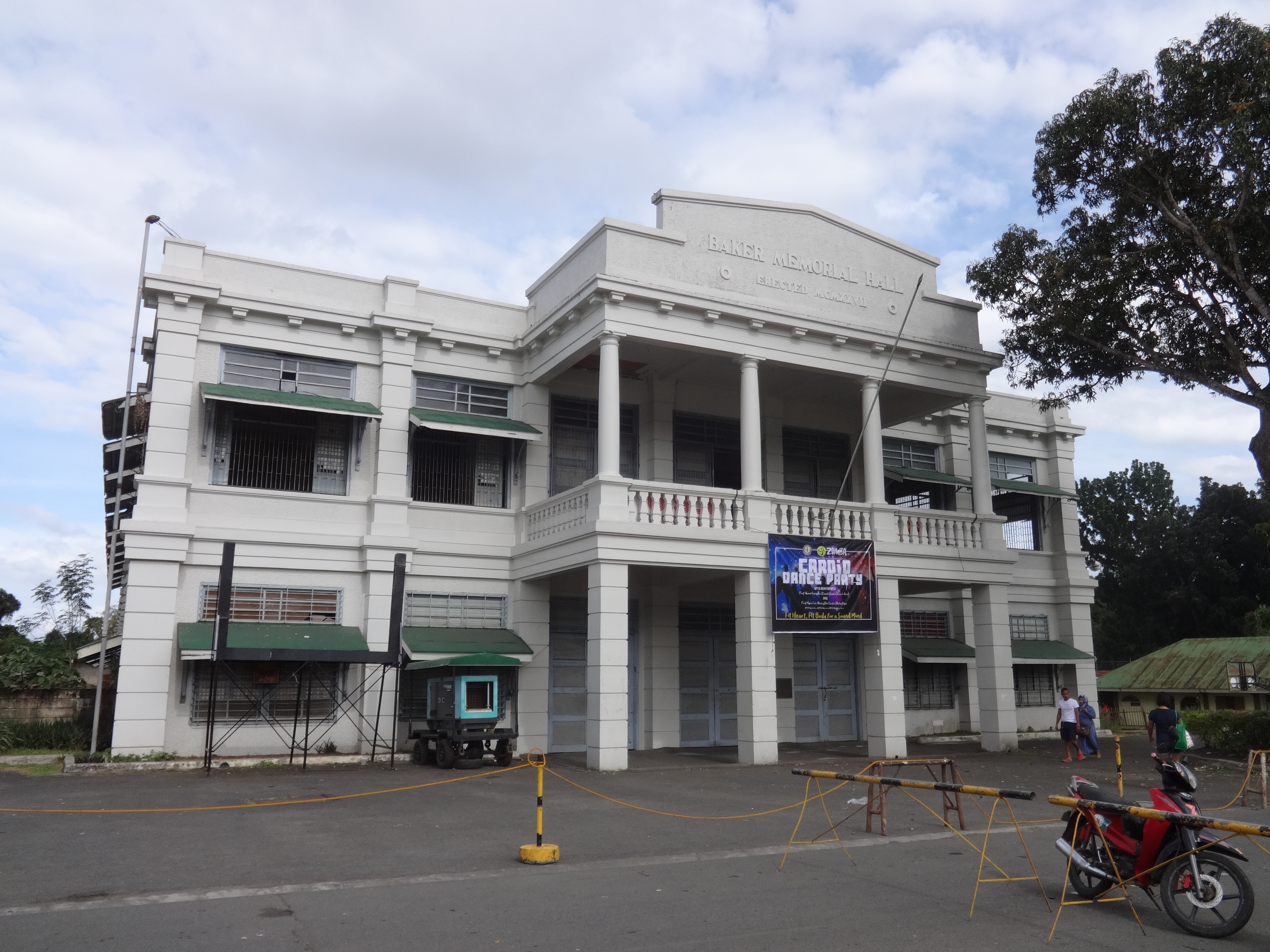
- Baker Hall

- Location within Laguna Location within Luzon Location within Philippines
- Alternative names: Baker Memorial Hall; Baker Hall

General information
- Status: Existing
- Type: Educational Building
- Location: Mangga cor. Chico Road, UPLB Campus, Los Baños, Laguna, Philippines
- Coordinates: 14.161801°N 121.242708°E
- Owner: University of the Philippines Los Baños

Technical details
- Material: Cement, Wood
- Floor count: Two

The Charles Fuller Baker Memorial Hall, also known as Baker Memorial Hall or simply Baker Hall, is one of the oldest buildings on the campus of University of the Philippines Los Baños and the oldest building of the College of Arts and Sciences. Built from 1927 to 1938, it is named after Charles Fuller Baker, the second and longest-serving dean, University of the Philippines Los Baños College of Agriculture.

It was part of the Los Baños Internment Camp for American and allied POWs and civilians during the Japanese Occupation of the Philippines during World War II.

It formerly served as the university gymnasium and home of the Department of Human Kinetics before the department was transferred to the Edwin Bingham Copeland Gymnasium.

== History ==
The building was originally built under the term of Dean Bienvenido M. Gonzalez from 1927 to 1938.

During World War II, Japanese soldiers occupied Los Baños including the UPLB Campus. Baker Hall was used as an internment camp of around 2,500 American and allied POWs and civilians from 1943 to 1945. To rescue the prisoners, a raid on the Los Banos camp was conducted by joint forces of American and Filipino forces including ROTC Hunters, Hukbalahap 48th Chinese Squadron, President Quezon's own guerrilla unit, Marking's group and other irregular troops on February 23, 1945. Most buildings inside the campus were destroyed during the liberation but Baker Hall survived and remained intact.

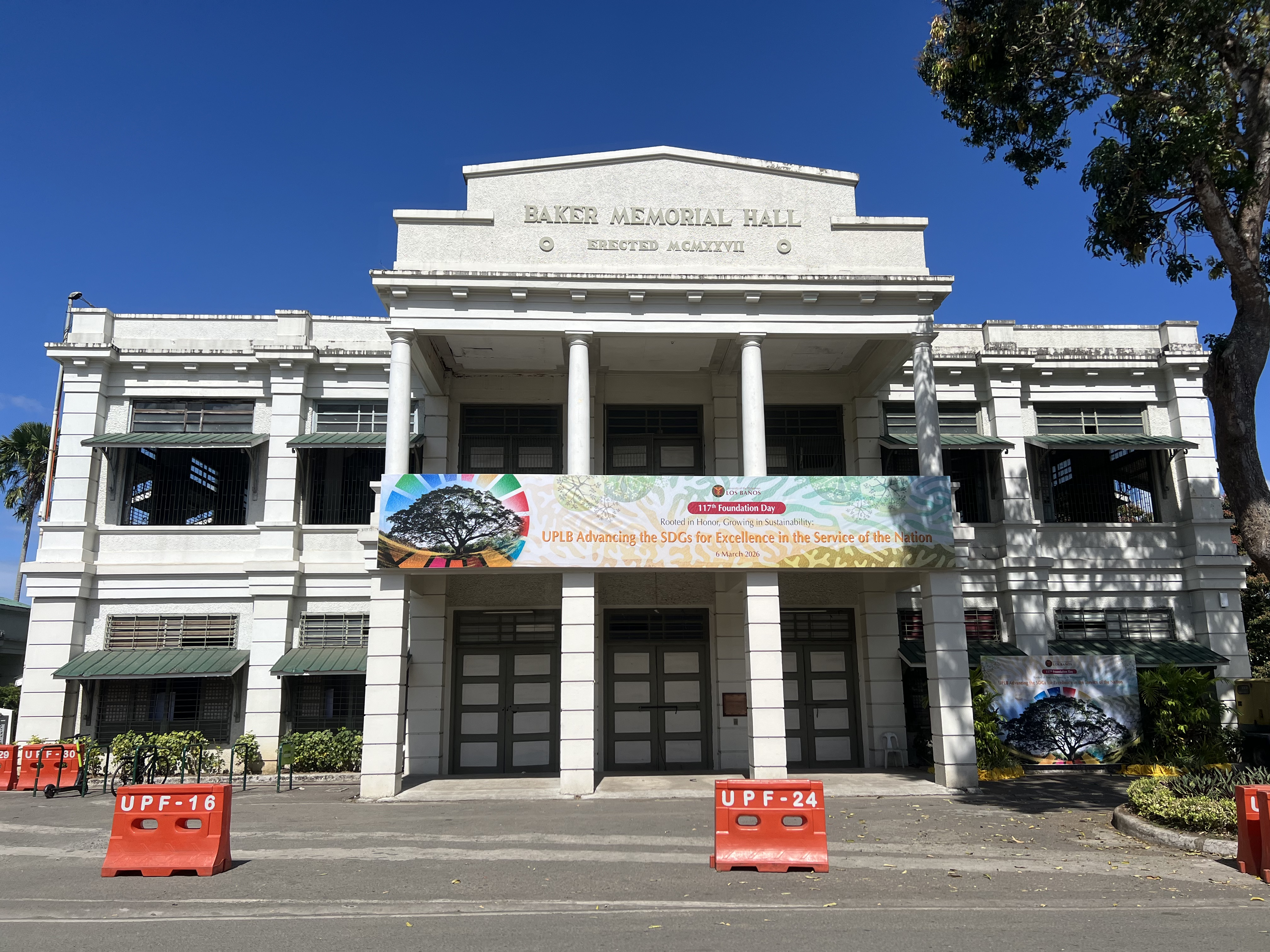
Baker Hall in 2026

After the war, Baker Hall then became the home of UPLB athletes and the university gymnasium. The Department of Human Kinetics of the College of Arts and Sciences which administers the physical education courses of the university was based there. The hall has a volleyball, badminton, basketball court and dance studios inside including an archery range, swimming pool and tennis court. It is also used for concerts, theaters, exhibits and other university events such as the graduation ball and the university convocation for freshmen. Starting point of fun runs held inside the campus usually starts and ends in Baker Hall. In 2010, the university gym was moved to a more spacious Edwin Bingham Copeland Gymnasium. Although PE classes are held in the new gymnasium, Baker Hall is still used for other PE classes such as swimming and tennis.

Current plans include converting Baker Hall into a museum. During the term of Chancellor Luis Rey Velasco, the plan was to integrate the hall into the Mariang Makiling Eco-Tourism Village under the Tourism Master Plan.

== Declaration as a Historic Site ==
The National Historical Institute (now National Historical Commission of the Philippines) declared it as a historic site and installed a historical marker entitled Pook ng Bilangguang Kampo sa Los Baños on February 23, 2005, the 60th commemoration of the Raid at Los Baños.
