= Sadaaki Konishi =

Japanese officer, war criminal 1916–1949

- 小西 貞明
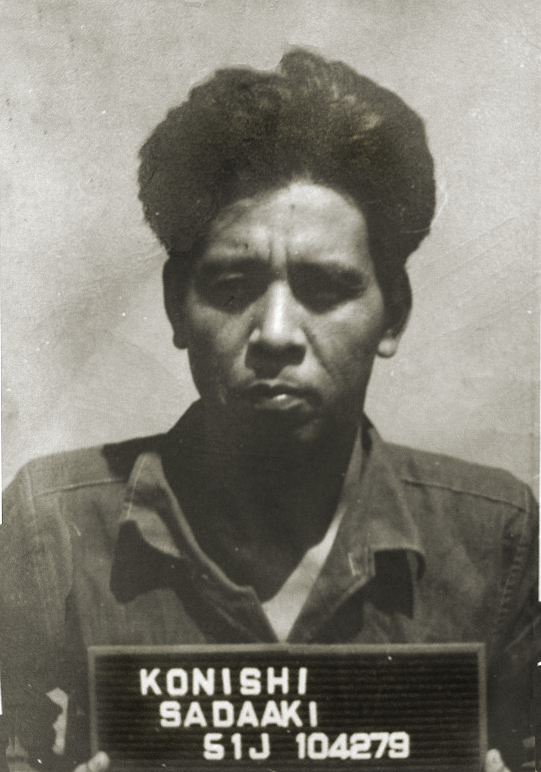
- Konishi in U.S. custody
- Born: January 19, 1916; Fukuoka, Kyushu, Japan
- Died: April 30, 1949 (aged 33); Sugamo Prison, Tokyo, Japan
- Status: Executed by hanging
- Conviction: War crimes
- Penalty: Death
- Military career
- Allegiance: Empire of Japan
- Branch: Imperial Japanese Army
- Rank: Lieutenant
- Units: Kudo unit, Saito battalion, 17th infantry regiment, 8th infantry division
- Commands: Kudo unit
- Conflicts: World War II; Raid at Los Baños

Sadaaki Konishi (小西 貞明, Konishi Sadaaki; January 19, 1916 – April 30, 1949) was a lieutenant in the Imperial Japanese Army during the Second World War.

== Biography ==
Konishi was a lieutenant in the IJA, and was the second-in-command over an internment camp at the University of the Philippines at Los Baños in Laguna Province, Philippines.

He was cruel to the prisoners interned there, whom he deliberately starved. Konishi would withhold salt in order to give cramps to the internees, and cut off the food rations for all of the people who were held there as prisoners. He went so far as to dump a truck load of fruit on the asphalt behind the camp, telling the prisoners that if they wanted any food, they would have to go to the ground and eat it. But in the extreme 110 °F (43 °C) heat, the fruit rotted in the pile, and it was well beyond scavenging. This was because of his racism, as one internee told US interviewers that he called himself the "strongest white race hater in the army".

On February 23, 1945, units of the U.S. 11th Airborne Division, the 503d Infantry Regiment (United States) and the Filipino guerillas attacked the camp, trying to liberate most of the prisoners. Most of the prisoners were extricated, but Konishi escaped. He returned a few days later with a force of men, but by then the camp was empty. The Japanese massacred some 1,500 men, women, and children in adjacent towns which they suspected of collaborating with the liberators. Konishi later admitted that he'd helped plan this massacre. After the war, he was tried for and convicted of war crimes by an American military tribunal in the Philippines. The charges against him included the starvation deaths of over 300 prisoners of war and ordering the killings of three American civilians. Konishi was sentenced to death. He was later transported to Japan, where he was executed by hanging in 1949.

== See also ==
- Raid on Los Baños

== Bibliography ==
- Detailed narratives, from documents, about his conduct as commander in Los Baños, his trial, his incarceration and execution, and the misinformation about his fate are available in Henderson, Bruce, 2015, Rescue at Los Baños: the most daring prison camp raid of World War II, New York: William Morrow, HarperCollins, 2015. ISBN 978-0-06-232506-8. ISBN 978-0-06-240329-2.
