= University of the Philippines Los Baños College of Forestry and Natural Resources =

Forestry school of the University of the Philippines Los Baños

- Type: Constituent college
- Established: April 19, 1910
- Affiliations: Asia Pacific of Forestry Research Institutions, Philippine Agroforestry Education and Research Network
- Dean: Marlo Mendoza
- Academic staff: 56
- Students: 487
- Undergraduates: 393
- Postgraduates: 20
- Location: (Philippines) Los Baños, Laguna, Philippines; 14°9′17″N 121°14′6.25″E
- Website: cfnr.uplb.edu.ph

The University of the Philippines Los Baños College of Forestry and Natural Resources (also referred to as CFNR) is one of the 11 degree-granting units of the University of the Philippines Los Baños (UPLB). It started as the Forest School under the UP College of Agriculture in 1910, making it the oldest forestry school in the Philippines. It is one of the five founding units of UPLB upon its establishment in 1972.

The college has been identified as a "Center of Excellence" in forestry by the Philippine Commission on Higher Education since January 2000. CFNR offers one undergraduate degree program (Bachelor of Science in Forestry) along with four other graduate degree programs and one two-year certificate program. Two of its professors, including one of its deans, are members of the Intergovernmental Panel for Climate Change, the 2007 recipient of the Nobel Peace Prize.

== History ==
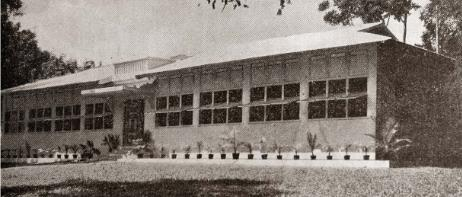
The School of Forestry building was built in commemoration of the school's 20th anniversary.

CFNR traces its roots to the Forest School founded on April 14, 1910, through an Act 1989 by the Insular Government of the Philippines and efforts by Secretary of the Interior, Dean Conant Worcester. It was originally established as a department in the newly established of the College of Agriculture, and all of its early faculty were from the Bureau of Forestry. The Forest School became independent of the College of Agriculture in February 1916 through Act 2578. Since then directors of the bureau had acted as ex officio deans of the school. The Forest School changed its name to School of Forestry in 1924 by effect of Act 3095.

Arthur Frederick Fischer, the School of Forestry's first dean, retired as director of the Bureau of Forestry in February 1936. He was replaced by Florencio Tamesis who became the School of Forestry's second dean, as well as its first Filipino dean.

During the Second World War the campus was used as an internment camp for American civilians then in the Philippines. Largely as a result of the liberation of the campus during the Raid on Los Baños, all the School of Forestry buildings, including student and faculty houses, were destroyed. Large parts of the Makiling Forest Reserve, which is administered by the school were likewise damaged. Only four faculty including Tamesis and silviculture professor Teodoro C. Delizo, along with five students returned upon the resumption of classes. Classes were held under trees until its buildings could be reconstructed through the help of war reparation funds worth ₱59,300 (about US$30,000 in 1946).

The School of Forestry became the College of Forestry on June 14, 1949, by effect of RA 352, with the College of Forestry finally separated from the Bureau of Forestry in 1957, effectively putting it under direct administration of the University of the Philippines.

In 1954 the College of Forestry signed an agreement with Cornell University for providing academic and financial assistance. The College of Forestry received visiting professors from Cornell and grants that were used for construction and forestry research, while faculty and students were awarded scholarships for pursuing master's degrees at US universities.

Domingo M. Lantican became the dean of the College of Forestry in May 1966. Lantican implemented a 5-year campus development program which included construction of new buildings and designating areas for dormitories and staff housing.

The College of Forestry was reorganized to become the College of Forestry and Natural Resources on June 25, 1998. Since 2004 the event has been celebrated in concurrence with the Philippine Arbor Day, a nationwide event marked by extensive tree planting.

== Campus ==
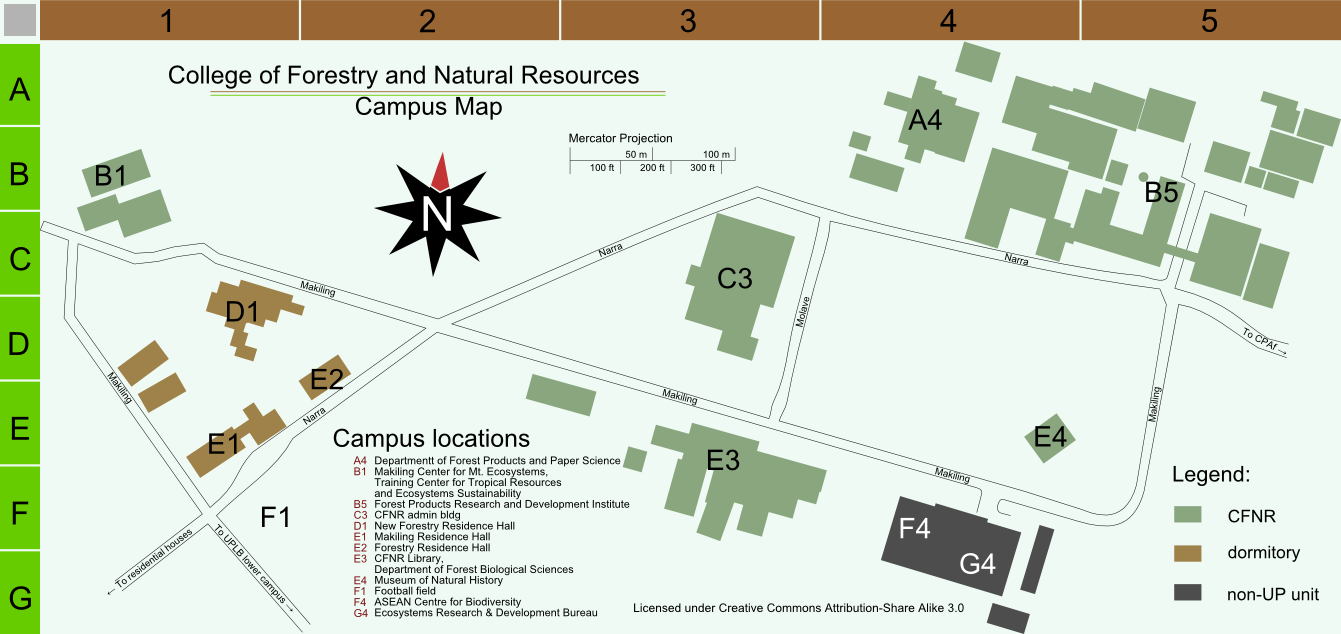
CNFR Campus map (click to enlarge)

The campus of the College of Forestry and Natural Resources, referred to as the "upper campus", is situated on the northeastern slope of Mount Makiling. The campus contains academic buildings, dormitories, hosted institutions (such as the ASEAN Center for Biodiversity), and the 4,347-hectare Makiling Forest Reserve (MFR), which serves as an outdoor laboratory for forestry students and is believed to contain more tree species than the continental United States.

Aside from being the location of the college, the MFR is also the site of the College of Public Affairs, National Arts Center, Philippine High School for the Arts, the venue of the National Jamboree of the Boy Scouts of the Philippines (BSP), the Center for Philippine Raptors and the Bureau of Plant Industry-Makiling Botanic Gardens, one of the oldest parts of the campus. The gardens occupy the site where the tents were used as classrooms during the first four months of the university.

The MFR serves as an outdoor laboratory to students, primarily of the College of Forestry and Natural Resources. ₱5 million (US$156,000) was designated for its conservation and development in 2011. The MFR was created in 1910 under the Bureau of Forestry. Jurisdiction over the MFR was transferred to the UP in 1960. NAPOCOR acquired complete jurisdiction of the MFR, however, in 1987 as part of the Philippines' energy development program under President Corazon Aquino. The MFR was returned to UPLB three years later by effect of RA 6967. In 2008 representative Del De Guzman of the 2nd district of Makati filed HB 1143 which, if passed into law, would have transferred jurisdiction of the MFR to the Boy Scouts of the Philippines. The bill was strongly opposed by the UPLB, citing possible mismanagement and deforestation of the site if placed under the BSP among others.

== Organization and administration ==
University of the Philippines Los Baños College of Forestry and Natural Resources Deans
Name	Tenure in office
Arthur Frederick Fischer	1917–1936
Florencio Tamesis	1937–1953
Felipe Amos	1954
Calixto Mabesa	1955–1958
Gregorio Zamuco	1959–1966
Domingo Lantican	1966–1972
Romulo Del Castillo	1972–1978
Celso B. Lantican	1978–1987
Juan Adolfo Revilla	1987–1989
Virgilio Fernandez	1989–1995
Lucrecio Rebugio	1995–2001
Ramon Razal	2002–2008
Rex Victor O. Cruz	2008–2012
Juan M. Pulhin	2012–2015
Willie P. Abasolo	2015-2021
Marlo D. Mendoza	2021–
References

The College of Forestry and Natural Resources is managed by a dean, who is appointed by the UP Board of Regents, and assisted by an associate dean. Prior to the college's separation from the Bureau of Forestry in 1957, the deans of the College of Forestry and its predecessors were not appointed by the board but were the directors of the Bureau of Forestry acting as ex officio heads of the college. Due to the distance of the Bureau of Forestry in Manila from the Forest School in Los Baños (about 64 kilometers), directors of the bureau appointed foresters-in-charge to manage the school, a practice which continued until 1957.

The College of Forestry and Natural Resources is a founding member of the Asia Pacific of Forestry Research Institutions, and the CFNR Institute of Agroforestry is a member of the Philippine Agroforestry Education and Research Network.

== Academics ==
CFNR offers one undergraduate degree program (Bachelor of Science in Forestry), four graduate degree programs and one certificate program. It started offering master's and doctor's degrees in 1966 and 1973, respectively. The college produces about 100 graduates every year and has been identified as a "Center of Excellence" in forestry by the Philippine Commission on Higher Education since January 2000.

Admission to the BS Forestry program is done through the University of the Philippines College Admission Test, while a Certificate in Forestry applicants are screened by a test administered by CFNR. Admission to graduate programs are managed by the Graduate School. Of its 394 students in 2008, 61 and 295 were enrolled in its Certificate in Forestry and BS Forestry programs, respectively, while the rest are in its graduate degree programs. As of 2009 it had 393 students enrolled in all of its programs. 38 of its faculty hold PhDs.

While all of its 20 students when the Forest School opened were male, more than 60% of the students of the college were female as of 2003. Women first enrolled in the college in 1951. Other forestry schools in the Philippines have also experienced a similar increase in female enrollment.

Board exam performance
Year	NP^{[a]}	PR^{[b]}	TN^{[c]}	PI^{[d]}
2010	42.10%	95.00%	6	48
2009	36.55%	84.00%	4	47
2008	51.19%	97.00%	4	43
Mean	43.26%	92.49%	–	46
Notes: 1. National passing rate 2. CFNR passing rate 3. Number of CFNR examinees in the top ten 4. Number of participating institutions

The graduates of the college has maintained substantially good performance in the forestry license exams conducted by the Professional Regulation Commission. For instance, the mean passing rates of its graduates in the exams for the years 2008–2010 is 92.49%. This is almost double of the mean national passing rate for the same period. Furthermore, six of its graduates belonged to the top ten best performing students in the 2010 exam, while four belonged to the top ten in both 2008 and 2009 exams. (see table)

=== Libraries and collections ===
The CFNR Library holds about 30,000 publications which mostly focus on forestry and related disciplines. The library has a floor area of 974.64 sq. m, and is open 40 hours a week.

The Museum of Natural History of the University of the Philippines Los Baños, established in 1976, is located in the campus. It holds over 200,000 biological specimens; including half of the samplings from the Philippine Water Bug Inventory Project. More than half of the museum's specimens are in its entomological collection. While most of the museum's collections are in its main building, some are housed in other UPLB units.

=== Research ===
In 2002 the college had 94 researchers working in its eight research units. This includes the Makiling Center for Mountain Ecosystems, believed to be the first institution in the Philippines devoted to the study of mountain ecology. It also manages the Makiling Forest Reserve and has launched programs promoting its conservation.

The Forest Products Research and Development Institute, founded as the Forest Products Laboratory under the Bureau of Forestry in 1954, is hosted in the campus. Managed by the Department of Science and Technology of the government of the Philippines, it is engaged in paper science and bioenergy research, among others. It has also generated technologies such as those for biomass energy generation and construction. Its facilities, believed to be the "largest and best equipped in the eastern hemisphere" by the time of its construction, were patterned after the University of Wisconsin's Forest Products Laboratory. It was built using US grants worth US$239,552 and funding from the Philippine government worth ₱518,000 (US$12,000). It had a total budget of almost ₱87 million (US$2.01 million) in 2011, with about ₱51 million (US$1.18 million) of this appropriated for research.

== Extension ==
The Training Center for Tropical Resources and Ecosystems Sustainability, established in June 1998 by the UP Board of Regents, offers more than 300 training programs in forest and land management, logging, and related disciplines. It has a satellite office in Baguio which offers similar programs. Its programs are designed for professionals in working in the agroforestry-related disciplines and the wood industry.
