= Dioscoro L. Umali =

Filipino agriculturist

Dioscoro L. Umali ONS

7th Dean of University of the Philippines Los Baños College of Agriculture and Food Science
- In office 1959–1969
- Preceded by: Leopoldo B. Uichanco
- Succeeded by: Faustino T. Orillo

1st Director of the Southeast Asian Regional Center for Graduate Study and Research in Agriculture
- In office 1967–1971
- Preceded by: Position established
- Succeeded by: Jose D. Drilon

Personal details
- Born: Dioscoro L. Umali; November 17, 1917 Biñan, Laguna, Insular Government of the Philippine Islands
- Died: July 1, 1992 (aged 74) Makati, Philippines
- Spouse: Zenaida Lopez-Umali
- Education: Cornell University (PhD) University of the Philippines Los Banos (BS)
- Occupation: Agriculturist
- Known for: Plant breeding
- Awards: Order of National Scientists of the Philippines (1986)

Dioscoro Lopez Umali (November 17, 1917 – July 1, 1992) was a Filipino agriculturalist and National Scientist of the Philippines awardee, known as "the Father of Philippine Plant Breeding." He was awarded several international honors and distinctions for his outstanding achievements and improvements of rice, corn and other economic plants. The International Rice Research Institute named a laboratory in his honor.

== Early life ==
Dioscoro "Diosing" Umali was born on November 17, 1917, and grew up in Binan, Laguna, the hometown of his mother, Edilberta Gana-Lopez. His father, Captain Cesario Umali, a merchant marine, died in Barcelona, Spain, when Umali was 4 years old and his brother, Telesforo Umali, was 2. His mother provided for the family by selling rice at the local palengke after his father's death. He moved to Manila to enroll in West Torres High School (Note: Now Torres High School.) and completed his secondary education there in 3 years, despite his multiple extracurricular activities.

== Education ==
Umali initially wanted to enroll in the US Naval Academy and become a merchant marine like his father. However, he decided to enroll in the University of the Philippines College of Agriculture (UPCA) (Note: Now University of the Philippines Los Baños College of Agriculture and Food Science.) and pursue a Bachelor of Science in Agriculture to lessen the worries of his mother.

After completing his BSA in 1939, he joined the university staff as an instructor. He was then sent to Cornell University in 1946 to pursue a PhD in Genetics and Plant Breeding as a University Fellow, which he completed in 1949.

== Career ==
=== Abacá ===
In the UPCA Department of Agronomy, along with students and fellow colleagues, Umali researched the relatives of Abacá, a plant native to the Philippines commonly used in textiles. He and his team were able to produce hybrids of the plant that were immune to the abaca bunchy top and abaca bract mosaic viruses by crossbreeding the plant with relatives immune to such diseases.

== Personal life ==
He married Zenaida Lopez and had 5 children, Dioscoro Jr., Irma, Rico, Dina and Celia Umali.

Umali died on July 1, 1992, at the Makati Medical Center. He remains were interred at the Los Baños Municipal Cemetery in Laguna.

== Bibliography ==
- Tecson-Mendoza, Evelyn Mae (2022). Dioscoro L. Umali (PDF). Transactions NAST PHL. ISSN 2815-2042.
