= University of the Philippines Los Baños Graduate School =

Graduate school in the Philippines

University of the Philippines Graduate School
- Type: Constituent college
- Established: 1972
- Dean: Dr. Jomar F. Rabajante
- Location: Los Baños, Laguna, Philippines
- Website: gs.uplb.edu.ph

The UPLB Graduate School (also known as GS) is a professional graduate school and is one of the eleven degree-granting units of the University of the Philippines Los Baños. Located in Los Baños, Laguna, the school also integrates and administers graduate programs of the university in agriculture, forestry, the basic sciences (e.g. biology and chemistry), mathematics and statistics, development economics and management, agrarian studies and human ecology. It is responsible for the implementation of the policies, rules, and regulations of the graduate faculty in the university.

== History ==
The graduate school started in 1913 when the UP College of Agriculture (now UP College of Agriculture and Food Science) offered graduate programs of Master of Science in Agricultural Chemistry. The University Graduate School was established by the UP Board of Regents on October 26, 1950 and is mandated to administer the graduate programs in the Los Baños unit through a sub-committee. The UPLB Graduate school was formally established on December 21, 1972 upon the establishment of the autonomous units of the university under the UP System.
