= ASEAN Centre for Biodiversity =

ASEAN organization for the conservation and sustainable use of biological diversity

- Abbreviation: ACB
- Formation: 27 September 2005
- Type: Intergovernmental organization
- Headquarters: Los Baños, Laguna, Philippines
- Key people: Dr. Theresa Mundita S Lim (Executive director)

The ASEAN Centre for Biodiversity (ACB) is an intergovernmental regional centre of excellence that facilitates co-operation and co-ordination among the members of ASEAN, and with relevant national governments, regional and international organisations on the conservation and sustainable use of biological diversity. It is acknowledged as the first regional initiative to save ASEAN's rich but highly threatened biodiversity and is a continuation of the ASEAN Regional Centre for Biodiversity Conservation (ARCBC), which was a joint co-operation project of the ASEAN and European Union (EU), and hosted by the Department of Environment and Natural Resources of the Philippines. The Executive Director of the ASEAN Centre for Biodiversity is Dr Theresa Mundita S Lim.

== Funding ==
From 1999 to 2004, ARCBC successfully established the bridge that fostered strong collaboration among ASEAN Member States (AMS) and between ASEAN and EU partner institutions, and gained recognition in the regional and global arena for biodiversity. A year later in 2005, the ASEAN and EU agreed to establish the ASEAN Centre for Biodiversity to carry on the work of the completed ARCBC project.

The Financing Agreement inked between EU and ASEAN provided the necessary funding for the establishment of ACB. The centre was established primarily to facilitate co-ordination and co-operation among AMS on the sustainable use and conservation of biological diversity. The Agreement on the establishment of the centre was signed by the Environment Ministers of Brunei, Cambodia, Indonesia, Laos, Malaysia, Myanmar, the Philippines, Thailand, Singapore and Vietnam on behalf of their respective governments.

== Government relations ==
The National Biodiversity Centre represents Singapore in the ASEAN Centre for Biodiversity and is the national agency involved in biodiversity conservation and research in Singapore.

== Launch ==
ACB was launched at the 9th Informal ASEAN Ministerial Meeting on 27 September 2005. The Agreement also established the ASEAN Biodiversity Fund with voluntary contributions of the AMS, other governments and organisations as approved by the Governing Board. The Fund is to be utilised to meet the expenses of the centre and its various initiatives. President Gloria Macapagal Arroyo recommended to the senate the ratification of the Host Country Agreement (HCA) between the Government of the Republic of the Philippines and the ASEAN Centre for Biodiversity. Signed on 8 August 2006 in Manila, the HCA provides that the Philippines shall be the Host Country for the ACB which is currently headquartered at the University of Philippines in Los Baños, Laguna.

Subject to concurrence by the senate, the Philippine Government will later grant immunities and privileges to ACB and its staff. The Department of Environment and Natural resources, the Department of Finance, the Bureau of Immigration, the Department of Transportation and Communication (DOTC), Bangko Sentral ng Pilipinas, and the University of the Philippines Los Baños have endorsed the ratification of the HCA.

== Focus and scope ==
Ahmed Djoghlaf, executive secretary of the United Nations Convention on Biological Diversity (CBD), calls ACB "a unique mechanism that uses the bottom-top approach to deal with the biodiversity loss problem."

Now on its 41st year, the ASEAN has resolved to further strengthen its commitment to protect its biodiversity from degradation. "As part of the ASEAN action to save the region’s biodiversity, the countries declared 27 areas as ASEAN Heritage Parks and designated 1,523 protected areas based on the World Conservation Union (IUCN) category," Executive Director Rodrigo Fuentes said. He added that "promoting national and regional cooperation to address measures related to environmental agreements, and establishing a regional database containing an inventory of the region’s biological resources are also part of the action to curb biodiversity loss."
