= University of the Philippines Los Baños College of Agriculture and Food Science =

Agricultural school in Los Baños, Philippines

- Type: Constituent college
- Established: March 6, 1909
- Dean: Elpidio M. Agbisit Jr.
- Faculty: 112
- Students: 1,429
- Undergraduates: 1,212
- Postgraduates: 217
- Location: (Philippines) Los Baños, Laguna, Philippines (main campus); 14°9′59.8″N 121°14′35.9″E
- Hymn: The College Hymn
- Colors: Green and gold
- Student Moniker: Aggies (Gender Neutral)
- Website: https://cafs.uplb.edu.ph/

The University of the Philippines Los Baños College of Agriculture and Food Science (also referred to as UPLB CAFS), formerly named University of the Philippines College of Agriculture or UPLB CA, is one of the 11 degree-granting units of the University of the Philippines Los Baños. Founded in 1909 as the University of the Philippines College of Agriculture, it is the oldest constituent of UPLB, and is one of the four founding units of the university upon its establishment in 1972.

The college offers 4 undergraduate degree programs while its graduate programs are offered through the Graduate School. It is involved in active research in agriculture and biotechnology focusing on the development of high-yielding and pest-resistant crops. In recognition of its work, it received the Ramon Magsaysay Award for International Understanding in 1977. Moreover, it is identified by the Commission on Higher Education as a "Center of Excellence" in agriculture.

Enrollment in the BS Agriculture program has been in decline, with 51% of UPLB students enrolled in the program in 1980 down to 43% in 1995. CAFS programs also have a substantially low no-show rate, with only 56% and 38% of qualifiers opting to enroll in the BS Agriculture and BS Agricultural Chemistry programs, respectively. The trend is similar nationwide with BS Agriculture programs offered by higher education institutes in the country having the least enrollment.

== History ==
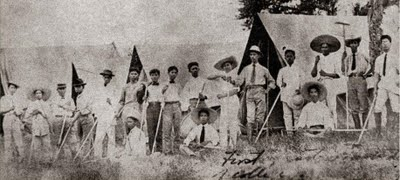
Classes were first held in tents.

To educate farmers in better farming methods, the University of the Philippines Board of Regents purchased 72.63 hectares of land on the foot of Mount Makiling near Manila for the establishment of an agricultural school with Edwin Copeland as its first dean. Classes began in June 1909 with Copeland, Harold Cuzner, Edgar Ledyard, Carrie Ledyard, and Sam Durham as professors and twelve students initially enrolled in the program. Charles F. Baker replaced Copeland as dean in 1917 and oversaw the construction of new buildings and the acquisition of a 300-hectare Agricultural Experiment Station. Upon Baker's death in 1927, Bienvenido Gonzales became UPCA's first Filipino dean.

During the Japanese occupation of the Philippines beginning in 1941, UPCA was closed and converted into an internment camp for Americans and other enemy nationals, and into a headquarters of the Japanese army. For three years, the college was home to more than 2,000 civilians, mostly Americans, who could no longer be imprisoned in the Santo Tomas Internment Camp. In 1945, as part of the liberation of the Philippines, the US Army sent 130 11th Airborne Division paratroopers to Los Baños to rescue the internees. Only 4 paratroopers and 2 Filipino guerillas were killed in the raid. However, Japanese reinforcements arrived two days later, destroying UPCA facilities and killing some 1,500 Filipino civilians in Los Baños soon afterwards.

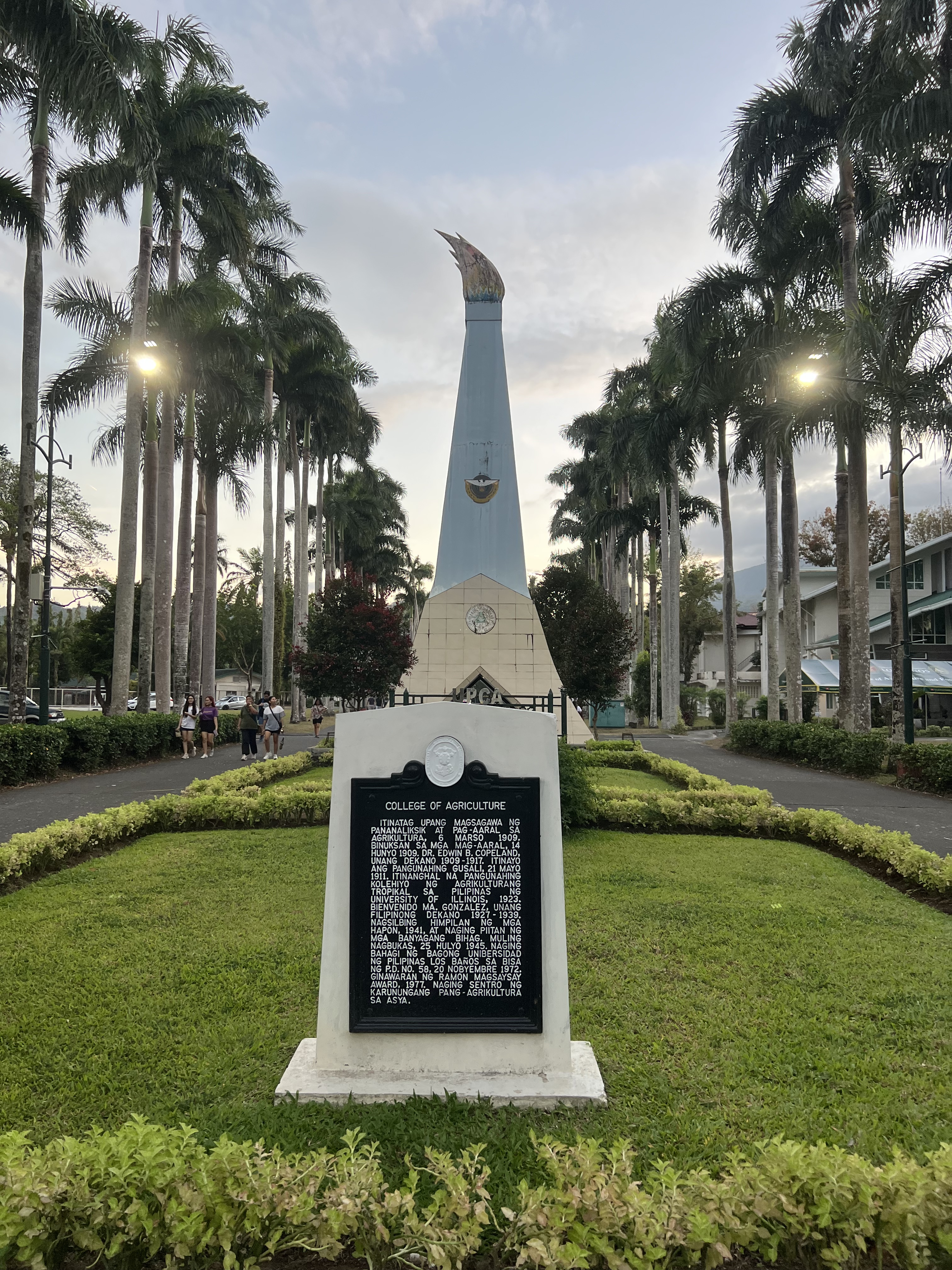
NHC historical marker with the Academic Heritage Monument at the background

UPCA became the first unit of the University of the Philippines to open after the war when it resumed classes on July 25, 1945, with Leopoldo Uichanco as dean. Only 125 (16%) of the original students enrolled. Likewise, only 38 professors returned to teach. UPCA used its ₱470,546 (US$10,800) share in the Philippine-US War Damage Funds (released in 1947) for reconstruction.

Further financial endowment from United States Agency for International Development (USAID) and the Mutual Security Agency (MSA) allowed the construction of new facilities while scholarship grants, mainly from the Rockefeller Foundation and the International Cooperation Administration-National Economic Council, paved way for the training of UPCA faculty. From 1947 to 1958, a total of 146 faculty members had been granted MS and PhD scholarships in US universities.

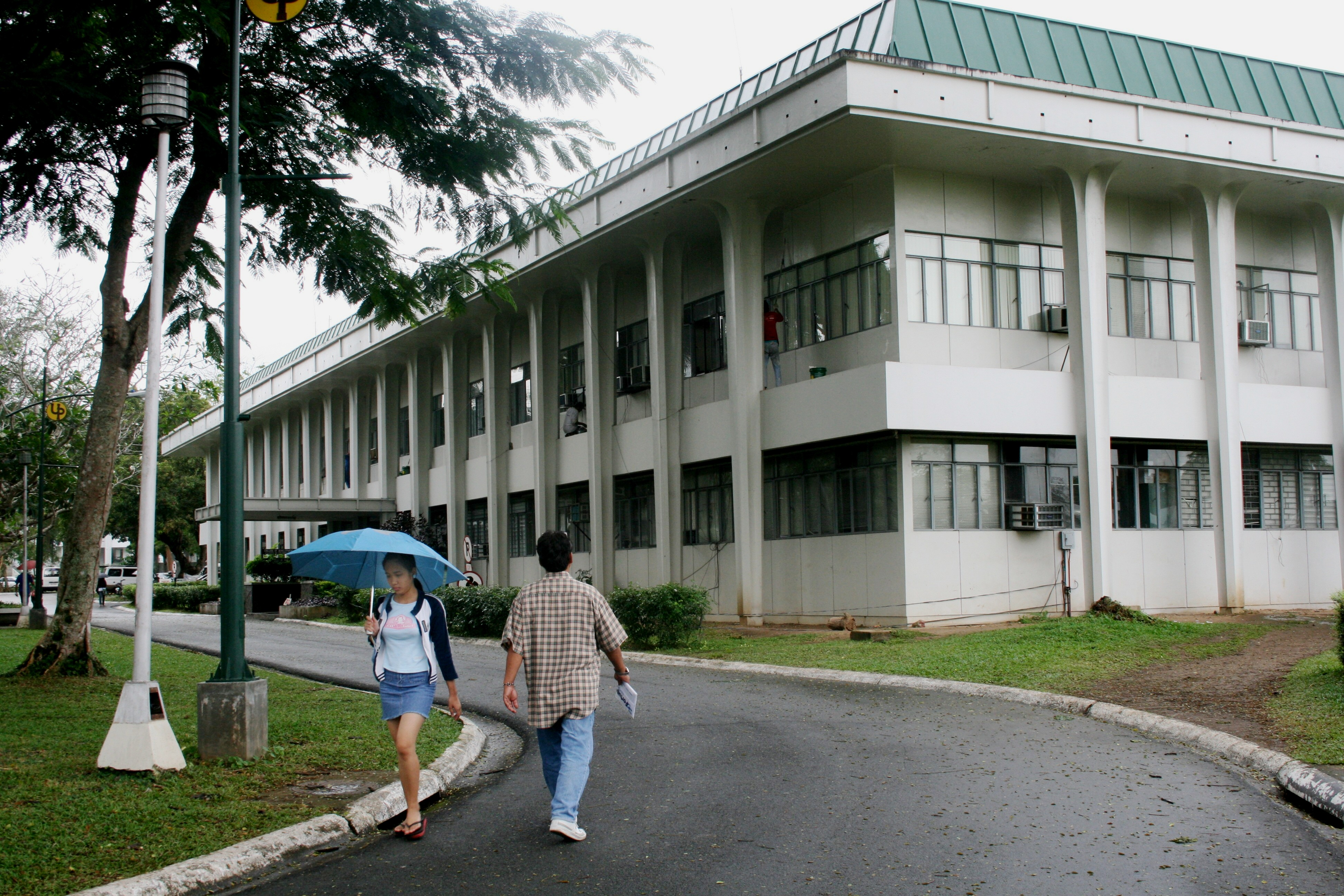
The Department of Agricultural Information and Communication building (now College of Development Communication) was built under Umali's Five-Year Development Program.

On July 1, 1952, UPCA signed a contract with Cornell University regarding assistance for post-war development. Cornell sent 51 professors, 35 of which were from Cornell, to assist in UPCA research. It also financed the construction of new buildings and provided new equipment. As part of the program, UPCA sent 83 of its faculty members to the United States and other countries for training. Among them was Dioscoro Umali who received his PhD in Genetics at Cornell. He would succeed Uichanco as dean upon his death in October 1959. Umali's administration oversaw the Department of Food Science and Technology. New facilities were also constructed under his Five-Year Development Program.

In 1972, UPCA requested Philippine President Ferdinand Marcos to allow the college to secede from the University of the Philippines due to the alleged withholding of its budget and the disapproval of curricular proposals. However, UP President Salvador P. Lopez strongly opposed the idea. A survey also found that there was very little support for complete independence at UPCA. As a compromise, Lopez proposed the transformation of UP into a system of autonomous constituent universities. Finally, on November 20, 1972, PD No. 58 was signed, establishing UPLB as UP's first autonomous campus, with UPCA, College of Forestry, Agricultural Credit and Cooperatives Institute, Dairy Training and Research Institute, and the Diliman-based Agrarian Reform Institute as its first academic units.

A few weeks after the declaration of UPLB's autonomy in 1972, several CA departments and institutes were separated to form the College of Basic Sciences and Humanities, the predecessor of the College of Arts and Sciences. Likewise, 154 faculty members were transferred to the new college.

CA acquired 288 hectares of land in La Carlota, Negros Occidental in May 1964 by effect of Proclamation 250 of President Diosdado Macapagal. Previous legislations have also allocated land area and funding for the grant but were never implemented however. It currently hosts the PCARRD-DOST La Granja Agricultural Research Center, which serves as a research center for various upland crops, and a station of the Philippine Carabao Center. It also serves as a training site for CA students and other schools in the region.

== Organization and administration ==
University of the Philippines Los Baños College of Agriculture and Food Science Deans
| Name | Length of office |
| Edwin Copeland | 1907–1917 |
| Charles Fuller Baker | 1917–1927 |
| Bienvenido M. Gonzales | 1927–1938 |
| Leopoldo B. Uichanco | 1939–1943; 1945-1959 |
| Francisco O. Santos | 1943–1945 |
| Dioscoro L. Umali | 1959–1969 |
| Faustino T. Orillo | 1970–1973 |
| Fernando A. Bernardo | 1973–1974 |
| Cledualdo Perez | 1974–1984 |
| Ruben L. Villareal | 1985–1993 |
| Cecilio Arboleda | 1993–1999 |
| Luis Rey I. Velasco | 1999–2002 |
| Candida B. Adalla | 2002–2008 |
| Domingo E. Angeles | 2008–2015 |
| Enrico P. Supangco | 2015–2018 |
| Elpidio M. Agbisit Jr. | 2018-2024 |
| Amado A. Angeles | 2024-Present |
| References |

== See also ==
- University of the Philippines Los Baños
