= List of Upsilon Sigma Phi members =

Members of a fraternity in Asia

The Upsilon Sigma Phi is the oldest Greek-letter organization and fraternity in Asia. It was established in 1918 at the University of the Philippines. The following is a list of some of the notable members of Upsilon Sigma Phi.

== Academia ==
=== Faculty ===
- Romulo Davide (1954) – professor emeritus of University of the Philippines Los Baños; National Scientist of the Philippines for plant pathology and nematology
- José Encarnación Jr. – dean at UP School of Economics; National Scientist of the Philippines for economics
- Armando Malay (1934) – professor and dean at the University of the Philippines and Far Eastern University; journalist and activist
- Serafin Quiason Jr. (1950) – professor of history and chairman of the National Historical Institute

=== Presidents ===
- Danilo Concepcion (1989) – 36th Secretary of Trade and Industry; 21st President of the University of the Philippines; dean of the UP College of Law
- Onofre Corpuz (1947) – 13th President of the University of the Philippines, National Scientist of the Philippines, Minister of Education
- Salvador P. Lopez (1933) – President of the University of the Philippines and Secretary of Foreign Affairs
- Alfredo E. Pascual (1967) – 20th President of the University of the Philippines; Secretary of Trade and Industry

== Art and architecture ==
- Cesar Concio (1926) – architect, first university architect of the University of the Philippines
- Gab Mejia (2016) – photographer
- Pitoy Moreno (1948) – fashion designer

== Business ==
- Jorge L. Araneta (1953) – businessman and chairman of Araneta Group of Companies
- Roberto Benedicto (1936) – owner of the Philippines Daily Express, Radio Philippines Network, Banahaw Broadcasting Corporation, and Intercontinental Broadcasting Corporation; Ambassador to Japan (1972–1978)
- Alfonso Calalang (1921) – Governor of the Central Bank of the Philippines
- Antonio Quirino (1926) – founder of the first television station in the Philippines; chairman of Alto Broadcasting System (now ABS-CBN Corporation)

== Culture and the Arts ==
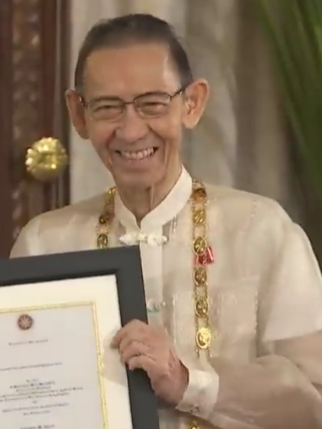
Gemino Abad

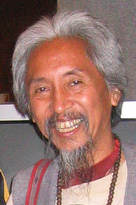
Kidlat Tahimik
- Johnny Alegre (1979) – jazz guitarist and composer
- Angelo Castro Jr. (1966) – ABS-CBN News anchor
- Behn Cervantes (1958) – film director and actor
- Tony Mabesa (1954) – National Artist of the Philippines for theater, actor, and director
- Anthony Pangilinan (1983) – hosted several television and radio programs, including Big News on ABC, BC News Tonight on IBC, A Second Look on RPN (2004), and The Boardroom on CNN Philippines
- Martin del Rosario (2011) – actor
- Kidlat Tahimik (1959) – National Artist of the Philippines for film, film director and actor, founder of AIESEC in the Philippines

== Law ==
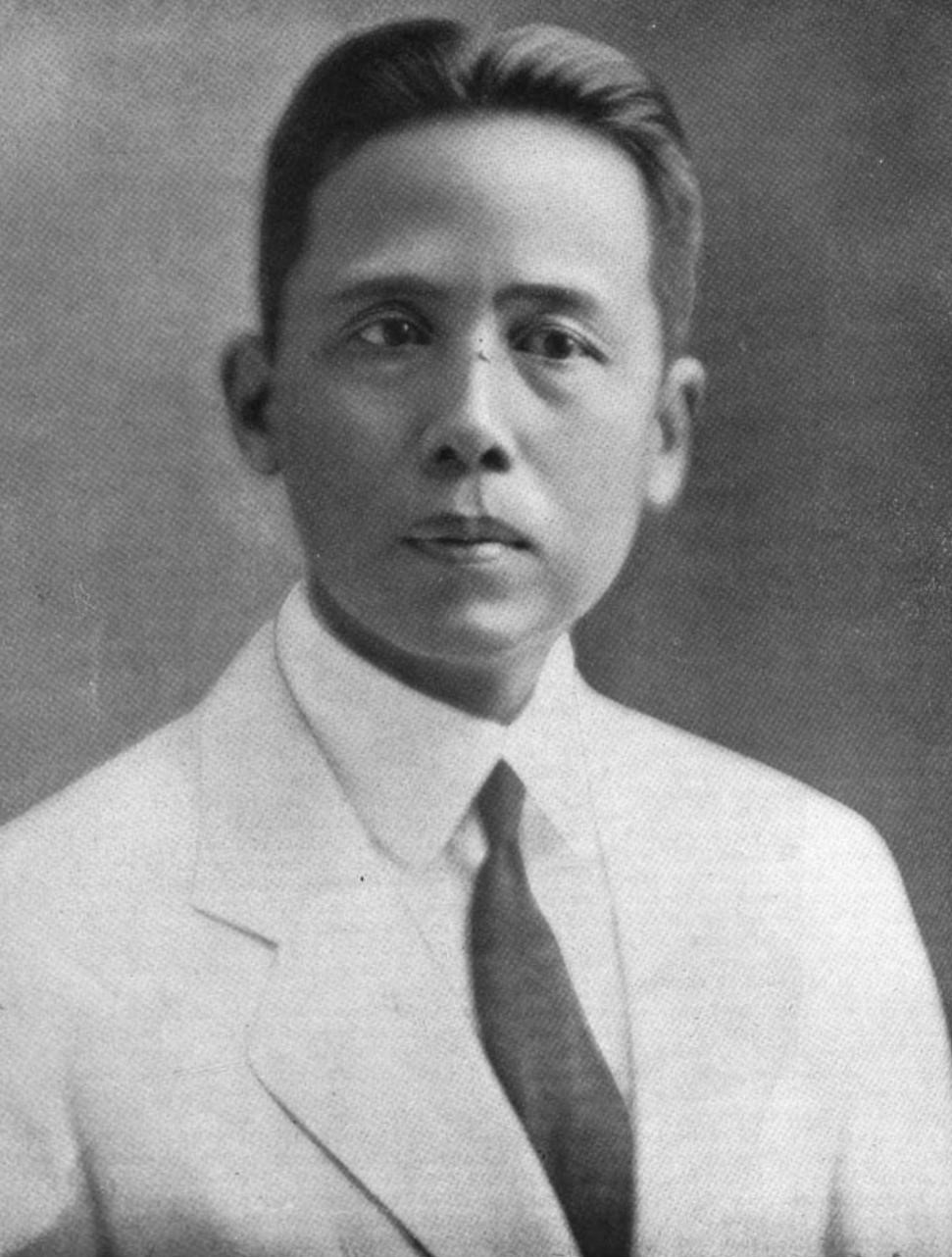
José Abad Santos

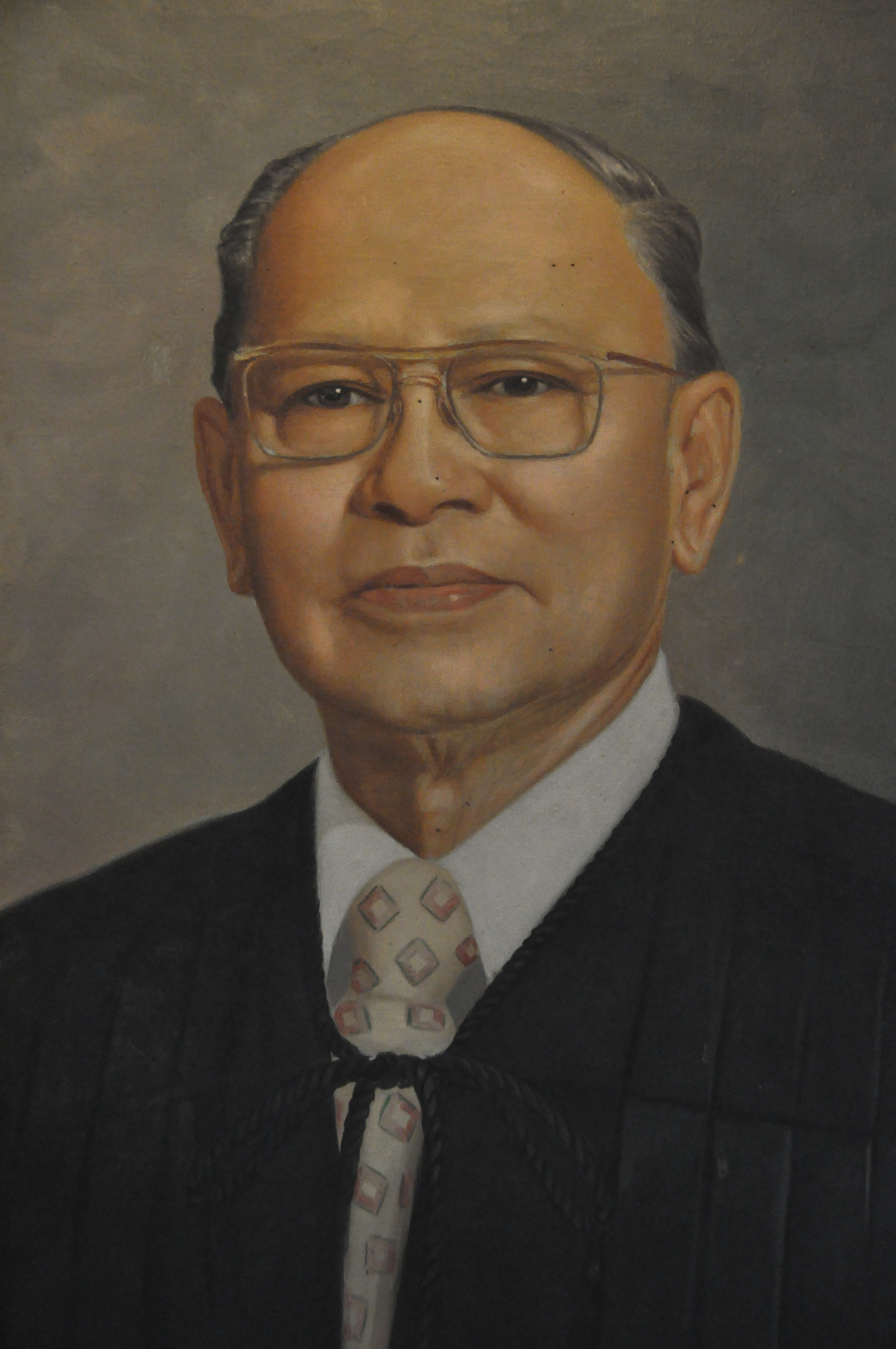
Querube Makalintal

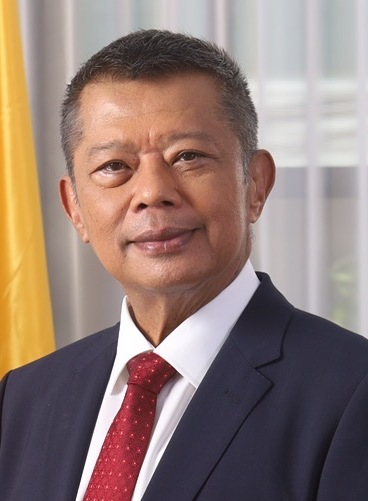
Jesus Crispin Remulla

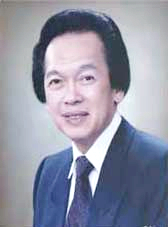
Estelito Mendoza
- Nestor Alampay – Associate Justice of the Supreme Court of the Philippines
- Carmelino G. Alvendia (1926) – associate justice of the Court of Appeals of the Philippines; founder of Quezon City Academy
- Josue Bellosillo – Senior Associate Justice of the Supreme Court of the Philippines
- Hermogenes Concepcion Jr. – Associate Justice of the Supreme Court of the Philippines
- Vicente Ericta (1937) – Associate Justice of the Supreme Court of the Philippines
- Florentino P. Feliciano (1948) – Associate Justice of the Supreme Court of the Philippines; chairman of the Appellate Body of the World Trade Organization
- Enrique Fernando – Chief Justice of the Supreme Court of the Philippines
- Estanislao Fernandez (1931) – Associate Justice of the Supreme Court of the Philippines; Senate of the Philippines, and Constitutional Convention delegate
- Ramon Fernandez – Associate Justice of the Supreme Court of the Philippines
- Ricardo P. Galvez (1952) – Solicitor General of the Philippines
- Emilio Gancayco (1940) – Associate Justice of the Supreme Court of the Philippines
- Querube Makalintal (1930) – Chief Justice of the Supreme Court of the Philippines; Speaker of the House of Representatives, and Solicitor General of the Philippines
- Estelito Mendoza (1947) – Solicitor General of the Philippines and Secretary of Justice
- Camilo Quiason (1947) – Associate Justice of the Supreme Court of the Philippines
- José Abad Santos – 5th Chief Justice of the Supreme Court of the Philippines and Secretary of Justice

== Military and law enforcement ==
- Jolly Bugarin (1937) – director of the National Bureau of Investigation and president of the International Criminal Police Organization (Interpol)
- Gregorio Catapang Jr. (1984) – chief of staff of the Armed Forces of the Philippines (AFP) and director-general of the Bureau of Corrections

== Politics ==
=== Presidents and prime ministers ===
- Jose P. Laurel – 4th President of the Philippines, Senate of the Philippines, associate justice of the Supreme Court of the Philippines
- Salvador Laurel (1947) – Prime Minister of the Philippines, Vice President of the Philippines, Senate of the Philippines, and Secretary of Foreign Affairs
- Ferdinand Marcos (1937) – 10th President of the Philippines, President of the Senate of the Philippines, and Secretary of Defense

=== Executive departments ===
- Dante Canlas – Director-General of the National Economic and Development Authority and professor at the UP School of Economics at the University of the Philippines Diliman
- Edgardo Espiritu (1955) – Secretary of Finance and Philippine Ambassador to the United Kingdom, Ireland, and Iceland
- Ted Herbosa (1978) – Secretary of the Department of Health
- Teodoro Kalaw – Secretary of the Interior; director of the National Library of the Philippines; member of the Philippine Assembly
- Catalino Macaraig Jr. (1947) – Executive Secretary of the Philippines and Minister of Justice
- Rico E. Puno (1974)– Undersecretary of the Department of Interior and Local Government
- Jonvic Remulla (1979) – Secretary of Interior and Local Government and Governor of Cavite

=== Senate ===
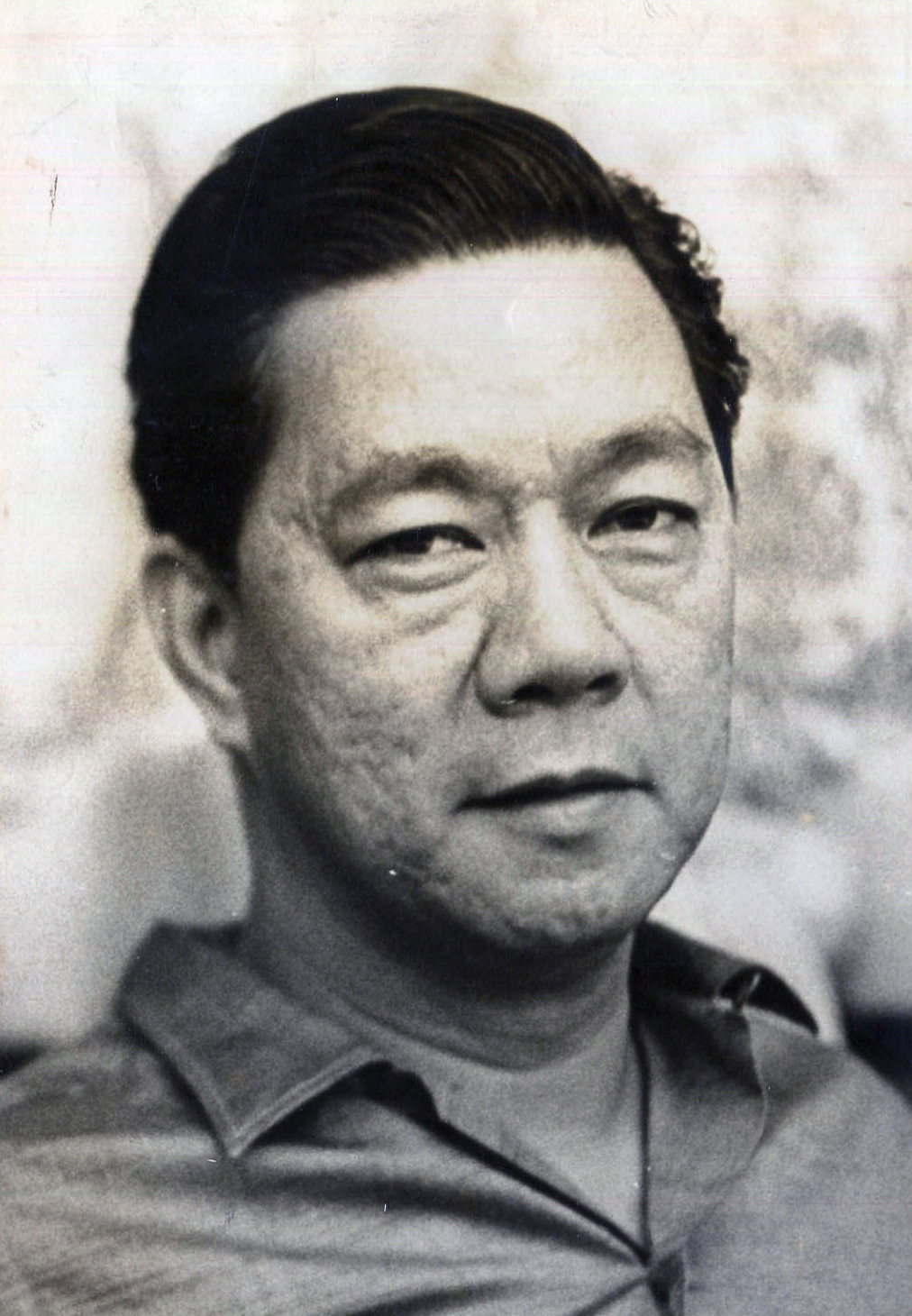
Gil Puyat

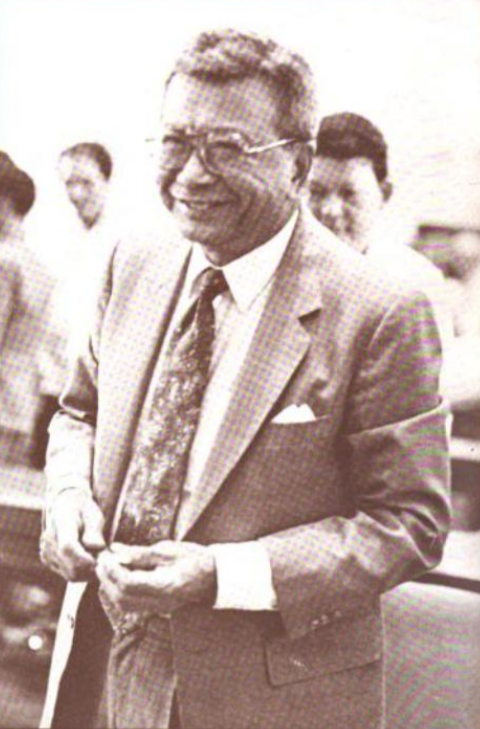
Sotero Laurel

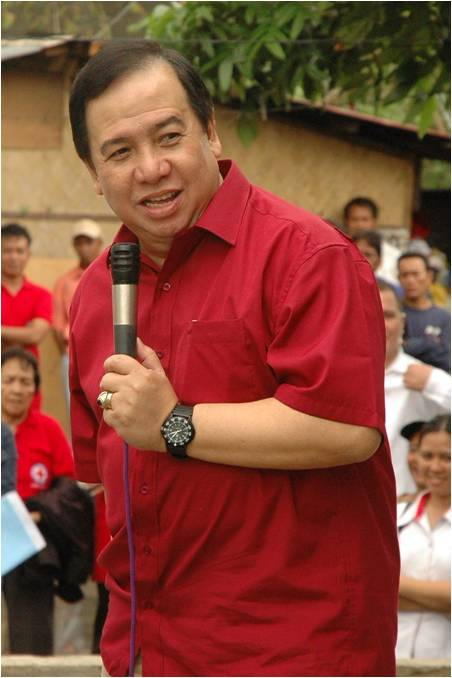
Richard Gordon

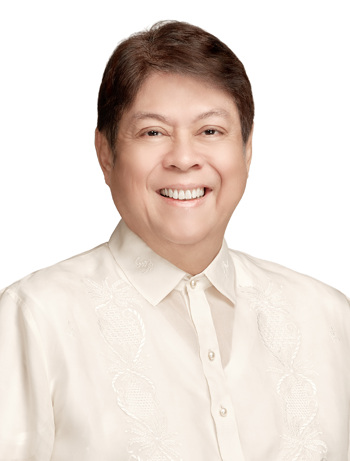
Kiko Pangilinan
- Domocao Alonto (1933) – Senate of the Philippines and Constitutional convention delegate
- Joker Arroyo (1948) – Senate of the Philippines and House of Representatives of the Philippines
- Ninoy Aquino (1950) –Senate of the Philippines; Governor of Tarlac; founder of Lakas ng Bayan
- Dick Gordon (1968) – Senate of the Philippines; 1971 Constitutional convention delegate
- Sotero Laurel (1938) – Senate of the Philippines
- Juan Liwag (1927) – Senate of the Philippines, Secretary of Justice, and Solicitor General of the Philippines
- Kiko Pangilinan (1981) – Senate of the Philippines
- Gil Puyat – 13th President of the Senate of the Philippines, Senate of the Philippines
- Gerry Roxas (1946) – Senate of the Philippines and House of Representatives of the Philippines
- Mamintal A. J. Tamano (1948) – Senate of the Philippines and Vice Governor of Lanao del Sur
- Arturo Tolentino (1931) – President of the Senate of the Philippines, Senate of the Philippines

=== House of Representatives ===
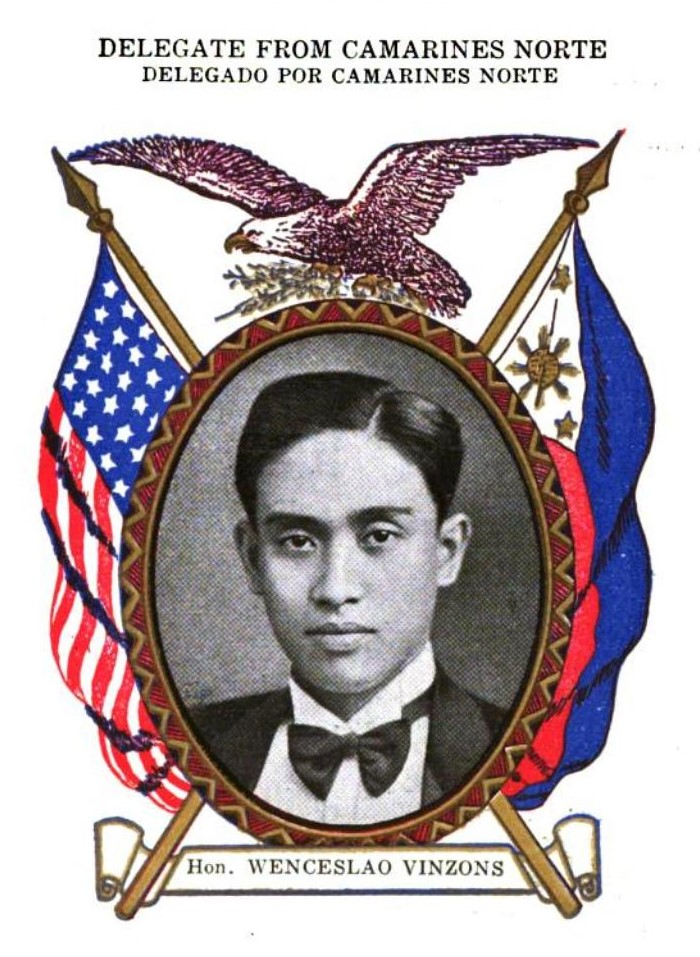
Wenceslao Vinzons

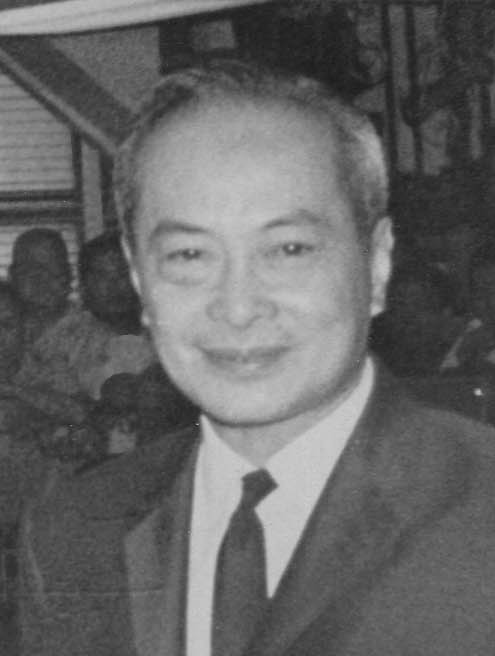
Jose Laurel Jr.

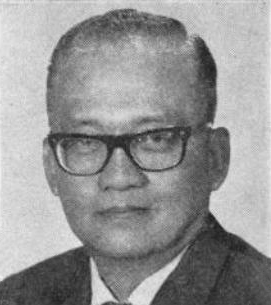
Nicanor Yñiguez
- Roque Ablan Jr. (1950) – House of Representatives of the Philippines for Ilocos Norte
- Isagani Amatong (1960) – House of Representatives of the Philippines for Zamboanga del Norte; Governor of Zamboanga del Norte
- Enrique Belo – Member of the Batasang Pambansa from Capiz; 1971 Constitutional Convention delegate
- Juan Pablo Bondoc (1987) – House of Representatives of the Philippines for Pampanga
- Arnulf Bryan Fuentebella (1994) – House of Representatives of the Philippines for Camarines Sur
- Felix William Fuentebella (1993) – House of Representatives of the Philippines for Camarines Sur
- Jose Laurel Jr. (1932) – Speaker of the House of Representatives of the Philippines; House of Representatives of the Philippines for Batangas; commissioner of the Philippine Constitutional Commission of 1986
- Mel Mathay (1950) – House of Representatives of the Philippines, Mayor of Quezon City
- Jacinto Paras (1971) – House of Representatives of the Philippines for Negros Oriental
- Gilbert Remulla (1989) – House of Representatives of the Philippines for Cavite
- Martin Romualdez (1985) – Speaker of the House of Representatives of the Philippines; House of Representatives of the Philippines for Leyte; owner of the Manila Standard and the People's Journal
- Roman Romulo (1986) – House of Representatives of the Philippines for Pasig
- Gerardo Roxas Jr. (1983) – House of Representatives of the Philippines for Capiz
- Jesus Crispin Remulla – Ombudsman, Secretary of Justice, House of Representatives of the Philippines
- Victorino Dennis Socrates (1982) – House of Representatives of the Philippines, Governor of Palawan
- Simeon Valdez – House of Representatives of the Philippines for Ilocos Norte
- Alfred Vargas – House of Representatives of the Philippines for Quezon City 5th District
- Wenceslao Vinzons (1930) – House of Representatives of the Philippines for Camarines Norte; 1934 Constitutional convention delegate
- Victor Yap (1984) – House of Representatives of the Philippines for Tarlac
- Nicanor Yñiguez (1937) – Speaker of the House of Representatives of the Philippines; House of Representatives of the Philippines for Southern Leyte

=== Governors ===
- Wencelito Andanar (1969) – Governor of Surigao del Norte
- Juanito Remulla (1951) – Governor of Cavite, 1971 Constitutional convention delegate

=== Local government ===
- Vincent Soriano – Mayor of Pakil, Laguna; Laguna Provincial Board

=== Other ===
- Conrado Benitez (1921, honorary) – founder of the Philippine Rural Reconstruction Movement and a drafter of the 1935 Constitution of the Philippines
- Mateo Caparas – Chairman of the Presidential Commission on Good Government; 1971 Constitutional convention delegate
- Ivan Henares (1998) – Secretary-General of the UNESCO National Commission of the Philippines and Commissioner of the National Commission for Culture and the Arts
- Christian Monsod (1953) – Commission on Elections and member of the Constitutional Commission of 1986

== Science ==
- Jose Juliano – president and CEO of the Calamba Medical Center; National Academy of Science and Technology, Nuclear Chemistry and Physics
- Roman Kintanar – Director of the Weather Bureau, later named the Philippine Atmospheric, Geophysical and Astronomical Services Administration; President, World Meteorological Organization (WMO)

== Sports ==
- Timmy Chua (2002) – competative swimmer
- Rene Cruz (1949) – President of the Philippine Olympic Committee
- Chito Salud (1984) – President, CEO, and commissioner of the Philippine Basketball Association
