= List of University of the Philippines College of Law alumni =

This is a list of alumni notable in their own right of the University of the Philippines College of Law (U.P. College of Law), having obtained their LL.B. or Juris Doctor degree from the College, and their organizations while in the College. For a list of notable University of the Philippines graduates, see University of the Philippines people.

== Government of the Philippines ==
=== Executive branch ===
==== Presidents ====
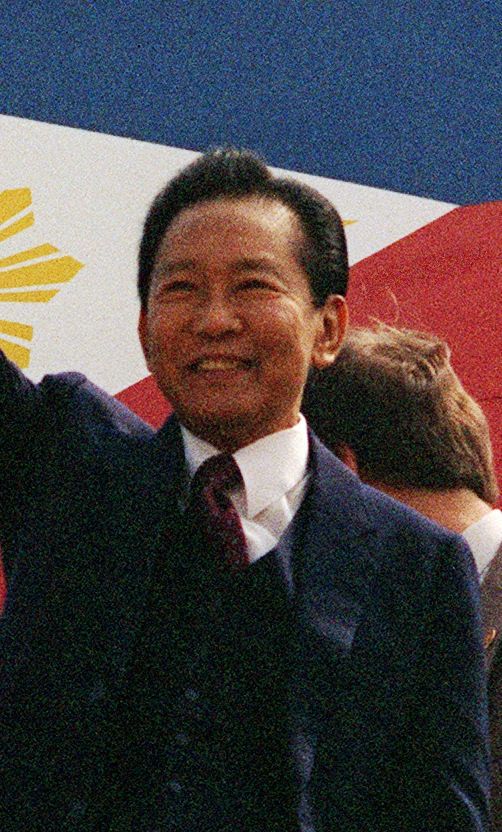
President Ferdinand Marcos, Class of 1939. Upsilon Sigma Phi.

- Elpidio Quirino - Pan Xenia Fraternity
- Manuel Roxas - UP Vanguard Fraternity
- José P. Laurel - Upsilon Sigma Phi
- Ferdinand Marcos - Upsilon Sigma Phi

==== Vice Presidents ====
- Jejomar Binay - Alpha Phi Omega
- Salvador Laurel - Upsilon Sigma Phi

==== Cabinet officials ====
Department of Public Works and Highways Secretary Simeon A. Datumanong (2001-2003, appointed as DoJ Secretary in 2003) Justice Secretary Simeon A. Datumanong (2003 - 2004 resigned to sun for Congress)

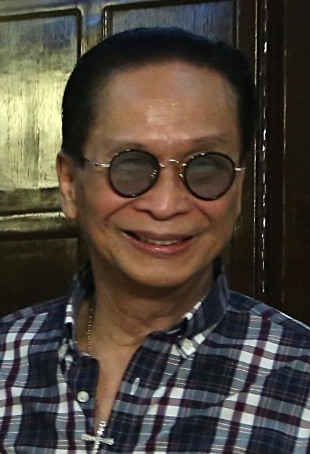
Chief Presidential Legal Counsel and Spokesperson Salvador Panelo '74 - (Duterte). Sigma Rho

- Joker Arroyo, '52, Executive Secretary (Aquino) - Upsilon Sigma Phi
- Catalino Macaraig, Jr., '52, Executive Secretary (Aquino) - Upsilon Sigma Phi
- Salvador Panelo '74, Chief Presidential Legal Counsel and Spokesperson (Duterte) - Sigma Rho
- Simeon Datumanong, '59, Secretary of Justice (Arroyo) - Sigma Rho
- Oscar Orbos, '76, Executive Secretary and DOTC Secretary (Aquino) - Alpha Phi Beta
- Sabino B. Padilla Sr., '15, Secretary of Justice (1948–1949)
- José E. Romero, '22, Secretary of Education (1959–1962; Garcia, Macapagal)
- Gilbert Teodoro, '89, Secretary of National Defense (Arroyo and Marcos Jr.) Also elected as Representative of Tarlac, 1998-2007
- Perfecto Yasay, '72, Secretary of Foreign Affairs (2016–17; Duterte) Also served as Chair of Securities and Exchange Commission, 1995-2000)
- Jesus Crispin Remulla, '87; 60th Secretary of Justice;Former Member of the Philippines House of Representatives from Cavite; Former Governor of Cavite- Upsilon Sigma Phi

==== Solicitors-General ====
- Francisco Chavez, '71, (1986-1992) - Sigma Rho
- Estelito Mendoza - Upsilon Sigma Phi
- Querube Makalintal - Upsilon Sigma Phi
- Juan Liwag - Upsilon Sigma Phi
- Ricardo P. Galvez - Upsilon Sigma Phi
- Romeo C. de la Cruz, '57, (1998)
- Florin Hilbay, '99 (2014–2016)
- Darlene Berberabe, '99 (2025–present)

==== Diplomats ====
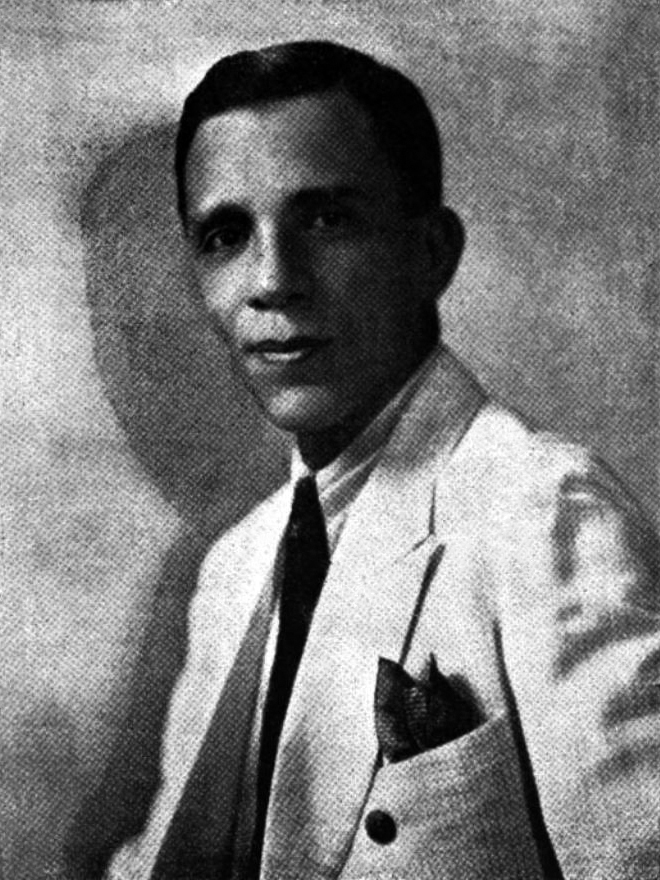
Ambassador to the United Kingdom, José E. Romero, Class of 1922.

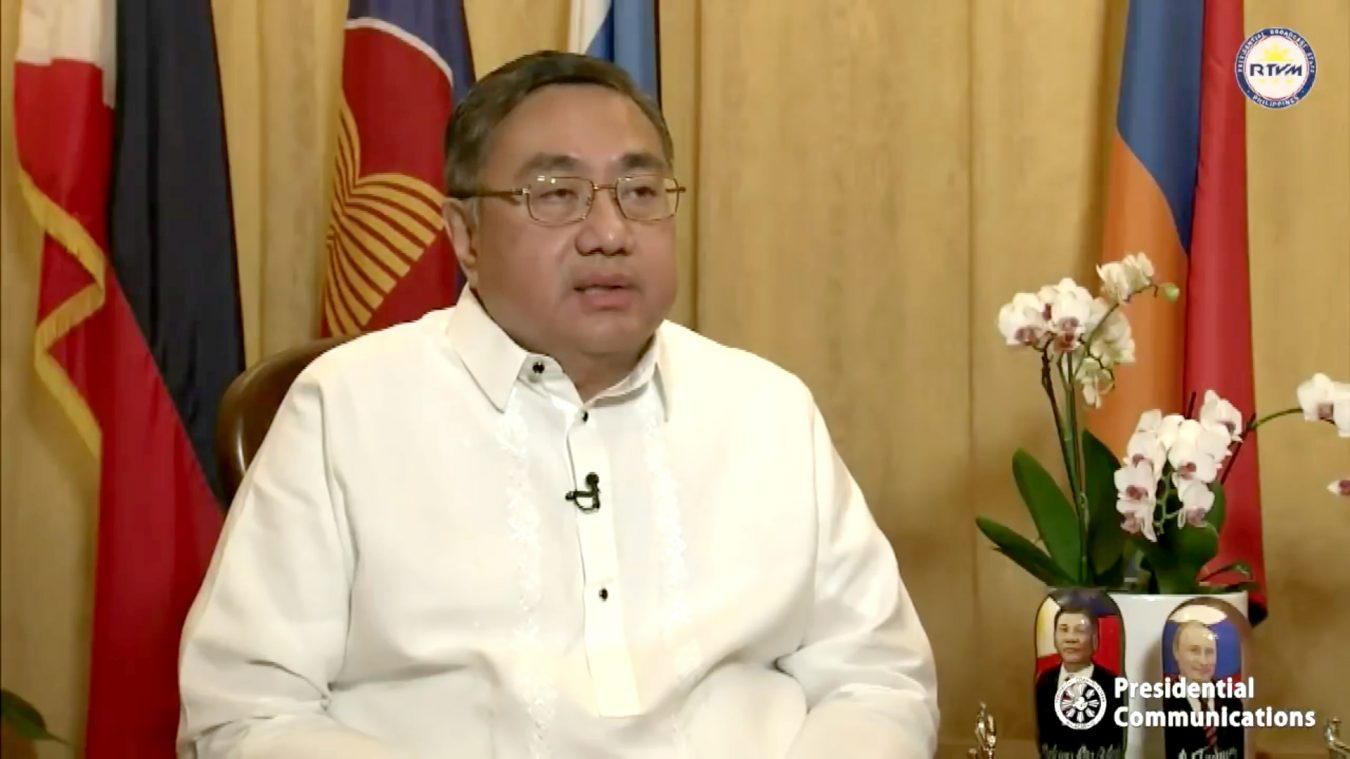
Ambassador to Russia, Carlos Sorreta, Class of 1991. Upsilon Sigma Phi.

- Lauro L. Baja, Jr., '60, Ambassador to the United Nations (2003-2007) - Alpha Phi Beta
- Rosario Gonzalez Manalo, '58, first woman to pass the Foreign Service Officers (FSO) Examination in 1959 - Delta Lambda Sigma
- Rafael M. Salas, '53, first head of United Nations Population Fund - Sigma Rho, Pan Xenia
- Roberto S. Benedicto, Ambassador to Japan (1972-1978); First Class, Order of the Rising Sun (1977) - Upsilon Sigma Phi
- Jaime Victor B. Ledda '89 - Ambassador to The Hague, Netherlands; current Organisation for the Prohibition of Chemical Weapons (OPCW) Asian Group Coordinator - Upsilon Sigma Phi
- Carlos Sorreta, ' 91, current Ambassador to Russia and former Director-General of the Foreign Service Institute - Upsilon Sigma Phi
- José E. Romero, '22, first Philippine Ambassador to the United Kingdom (1949–1953)

==== Other Executive Branch officials ====
- Darlene Berberabe, '99, Solicitor General, CEO, Home Development Mutual Fund (2010-2017), Dean of the UP College of lAW
- Mateo A. T. Caparas, '63; Chairperson, Presidential Commission on Good Government (1988-1990)
- Arnel Casanova, '99, President, Bases Conversion and Development Authority (2011-2016)
- Jorge B. Vargas, '14, Presiding Officer of the Philippine Executive Commission during Japanese Occupation
- Haydee Yorac, '63; Chairperson, Presidential Commission on Good Government (2001-2005) - Portia Sorority, Alpha Phi Omega
- Terry Ridon, ‘11, Chairperson and Chief Executive Officer, Presidential Commission for the Urban Poor (2016-2017)
- Medardo G. De Lemos, '83, National Bureau of Investigation (NBI) Director, 2022–present
- Mehol Sadain, '86, Chairperson, National Commission on Muslim Filipinos (2012-2014) - Scintilla Juris
- Maria Gracia Pulido Tan, 1981, Chair of the Philippine Commission on Audit, Undersecretary of the Revenue Operations Group in the Department of Finance, Presidential Commission on Good Government

=== Judicial branch ===
==== Chief Justices of the Supreme Court ====
- Ramon Aquino, '39, (1985-1986)
- Felix Makasiar, '39, (1985)
- Ricardo Paras, '13, (1951-1961)
- Reynato Puno, '62, (2006–2010) - Alpha Phi Beta/International Order of DeMolay
- Hilario Davide, Jr., '59, (1998 -2005) - Brotherhood of the Filipinos
- Maria Lourdes Sereno, '84, (2012–2018) - Portia Sorority
- César Bengzon, '19, (1961-1966) - Rizal Center
- Teresita Leonardo-De Castro, '72, (2018) - Sigma Alpha, Portia Sorority
- Marcelo Fernan, '52, (1988-1991) - Sigma Rho
- Pedro Yap, '46, (1988) - Sigma Rho
- Fred Ruiz Castro, '36, (1975-1979) - UP Vanguard Fraternity
- José Yulo, '14, (1942-1944) UP Vanguard Fraternity
- Enrique Fernando, '38, (1979-1985) - Upsilon Sigma Phi
- Querube Makalintal, '33, (1973-1975) - Upsilon Sigma Phi

==== Associate Justices of the Supreme Court ====
- Estanislao Fernandez, '33, (1973-1975) - Upsilon Sigma Phi
- Nestor Alampay '41 – Upsilon Sigma Phi
- Ramon Fernandez '40 – Upsilon Sigma Phi
- Vicente Ericta '39 – Upsilon Sigma Phi
- Hermogenes Concepcion '38 – Upsilon Sigma Phi
- Emilio Gancayco '49 – Upsilon Sigma Phi
- Jose Campos '50 – Upsilon Sigma Phi
- Camilo Quiason '51 – Upsilon Sigma Phi
- Florentino Feliciano '53 – Upsilon Sigma Phi
- Josue Bellosillo '58 – Upsilon Sigma Phi
- Alicia Austria-Martinez, '62, (2002-2009) - Alpha Phi Omega
- Vicente Abad Santos, '40, (1979-1986)
- Jesus Barrera, '21, (1959-1966)
- Abdulwahid Bidin, '53, (1987-1997) - Alpha Phi Beta
- Rosmari Carandang, '75, (2018–present) - Tau Gamma Sigma
- Antonio Carpio, '75, (2001–present) - Sigma Rho
- Conchita Carpio Morales, '68, (2004 - 2011) - Portia Sorority; Phi Delta Alpha
- Minita Chico-Nazario, '62, (2004-2010)
- Irene Cortes, '48, (1987-1990)
- Cancio Garcia, '61, (2004-2007)
- Carolina Griño-Aquino, '50, (1988-1993) - Delta Lambda Sigma
- Hugo Gutierrez, Jr., '52, (1982-1993) - Alpha Phi Beta
- Marvic Leonen, '87, (2012–present)
- Ameurfina Melencio-Herrera, '47, (1979-1992) - Portia Sorority; Sigma Delta Phi
- Vicente Mendoza, '57, (1994-2003) - Beta Sigma
- Cecilia Muñoz-Palma, '37, (1973-1978) - Portia Sorority
- Sabino Padilla Sr., '15 (1946-1964)
- Teodoro Padilla, '51 (1987-1997) - Beta Sigma
- Leonardo Quisumbing, '64, (1998-2009) - Alpha Phi Beta
- Alexander Reyes, '14, (1948-1959)
- J.B.L. Reyes, '22, (1954-1972)
- Flerida Ruth Romero, '52, (1991-1999)
- Abraham Sarmiento, '49, (1987-1991) - Alpha Phi Beta
- Conrado Vasquez, '37, (1982-1983)
- Presbitero Velasco, Jr., '71, (2006–present) - Sigma Rho
- James Vickers, '13, (1932-1936)
- Consuelo Ynares-Santiago, '62, (1999-2010) - Alpha Phi Omega
- Calixto Zaldivar, '28, (1964-1974)
- Jhosep Lopez, '88, (2021–present) – Sigma Rho
- Raul Villanueva, '85, (2025–present) – Alpha Phi Beta

=== Legislative branch ===
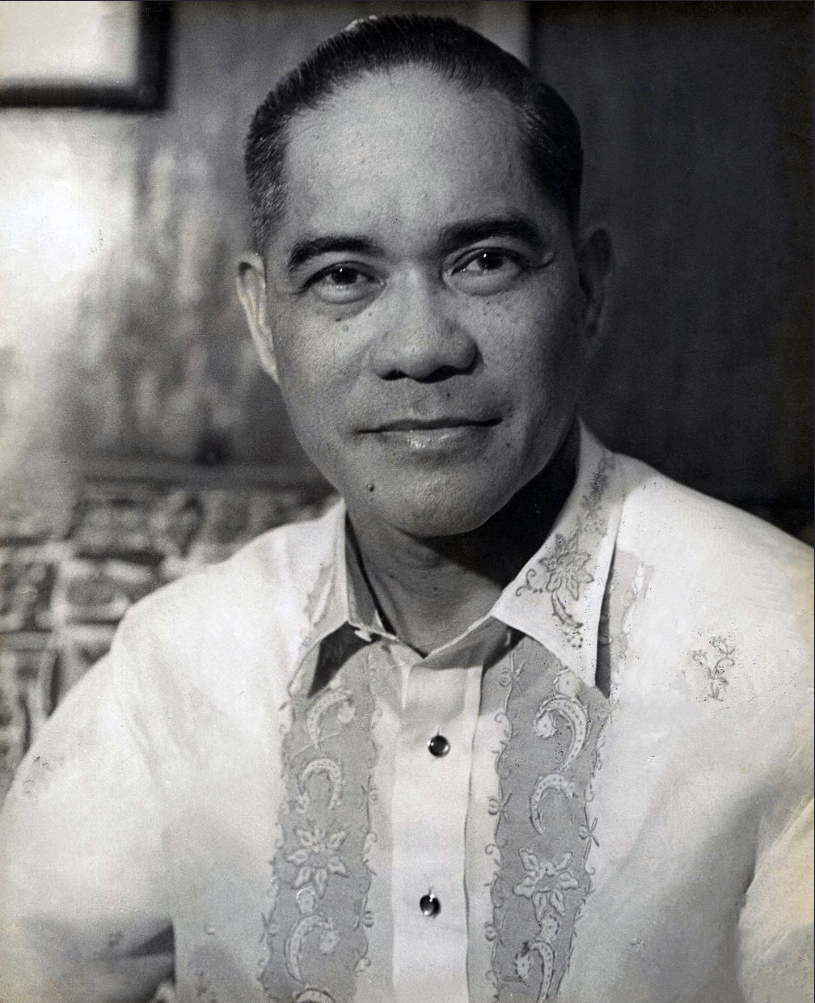
Senator Arturo Tolentino, Class of 1934. Senator Tolentino is also known as the father of the Philippine "archipelagic doctrine." Upsilon Sigma Phi.

==== Senate Presidents ====
- Francis G. Escudero '93 - Alpha Phi Beta
- Aquilino Pimentel III '89
- Jovito Salonga '46 - Sigma Rho (resigned)
- Marcelo Fernan '52 - Sigma Rho
- Edgardo Angara '58 - Sigma Rho
- Juan Ponce Enrile '53 - Sigma Rho, UP Vanguard Fraternity
- Franklin Drilon '69 - Sigma Rho
- Sotero Laurel '40 - Upsilon Sigma Phi
- Arturo Tolentino '34 - Upsilon Sigma Phi
- Ferdinand E. Marcos '39 - Upsilon Sigma Phi

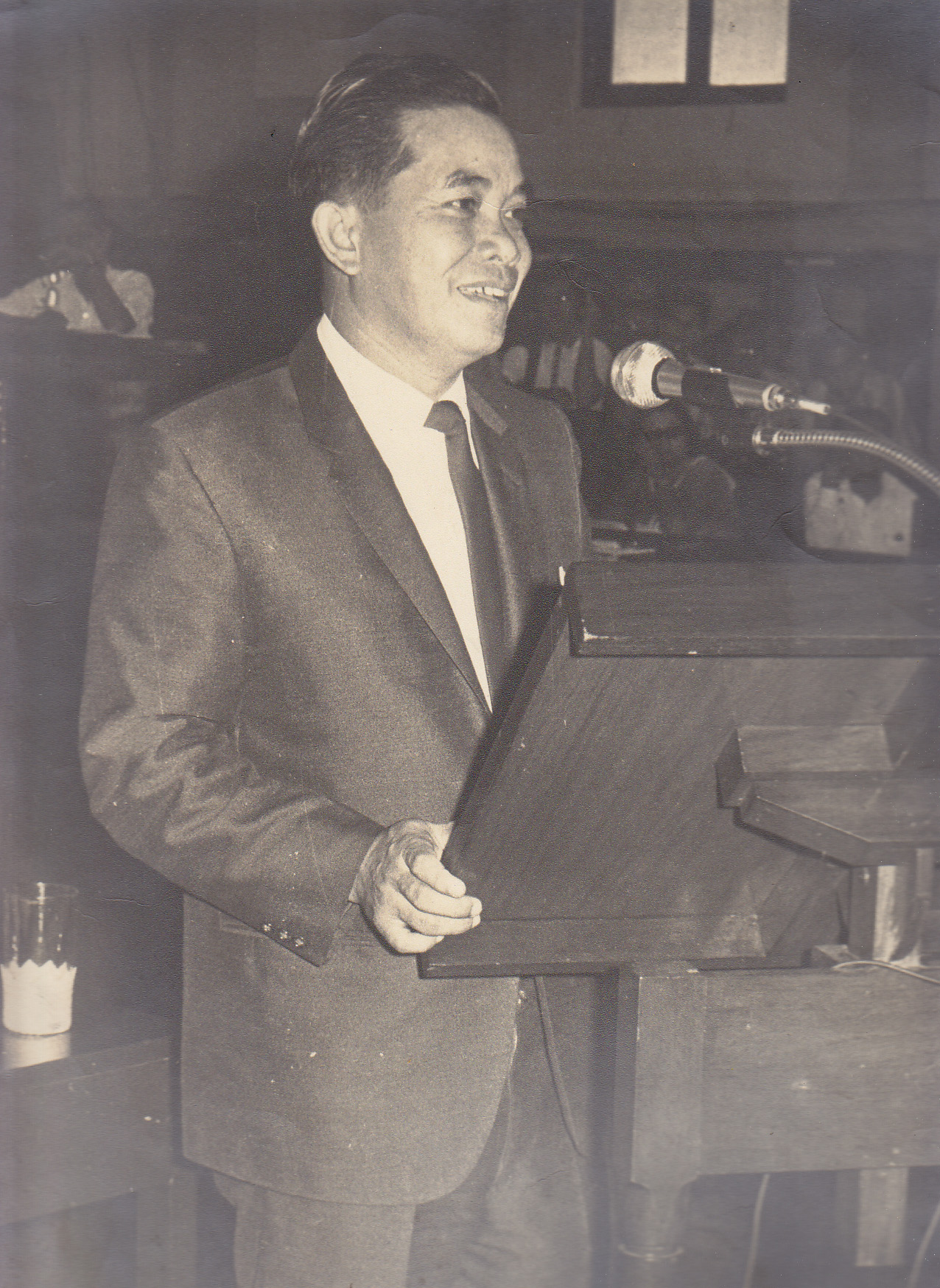
Senator Jovito Salonga, Class of 1946. Resigned from Sigma Rho.

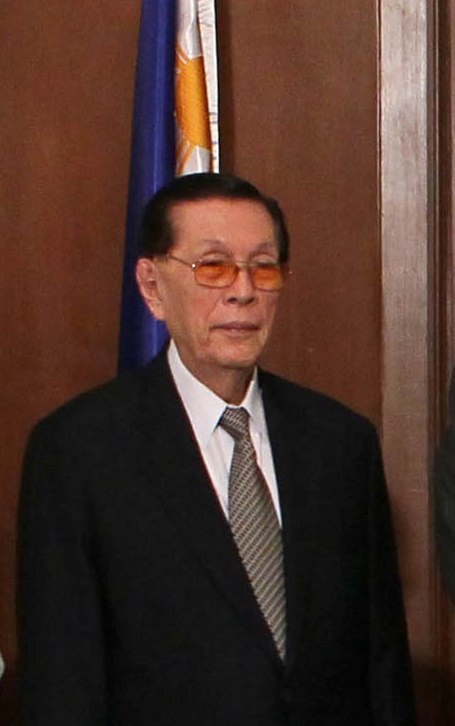
Senator Juan Ponce Enrile, Class of 1953. Sigma Rho.

==== Senators ====
- Francis Pangilinan, (2001–present) - Upsilon Sigma Phi
- Richard J. Gordon (2004–present) - Upsilon Sigma Phi
- Joker Arroyo (2001–present) - Upsilon Sigma Phi
- Mamintal A.J. Tamano (1987-1992) - Upsilon Sigma Phi
- Estanislao Fernandez, (1962-1965)- Upsilon Sigma Phi
- Sotero Laurel (1987-1992) - Upsilon Sigma Phi
- Juan R. Liwag (1963-1969) - Upsilon Sigma Phi
- Gerardo Roxas (1963-1972) - Upsilon Sigma Phi
- Domocao Alonto (1965-1961) - Upsilon Sigma Phi
- Ambrosio Padilla, (1957-1973) - Alpha Phi Beta
- Pia Cayetano, (2004–present) - Delta Lambda Sigma
- Sonny Angara, (2013–present) - Sigma Rho
- Miriam Defensor Santiago, (1995-2001, 2004–2016) - UP Lady Vanguard
- Salipada Pendatun, (1946-1951, 1969-1972) - UP Vanguard Fraternity
- Justiniano Montano, (1949-1955)
- Rene Cayetano (1998-2003)
- Francisco Rodrigo, (1955-1972)
- José E. Romero, (1946)
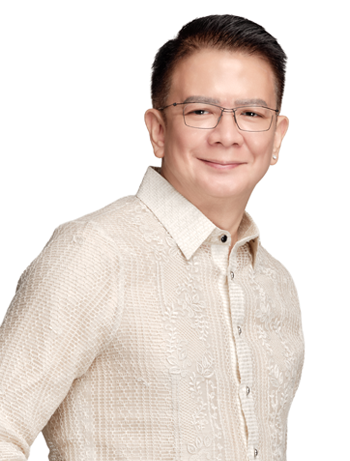
  Senator Francis "Chiz" Escudero. Alpha Phi Beta
- Jose Roy, (1962-1972)
- Lorenzo Sumulong, (1949-1972)
- Lorenzo Tañada, (1947-1972)

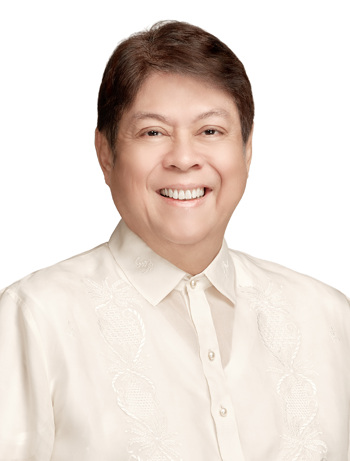
Senator Francis Pangilinan, Class of 1993. Upsilon Sigma Phi.

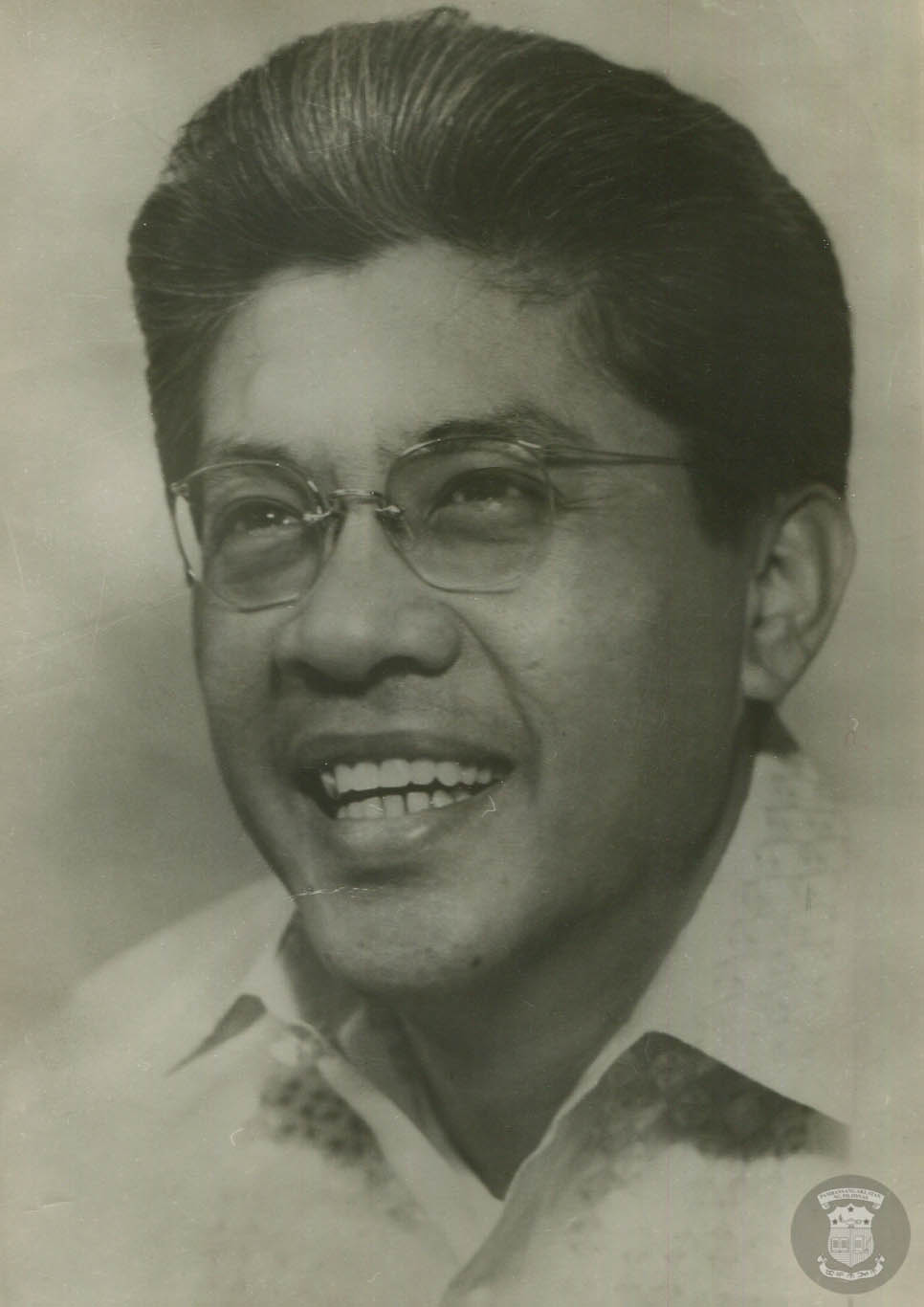
Senator Gerardo Roxas, Class of 1949. Upsilon Sigma Phi.

==== Speakers of the House of Representatives ====
- Querube Makalintal - Upsilon Sigma Phi
- José B. Laurel, Jr. - Upsilon Sigma Phi
- Nicanor Yñiguez - Upsilon Sigma Phi
- Eugenio Pérez
- Daniel Romualdez - Alpha Phi Omega
- Arnulfo Fuentebella
- Ferdinand Martin Romualdez, Class of 1994. Upsilon Sigma Phi

==== Representatives ====
Class 1959 House Deputy Speaker Simeon A. Datumanong Maguindanao Second District (1992-2001; 2004-2019)

- Roman Romulo, '94; Lone District, Pasig (2007–present) - Upsilon Sigma Phi
- Wenceslao Vinzons, '33; Lone District, Camarines Norte (1941-1942) - Upsilon Sigma Phi
- Cyrille Abueg-Zaldivar, '03; Legislative districts of Palawan (1995-2004)
- Bellaflor J. Angara-Castillo, '62; Lone District, Aurora (1995-2004)
- Juan Edgardo "Sonny" M Angara, 00; Lone District, Aurora (2004–2013) - Sigma Rho
- Kit Belmonte, '02; 6th District, Quezon City (2013–present)
- Neri Colmenares, '96; Bayan Muna (2010-2016)
- Arthur Defensor, '63; 3rd District, Iloilo (2001–present) Sigma Rho
- Matias Defensor Jr., '71; 3rd District, Quezon City (2004-2010) - Beta Sigma
- Pio Duran, '23; 3rd District, Albay (1949-1961)
- Constantino Jaraula, '60; Lone District, Cagayan de Oro City (1998-2007)
- Edcel Lagman, '66; 1st District, Albay (1987-1998, 2004–present) - Alpha Phi Beta
- Romulo Lumauig, '57; First elected Congressman, Ifugao (1969-1972) - Beta Sigma
- Romero Quimbo, '96; 2nd District, Marikina (2010–present) - Alpha Sigma
- Terry Ridon, '11; Kabataan Party List (2013-2016), Bicol Saro Party List (2025–present)
- Rufus Rodriguez, '80; 2nd District, Cagayan de Oro City (2007–present)
- José E. Romero, '22; 2nd District, Negros Oriental (1931–1941, 1945-1946)
- Ron Salo, '03; KABAYAN Party List (2016–present)
- Victor Sumulong, '73; 2nd District, Antipolo City (1998-2007) - Sigma Rho
- Luis Villafuerte, '59; 2nd District, Camarines Sur (2004–present) - Sigma Rho
- Liwayway Vinzons-Chato, '68; Lone District, Camarines Norte (2007–present)
- Ronaldo Zamora, '69; Lone District, San Juan City (1987-1998, 2004–present)
- Maria Salud Vivero - Parreno, '42; 2nd District, Leyte (1965 - 1969)
- Rodel Batocabe, '91; Ako Bicol Party List (2010–2018)

=== Heads of Constitutional Offices ===
- Christian Monsod, '60, COMELEC Chairperson (1991-1995) - Upsilon Sigma Phi
- Bartolome C. Fernandez, Jr.; Commissioner, Commission on Audit - Upsilon Sigma Phi
- Vicente Ericta - Ombudsman - Upsilon Sigma Phi
- Romeo Brawner, '59, COMELEC Acting Chairperson (2008)
- Simeon Marcelo, '79, Ombudsman (2002-2005) - Sigma Rho
- Conchita Carpio Morales, '68, Ombudsman (2011–present) - Portia Sorority
- Purificacion Quisumbing, '64, Chairperson, Commission on Human Rights
- Lucineto Tagle, '68, COMELEC Commissioner(2008-2015); Former Associate Justice, Court of Appeals - Beta Sigma
- Ma. Rowena Amelia V. Guanzon, '84, COMELEC Commissioner (2015–present) - Delta Lambda Sigma
- Mehol Sadain, '86, COMELEC Commissioner (2000-2006) - Scintilla Juris

=== Notable local government executives ===
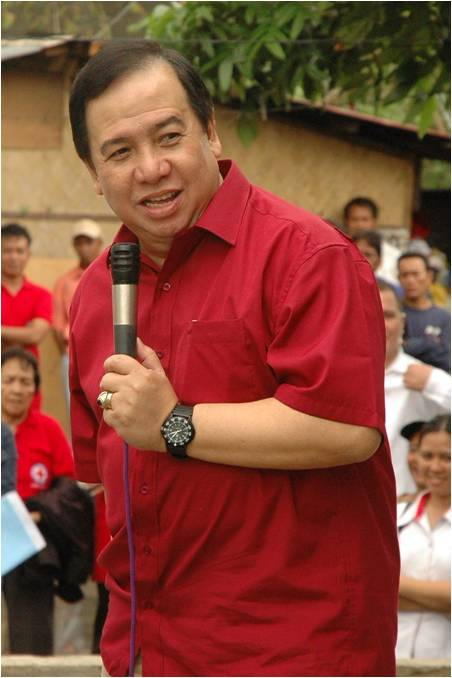
Senator Richard J. Gordon, Class of 1975. Upsilon Sigma Phi.

- Richard J. Gordon, '75; chairman of the Subic Bay Metropolitan Authority; Senator; Chairman, Philippine Red Cross - Upsilon Sigma Phi
- Jejomar Binay, '67; Makati mayor (1986-1998, 2001-2010) -Alpha Phi Omega/International Order of DeMolay
- Cesar Climaco, '41; Zamboanga City mayor
- Carmen Planas, '40, first woman elected to a city council (Manila) - Sigma Delta Phi
- Isidro Rodriguez, '38, former Rizal governor
- Jesus Crispin Remulla, '88 former Cavite governor and incumbent Congressman - Upsilon Sigma Phi

== International Organizations ==
- Jolly Bugarin, only Filipino elected as President, International Criminal Police Organization (Interpol) - Upsilon Sigma Phi
- Mateo A. T. Caparas, only Filipino elected as President of Rotary International - Upsilon Sigma Phi
- Florentino P. Feliciano, Chairman of the Appellate Body of the World Trade Organization - Upsilon Sigma Phi
- Raul Pangalangan, judge of the International Criminal Court - Alpha Sigma

== Academe ==
- Edgardo Carlo Lasam Vistan II - former Dean, UP College of Law - Upsilon Sigma Phi
- Danilo Concepcion '84 – current President, University of the Philippines; Dean, UP College of Law; Commissioner, Securities and Exchange Commission; President, Gregorio Araneta University Foundation - Upsilon Sigma Phi
- Joseph Emmanuelle Angeles '03 – President, Angeles University Foundation - Upsilon Sigma Phi
- Carmelino Alvendia, Sr., '30; founder of Quezon City Academy, co-founder of MLQU - Upsilon Sigma Phi
- Sotero Laurel '40 - President, Lyceum of Batangas; Chairman, Lyceum of the Philippines University - Upsilon Sigma Phi
- Carmelino Alvendia, Sr., '30; founder of Quezon City Academy, co-founder of MLQU - Upsilon Sigma Phi
- Conrado Benitez, '16; co-founder, Philippine Women's University - Upsilon Sigma Phi
- Raul Pangalangan, '83 – International Criminal Court judge, law professor, newspaper columnist and former U.P. Law Dean - Alpha Sigma
- Antonio La Viña, '89; former Dean of Ateneo School of Government, U.P. Law Professor
- Katrina Legarda, '80; family law specialist; former Manila Times publisher; author; former television host
- Raoul Victorino, '57; former dean, College of Law Philippine Christian University, Former Associate Justice, Sandiganbayan - Beta Sigma

== Social activism and advocacy ==
- Antonio Oposa, '82; environmental activist
- Ahmad Domocao Alonto; King Faisal International Prize Awardee for Service to Islam - Upsilon Sigma Phi

== Industry ==
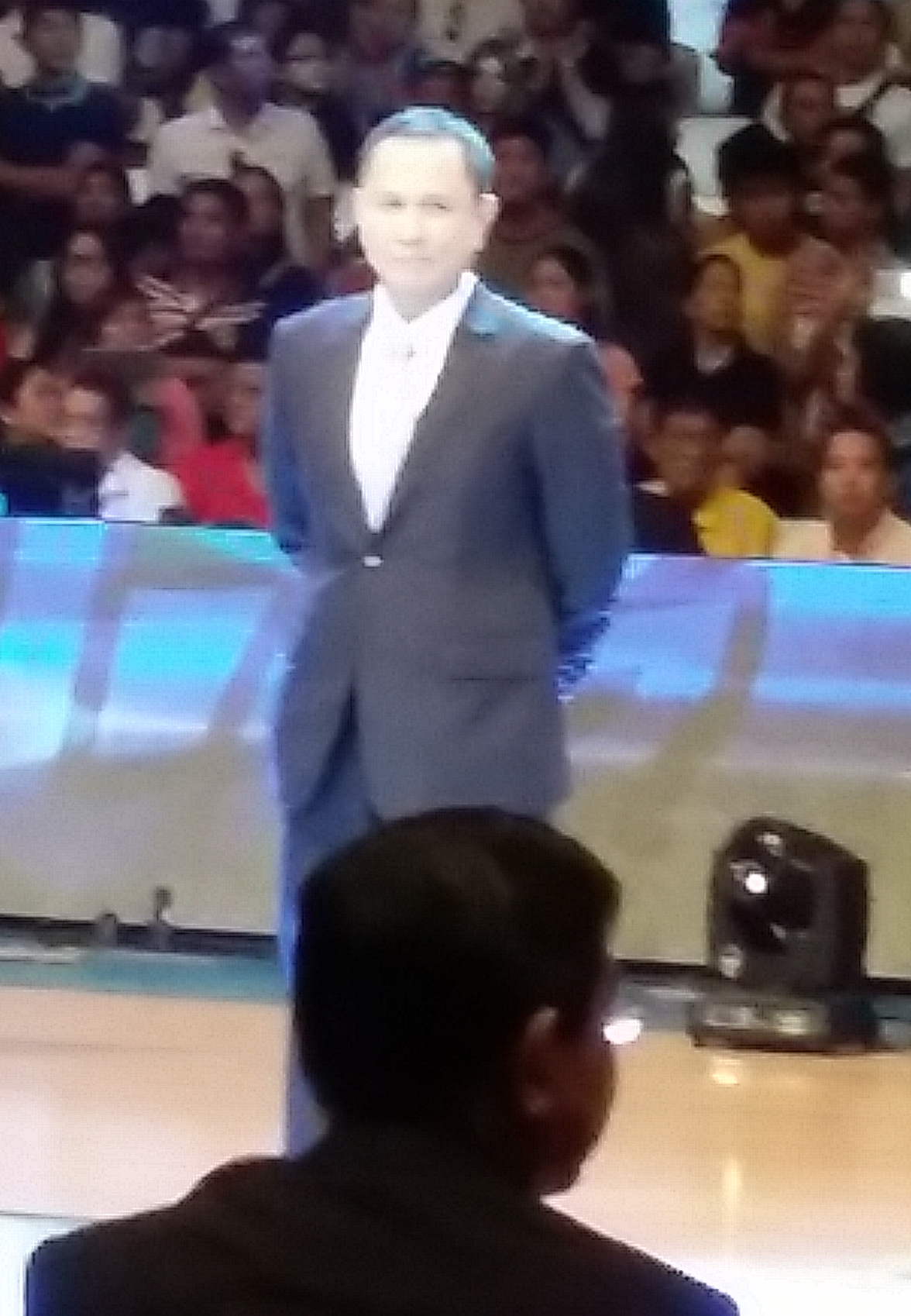
PBA Commissioner Chito Salud, Class of 1985. Upsilon Sigma Phi.

- Chito Salud, '85; Chairman and CEO, Philippine Basketball Association - Upsilon Sigma Phi
- Jake Almeda Lopez, '52; general manager and Vice Chairman, ABS-CBN - Upsilon Sigma Phi
- Antonio Quirino, '32; founder of (ABS) Alto Broadcasting System (precursor to ABS-CBN), first television station in the Philippines - Upsilon Sigma Phi
- Eugenio Lopez, Sr., '23; founder of Chronicle Broadcasting Network and Manila Chronicle
- Felipe Gozon, '62, Chairman and CEO, GMA Network
- Annette Gozon-Valdes, '97, Senior Vice-President, GMA Network
- Loida Nicolas-Lewis, '68; CEO, TLC Beatrice
- Don M. Ferry, '57; former Vice Chairman, Development Bank of the Philippines; former Chairman, Board of Transportation (Now LTFRB) - Beta Sigma

== Arts ==
=== Literature ===
- Stevan Javellana, '48; novelist (Without Seeing the Dawn) - Sigma Rho
- Linda Ty Casper, '55; novelist (The Peninsulares, DreamEden)

== News and entertainment industry ==
=== Television ===
- Jake Almeda Lopez, '52; general manager and Vice Chairman, ABS-CBN - Upsilon Sigma Phi
- Danilo Concepcion '83 - UP President, DZMM announcer; Law Professor, U.P College of Law - Upsilon Sigma Phi
- Zorayda Ruth Andam, '04; Binibining Pilipinas-Universe 2001; television host; commercial endorser
- Anna Theresa Licaros '09 - Binibining Pilipinas-Universe 2007; commercial endorser - Portia Sorority
- Jose Mari Velez '70 - television newscaster with ABC and GMA - Scintilla Juris
- Tippy Dos Santos '22 - singer; actress.

=== Print journalism ===
- Billy Balbastro, '62; entertainment columnist - Sigma Rho
- Daisy Catherine Mandap, '85, Print and Broadcast Journalist and Editor (Manila and HK); UPAA Distinguished Alumna in Public Service, 2014
