= Harvey Cenit =

Dubai-based Filipino fashion designer

Harvey Cenit is a Filipino fashion designer based in the United Arab Emirates. He is known for his work in couture fashion, including designs worn at international beauty pageants, film festivals, and entertainment events. Cenit gained wider recognition after winning Fashion Factor Season 3 in the United Arab Emirates and receiving the Most Promising Fashion Designer of the Year award at The Filipino Times Awards in 2016.

== Early life and education ==
Cenit was born in Medellin, northern Cebu, Philippines. He earned a Bachelor of Fine Arts in Studio Arts from the University of the Philippines Cebu.

== Career ==
=== Career beginnings ===
After graduating, Cenit worked as an in-house designer in Cebu for approximately six years under designers Harley Ruedas and Mark So. In 2013, he relocated to Dubai, where he later became head designer for the couture fashion house Al Arousa Al Aniqah.

=== Fashion Factor and international recognition ===
Cenit won Fashion Factor Season 3, a fashion competition in the United Arab Emirates, where he was the only Filipino contestant. Following his win, he was included in Illustrado magazine’s list of influential Filipinos in the Gulf.

His work subsequently gained broader international exposure through appearances at beauty pageants and major film festivals.

=== Notable works and collaborations ===
Cenit designs have appeared at the Cannes Film Festival on multiple occasions. In 2023, actress Fan Bingbing wore a gown by Cenit during the festival. In subsequent years, his creations were worn at Cannes by model Mitchell Akat Maruko Raan and Miss Universe New Zealand 2024 Franki Russell.

In beauty pageantry, Cenit has designed gowns worn by titleholders and national representatives, including Miss Universe 2018 Catriona Gray and Miss Universe Bahrain 2022 Evlin Khalifa. His work also appeared in international music and entertainment productions, including a design featured in the music video for the song "Jealousy."

Cenit's designs have additionally appeared in fashion editorials, including a high-fashion photoshoot in Dubai.

=== Fashion shows and exhibitions ===
In 2017, he participated in Fashion Homecoming, a Spring/Summer collection showcase held at Ayala Center Cebu, alongside other designers. He later presented collections at the Cebu Wedding Expo 2018, where he was among the featured designers in the “Intemporel” bridal fashion show.

He has also taken part in the Ystilo and Moda Fashion Show series held in Dubai in conjunction with Philippine Independence Day celebrations in 2023 and 2024. In 2025, he showcased his collection A True Modern Bloom at the Fashion Factor 10th Anniversary Show in the United Arab Emirates.

== Awards and recognition ==
- Most Promising Fashion Designer of the Year (2016) – The Filipino Times Awards.
- Grand Champion – Fashion Factor Season 3 (UAE).
- Included in Illustrado Magazine’s list of “300 Most Influential Filipinos in the Gulf.”

== Design approach ==
Fashion publications have described Cenit’s work as combining classical and contemporary elements, with an emphasis on structured silhouettes and feminine detailing. In interviews, Cenit has stated that he aims to mentor emerging designers from Cebu and support Filipino fashion initiatives abroad.
