= University of the Philippines Baguio =

Public university in Baguio, Philippines

- Unibersidad ng Pilipinas Baguio (Filipino)
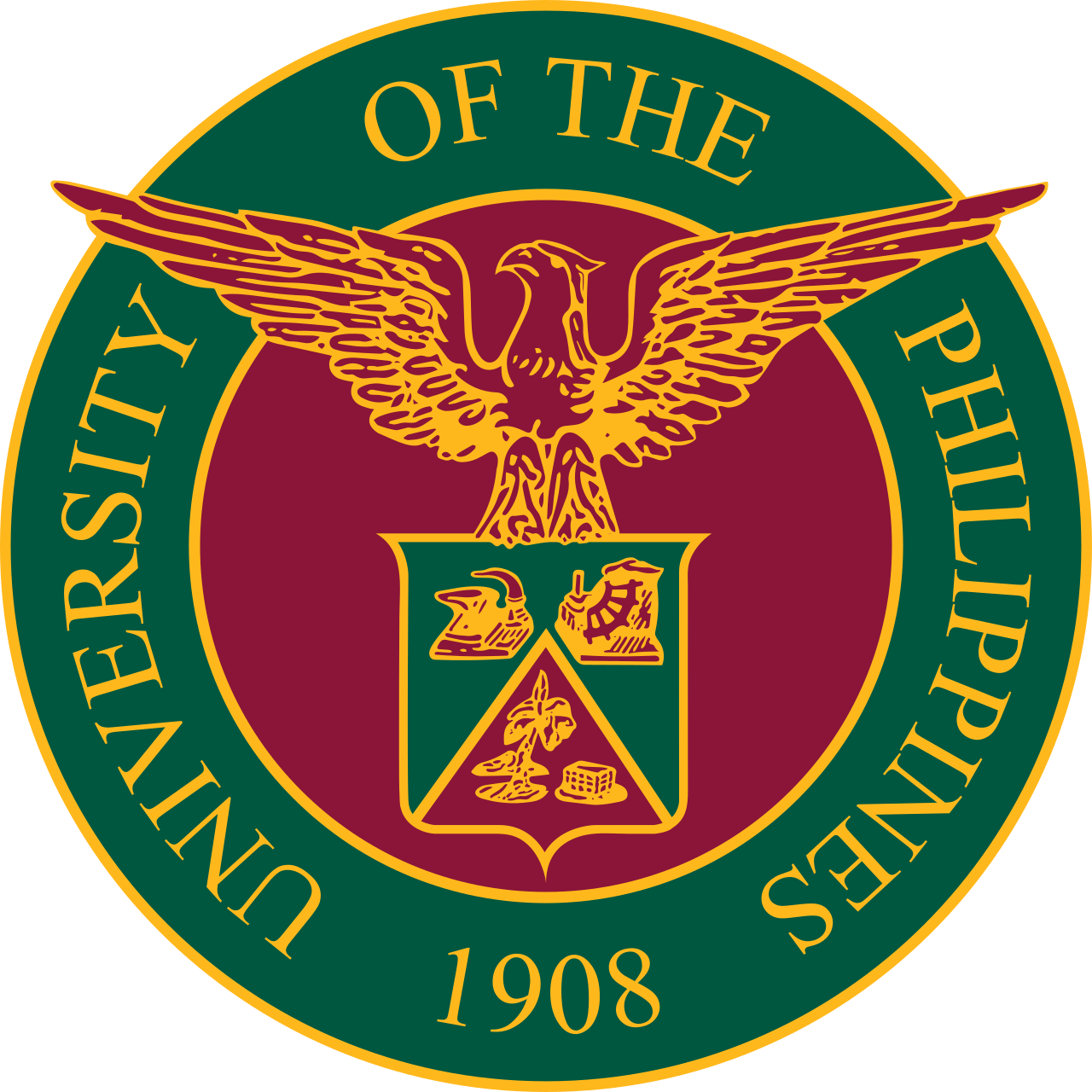
- Motto: Honor, Excellence, Service
- Type: Public state university, research university
- Established: 1921 (as Vigan extension campus of the UP College of Liberal Arts); 1938 (transfer to Baguio); April 22, 1961; 65 years ago (as branch campus of UP Diliman); December 2, 2002; 23 years ago (UP Baguio)
- Academic affiliations: APRU; ASAIHL; ASEA UNINET; AUN
- Chancellor: Joel M. Addawe
- President: Angelo Jimenez
- Academic staff: 143 (2013)
- Students: 2,766 (March 2023)
- Undergraduates: 2,432 (March 2023)
- Postgraduates: 334 (March 2023)
- Location: Baguio, Philippines; 16°24′19″N 120°35′53″E
- Campus: Suburban; 6 ha (15 acres)
- Newspaper: Outcrop
- Colors: UP Maroon and UP Forest Green
- Nickname: Fighting Maroons
- Sporting affiliations: BBEAL
- Website: upb.edu.ph
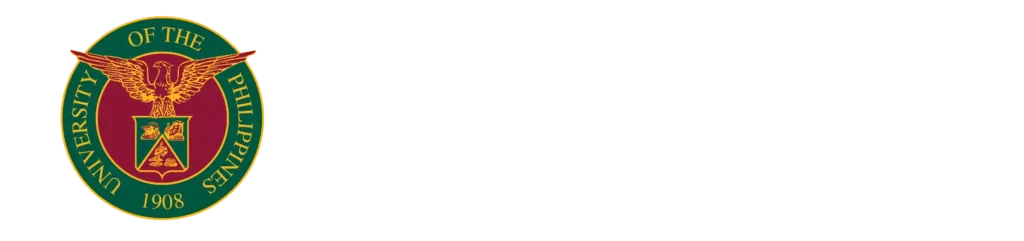

- Location in Luzon Location in the Philippines

The University of the Philippines Baguio (UPB; Filipino: Unibersidad ng Pilipinas Baguio), also referred to as UP in the North or UP Baguio, is a public research university located in Baguio, Philippines. It was established in 1921 through the initiative of UP alumni in Baguio and Benguet and was inaugurated as the University of the Philippines College Baguio on April 22, 1961. It was eventually elevated to its present autonomous status as a constituent university on December 2, 2002.

It is the seventh constituent university of the University of the Philippines System as well as its flag-bearer in Northern Luzon. It is also one of the most active research institutions in the region through the Cordillera Studies Center, the main research arm of the university that regularly conducts interdisciplinary investigations focusing on sociocultural and political issues within the local indigenous communities and the preservation of the local biodiversity within the Cordillera Region.

A former extension of the UP College of Liberal Arts, UP Baguio specializes in the arts, humanities, and the natural sciences. It currently offers 16 academic programs through its three degree-granting units. As of 2019, the Commission on Higher Education (CHED) has accredited three academic programs in the university as Centers of Development, namely in the fields of biology, mathematics, and physics.

== History ==
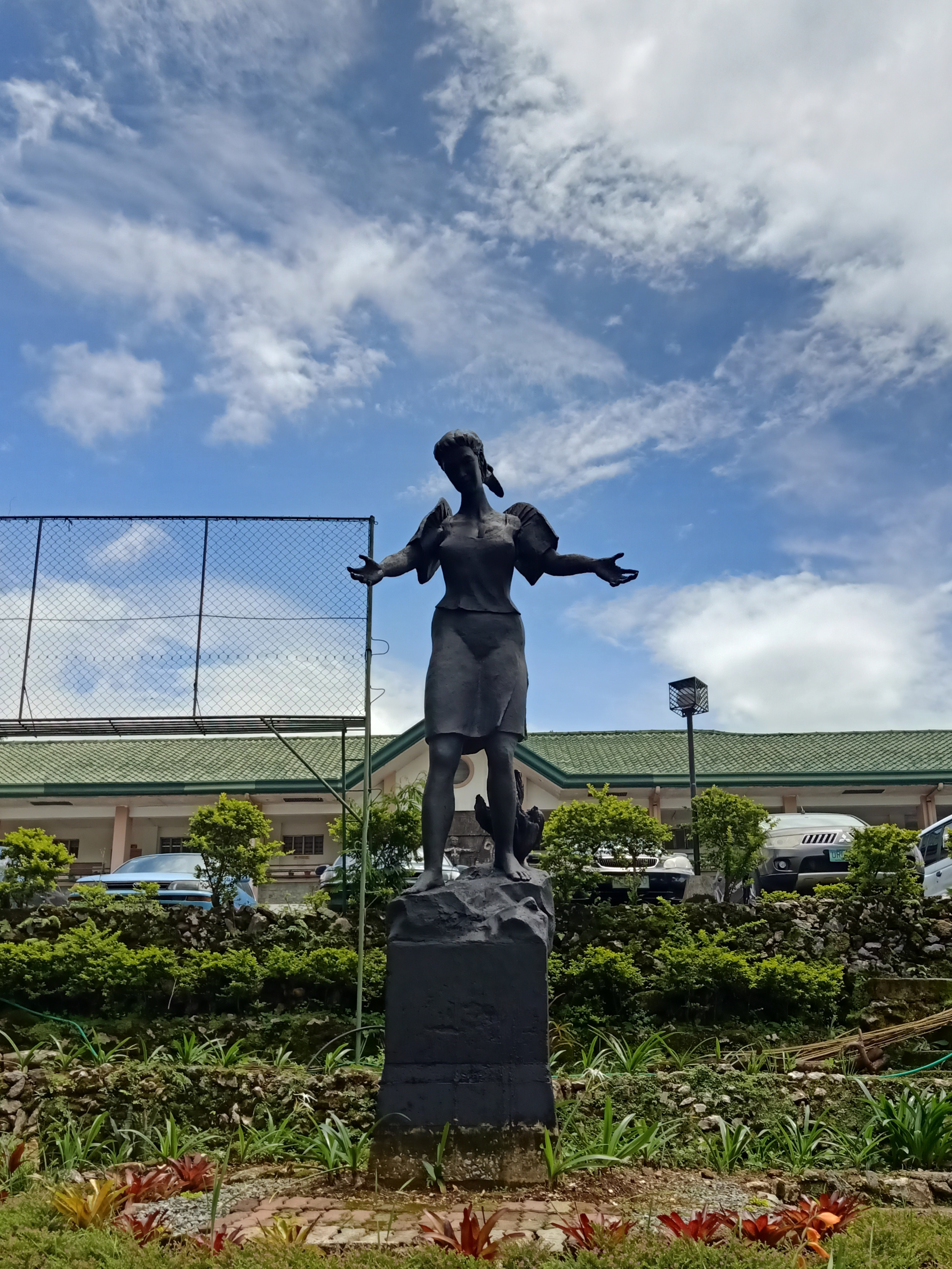
Inang Laya Monument

The university was initially established in 1921 as an extension of the UP College of Liberal Arts, and was originally located in Vigan, Ilocos Sur. In 1938, it was relocated to Baguio as the UP College of Arts and Sciences.

During World War II, the buildings and facilities within the college were largely destroyed, and reestablishment efforts were immediately carried out by UP alumni after the war. After several years since its post-war restoration, the college then became a branch campus of UP Diliman, becoming known as the UP College Baguio (UPCB) on April 22, 1961.

On December 2, 2002, the university's distinction was affirmed by the elevation of the UP College Baguio into a Constituent University (CU) through a unanimous endorsement by the UP Board of Regents (BOR), in which it became officially known as UP Baguio.

== Organization and administration ==
Chancellors of the
University of the Philippines Baguio
Dr. Priscilla Supnet Macansantos, 2003–2012
Dr. Raymundo D. Rovillos, 2012–2021
Dr. Corazon L. Abansi, 2021–2024
Dr. Joel M. Addawe, 2024–present

UP Baguio is governed by the university system's 11-member Board of Regents. Like all other UP campuses, UP Baguio is headed and supervised by a Chancellor, who is assisted by two Vice Chancellors — one for Academic Affairs and the other for Administration. The first Chancellor of UP Baguio is Dr. Priscilla Supnet Macansantos, who oversaw the campus' elevation into a constituent university of UP within her term. The third Chancellor selected by the Board of Regents is Dr. Corazon L. Abansi, who succeeded the second Chancellor, Dr. Raymundo Rovillos, after his term ended on April 13, 2021. The fourth and current Chancellor is Dr. Joel M. Addawe.

The University of the Philippines Baguio is an affiliate of the following associations:

- Association of Pacific Rim Universities
- ASEAN University Network
- Association of Southeast Asian Institutions of Higher Learning

== Academics ==
=== Admissions ===
Admission to the university is highly selective. Students who wish to enter the university must first pass the University of the Philippines College Admission Test (UPCAT), which serves as an admission requirement for all constituent units of the university system.

Academic units of UP Baguio
Unit	Foundation	Notes
College of Arts and Communication	2002	
College of Science	2002	
College of Social Sciences	2002	

=== Degree-granting units ===
UP Baguio constitutes three colleges as its academic arms, which are headed by their respective deans. On the other hand, the Institute of Management―which is part of the College of Social Sciences―is headed by a director, while the Human Kinetics Program―which is part of the College of Science―is led by a coordinator. and offers 11 undergraduate degree programs, 8 graduate degree programs, and a pre-baccalaureate certificate program.

The university has been identified by CHED as a Center of Development in biology, mathematics, and physics since 2001.

UP Baguio is also internationally known for the Cordillera Review Center, which produces ethnic and interdisciplinary articles and journals — arguably making it one of the primary institutions in Northern Luzon and the Cordilleras. The constituent university is also known for the Cordillera Review, a peer-reviewed journal that features researches about the Cordilleras and Northern Luzon.

== See also ==
- State Universities and Colleges (Philippines)
- List of University of the Philippines people
- University of the Philippines
- University of the Philippines Manila
- University of the Philippines Los Baños
- University of the Philippines Diliman
- University of the Philippines Cebu
- University of the Philippines Tacloban
- University of the Philippines Visayas
- University of the Philippines Mindanao
- University of the Philippines Open University
