= Rico Puno =

Rico Puno may refer to:

- Rico E. Puno, Philippine technocrat
- Rico J. Puno (1953–2018), Philippine singer
