= University of the Philippines Cebu =

Public university in Cebu City, Philippines

- Unibersidad sa Pilipinas sa Sugbo (Cebuano)
- Motto: “Honor, Excellence, Service”
- Type: National, research university
- Established: May 3, 1918 (108 years and 185 days)
- Affiliations: APRU, ASAIHL, ASEA UNINET; AUN, UAAP
- Chancellor: Leo B. Malagar
- President: Angelo Jimenez
- Academic staff: 124 (2013)
- Students: 1954+ (2024)
- Undergraduates: 1,695 (2024)
- Postgraduates: 259 (2024)
- Other students: 158 (high school) (2013)
- Location: Cebu City, Philippines; 10°19′21″N 123°53′55″E
- Campus: Urban, 29.6526 acres (12.0000 ha)
- Newspaper: Tug-ani
- Hymn: "U.P. Naming Mahal" ("U.P. Beloved")
- Colors: UP Maroon and UP Forest Green
- Nickname: Fighting Maroons
- Website: upcebu.edu.ph

- Cebu campus location (Cebu, PH) University of the Philippines Cebu (Philippines)

The University of the Philippines Cebu (Cebuano: Unibersidad sa Pilipinas sa Sugbo; Filipino: Unibersidad ng Pilipinas sa Cebu; also referred to as UPC or UP Cebu) is a public research university and the 8th constituent university of the University of the Philippines System located in Cebu City, the capital city of Cebu province in the Philippines.

On September 24, 2010, the UP Board of Regents elevated the status of UP Cebu to that of an autonomous unit, in preparation for its elevation to the status of a constituent university of the UP System in around five to seven years. On October 27, 2016, UP Cebu was elevated to constituent university status.

== History ==
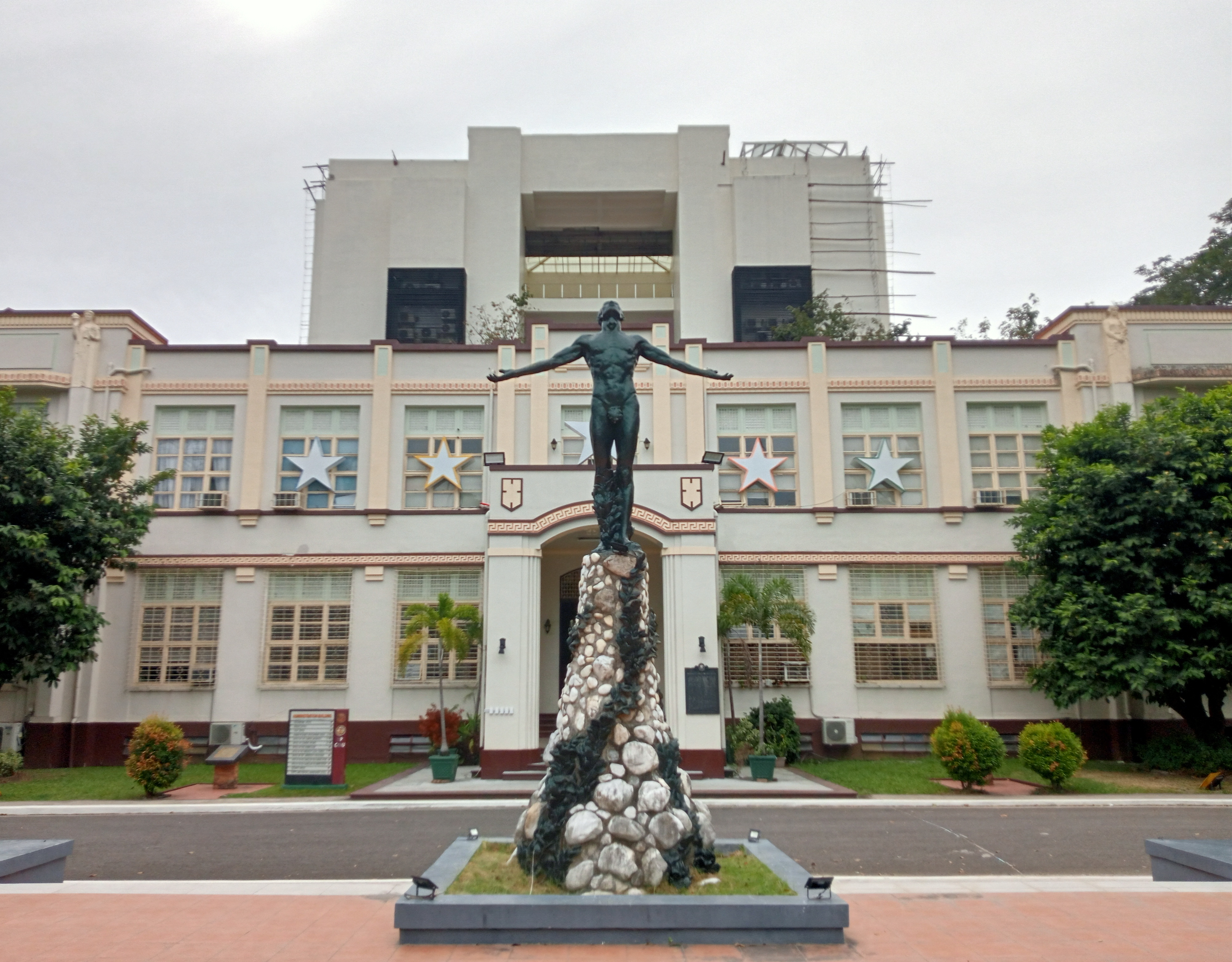
Administration Building

UP Cebu was founded on May 3, 1918, ten years after the founding of UP in 1908. It was formerly under the administrative supervision of UP Visayas, along with three other satellite campuses, namely Miag-ao campus, Iloilo City campus and Tacloban College.

Classes were once held at the Warwick Barracks in front of Leon Kilat Street in Ermita District, near where Carbon market is now. The Junior College of Liberal Arts in Cebu City was granted a 13-hectare site in Lahug plus yearly funds by the Cebu Provincial Board. In 1927, saw the completion of a two-story building, which was inaugurated by UP President Rafael Palma in 1929. The Junior College became a permanent branch of UP through Act No. 4244, enabling it to expand its role in the province.

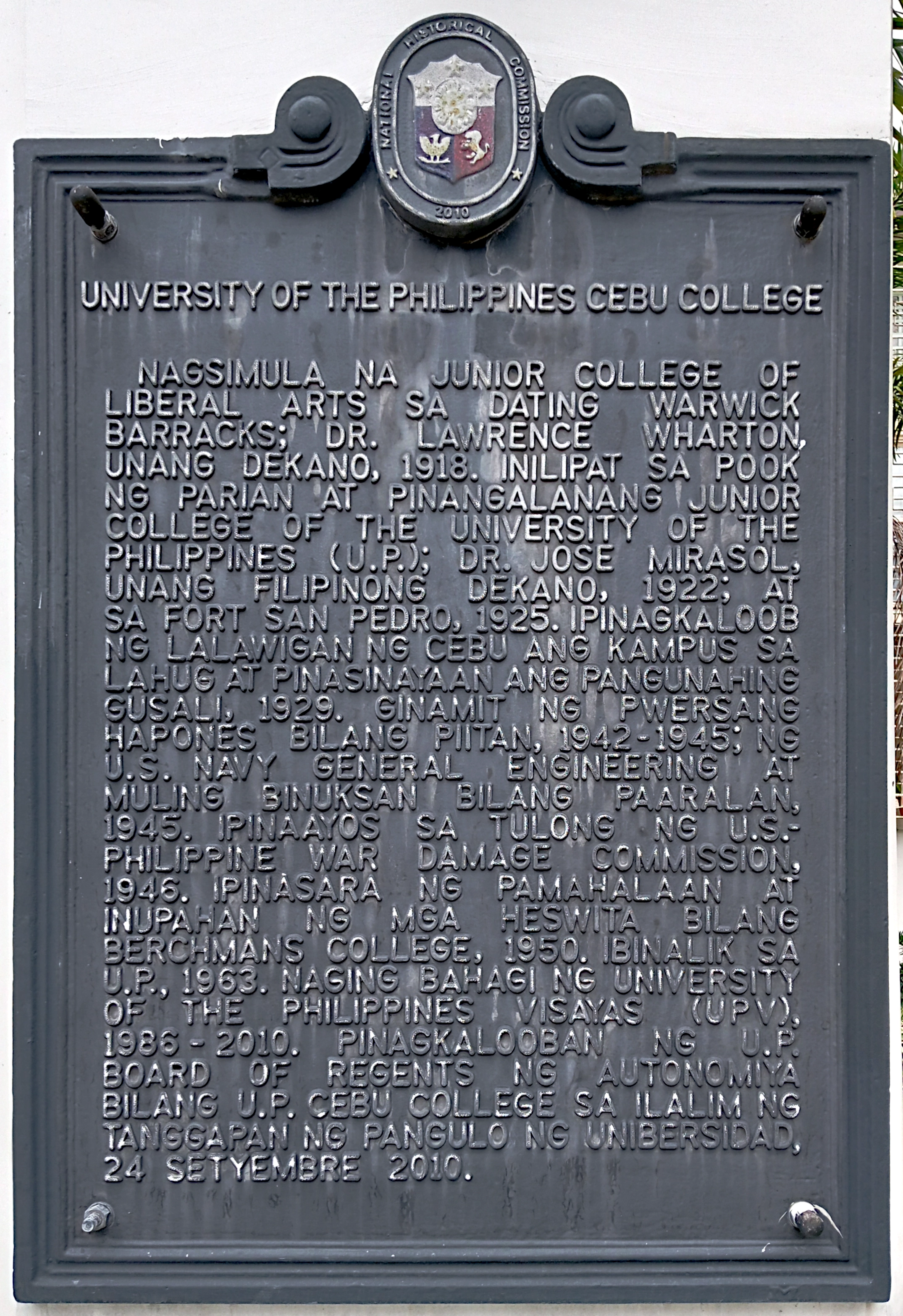
Historical marker installed in 2010

When war broke out, the College was forced to close on December 13, 1941. Its main building was used as an internment camp for American and British civilians and later as a stockade for condemned prisoners by Japanese forces. In 1945, the campus was returned to UP. The main building and athletic field, which were damaged during the war, were repaired through funds from the War Damage Commission.

In the later years, the entire collegial organization was restructured, with academic programs clustered into five disciplines, namely Management, Humanities, Natural Sciences and Mathematics, Social Sciences, and the High School. In 2010, the UP Cebu College was granted autonomy by the BOR. Then in 2011, UP Cebu grew again as construction began for its new campus in a five-hectare lot of Cebu City’s South Road Properties, which is now home to the UP Professional Schools. Finally, on the 27th of October 2016, the UP Cebu was elevated as the 8th constituent university with the installation of the former Dean to Chancellor, Atty. Liza D. Corro.

UP Cebu has undergone multiple name changes as a result of its varied history.

- 1918: Junior College of Liberal Arts
- 1922: Junior College of the Philippines
- 1930: Cebu Junior College, UP
- 1947: Cebu College, UP
- 1963: University of the Philippines Graduate School in Cebu
- 1966: University of the Philippines School in Cebu
- 1971: Cebu Branch Campus of the University of the Philippines
- 1975: University of the Philippines College Cebu
- 1987: Cebu College of the University of the Philippines Visayas
- 2010: University of the Philippines Cebu College
- 2016: University of the Philippines Cebu

== Administration ==
University of the Philippines Cebu deans and chancellors
Name	Tenure of office
Nestor Nisperos	1970's
Primitivo Cal	1980's
Soccoro Villalobos	1989-1997
Jesus Juario	1997-2003
Enrique Avila	2003-2011
Richelita Galapate (OIC)	2011-2012
Teresita J. Rodriguez (OIC)	2012
Liza D. Corro	2012–2022
Leo B. Malagar	2022–present

As a constituent university of the UP System, UP Cebu is headed by a Chancellor who serves as the chair of the University Council. Management and handling of the college's various administrative functions are divided between the following offices:

- Office of the Chancellor
- Office of the Vice Chancellor for Academic Affairs (OVCAA)
- Office of the Vice Chancellor for Administration (OVCA)
- Office of the University Registrar (OUR)
- Office of Student Affairs (OSA)
- Campus Development and Maintenance Office (CDMO)
- Colleges
  - College of Communication, Art, and Design
  - School of Management
  - College of Science
    - Department of Biology and Environmental Science
    - Department of Computer Science
    - Mathematics Program
    - Statistics Program
  - College of Social Science
  - UP High School Cebu

== Campus ==
University of the Philippines Cebu (Lahug Campus) map as of 2018

The university has two campuses. The Lahug campus is located in Gorordo Avenue, Lahug, Cebu City. It occupies a 12-hectare site which was donated by the Cebu Provincial Government in 1929; however, a fraction of the land is occupied by informal settlers. The new UP Cebu SRP campus features the UP Professional Schools which offers degree programs such as Master of Business Administration, Master of Science in Computer Science, Master of Education and Master of Science in Environmental Science.

== Academics ==
=== Admission ===
The University of the Philippines provides a diverse array of degree programs. Some are available at only one campus, while others, are offered at multiple campuses. Admission to the university is highly selective. Students who wish to enter the university must first pass the University of the Philippines College Admission Test (UPCAT) Admission to most programs requires passing the UP College Admission Test (UPCAT).

=== Degree-granting units ===
The University of the Philippines Cebu is composed of several academic units, each dedicated to specific fields of study and research. These include the College of Communication, Art, and Design, the College of Science, the College of Social Sciences, School of Management, and UP High School Cebu.

== See also ==
- State Universities and Colleges (Philippines)
- List of University of the Philippines people
- University of the Philippines Baguio
- University of the Philippines Diliman
- University of the Philippines Los Baños
- University of the Philippines Manila
- University of the Philippines Mindanao
- University of the Philippines Open University
- University of the Philippines Tacloban
- University of the Philippines Visayas
