= Gab Mejia =

Filipino conservation photographer

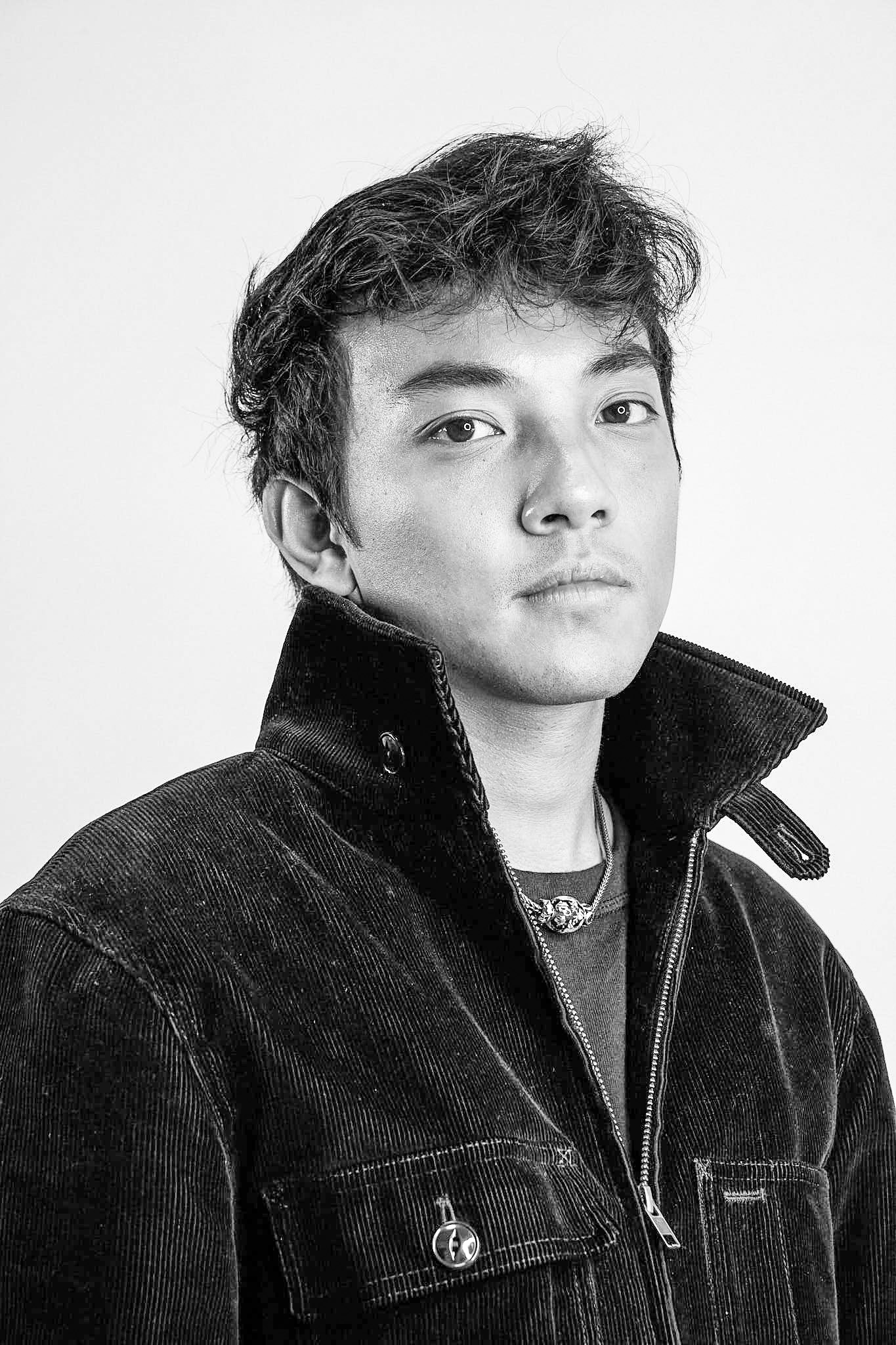
- Born: Philippines
- Education: University of the Philippines
- Occupations: Photographer, Multidisciplinary Artist
- Father: Saturnino Mejia
- Website: https://www.gabmejia.com

Gab Mejia is a Filipino conservation photographer and multidisciplinary artist based in Manila, Philippines.

== Early life and education ==
Mejia was fathered by Saturnino Mejia in the Philippines, and has three older siblings.

He completed his Bachelors of Science degree in Civil Engineering specialising on research on Environmental and Energy Engineering in the University of the Philippines.

== Photography ==
Mejia has published photographic stories on National Geographic, BBC, Vogue, Rolling Stone, the Ramsar Convention on Wetlands, World Wide Fund for Nature (WWF), CNN, UNESCO, and the United Nations Development Programme (UNDP). He has exhibited his photographic works at the National Museum of the Philippines, Grand Palais Paris, Photo London, and Fotografiska Shanghai.

In 2024, he co-created a multimedia exhibit with the Talaandig indigenous people entitled "The Baylan of Mount Kalatungan" at the National Museum of the Philippines.

He is a National Geographic Explorer, and a former columnist for The Manila Times.

== Social work ==
In 2018, he joined the World Wildlife Fund National Youth Council, and co-founded Youth Engaged in Wetlands (YEW).

Between 2018 and 2020, he worked in the Agusan Marshlands to document the struggles and progress of the Manobo Tribe in the Philippines amid climate change. Additional projects include documenting the endangered wildlife such as the Tamaraw in the Philippines.

== Awards ==
- 2017 Grand winner of Global Youth Wetlands Photo Competition by the Ramsar Convention on Wetlands
- 2018 Best Cultural Photo Award in Transformed by Travel Photo Competition by Cultural Vistas.
- 2019 National Geographic Early-Career Grant Awardee
- 2021 World Wide Fund for Nature International President's Youth Award
- 2023 Global Winner of Earth Partner Prize #CreateCOP28 by ArtPartner and the United Nations.
- 2024 Objectifs Singapore 7th Documentary Award
- 2024 The Outstanding Young Men of the Philippines Honoree
