= Antonio Oposa =

Tony Oposa
- Born: Antonio Oposa Jr. 1954 (age 71–72); Manila
- Other name: Tony Oposa
- Education: University of the Philippines Diliman (LLB); Harvard University (LLM)
- Occupations: Environmental lawyer, activist
- Known for: Environmental litigation and activism
- Awards: Ramon Magsaysay Award

Antonio "Tony" Oposa Jr. is a Filipino environmental lawyer, advocate, and activist known for pioneering environmental legal action in the Philippines. He is best known for representing children in a groundbreaking class-action lawsuit against deforestation, which helped establish legal standing for minors in environmental cases.

== Early life and education ==
Oposa earned his law degree from the University of the Philippines College of Law, and later obtained his Master of Laws degree from Harvard Law School, where he was the commencement speaker of his graduating class.

== Legal advocacy ==
In the 1990s, Oposa represented 43 children from a local village in a class-action lawsuit to stop deforestation in their area, arguing that their rights to a healthy environment were being violated. Although the lower courts initially dismissed the case due to lack of legal standing, the Supreme Court of the Philippines reversed the ruling and recognized the legal standing of children in environmental matters. The deforestation was subsequently halted. This case became internationally recognized and inspired similar youth-led environmental litigation worldwide.

In 2009, Oposa was awarded the prestigious Ramon Magsaysay Award for his efforts in environmental law and activism.

== Later work ==
Oposa currently leads The Law of Nature Foundation, an organization dedicated to promoting sustainable development and environmental education.

In 2013, he filed a case against seven individuals and government officials for violating environmental laws by contributing to noise pollution through the use of sound amplifiers during regular benefit dance events.
