= List of University of the Philippines people =

The following are lists of University of the Philippines people by categories:

- List of University of the Philippines College of Law alumni
- List of University of the Philippines Diliman people
- List of University of the Philippines Los Baños people
- List of University of the Philippines Upsilonians
