= Ricardo P. Galvez =

Filipino lawyer, judge, and academic

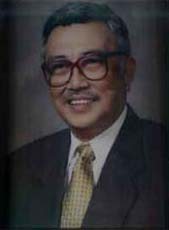

29th Solicitor General of the Philippines
- In office June 30, 1998 – February 15, 2001
- President: Joseph Estrada; Gloria Macapagal Arroyo
- Preceded by: Silvestre Bello III
- Succeeded by: Simeon V. Marcelo

Personal details
- Born: July 31, 1933
- Died: November 2, 2005 (aged 72)
- Education: University of the Philippines College of Law (LL.B)
- Profession: Lawyer

Ricardo Patiño Galvez Sr. (July 31, 1933 – November 2, 2005) was a Filipino lawyer, judge, and academic who served as Solicitor General of the Philippines from 1998 to 2001.

== Early life and education ==
Galvez was born in Nueva Valencia, Guimaras on July 31, 1933. He is the eldest of eight children of spouses Merchant Marine Captain Sisenando A. Galvez and Estrella Patiño.

He graduated from the Legarda Elementary School in Cavite and Dr. Alejandro Albert Elementary School in Dapitan, Sampaloc in 1946. For high school, he entered San Beda College in Mendiola, Manila but later transferred to University of the Philippines Visayas in Iloilo. In the same university, he finished his Associate in Arts degree in 1952. There, Galvez was a consistent medalist in oratorical contests and was elected President of the UP IIoilo Oratorical-Debating Club.

Galvez later graduated from the University of the Philippines College of Law where he graduated in 1956. There, he became a member of the Upsilon Sigma Phi fraternity. He passed the Bar Examinations with a grade of 83.95%.

== Legal career and public service ==
In 1956, Galvez began his legal career as an associate of the Manuel O. Soriano Law Offices in Western Visayas.

From 1960 to 1963, he worked as a Special Counsel for the Office of the City Fiscal in Iloilo City. In 1967, he was appointed Assistant City Fiscal, Iloilo City. In 1969, Third Assistant City Fiscal of Iloilo City. In 1970, First Assistant Provincial Fiscal of IIoilo. From 1971 to 1983, he was appointed City Fiscal of Iloilo City.

From 1983 to 1989, he was Regional Trial Judge of Cagayan de Oro City, and in 1989, was appointed Regional Trial Judge of Iloilo City. From 1991 to 1992, he was the Executive Judge of the Regional Trial Court of Iloilo Province in 1991 and 1992.

In 1992, President Corazon Aquino appointed Galvez to the Court of Appeals where he served as Chairman of its 14th Division.

In 1998, President Joseph E. Estrada appointed Galvez as Solicitor General of the Philippines. Among the prominent cases Galvez handled included the Oil Deregulation Law, the Visiting Forces Agreement, and unauthorized Meralco rate hikes.

He was a member of the Committee that drafted the 2000 Rules of Criminal Procedure. In February 2001, he submitted his courtesy resignation as Solicitor General of the Philippines after the People Power 2 Revolution. He resumed private practice as in the Tan, Acut, and Lopez Law Offices.

== Academe ==
Galvez taught law at the University of Iloilo, Central Philippine University, Xavier University in Cagayan de Oro, Manuel L. Quezon University, Far Eastern University, San Sebastian University, and the University of Perpetual Help.

He also lectured for UP Law Center's Institute of Judicial Administration and was a permanent lecturer of the Philippines Judicial Academy (PHILJA), where he served as vice chairman of its remedial law department.

He was a lecturer of the mandatory continuing legal education programs before the various chapters of the IBP throughout the Philippines. In 1996, he was a bar examiner for criminal law.

== Death ==
Galvez died on November 2, 2005.
