= Mateo Caparas =

Filipino lawyer (1923–2020)

The Honourable Mateo Armando T. Caparas

4th Chairman of the Presidential Commission on Good Government
- In office August 15, 1988 – August 31, 1990
- President: Corazon Aquino
- Preceded by: Adolfo S. Azcuna
- Succeeded by: David M. Castro

Personal details
- Born: December 28, 1923
- Died: July 15, 2020 (aged 96)
- Education: University of the Philippines Diliman; Harvard Law School
- Profession: Lawyer

Mateo Armando Tengco Caparas (December 28, 1923 – July 15, 2020) was a Filipino statesman, lawyer, and civic leader. He served as chair of the Presidential Commission on Good Government (PCGG) under the administration of President Corazon Aquino.

== Early life and education ==
Caparas was born on December 28, 1923, in Cuyapo, Philippines. His father was a lawyer who settled in Moncada, Tarlac. He finished his secondary schooling at Bulacan High School in 1940 but was interrupted by the Second World War. He graduated cum laude from the University of the Philippines College of Law in 1949, where he joined the Upsilon Sigma Phi. He later finished his Master of Laws from Harvard Law School in 1950.

== Career ==
As a lawyer, Caparas practiced in Caloocan and specialized in labor law and tax cases. In 1960, he transferred his law practice to Manila when he was invited to join the Rotary Club. He represented the province of Bulacan during the 1971 Constitutional Convention. In 1988, he was appointed chair of the Presidential Commission on Good Government tasked to retrieve the Marcos administration's ill-gotten wealth.

He is the first and only Filipino to date to be elected president of Rotary International and the only Filipino trustee of Rotary Foundation. During his presidency, Rotary started the campaign to raise $120 million to eradicate polio by 2005. The campaign reportedly generated more than $240 million in two years.

== Death ==
Caparas died on July 15, 2020, at the age of 96. He has three surviving children: Jorge, Matt, and Pilar; eight grandchildren; and two great granddaughters.
