= Rico E. Puno =

Philippine technocrat

Rico Escalona Puno is a Philippine technocrat who served as the undersecretary of the Department of the Interior and Local Government between 2010 and 2012.
