= Juan Liwag =

Filipino lawyer and politician (1906-1983)

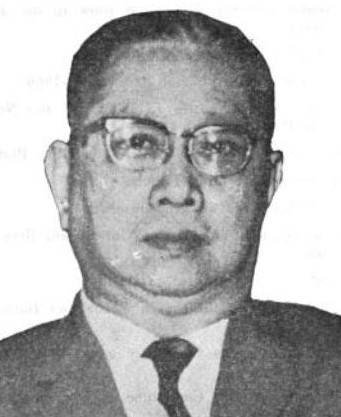

Senator of the Philippines
- In office December 30, 1963 – December 30, 1969

32nd Secretary of Justice
- In office May 20, 1962 – July 7, 1963
- President: Diosdado Macapagal
- Preceded by: Jose W. Diokno
- Succeeded by: Salvador Marino

Solicitor General of the Philippines
- In office November 10, 1952 – February 9, 1954
- President: Elpidio Quirino; Ramon Magsaysay
- Preceded by: Pompeyo Diaz
- Succeeded by: Querube Makalintal

Member of the Interim Batasang Pambansa
- In office June 12, 1978 – November 30, 1983
- Constituency: Region III

Personal details
- Born: Juan Ramos Liwag; June 12, 1906 Gapan, Nueva Ecija, Philippines (Note: The Philippines was an unincorporated territory of the United States known as the Philippine Islands at the time of Liwag's birth.)
- Died: November 30, 1983 (aged 77)
- Party: KBL (1978–1983)
- Other political affiliations: Liberal (1963–1978)
- Spouse: Consuelo Joson
- Children: 4
- Education: University of the Philippines Manila (BA, LL.B)
- Occupation: Politician
- Profession: Lawyer

Juan Ramos Liwag (June 12, 1906 – November 30, 1983) was a Filipino lawyer and politician who served as senator in the 5th and 6th Congress of the Philippines.

He was among the few Filipino officials who have served in all three branches of the government.

== Early life and education ==
Liwag was born on June 12, 1906, in Gapan, Nueva Ecija to Diego Liwag and Isabel Ramos. He finished elementary schooling as valedictorian at the Gapan Intermediate School, high school at the University of the Philippines, again as valedictorian, and subsequently hurdled the Liberal Arts course with honors. In 1932, he completed his law course at the University of the Philippines College of Law, cum laude, and placed second in the 1932 Philippine Bar Examinations. He is a member of Upsilon Sigma Phi batch 1927.

== Career ==
=== Legal career ===
In 1945, he began his public service as prosecutor in the Department of Justice, assuming later the position of head of the office of special prosecutors. Four years later, he was appointed judge-at-large of the Court of First Instance and the following year was named district judge for Albay and Catanduanes. He was appointed Solicitor General in 1952, a position he held until 1954.

President Diosdado Macapagal made him Undersecretary of Justice in early 1962 and on May 19 of that year, appointed him as Secretary. He served from May 20, 1962, to July 7, 1963. It was the time of the Stonehill scandal and as Secretary of Justice, Liwag had the huge task of prosecuting the American and his associates. In November 1962, he was appointed chairman by President Macapagal of a special committee tasked with reviewing current Philippine laws to determine those that are in need of amendments to accommodate the socio-economic program of Macapagal's administration. He was also responsible for busting the credit scandal in the Philippine National Bank and the naturalization racket that had flourished unabated over the years.

Liwag declared the daily wage of ₱2 of emergency employment administration workers as unconstitutional and inhuman. In his own department, he secured salary increases for judges, solicitors, fiscals, prosecutors and court personnel.

=== Political career ===
As a member of the Senate, from 1963 to 1969, Liwag headed two important committees—the Committee on Revision of Laws and the Committee on Government Reorganization. He became a member of the committees on accounts, economy, investigation, justice, labor and immigration, national defense and public works and communications.

In 1970, he was elected to represent the 2nd district of Nueva Ecija at the 1971 Constitutional Convention.

== Death and legacy ==
Senator Liwag died on November 30, 1983.

In his honor, the main public high school in his hometown, Gapan, was renamed Juan R. Liwag Memorial High School through Batas Pambansa Blg. 858 on 27 April 1984. Liwag was responsible for elevating the status of the school to a national high school.

== Personal life ==
He was married to Consuelo Joson with whom he had four children namely Diego, Ramon, Aurelio and Rita.
