= Upsilon Sigma Phi =

Filipino college fraternity

- ΥΣΦ
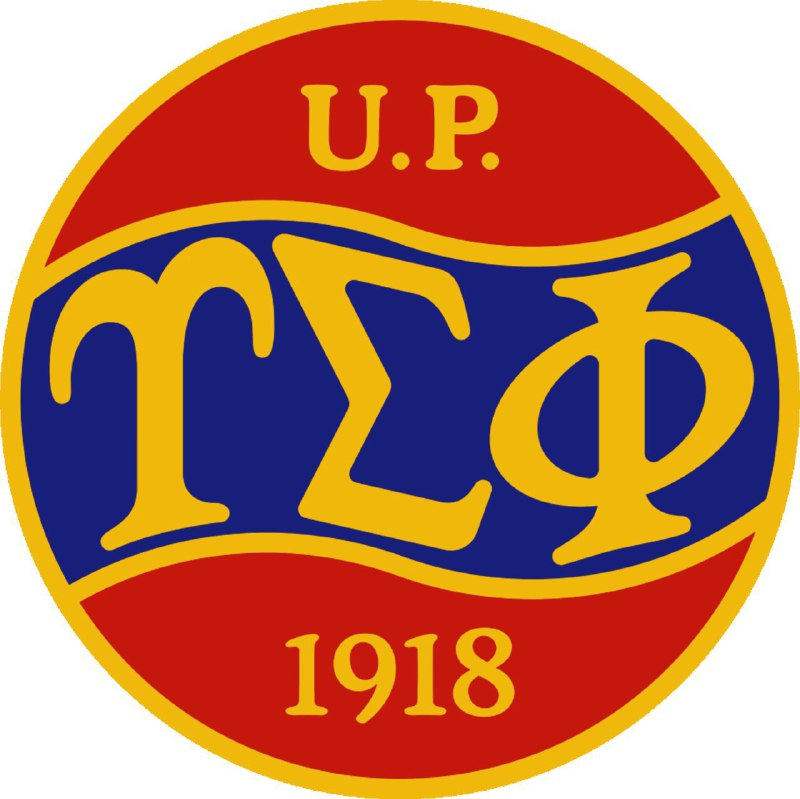
- Founded: 1918; 108 years ago University of the Philippines Manila
- Type: Traditional
- Affiliation: Independent
- Status: Active
- Emphasis: Social
- Scope: National (Philippines)
- Motto: "We Gather Light to Scatter"
- Slogan: "The years cannot break us"
- Colors: Cardinal Red; Honorable Blue; Gold
- Flower: Pink rose
- Chapters: 2
- Nickname: Oldest Born, Greatest Known
- Headquarters: University of the Philippines Diliman; Quezon City; Philippines
- Website: talentium.ph/upsilon/

The Upsilon Sigma Phi (ΥΣΦ) is the oldest Greek-letter organization and fraternity in Asia. Founded in 1918, it is also the oldest student organization in continuous existence in the University of the Philippines. It has two chapters—an integrated chapter for the UP Diliman and the UP Manila campuses, and a separate one for the UP Los Baños campus.

== History ==
=== Early years ===
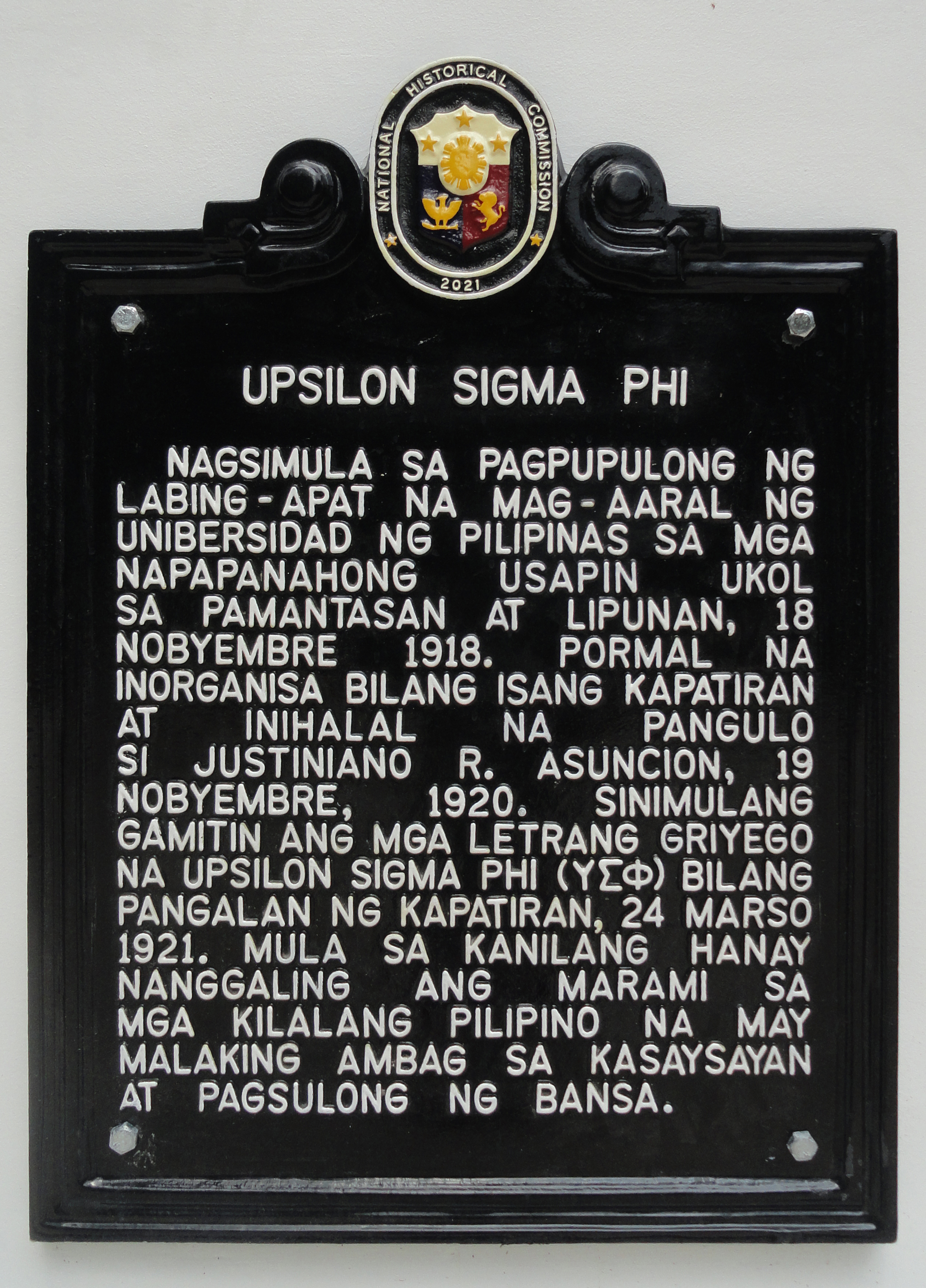
Historical marker installed at the UP Diliman campus in 2022

The Upsilon Sigma Phi was founded in 1918 by twelve students and two professors from the University of the Philippines Manila.

It was formally organized on November 19, 1920, in a meeting held at the Metropolitan Restaurant in Intramuros, Manila, where the fraternity elected its first officers (among which include Agapito del Rosario, one of the founders of the Socialist Party of the Philippines and later on Mayor of Angeles, Pampanga). Four months later, on March 24, 1921, the Greek letters ΥΣΦ were formally adopted, along with themes, rites, and motto.

During its early years, Upsilon Sigma Phi invited individuals with exceptional leadership potential or achievements to its ranks. Notable members during the 1920s include José Abad Santos, Carmelino G. Alvendia, Teodoro M. Kalaw, Juan Liwag, and Antonio Quirino.

From 1930 to 1949, then UP Student Council President Wenceslao Vinzons, together with fraternity members, led demonstrations before the Philippine Congress to protest the insertion of a provision in the appropriations act that gave lawmakers a salary increase. In 1933, five female UP students established the Sigma Delta Phi—which became the sister sorority of Upsilon.

In 1947, a chapter at UP Los Baños was established; the first Greek-letter organization on the campus. After the Battle of Manila, the UP administration relocated to the Diliman campus in 1949. Through the efforts of the UP Alumni Association headed by Upsilon member Hermenegildo R. Reyes Sr., the fraternity helped raise funds for the construction of the bell tower called the "Carillon".

During the same period, the fraternity hosted the Cavalcades, a series of stage plays and musicals that began on campus and eventually toured nationwide. Profits from Aloyan (the first full-length English play written by a Filipino) and Hanako plays were used to help finance the construction and furnishing of the Church of the Holy Sacrifice. One of the fraternity's productions, Linda, cast the then seventeen-year-old Pilita Corrales.

=== Recent years ===
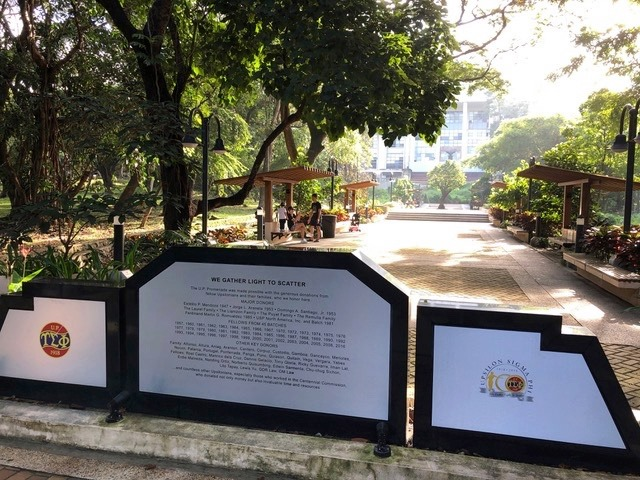
UP Promenade

In 2013, the fraternity was named as a finalist in the Ten Accomplished Youth Organizations (TAYO) Awards, which recognize and support the outstanding contributions of youth organizations to the country.

On July 25, 2018, the Malacañang Palace issued Proclamation Order No. 539 recognizing the fraternity for its "significant contributions to numerous civic and humanitarian causes, as well as the dedication and commitment of its members to public service and nation-building." The year 2018 was also declared the "Year for the Celebration of the Centennial Anniversary of the Upsilon Sigma Phi".

In the same year, the fraternity dedicated the UP Promenade, a 120-meter public walkway with Internet and Wi-Fi capable facilities, at UP Diliman. In the Los Baños campus, the fraternity gave the Kapit-Kapit Monument, which depicts 14 individuals with their arms locked in solidarity.

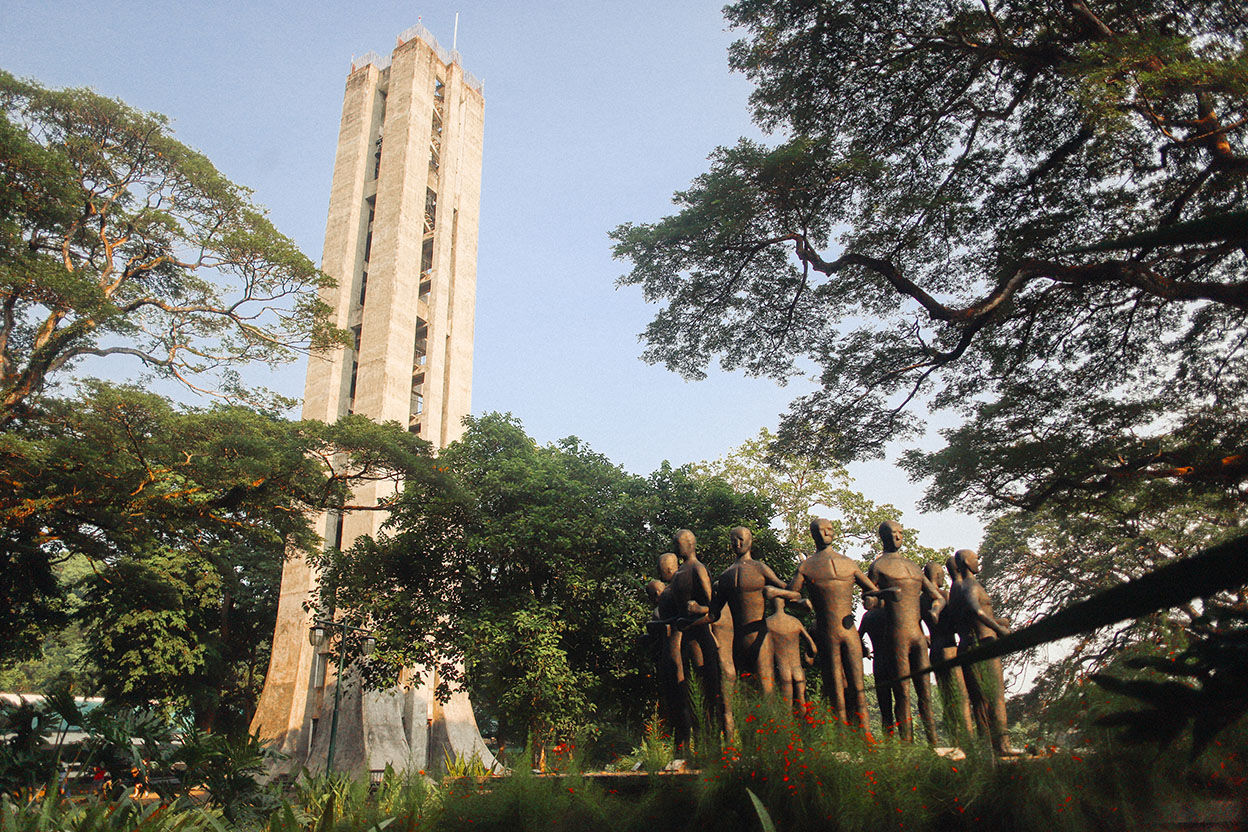
Kapit-Kapit Monument at UP Los Baños

In 2022, the National Historical Commission of the Philippines unveiled the "Upsilon Sigma Phi" historical marker on the Diliman campus for the fraternity's 104th anniversary,

== Symbols ==
The Greek letters ΥΣΦ are the initials of the name "University Students Fraternity". The fraternity's motto is "We Gather Light to Scatter". Upsilon Sigma Phi members are called Fellows or Upsilonians.

The fraternity's colors are cardinal red, honorable blue, and gold. Red symbolizes courage and bravery, blue represents loyalty, and gold symbolizes excellence. Its flower is the pink rose.

== Membership ==
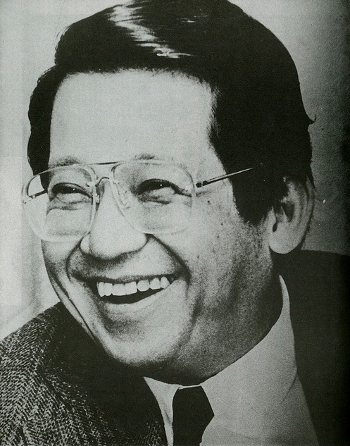
Benigno Aquino Jr.

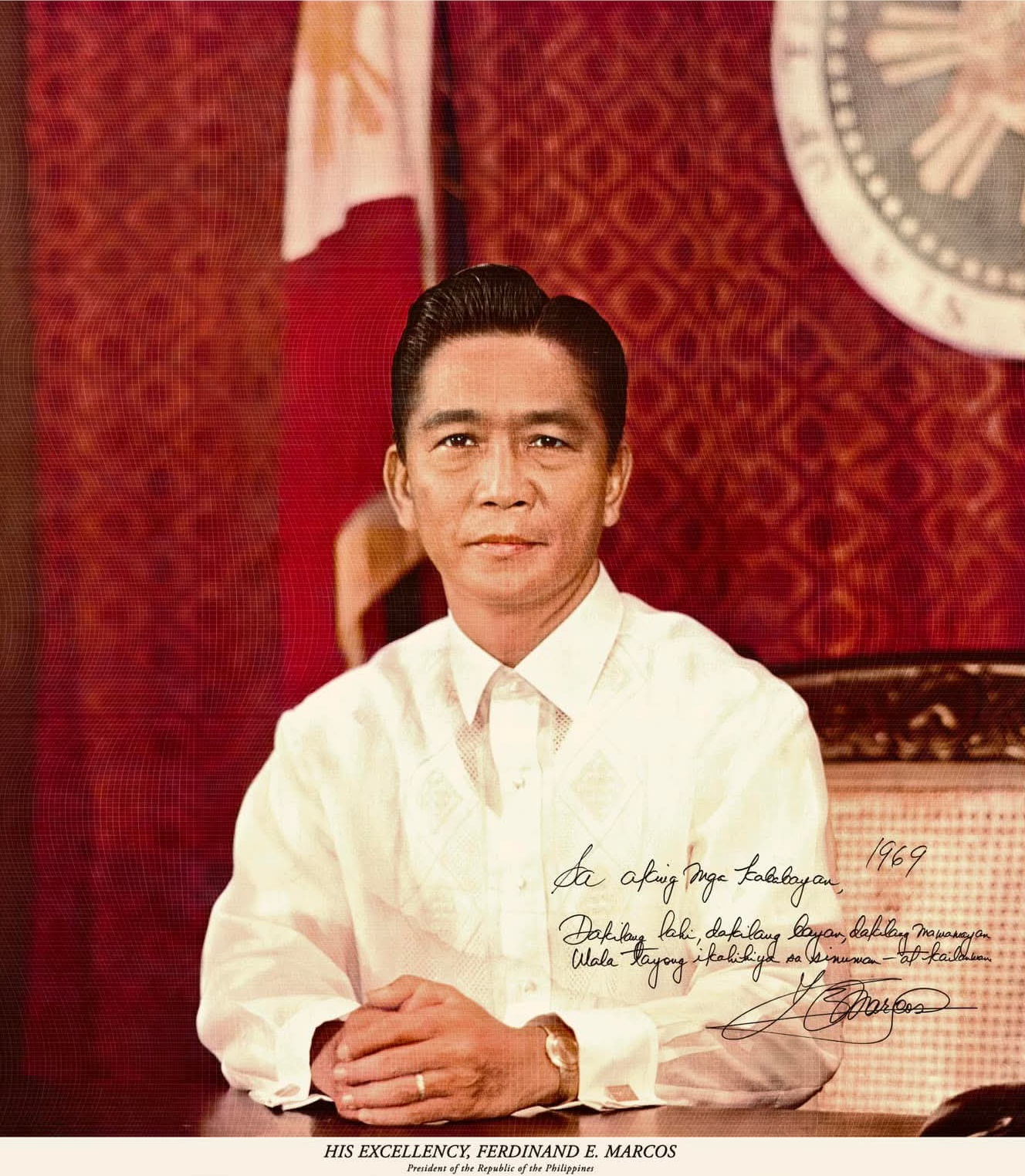
Ferdinand E. Marcos

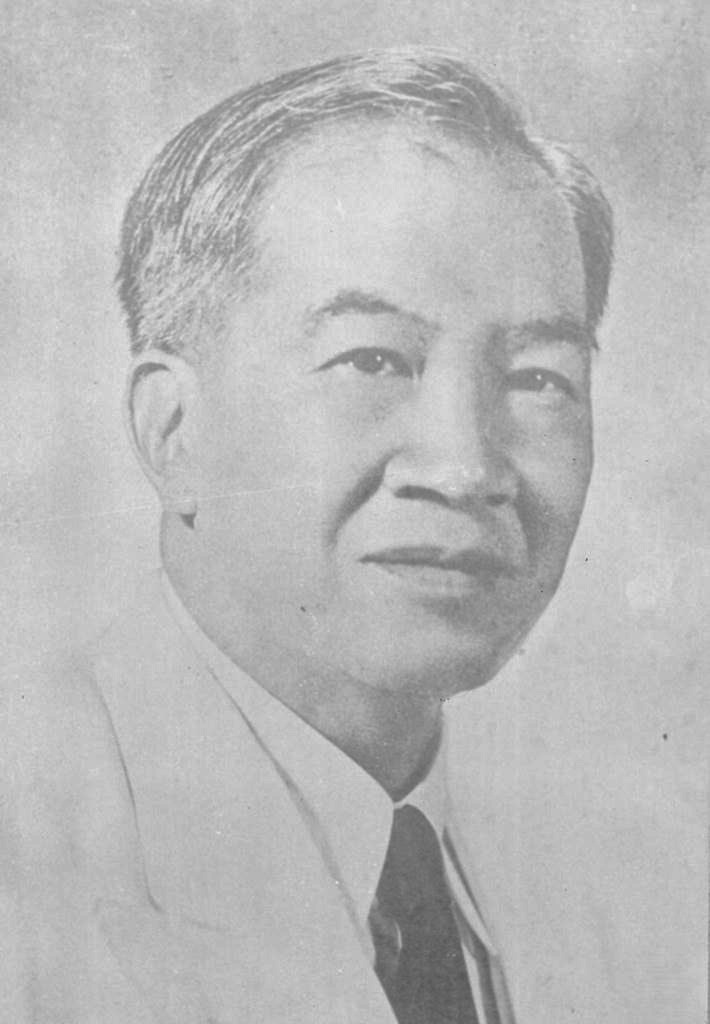
José P. Laurel

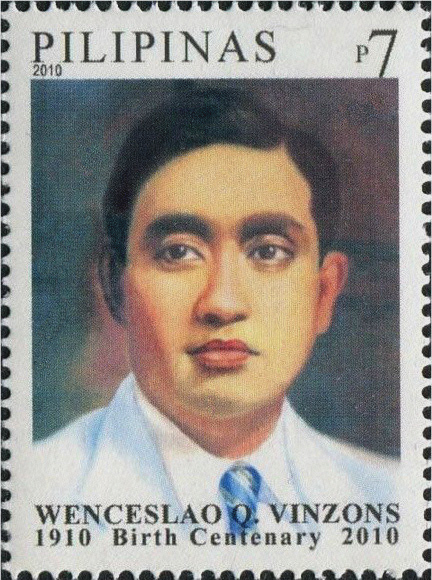
Wenceslao Vinzons

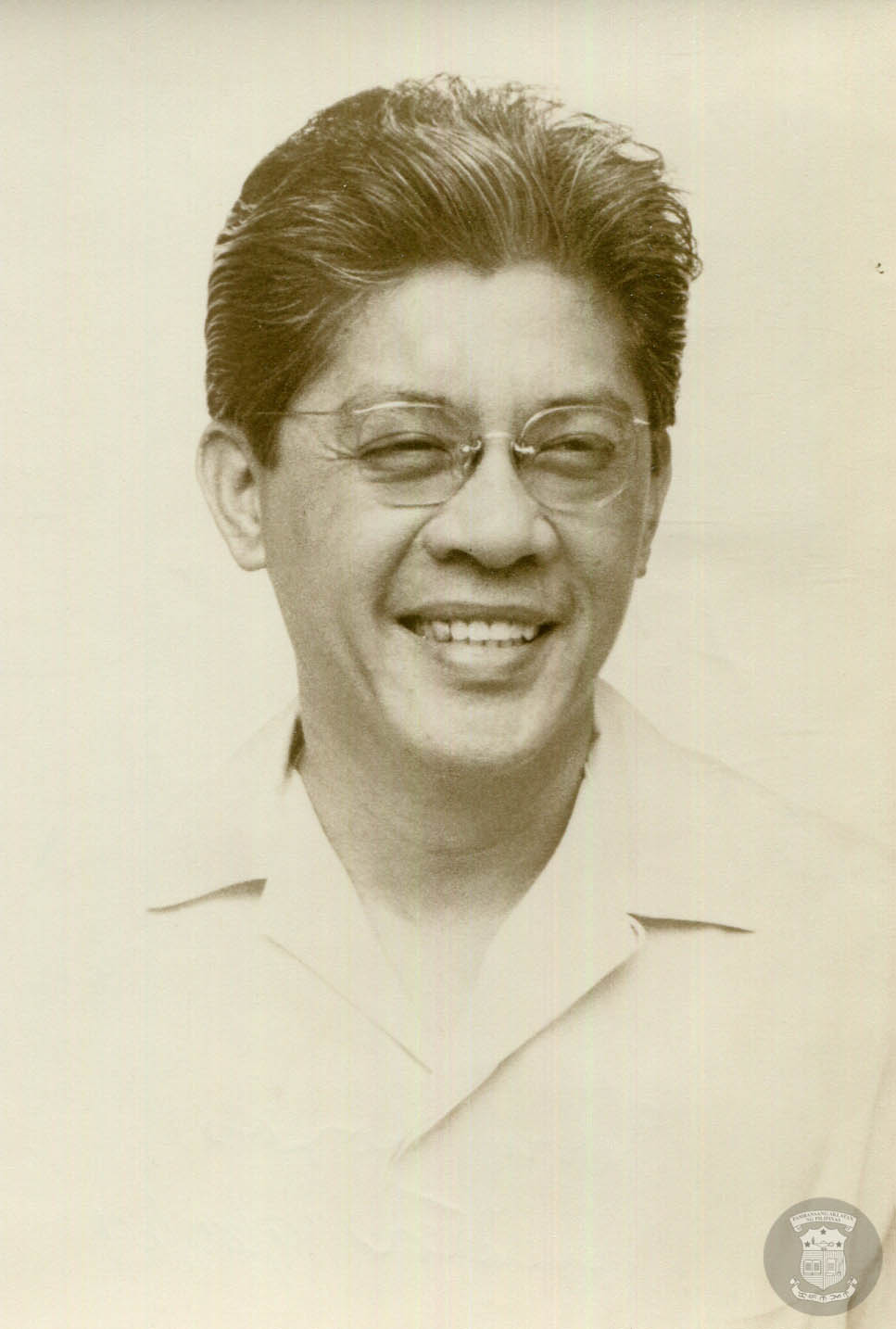
Gerardo Roxas

Membership is by invitation only and is exclusive to male individuals in the University of the Philippines Diliman, Manila, and Los Baños campuses. Selection is based on an individual's leadership positions and potential success and prominence in their respective fields (both on- and off-campus).

== Notable members ==
Among its alumni are two Philippine presidents, a vice president, 15 senators, 14 supreme court justices (including three chief justices), three house speakers, a chairman of the United Nations Commission on Human Rights, three executive secretaries, four solicitors-general, 26 ambassadors, an AFP chief of staff, a NEDA director-general, a Central Bank governor, 24 honorees of The Outstanding Young Men, four national scientists, three national artists, a recipient of the Ramon Magsaysay Award, and five UP presidents.

Following are a select number of notable members:

- Gémino Abad - National Artist of the Philippines for Literature, literary critic, poet
- Jorge Araneta – billionaire businessman; Chairman, Araneta Group of Companies; director, 7-Eleven Philippines
- Joker Arroyo – Senator; Executive Secretary; Makati Representative; founder of Free Legal Assistance Group (FLAG)
- Ninoy Aquino – Senator; Tarlac Governor; founder, Lakas ng Bayan; recipient, Quezon Service Cross
- Danilo Concepcion – President, University of the Philippines; Representative, Interim Batasang Pambansa
- Onofre Corpuz – Minister of Education; Secretary of Education; President of the University of the Philippines; Member of the Interim Batasang Pambansa; National Scientist; Academician, National Academy of Science and Technology
- Jose Encarnacion Jr. – National Scientist for Economics; Dean, UP School of Economics
- Dick Gordon – Senator; Chairman, Philippine Red Cross; founding Chairman, Subic Bay Metropolitan Authority; delegate, 1970 Constitutional Convention
- Ted Herbosa - Secretary of Health; President, 78th World Health Assembly
- Teodoro Kalaw – Father of the Philippine Library System; Batangas Representative; Interior Secretary
- Doy Laurel – 8th Philippine Vice President; 5th Prime Minister; Senator; founder, United Nationalist Democratic Organization (UNIDO)
- José Laurel Jr. – 9th Speaker of the House of Representatives; Batangas Representative
- José P. Laurel – 3rd Philippine President; Senator; Justice of the Supreme Court
- Salvador P. Lopez - Filipino writer, journalist, educator, diplomat, and statesman
- Tony Mabesa – National Artist of the Philippines for theater, actor, director, pioneer of Philippine university theater
- Ferdinand Marcos – 10th Philippine President; 3rd Prime Minister; 11th Senate President, Ilocos Norte Representative, World War II veteran, bar topnotcher
- Querube Makalintal – 11th Chief Justice of the Supreme Court; 14th Speaker of the House of Representatives; Solicitor General
- Mel Mathay – Quezon City Mayor; Quezon City Representative; Chairman, Metropolitan Manila Authority (MMDA)
- Christian Monsod – Chairman, COMELEC; member, Constitutional Commission of 1986
- Kiko Pangilinan – Senator; President, Liberal Party
- Alfredo Pascual – Secretary of Trade and Industry; President and Regent, University of the Philippines
- Gil Puyat – 13th Senate President; founder, Manila Banking Corporation (now China Bank Savings)
- Antonio Quirino – founder of the first television station in the Philippines, Alto Broadcasting System (ABS-CBN)
- Boying Remulla – Secretary of Justice; Cavite's 3rd district Representative; Deputy Speaker
- Jonvic Remulla – Secretary of Interior and Local Government, Governor of Cavite
- Martin Romualdez – Speaker, House of Representatives; House Majority Leader, Leyte Representative; National President, Lakas–CMD
- Roman Romulo – Pasig Representative; Chairperson, House Committee on Higher and Technical Education
- Gerry Roxas – Senate Minority Leader; Capiz Representative; lawyer; founder, Gerry Roxas Foundation
- José Abad Santos – Acting Philippine President; 5th Chief Justice of the Supreme Court; Secretary of Justice
- Kidlat Tahimik – National Artist for Film
- Arturo Tolentino – Senate President; head of the Philippine delegation, UN Convention on the Law of the Sea
- Wenceslao Vinzons – Camarines Norte Governor; "Father of Student Activism in the Philippines"; member, 1934 Constitutional Convention
- Nicanor Yñiguez – 15th Speaker of the House of Representatives; Southern Leyte Representative

== UNO Awards ==
The Upsilonian Noble and Outstanding (UNO) Awards are among the highest honors conferred by the Upsilon Sigma Phi Alumni Association, recognizing members whose lives, careers, and service exemplify the fraternity's core values of brotherhood, integrity, excellence, leadership, and service. The awards are presented to distinguished alumni across a variety of fields, including law, medicine, business, public service, education, and community development, and are intended to acknowledge lifetime achievement and significant contributions to society.

The UNO Awards were instituted in 1985 and are considered the fraternity's most prestigious individual honor. Recipients are selected by a committee of past awardees and senior members who assess nominees based on their adherence to the fraternity's imperatives and their impact on national and community life.

Ceremonies are traditionally held during major alumni gatherings, such as the Upsilon Sigma Phi Biennial Congress. For instance, in 2023 the awards were presented to eighteen fellows during the fraternity's 19th Congress at the University of the Philippines Diliman, reflecting achievements in diverse sectors including law, journalism, medicine, engineering, and public administration. In 2025, the UNO Awards ceremony took place at the Goldenberg Mansion in San Miguel, Manila, where winners were honored alongside the fraternity's 20th Biennial Congress.

Notable awardees have included legal luminaries, prominent public servants, and leaders in education and industry, highlighting the fraternity's long tradition of producing influential figures in Philippine society.

== Member and chapter misconduct ==
=== Hazing incidents ===
On July 18, 1954, a UP student recruit, Gonzalo Mariano M. Albert, died in the wake of the fraternity's initiation proceedings. After experiencing abdominal pain, the student was rushed to a hospital where he was diagnosed to undergo an emergency appendectomy but succumbed on the operating table. Philippine President Ramon Magsaysay assigned an ad hoc medico-legal committee, that failed to indicate that hazing "contributed to Albert's death" in their findings; albeit which jeopardized his physical condition before the patient's appendectomy. The committee further recommended the expulsion of four officers of the fraternity, implicated residents and neophytes being suspended, and a censure of several UP deans, directors, and faculty members for their collective remiss to discharge proactive duties. Albert's death was the first recorded fatality attributed to hazing in the Philippines, and the only known demise of an Upsilon Sigma Phi neophyte.

On July 4, 2014, the fraternity was once again implicated in the hazing of a seventeen-year-old neophyte who sustained physical injuries during fraternity initiation.

=== Inter-fraternity brawl and group chat leaks ===
On September 20, 1969, Upsilon member Rolando S. L. Perez was killed by members of the rival Beta Sigma fraternity. It was the first publicly documented fatality of a fraternity "rumble" (brawl) in the University of the Philippines, prompting UP president Salvador P. Lopez to issue stringent regulations affecting university organizations, and suspended both the Upsilon Sigma Phi and Beta Sigma fraternities.

On June 18, 2015, Quezon City police arrested five Upsilon members after allegedly mauling three rival fraternity members and leading police in a brief car chase while fleeing. The five members were released on June 24, 2015, upon posting bail of ₱200,000 each on frustrated homicide charges, and ₱80,000 each for illegal possession of ammunition.

On November 14, 2018, rival fraternities Upsilon Sigma Phi and Alpha Phi Beta were recorded on campus CCTV in a brawl. The incident prompted campus authorities to tighten security within the UP system and a statement of condemnation from Diliman chancellor Michael Tan and UP president Danilo Concepcion, himself an Upsilon member. The same month, screenshots of a Facebook Messenger group chat of alleged Upsilon members containing misogynistic and discriminatory messages was leaked via Twitter. The fraternity was again censured by Concepcion as "reprehensible and totally unacceptable" language.

== See also ==
- List of fraternities and sororities in the Philippines
