= List of cabinets of the Philippines =

The following is a list of Cabinets of the Philippines by the president of the Philippines under which they operated.

== Emilio Aguinaldo (1899–1901) ==
Office	Name	Term
President	Emilio Aguinaldo	January 23, 1899 – April 19, 1901
Prime Minister	Apolinario Mabini	January 2 – May 7, 1899
Prime Minister	Pedro Paterno	May 7 – November 13, 1899 (Note: Several sources assert that shortly after installation of the Paterno cabinet, General Antonio Luna arrested Paterno and some or all of the cabinet secretaries. At least one source asserts that the Mabini cabinet was reinstalled after the arrests. Another source asserts that those arrested were released on orders of President Aguinaldo, but does not provide any indication about whether the Mabini or the Paterno cabinet was in office after the release.)
Secretary of Foreign Affairs	Apolinario Mabini	October 1, 1898 – May 7, 1899
Secretary of the Interior	Teodoro Sandico	January 2 – May 7, 1899
Secretary of Finance	Mariano Trías	January 2 – May 7, 1899
Secretary of Finance	Hugo Ilagan	May 7 – November 13, 1899
Secretary of Finance	Severino de las Alas	May 7 – November 13, 1899
Secretary of War and Marine	Baldomero Aguinaldo	July 15, 1898 – May 7, 1899
Secretary of War and Marine	Mariano Trías	May 7 – November 13, 1899
Secretary of Justice	Gregorio Araneta	September 2, 1898 – May 7, 1899
Secretary of Welfare (Note: In the Mabini cabinet, the secretary of welfare had responsibility for public instruction, communications & public works, and agriculture, industry & commerce.)	Gracio Gonzaga	January 2 – May 7, 1899
Secretary of Welfare	Felipe Buencamino	May 7 – November 13, 1899
Secretary of Welfare	Maximino Paterno	May 7 – November 13, 1899
Secretary of Agriculture, Industry and Commerce	León María Guerrero	May 7 – November 13, 1899

== Manuel L. Quezon (1935–1944) ==
=== Appointments (1935–1941) ===
Office	Name	Term
President	Manuel L. Quezon	1935–1941
Vice President	Sergio Osmeña	1935–1941
Secretary of Agriculture and Commerce	Benigno Aquino	1938–1940
Secretary of Agriculture and Commerce	Rafael Alunan Sr.	1940–1941
Secretary of Public Instruction	Sergio Osmeña	November 15, 1935 – December 1, 1938
Secretary of Public Instruction	Manuel L. Quezon	December 1, 1938 – April 19, 1939
Secretary of Public Instruction	Jorge Bocobo	April 19, 1939 – January 22, 1941
Secretary of Finance	Elpidio Quirino	November 15, 1935 – February 18, 1936
Secretary of Finance	Antonio de las Alas	February 18, 1936 – November 15, 1938
Secretary of Finance	Manuel Roxas	November 26, 1938 – August 28, 1941
Secretary of Finance	Serafin Marabut	August 28, 1941 – December 29, 1941
Secretary of the Interior	Elpidio Quirino	1935–1938
Secretary of the Interior	Rafael Alunan Sr.	1938–1940
Secretary of Justice	José Yulo	November 15, 1935 – November 1938
Secretary of Justice	José Abad Santos	December 5, 1938 – July 16, 1941
Commissioner of Justice	Teófilo Sisón	July 18, 1941 – November 1941
Secretary of Public Works and Communications	Mariano Jesús Cuenco	1935–1941
Secretary of National Defense	Teófilo Sisón	1939–1941
Secretary of National Defense	Jorge B. Vargas	December 11, 1941 – December 22, 1941
Secretary of National Defense	Basilio Valdes	December 23, 1941
Secretary of Labor	José Avelino	1935–1938
Secretary of Labor	Hermenegildo Villanueva	1938–1939
Secretary of Labor	Sotero Baluyut	1939–1941
Secretary to the President	Jorge B. Vargas	1935–1941
Auditor-General	Jaime Hernández	1935–1941
Solicitor General	Pedro T. Tuason	1936–1938
Solicitor General	Roman Ozaeta	1938–1940
Solicitor General	Lorenzo M. Tañada	1940–1941
Commissioner of the Budget	Serafin Marabut	1935–1941
Commissioner of Civil Service	José Gil	1935–1941
Resident Commissioner of the Philippines to the United States Congress	Quintín Paredes	1935–1938
Resident Commissioner of the Philippines to the United States Congress	Joaquín Miguel Elizalde	1938–1941

=== War Cabinet (1941–1944) ===
The outbreak of World War II and the Japanese invasion resulted in periodic and drastic changes to the government structure. Executive Order 390, December 22, 1941, abolished the Department of the Interior and established a new line of succession. Executive Order 396, December 24, 1941, further reorganized and grouped the cabinet, with the functions of secretary of justice assigned to the chief justice of the Supreme Court of the Philippines.

Office	Name	Term
President	Manuel L. Quezon	1941–1944 (extended, 1943)
Vice President	Sergio Osmeña	1941–1944 (extended, 1943)
Secretary of Finance	José Abad Santos	December 30, 1941 – March 26, 1942
Secretary of Justice	José Abad Santos	March 26, 1942 – May 2, 1942
Secretary of Finance, Agriculture, and Commerce	Andrés Soriano	March 26, 1942 – July 31, 1944
Secretary of National Defense, Public Works, Communications and Labor	Basilio Valdes	December 23, 1941 – August 1, 1944
Secretary of Public Instruction, Health, and Public Welfare	Sergio Osmeña	December 24, 1941 – August 1, 1944
Secretary to the President	Manuel Roxas	December 24, 1941 – March 26, 1942
	Arturo Rotor	June 13, 1942 – August 1, 1944
Secretary to the Cabinet	Manuel Nieto	May 19, 1944 – August 1, 1944
Secretary without Portfolio	Andrés Soriano	March 2–26, 1942
Treasurer of the Philippines	Andrés Soriano	February 19, 1942 – March 26, 1942
Treasurer of the Philippines	Manuel Roxas	March 26, 1942 – May 8, 1942
Auditor-General	Jaime Hernández	December 30, 1941 – August 1, 1944
Resident Commissioner of the Philippines to the United States Congress	Joaquín Miguel Elizalde	December 30, 1941 – August 1, 1944 (given cabinet rank, May 1942)
Secretary of Information and Public Relations	Carlos P. Rómulo	1943–1944
Sources: The Sixth Annual Report of the United States High Commission to the Philippine Island to the President and Congress of the United States, Covering the Fiscal Year July 1, 1941, to June 30, 1942, Washington D.C. October 20, 1942; Executive Orders of the Commonwealth of the Philippines, Manila, Bureau of Printing 1945

== Jose P. Laurel (1943–1945) ==
Office	Name	Term
President	José P. Laurel	1943–1945
Minister of Agriculture and Commerce	Rafael Alunan Sr.	1943–1945
Minister of Health, Labor and Public Instructions	Emiliano Tría Tirona	1943–1945
Minister of Finance	Antonio de las Alas	1943–1945
Minister of Foreign Affairs	Claro M. Recto	1943–1945
Minister of Justice	Quintín Paredes	1943–1945
Minister of Education	Camilo Osías	1943–1945

== Sergio Osmeña (1944–1946) ==
=== War Cabinet (1944–1945) ===
On August 8, 1944, President Osmeña issued Executive Order 15-W reorganizing and consolidating the executive departments of the Commonwealth government. The reorganization of the government after it was reestablished on Philippine soil was undertaken with Executive Order No. 27; February 27, 1945.

Office	Name	Term
President	Sergio Osmeña	1944–1946
Secretary of Finance	Jaime Hernández	August 24, 1944 – February 27, 1945
Secretary of National Defense and Communications	Basilio Valdes	August 1, 1944 – February 6, 1945
Secretary of Public Relations	Carlos P. Romulo (concurrent capacity)	1944–1945
Secretary of Justice, Labor and Welfare	Mariano A. Eraña (acting capacity)	1944–1945
Secretary of Agriculture and Commerce	Manuel Nieto	1944–1945
Secretary to the President	Arturo Rotor	1944–1945
Resident Commissioner of the Philippines to the United States Congress	Carlos P. Romulo	1944–1945
Budget and Finance Commissioner	Ismael Mathay	1944–1945
Judge Advocate General of the Army	Mariano Eraña	1944–1945
Economic Adviser	Urbano Zafra	1944–1945
Military Adviser	Alejandro Melchor	1944–1945

=== Cabinet and judicial appointments (1945–1946) ===
Executive Order No. 27; February 27, 1945, was issued upon the restoration of civilian authority to the government of the Commonwealth, and members of the new cabinet appointed on March 8, 1945. Subsequent renaming and mergers of departments have separate listings.

Office	Name	Term
President	Sergio Osmeña	1944–1946
Secretary of the Interior	Tomás Confesor	March 8, 1945 – July 10, 1945
Secretary of Finance and Reconstruction	Jaime Hernández	February 27, 1945 – May 27, 1946
Secretary of Justice, Agriculture and Commerce	Delfin Jaranilla	February 1945 – December 1945
Secretary of Justice	Ramon Quisumbing	December 28, 1945 – May 28, 1946
Secretary of Agriculture and Commerce	Vicente Singson Encarnación	February 27, 1945 – May 28, 1946
Secretary of National Defense	Tomás Cabili	February 27, 1945 – July 11, 1945
Secretary of National Defense	Alfredo Montelibano Sr.	July 12, 1945 – May 27, 1946
Secretary of Health and Public Welfare	Basilio Valdes	February 27, 1945 – April 1945
Secretary of Health and Public Welfare	José Locsin	June 29, 1945 – 1946
Secretary of Public Instruction	Maximo Kalaw	February 27, 1945 – May 4, 1945
Secretary of Public Instruction	Jose Reyes	May 5, 1945 – January 7, 1946
Secretary of Public Instruction	Francisco Benitez	January 7, 1946 – May 27, 1946
Secretary of Public Works and Communications	Sotero Cabahug	1945–1946
Secretary of the Budget	Ismael Mathay	1944–1945
Secretary to the President	José S. Reyes	1945–1946
Secretary of Labor	Marcelo Adduru	1946
Resident Commissioner of the Philippines to the United States Congress	Carlos P. Romulo	1945–1946
Commissioner of the Office of Foreign Relations	Vicente G. Sinco	1945–1946
Solicitor General	Lorenzo M. Tañada	1945–1947

== Manuel Roxas (1946–1948) ==
Office	Name	Term
President	Manuel Roxas	May 28, 1946 – April 15, 1948
Vice-President	Elpidio Quirino	May 28, 1946 – April 17, 1948
Secretary of Foreign Affairs	Elpidio Quirino	July 5, 1946 – April 17, 1948
Secretary of the Interior	Jose Zulueta	May 28, 1946 – April 17, 1948
Secretary of Finance	Elpidio Quirino	May 28, 1946 – November 23, 1946
Secretary of Finance	Miguel Cuaderno	November 24, 1946 – April 17, 1948
Secretary of Justice	Roman Ozaeta	May 28, 1946 – April 17, 1948
Secretary of Agriculture and Commerce	Mariano Garchitorena	May 28, 1946 – April 17, 1948
Secretary of Public Works and Communications	Ricardo Nepumoceno	May 28, 1946 – April 17, 1948
Secretary of Public Instruction	Manuel Gallego	May 28, 1946 – April 17, 1948
Secretary of Labor and Employment	Pedro Magsalin	May 28, 1946 – April 17, 1948
Secretary of National Defense	Ruperto Kangleon	May 28, 1946 – April 17, 1948
Secretary of Health and Public Welfare	Antonio Villarama	May 28, 1946 – April 17, 1948
Secretary of Commerce and Industry	Cornelio Balmaceda	1947
Commissioner of Social Welfare	Asuncion A. Perez	1946
Commissioner of Social Welfare	Antonio Villarama	1946–1948
General Auditing Office	Sotero Cabahug	1945–1946
Secretary to the President	Emilio M. Abello	May 30, 1946 – July 4, 1946
Chief of the Executive Office	Emilio M. Abello	July 4, 1946 – September 3, 1947
Chief of the Executive Office	Nicanor Roxas	September 10, 1947 – October 3, 1947
Executive Secretary	Nicanor Roxas	October 4, 1947 – February 6, 1948
Executive Secretary	Emilio M. Abello	February 26, 1948 – April 17, 1948
Solicitor General	Manuel Lim	1947–1948
Resident Commissioner of the Philippines to the United States Congress	Carlos P. Romulo	1946–1947

== Elpidio Quirino (1948–1953) ==
Office	Name	Term
President	Elpidio Quirino	1948–1953
Vice-President	Fernando Lopez	1949–1953
Secretary of Foreign Affairs	Joaquín Miguel Elizalde	1948–1950
Secretary of Foreign Affairs	Carlos P. Romulo	1950–1952
Secretary of Foreign Affairs	Joaquín Miguel Elizalde	1952–1953
Secretary of the Interior	Sotero Baluyut	1948–1950
Secretary of Finance	Miguel Cuaderno, Sr.	1948–1949
Secretary of Finance	Jaime Hernandez	1949–1952
Secretary of Finance	Aurelio Montinola Sr.	1952–1953
Secretary of Justice	Roman Ozaeta	1948
Secretary of Justice	Sabino B. Padilla	1948–1949
Secretary of Justice	Ricardo L. Nepomuceno	1949–1950
Secretary of Justice	Cesar Bengzon	1950–1951
Secretary of Justice	Oscar Castelo	1951–1953
Secretary of Justice	Roberto Gianzon	1953
Secretary of Agriculture and Natural Resources	Placido Mapa	1948–1950
Secretary of Agriculture and Natural Resources	Fernando Lopez	1950–1953
Secretary of Public Works and Communications	Ricardo L. Nepumoceno	1948–1949
Secretary of Public Works and Communications	Prospero Sanidad	1949–1951
Secretary of Public Works and Communications	Sotero Baluyut	1951–1952
Secretary of Public Works and Communications	Pablo Lorenzo	1952–1953
Secretary of Education	Manuel Gallego	1948
Secretary of Education	Prudencio Langcauon	1948–1950
Secretary of Education	Pablo Lorenzo	1950–1951
Secretary of Education	Teodoro Evangelista	1951
Secretary of Education	Cecilio Putong	1952–1953
Secretary of Labor	Primitivo Lovina	1948–1950
Secretary of Labor	Jose Figueras	1950–1953
Secretary of National Defense	Teodosio R. Diño	1948–1950
Secretary of National Defense	Ruperto Kangleon	1948–1950
Secretary of National Defense	Ramon Magsaysay	1950–1953
Secretary of National Defense	Oscar Castelo	1953
Secretary of Health and Public Welfare	Antonio Villarama	1949–1953
Secretary of Commerce and Industry	Cornelio Balmaceda	1949–1953
Executive Secretary	Teodoro Evangelista	1948–1953
Commissioner of Budget	Pio Joven	1948–1953
Secretary of Social Welfare	Asuncion A. Perez	1948–1953
Solicitor General	Felix Angelo Bautista	1948–1950
Solicitor General	Pompeyo Diaz	1950–1952
Solicitor General	Juan R. Liwag	1952–1954
Governor of the Central Bank of the Philippines	Miguel Cuaderno Sr.	1949–1960

== Ramon Magsaysay (1953–1957) ==
Office	Name	Term
President	Ramon Magsaysay	December 30, 1953 – March 17, 1957
Vice-President	Carlos P. Garcia	December 30, 1953 – March 18, 1957
Secretary of Agriculture and Natural Resources	Salvador Araneta	March 10, 1954 – August 13, 1955
Secretary of Agriculture and Natural Resources	Juan Rodriguez	August 18, 1955 – March 18, 1957
Secretary of Education, Culture and Sports	Cecilo Putong	December 30, 1953 – January 13, 1954
Secretary of Education, Culture and Sports	Justice Pastor Endencia	January 13, 1954 – June 30, 1954
Secretary of Education, Culture and Sports	Gregorio Hernández Jr.	July 1, 1954 – March 18, 1957
Secretary of Foreign Affairs	Carlos P. Garcia	March 10, 1954 – March 18, 1957
Secretary of Finance	Jaime Hernández	March 10, 1954 – May 27, 1956
Secretary of Justice	Pedro Tuazon	March 10, 1954 – March 18, 1957
Secretary of Labor	Eleuterio Adevoso	March 10, 1954 – April 21, 1954
Secretary of Labor	Ángel Castano	August 22, 1954 – March 18, 1957
Secretary of National Defense	Ramon Magsaysay (in concurrent capacity as President)	January 1, 1954 – May 14, 1954
Secretary of National Defense	Sotero Cabahug	April 4, 1954 – January 2, 1956
Secretary of National Defense	Eulogio Balao	January 3, 1956 – March 18, 1957
Secretary of Commerce and Industry	Óscar Ledesma	March 10, 1954 – March 18, 1957
Secretary of Public Works, Transportation and Communications	Vicente Ylagan Orosa Sr.	March 10, 1954 – 1955
Secretary of Public Works, Transportation and Communications	Florencio Moreno	April 30, 1955 – March 18, 1957
Administrator of Social Services and Development	Pacita Madrigal-Warns	1954–1955
Executive Secretary	Fred Ruiz Castro	December 30, 1953 – October 26, 1955
Executive Secretary	Fortunato de León	April 12, 1956 – March 7, 1957
Press Secretary	J.V. Cruz	January 6, 1956 – March 18, 1957
Solicitor General	Juan R. Liwag	November 10, 1952 – February 9, 1954
Solicitor General	Querube C. Makalintal	February 9, 1954 – August 31, 1954
Solicitor General	Ambrosio B. Padilla	September 1, 1954 – December 30, 1957
Governor of the Central Bank of the Philippines	Miguel Cuaderno Sr.	1949–1960

== Carlos P. Garcia (1957–1961) ==
Office	Name	Term
President	Carlos P. Garcia	March 17, 1957 – December 30, 1961
Vice-President	Diosdado Macapagal	December 30, 1957 – December 30, 1961
Secretary of Agriculture and Natural Resources	Juan Rodríguez	March 18, 1957 – March 3, 1960
Secretary of Agriculture and Natural Resources	César Fortich	March 3, 1960 – December 30, 1961
Secretary of Education, Culture and Sports	Martín Aguilar Jr.	March 29, 1957 – September 2, 1957
Secretary of Education, Culture and Sports	Manuel Lim	September 3, 1957 – November 17, 1957
Secretary of Education, Culture and Sports	Daniel Salcedo	November 18, 1957 – May 31, 1959
Secretary of Education, Culture and Sports	José E. Romero	June 1, 1959 – September 1961
Secretary of Education, Culture and Sports	Jose Y. Tuason (Acting)	September 1961 – December 1961
Secretary of Finance	Jaime Hernández	March 18, 1957 – January 24, 1960
Secretary of Finance	Dominador Aytona	January 24, 1960 – December 29, 1961
Secretary of Foreign Affairs	Carlos P. Garcia (in concurrent capacity as President)	March 18, 1957 – August 22, 1957
Secretary of Foreign Affairs	Felixberto Serrano	August 22, 1957 – December 30, 1961
Secretary of General Services	Alejandro Almendras	1957 – December 1959
Secretary of General Services	Serafin N. Salvador (Acting)	January 1960 – September 1961
Secretary of General Services	Arsenio Lugay (Acting)	October 2, 1961 – December 1961
Secretary of Health	Paulino J. Garcia	March 18, 1957 – July 15, 1958
Secretary of Health	Elpídio Valencia	July 15, 1958 – December 30, 1961
Secretary of Justice	Pedro Tuazon	March 18, 1957 – March 1958
Secretary of Justice	Jesús Barrera	April 1958 – June 1959
Secretary of Justice	Enrique Fernández	June 1959 – July 1959
Secretary of Justice	Alejo Mabanag	May 18, 1959 – December 1961
Secretary of Labor	Ángel Castaño	March 18, 1957 – September 1961
Secretary of Labor	Agapito Braganza (Acting)	September 1961 – December 1961
Secretary of National Defense	Eulogio Bálao	March 17, 1957 – August 28, 1957
Secretary of National Defense	Jesús Vargas	August 28, 1957 – May 18, 1959
Secretary of National Defense	Alejo Santos	May 18, 1959 – December 30, 1961
Secretary of Commerce and Industry	Pedro Hernáez	April 10, 1959 – January 24, 1960
Secretary of Commerce and Industry	Manuel Lim	January 24, 1960 – December 30, 1961
Secretary of Public Works, Transportation and Communications	Florencio Moreno	March 18, 1957 – 1961
Secretary of Public Works, Transportation and Communications	Marciano D. Bautista (Acting)	October 1961 – December 1961
Administrator of Social Services and Development	Amparo Villamor	1960–1961
Executive Secretary	Fortunato de León	March 18, 1957 – December 30, 1957
Executive Secretary	Juan Pajo	January 16, 1958 – August 28, 1959
Executive Secretary	Natalio P. Castillo	January 24, 1960 – September 5, 1961
Executive Secretary	José María Rocha (Acting)	September 5, 1961 – December 1961
Solicitor General	Guillermo E. Torres	December 30, 1957 – June 30, 1958
Solicitor General	Edilberto Barot	July 1, 1958 – June 30, 1961
Governor of the Central Bank of the Philippines	Miguel Cuaderno Sr.	1949–1960

== Diosdado Macapagal (1961–1965) ==
Office	Name	Term
President	Diosdado Macapagal	December 30, 1961 – December 30, 1965
Vice-President	Emmanuel Pelaez	December 30, 1961 – December 30, 1965
Secretary of Agriculture and Natural Resources	Benjamin Gozon	1962–1963
Secretary of Agriculture and Natural Resources	José Feliciano	September 16, 1963–1965
Commissioner of Budget	Faustino Sy-Changco	February 15, 1960 – December 30, 1965
Secretary of Education, Culture and Sports	José E. Romero	December 30, 1961 – September 4, 1962
Secretary of Education, Culture and Sports	José Tuason	September 5, 1962 – December 30, 1962
Secretary of Education, Culture and Sports	Alejandro Roces	December 31, 1962 – September 7, 1965
Secretary of Finance	Fernando E. V. Sison	January 2, 1962 – July 31, 1962
Secretary of Finance	Rodrigo D. Pérez Jr.	August 1, 1962 – January 7, 1964
Secretary of Finance	Rufino G. Hechanova	January 8, 1964 – December 13, 1965
Secretary of Foreign Affairs	Emmanuel Pelaez	December 30, 1961 – July 1963
Secretary of Foreign Affairs	Salvador P. Lopez	July 1963 – May 9, 1964
Secretary of Foreign Affairs	Mauro Mendez	May 9, 1964 – December 30, 1965
Secretary of General Services	Duma Sinsuat	January 1962 – December 1965
Secretary of Health	Francisco Duque Jr.	January 1962 – July 22, 1963
Secretary of Health	Floro Dabu	July 23, 1963 – March 6, 1964
Secretary of Health	Rodolfo Canos	May 1, 1964 – June 20, 1964
Secretary of Health	Manuel Cuenco	December 13, 1964 – December 29, 1965
Secretary of Justice	Jose W. Diokno	January 1962 – May 1962
Secretary of Justice	Juan R. Liwag	May 1962 – July 1963
Secretary of Justice	Salvador Mariño	July 1963 – December 1965
Secretary of Labor	Norberto Romualdez Jr.	December 30, 1961 – November 29, 1962
Secretary of Labor	Bernardino R. Abes	November 29, 1962 – July 15, 1964
Secretary of Labor	Jose B. Lingad	July 15, 1964 – December 30, 1965
Secretary of National Defense	Macario Peralta Jr.	December 30, 1961 – December 30, 1965
Secretary of Commerce and Industry	Manuel Lim	1961–1962
Secretary of Commerce and Industry	Rufino Hechanova	1962–1963
Secretary of Commerce and Industry	Cornelio Balmaceda	1963–1965
Secretary of Public Works, Transportation and Communications	Marciano Bautista	1961–1962
Secretary of Public Works, Transportation and Communications	Paulino Cases	1962
Secretary of Public Works, Transportation and Communications	Brigido Valencia	1962–1963
Secretary of Public Works, Transportation and Communications	Jorge Abad	1963–1965
Secretary of Agrarian Reform	Sixto K. Roxas III	1963
Secretary of Agrarian Reform	Claudette Caliguiran	1963–1964
Secretary of Agrarian Reform	Benjamin Gozon	1964–1965
Solicitor General	Arturo A. Alafriz	1961–1966
Governor of the Central Bank of the Philippines	Andres Castillo	1961–1967

== Ferdinand Marcos (1965–1986) ==
=== First and second terms in the Third Republic (1965–1972) ===
Office	Name	Term
President	Ferdinand Marcos Sr.	December 30, 1965 – 1978
Vice-President	Fernando Lopez	December 30, 1965 – September 23, 1972
Secretary of Agriculture and Natural Resources	Fernando Lopez	1965–1971
Secretary of Agriculture and Natural Resources	Arturo Tanco Jr.	1971–1978
Secretary of Education	Carlos P. Romulo	1965–1967
Secretary of Education	Onofre Corpuz	1967–1971
Secretary of Education	Juan Manuel	1971–1972
Secretary of Education and Culture	Juan Manuel	1972–1978
Secretary of Foreign Affairs	Narciso Ramos	1965–1968
Secretary of Foreign Affairs	Carlos P. Romulo	1968–1978
Secretary of Finance	Eduardo Romualdez	1966–1970
Secretary of Finance	Cesar Virata	1970–1978
Secretary of General Services	Vicente Duterte	December 30, 1965 – February 21, 1968
Secretary of General Services	Salih Ututalum	February 1968 – December 1969
Secretary of General Services	Constancio Castañeda	February 8, 1970 – 1980s
Secretary of Justice	Jose Yulo	1965–1967
Secretary of Justice	Claudio Teehankee	1967–1968
Secretary of Justice	Juan Ponce Enrile	1968–1970
Secretary of Justice	Felix Makasiar	1970
Secretary of Justice	Vicente Abad Santos	1970–1978
Secretary of Labor	Emilio Espinosa Jr.	1965–1967
Secretary of Labor	Blas Ople	1967–1971
Secretary of Labor	Adrian Cristobal	1971–1972
Secretary of Labor	Blas Ople	1972–1978
Secretary of National Defense	Ferdinand E. Marcos (in concurrent capacity as President)	1965–1967
Secretary of National Defense	Ernesto Mata	1967–1970
Secretary of National Defense	Juan Ponce Enrile	1970–1971
Secretary of National Defense	Ferdinand E. Marcos (in concurrent capacity as President)	1971–1972
Secretary of National Defense	Juan Ponce Enrile	1972–1978
Secretary of Commerce and Industry	Marcelo Balatbat	1966–1968
Secretary of Commerce and Industry	Leonides Sarao Virata	1969–1970
Secretary of Commerce and Industry	Ernesto Maceda	1970–1971
Secretary of Commerce and Industry	Troadio Quiazon	1971–1974
Executive Secretary	Rafael M. Salas	January 1, 1966 – July 24, 1969
Executive Secretary	Ernesto Maceda	July 26, 1969 – February 7, 1970
Executive Secretary	Alejandro Melchor Jr.	February 9, 1970 – November 4, 1974
Executive Secretary	Ponciano Mathay	November 7, 1974 – December 7, 1975
Secretary of Industry	Vicente Paterno	1974–1978
Secretary of Public Works, Transportation and Communications	Antonio Raquiza	1966–1968
Secretary of Public Works, Transportation and Communications	Rene Espina	1968–1969
Secretary of Public Works, Transportation and Communications	Antonio Syquio	1969–1970
Secretary of Public Works, Transportation and Communications	David Consunji	1970–1975
Secretary of Public Works, Transportation and Communications	Alfredo Juinio	1975–1978
Secretary of Public Highways	Baltazar Aquino	1974–1978
Secretary of Social Welfare	Francisco Remotigue	1966–1967
Secretary of Social Welfare	Gregorio Feliciano	1967–1971
Secretary of Social Welfare	Estefania Aldaba-Lim	1971–1976
Secretary of Social Services and Development	Estefania Aldaba-Lim	1976–1977
Secretary of Social Services and Development	Nathaniel Tablante	1977–1978
Director-General of the National Economic and Development Authority	Gerardo Sicat (in concurrent capacity as Secretary of Socio-economic Planning)	1973–1978
Solicitor General	Antonio P. Barredo	1966–1968
Solicitor General	Felix V. Makasiar	1968–1970
Solicitor General	Felix Q. Antonio	1970–1972
Governor of the Central Bank of the Philippines	Alfonso Calalang	1968–1970

=== Martial law period until 1986 ===
Office	Name	Term
President	Ferdinand Marcos Sr.	1978–1986
Prime Minister	Ferdinand Marcos Sr.	1978–1981
Prime Minister	Cesar Virata	1981–1986
Minister of Agriculture	Arturo Tanco Jr.	1978–1984
Minister of Agriculture	Salvador Escudero III	1984–1986
Minister of Education and Culture	Juan Manuel	1978–1979
Minister of Education and Culture	Onofre Corpuz	1979–1982
Minister of Education, Culture and Sports	Onofre Corpuz	1982–1984
Minister of Education, Culture and Sports	Jaime Laya	1984–1986
Minister of Foreign Affairs	Carlos P. Romulo	1978–1984
Minister of Foreign Affairs	Manuel Collantes	1984
Minister of Foreign Affairs	Arturo Tolentino	1984–1985
Minister of Foreign Affairs	Pacifico Castro	1985–1986
Minister of Finance	Cesar Virata	1978–1986
Minister of Justice	Vicente Abad Santos	1978–1979
Minister of Justice	Catalino Macaraig Jr.	1979
Minister of Justice	Ricardo Puno	1979–1984
Minister of Justice	Estelito Mendoza	1984–1986
Minister of National Defense	Juan Ponce Enrile	1978–1986
Minister of Social Services and Development	Sylvia Montes	1978–1986
Minister of Industry	Vicente Paterno	1978–1979
Minister of Industry	Roberto Ongpin	1979–1981
Minister of Trade	Luis Villafuerte	1979–1981
Minister of Trade and Industry	Roberto Ongpin	1981–1986
Minister of Public Works, Transportation and Communications	Alfredo Juinio	1978–1981
Minister of Public Highways	Baltazar Aquino	1978–1979
Minister of Public Highways	Vicente Paterno	1979–1980
Minister of Public Highways	Jesus Hipolito	1980–1981
Minister of Public Works and Highways	Jesus Hipolito	1981–1986
Director-General of the National Economic and Development Authority	Gerardo Sicat (in concurrent capacity as Minister of Socio-economic Planning)	1978–1981
Director-General of the National Economic and Development Authority	Cesar Virata (in concurrent capacity as Minister of Socio-economic Planning)	1981–1986
Solicitor General	Estelito P. Mendoza	1972–1986
Minister of Energy	Geronimo Velasco	1978–1986
Minister of Human Settlements	Imelda Marcos	1978–1986
Minister of Labor	Blas Ople	1978–1986
Governor of the Central Bank of the Philippines	Gregorio Licaros	1970–1981
Governor of the Central Bank of the Philippines	Jaime C. Laya	1981–1984
Governor of the Central Bank of the Philippines	Jose B. Fernandez Jr.	1984–1990

== Corazon Aquino (1986–1992) ==
=== Ministerial Cabinet (1986) ===
Office	Name	Term
President	Maria Corazon S. Cojuangco-Aquino	February 25, 1986 – March 25, 1986
Vice-President	Salvador Laurel	February 25, 1986 – March 25, 1986
Prime Minister	Salvador Laurel	February 25, 1986 – March 25, 1986
Presidential Executive Assistant	Joker Arroyo	February 25, 1986 – March 25, 1986
Minister of Agrarian Reform	Conrado F. Estrella	February 25, 1986 – March 25, 1986
Minister of Agriculture and Food	Ramon Mitra, Jr.	February 25, 1986 – March 25, 1986
Minister of Budget and Management	Alberto Romulo	February 26, 1986 – March 25, 1986
Director-General of the National Economic and Development Authority	Solita Monsod (in concurrent capacity as Minister of Socio-economic Planning)	February 25, 1986 – March 25, 1986
Minister of Education, Culture and Sports	Lourdes Quisumbing	February 25, 1986 – March 25, 1986
Minister of Finance	Jaime Ongpin	February 25, 1986 – March 25, 1986
Minister of Foreign Affairs	Salvador Laurel	February 25, 1986 – March 25, 1986
Minister of Health	Alfredo Bengzon	February 25, 1986 – March 25, 1986
Minister of Local Government and Community Development	Aquilino Pimentel, Jr.	February 25, 1986 – March 25, 1986
Minister of Justice	Estelito Mendoza	February 25, 1986 – February 28, 1986
Minister of Justice	Neptali Gonzales	March 1, 1986 – March 25, 1986
Minister of Labor and Employment	Augusto Sanchez	February 25, 1986 – March 25, 1986
Minister of National Defense	Juan Ponce Enrile	February 25, 1986 – March 25, 1986
Minister of Natural Resources	Ernesto Maceda	February 25, 1986 – March 25, 1986
Minister of Public Works and Highways	Rogaciano M. Mercado	February 25, 1986 – March 25, 1986
Minister of Tourism	Jose Antonio Gonzales	February 25, 1986 – March 25, 1986
Minister of Trade and Industry	Jose Concepcion Jr.	February 25, 1986 – March 25, 1986
Minister of Transportation and Communications	Hernando Perez	February 25, 1986 – March 25, 1986
Minister of General Services	Victor Ziga	February 25, 1986 – March 25, 1986
Minister for Human Rights	Jose Diokno	
Minister for Good Government	Jovito Salonga	
Presidential Spokesperson	Rene Saguisag	February 25, 1986 – March 8, 1987
Solicitor General	Sedfrey A. Ordoñez	February 25, 1986 – March 4, 1987
Governor of the Central Bank of the Philippines	Jose B. Fernandez Jr.	January 19, 1984 – February 19, 1990

=== Presidential Cabinet (1986–1992) ===
The parliamentary system government was replaced by a presidential system government that was created by the 1986 provisional Freedom Constitution. The cabinet largely remained the same upon the official ratification and enactment of the 1987 constitution on February 2, 1987.

Office	Name	Term
President	Corazon Cojuangco-Aquino	March 25, 1986 – June 30, 1992
Vice-President	Salvador Laurel	March 25, 1986 – June 30, 1992
Executive Secretary	Joker Arroyo	March 25, 1986 – September 15, 1987
Executive Secretary	Catalino Macaraig, Jr.	September 17, 1987 – December 14, 1990
Executive Secretary	Oscar Orbos	December 16, 1990 – July 7, 1991
Executive Secretary	Magdangal Elma	July 8, 1991 – July 14, 1991
Executive Secretary	Franklin Drilon	July 15, 1991 – June 30, 1992
Secretary of Agrarian Reform	Conrado Estrella, Sr.	March 25, 1986 – April 30, 1986
Secretary of Agrarian Reform	Heherson Alvarez	May 1, 1986 – March 7, 1987
Secretary of Agrarian Reform	Philip Juico	July 23, 1987 – July 1, 1989
Secretary of Agrarian Reform	Miriam Defensor Santiago	July 20, 1989 – January 4, 1990
Secretary of Agrarian Reform	Florencio Abad	January 4, 1990 – April 5, 1990
Secretary of Agrarian Reform	Benjamin Leong	April 6, 1990 – June 30, 1992
Secretary of Agriculture	Ramon Mitra, Jr.	March 25, 1986 – June 30, 1987
Secretary of Agriculture	Carlos Dominguez III	June 30, 1987 – December 31, 1989
Secretary of Agriculture	Senen Bacani	January 1, 1990 – June 30, 1992
Secretary of Budget and Management	Alberto Romulo	March 25, 1986 – March 13, 1987
Secretary of Budget and Management	Guillermo Carague	March 13, 1987 – February 12, 1992
Secretary of Budget and Management	Salvador Enriquez Jr.	February 12, 1992 – June 30, 1992
Secretary of Education, Culture and Sports	Lourdes Quisimbing	March 25, 1986 – January 3, 1990
Secretary of Education, Culture and Sports	Isidro Cariño	January 3, 1990 – June 30, 1992
Secretary of Environment and Natural Resources	Ernesto Maceda	March 25, 1986 – December 1, 1986
Secretary of Environment and Natural Resources	Carlos Dominguez III	December 2, 1986 – March 9, 1987
Secretary of Environment and Natural Resources	Fulgencio S. Factoran	March 10, 1987 – June 30, 1992
Secretary of Finance	Jaime Ongpin	March 25, 1986 – September 14, 1987
Secretary of Finance	Vicente Jayme	September 15, 1987 – December 31, 1989
Secretary of Finance	Jesus Estanislao	January 1, 1990 – June 30, 1992
Secretary of Foreign Affairs	Salvador Laurel	March 25, 1986 – February 2, 1987
Secretary of Foreign Affairs	Manuel Yan	February 2, 1987 – September 14, 1987
Secretary of Foreign Affairs	Raul Manglapus	September 15, 1987 – June 30, 1992
Secretary of Health	Alfredo Bengzon	March 25, 1986 – February 7, 1992
Secretary of Health	Antonio O. Periquet	February 10, 1992 – June 30, 1992
Minister of Local Government	Aquilino Pimentel, Jr.	March 25, 1986 – December 7, 1986
Minister of Local Government	Jaime Ferrer	December 8, 1986 – August 2, 1987
Secretary of Local Government	Lito Monico C. Lorenzana	August 3, 1987 – November 8, 1987
Secretary of Local Government	Luis T. Santos	November 9, 1987 – December 10, 1991
Secretary of the Interior and Local Government	Cesar N. Sarino	December 11, 1991 – June 30, 1992
Secretary of Justice	Neptali Gonzales	March 25, 1986 – March 1987
Secretary of Justice	Sedfrey Ordoñez	March 1987 – January 1990
Secretary of Justice	Franklin Drilon	January 4, 1990 – July 14, 1991
Secretary of Justice	Silvestre Bello III	July 1991 – February 7, 1992
Secretary of Justice	Eduardo Montenegro	February 10, 1992 – June 30, 1992
Secretary of Labor and Employment	Augusto Sanchez	March 25, 1986 – January 4, 1987
Secretary of Labor and Employment	Franklin Drilon	January 5, 1987 – January 2, 1990
Secretary of Labor and Employment	Dionisio dela Serna	January 3, 1990 – January 19, 1990
Secretary of Labor and Employment	Ruben Torres	January 20, 1990 – February 11, 1992
Secretary of Labor and Employment	Nieves Confesor	February 12, 1992 – June 30, 1992
Secretary of National Defense	Juan Ponce Enrile	March 25, 1986 – November 23, 1986
Secretary of National Defense	Rafael Ileto	November 23, 1986 – January 21, 1988
Secretary of National Defense	Fidel Ramos	January 22, 1988 – July 18, 1991
Secretary of National Defense	Renato de Villa	July 20, 1991 – June 30, 1992
Secretary of Public Works and Highways	Rogaciano M. Mercado	March 25, 1986 – November 20, 1986
Secretary of Public Works and Highways	Vicente Jayme	December 2, 1986 – September 1, 1987
Secretary of Public Works and Highways	Fiorello Estuar	September 21, 1987 – October 26, 1987
Secretary of Public Works and Highways	Juanito Ferrer	October 27, 1987 – November 4, 1988
Secretary of Public Works and Highways	Fiorello Estuar	November 5, 1988 – December 31, 1990
Secretary of Public Works and Highways	Jose de Jesus	January 4, 1991– June 30, 1992
Secretary of Social Welfare and Development	Mita Pardo de Tavera	1986 – 1992
Secretary of Tourism	Jose Antonio Gonzales	March 25, 1986 – April 14, 1989
Secretary of Tourism	Narzalina Lim	April 14, 1989 – June 7, 1989 (in acting capacity)
Secretary of Tourism	Peter Garrucho	June 8, 1989 – January 8, 1991
Secretary of Tourism	Rafael Alunan III	January 9, 1991 – February 16, 1992
Secretary of Tourism	Narzalina Lim	February 17, 1992 – June 30, 1992
Secretary of Trade and Industry	Jose Concepcion Jr.	March 25, 1986 – January 8, 1991
Secretary of Trade and Industry	Peter Garrucho	January 9, 1991 – February 12, 1992
Secretary of Trade and Industry	Lilia Bautista	February 19, 1992 – June 30, 1992
Secretary of Transportation and Communications	Hernando Perez	March 25, 1986 – March 16, 1987
Secretary of Transportation and Communications	Rainerio Reyes	March 16, 1987 – January 3, 1990
Secretary of Transportation and Communications	Oscar Orbos	January 3, 1990 – December 9, 1990
Secretary of Transportation and Communications	Arturo Corona	December 20, 1990 – May 16, 1991
Secretary of Transportation and Communications	Pete Nicomedes Prado	March 23, 1991 – June 30, 1992
Director-General of the National Economic and Development Authority	Solita Monsod (in concurrent capacity as Secretary of Socio-economic Planning)	March 7, 1986 – June 28, 1989
Director-General of the National Economic and Development Authority	Filologo Pante (in concurrent capacity as Secretary of Socio-economic Planning)	June 28, 1989 – August 9, 1989
Director-General of the National Economic and Development Authority	Florian Alburo (in concurrent capacity as Secretary of Socio-economic Planning)	August 9, 1989 – September 20, 1989
Director-General of the National Economic and Development Authority	Jesus Estanislao (in concurrent capacity as Secretary of Socio-economic Planning)	September 20, 1989 – January 3, 1990
Director-General of the National Economic and Development Authority	Cayetano Paderanga, Jr. (in concurrent capacity as Secretary of Socio-economic Planning)	January 3, 1990 – June 30, 1992
Secretary of Science and Technology	Antonio Arizabal	June 7, 1986 – April 6, 1990
Secretary of Science and Technology	Ceferino Follosco	April 6, 1990 – June 30, 1992
Cabinet Secretary	Fulgencio Factoran Jr.	December 22, 1986 – March 8, 1987
Cabinet Secretary	Jose de Jesus	March 19, 1987 – January 4, 1990
Cabinet Secretary	Aniceto Sobrepeña	January 5, 1990 – July 19, 1991
Press Secretary	Teodoro Benigno	September 6, 1986 – June 14, 1989
Press Secretary	Adolfo Azcuna	June 16, 1989 – December 31, 1989
Press Secretary	Tomas Gomez III	January 4, 1990 – February 11, 1992
Press Secretary	Horacio Paredes	February 12, 1992 – June 30, 1992
Presidential Spokesperson	Teodoro Benigno	March 8, 1987 – January 1, 1990
Presidential Spokesperson	Adolfo Azcuna	January 1, 1990 – March 18, 1991
Presidential Spokesperson	Tomas Gomez III	March 18, 1991 – June 30, 1992
Solicitor General	Frank C. Chavez	March 5, 1987 – February 5, 1992
Solicitor General	Ramon S. Desuasido	February 6, 1992 – July 5, 1992
Governor of the Central Bank of the Philippines	Jose B. Fernandez Jr.	January 19, 1984 – February 19, 1990
Governor of the Central Bank of the Philippines	Jose L. Cuisia Jr.	February 20, 1990 – July 2, 1993

== Fidel V. Ramos (1992–1998) ==
Office	Name	Term
President	Fidel V. Ramos	June 30, 1992 – June 30, 1998
Vice-President	Joseph Ejercito Estrada	June 30, 1992 – June 30, 1998
Executive Secretary	Peter Garrucho	July 1, 1992 – September 13, 1992
Executive Secretary	Edelmiro Amante	September 14, 1992 – June 30, 1993
Executive Secretary	Teofisto Guingona, Jr.	July 6, 1993 – May 19, 1995
Executive Secretary	Ruben Torres	May 20, 1995 – January 8, 1998
Executive Secretary	Alexander Aguirre	January 9, 1998 – June 30, 1998
Secretary of Agrarian Reform	Ernesto Garilao	July 1, 1992 – June 30, 1998
Secretary of Agriculture	Roberto Sebastian	July 1, 1992 – January 31, 1996
Secretary of Agriculture	Salvador Escudero III	February 1, 1996 – June 30, 1998
Secretary of Budget and Management	Salvador Enriquez Jr.	June 30, 1992 – February 1, 1998
Secretary of Budget and Management	Emilia Boncodin	February 1, 1998 – June 30, 1998
Secretary of Education, Culture and Sports	Armand Fabella	July 1, 1992 – July 6, 1994
Secretary of Education, Culture and Sports	Ricardo Gloria	July 7, 1994 – December 1997
Secretary of Education, Culture and Sports	Erlinda Pefianco	February 2, 1998 – June 30, 1998
Secretary of Energy	Rufino Bomasang	June 30, 1992 – January 11, 1993
Secretary of Energy	Delfin Lazaro	January 12, 1993 – September 19, 1994
Secretary of Energy	Francisco Viray	September 20, 1994 – June 30, 1998
Secretary of Environment and Natural Resources	Ricardo M. Umali (Acting)	July 1, 1992 – August 31, 1992
Secretary of Environment and Natural Resources	Angel Alcala	September 8, 1992 – June 30, 1995
Secretary of Environment and Natural Resources	Victor Ramos	July 1, 1995 – June 30, 1998
Secretary of Finance	Ramon del Rosario Jr.	July 1, 1992 – June 1, 1993
Secretary of Finance	Ernest Leung	June 2, 1993 – January 31, 1994
Secretary of Finance	Roberto de Ocampo	February 1, 1994 – March 30, 1998
Secretary of Finance	Salvador Enriquez	April 1, 1998 – June 30, 1998
Secretary of Foreign Affairs	Roberto Romulo	July 1, 1992 – April 1995
Secretary of Foreign Affairs	Domingo Siazon, Jr.	May 1995 – June 30, 1998
Secretary of Health	Juan Flavier	July 1, 1992 – January 30, 1995
Secretary of Health	Jaime Galvez Tan	January 30, 1995 – July 5, 1995
Secretary of Health	Hilarion Ramiro Jr.	July 10, 1995 – March 22, 1996
Secretary of Health	Carmencita Reodica	April 8, 1996 – June 29, 1998
Secretary of the Interior and Local Government	Rafael Alunan III	July 1, 1992 – April 15, 1996
Secretary of the Interior and Local Government	Robert Barbers	April 16, 1996 – February 3, 1998
Secretary of the Interior and Local Government	Epimaco Velasco	February 4, 1998 – May 30, 1998
Secretary of the Interior and Local Government	Nelson Collantes	June 1, 1998 – June 30, 1998
Secretary of Justice	Franklin Drilon	July 1, 1992 – February 1995
Secretary of Justice	Demetrio Demetria	February 1995 – May 1995
Secretary of Justice	Teofisto Guingona Jr.	May 1995 – February 1998
Secretary of Justice	Silvestre Bello III	February 1998 – June 30, 1998
Secretary of Labor and Employment	Nieves Confesor	June 30, 1992 – June 30, 1995
Secretary of Labor and Employment	Jose Brillantes	July 1, 1995 – January 16, 1996
Secretary of Labor and Employment	Leonardo Quisumbing	January 16, 1996 – January 26, 1998
Secretary of Labor and Employment	Cresenciano Trajano	January 26, 1998 – June 30, 1998
Secretary of National Defense	Renato de Villa	June 30, 1992 – September 15, 1997
Secretary of National Defense	Fortunato Abat	September 16, 1997 – June 30, 1998
Secretary of Public Works and Highways	Jose de Jesus	June 30, 1992 – March 1, 1993
Secretary of Public Works and Highways	Eduardo Mir	March 1, 1993 – June 1, 1993
Secretary of Public Works and Highways	Gregorio Vigilar	June 1, 1993 – June 30, 1998
Secretary of Science and Technology	Ricardo Gloria	July 1, 1992 – July 6, 1994
Secretary of Science and Technology	William Padolina	July 7, 1994 – June 30, 1998
Secretary of Social Welfare and Development	Corazon Alma de Leon	July 1, 1992 – June 1995
Secretary of Social Welfare and Development	Lilian Laigo	1995 – June 30, 1998
Secretary of Tourism	Narzalina Lim	June 30, 1992 – September 10, 1992
Secretary of Tourism	Vicente Carlos	September 11, 1992 – July 3, 1995
Secretary of Tourism	Eduardo Pilapil	July 4, 1995 – March 29, 1996
Secretary of Tourism	Evelyn Pantig	March 29, 1996 – April 7, 1996
Secretary of Tourism	Guillermina Gabor	April 8, 1996 – June 30, 1998
Secretary of Trade and Industry	Rizalino Navarro	July 1, 1992 – 1996
Secretary of Trade and Industry	Cesar Bautista	1996 – June 30, 1998
Secretary of Transportation and Communications	Jesus Garcia	July 1, 1992 – April 1, 1996
Secretary of Transportation and Communications	Amado Lagdameo Jr.	April 1, 1996 – April 16, 1997
Secretary of Transportation and Communications	Arturo Enrile	April 16, 1997 – January 14, 1998
Secretary of Transportation and Communications	Josefina Lichauco	January 15, 1998 – June 30, 1998
Presidential Spokesperson	Rodolfo Reyes	July 1, 1992 – May 10, 1993
Presidential Spokesperson	Jesus Sison	May 11, 1993 – June 20, 1995
Presidential Spokesperson	Hector Villanueva	June 21, 1995 – June 29, 1998
Chief of the Presidential Management Staff	Ma. Leonora Vasquez-de Jesus, Ph.D.	1992–1998
Cabinet Secretary	Ma. Leonora Vasquez-de Jesus, Ph.D.	1992–1998
Director-General of the National Economic and Development Authority	Cielito Habito (in concurrent capacity as Secretary of Socio-economic Planning)	July 1, 1992 – June 30, 1998
Chairperson of the Commission on Higher Education	Ricardo Gloria	May 18, 1994 – June 30, 1995
Chairperson of the Commission on Higher Education	Angel Alcala	July 1, 1995 – June 30, 1998
Solicitor General	Ramon Desuasido	June 30, 1992 – July 5, 1992
Solicitor General	Eduardo Montenegro	July 6, 1992 – August 10, 1992
Solicitor General	Raul Goco	August 11, 1992 – September 22, 1996
Solicitor General	Silvestre Bello III	September 23, 1996 – February 3, 1998
Solicitor General	Romeo de la Cruz	February 4, 1998 – June 8, 1998
Solicitor General	Silvestre Bello III	June 9, 1998 – June 30, 1998
Chairman of the Metropolitan Manila Authority	Ismael Mathay Jr.	July 1, 1992 – 1994
Chairman of the Metropolitan Manila Authority	Prospero Oreta	1994 – March 1, 1995
Chairman of the Metropolitan Manila Development Authority	Prospero Oreta	March 1, 1995 – June 30, 1998
National Security Adviser	Jose Almonte	July 1, 1992 – June 30, 1998
Presidential Adviser on the Peace Process	Haydee Yorac	July 1, 1992 – August 9, 1993
Presidential Adviser on the Peace Process	Oscar Santos	August 20, 1993 – March 22, 1994
Presidential Adviser on the Peace Process	Manuel Yan	March 22, 1994 – June 30, 1998
Chairman and Administrator of the Subic Bay Metropolitan Authority	Richard J. Gordon	July 1, 1992 – June 30, 1998
Chairman of the National Centennial Commission	Salvador H. Laurel	1993–1998
Governor of the Bangko Sentral ng Pilipinas	Jose L. Cuisia Jr.	February 20, 1990 – July 2, 1993
Governor of the Bangko Sentral ng Pilipinas	Gabriel Singson	July 6, 1993 – July 5, 1999

== Joseph Ejercito Estrada (1998–2001) ==
Office	Name	Term
President	Joseph Ejercito Estrada	June 30, 1998 – January 20, 2001
Vice-President	Gloria Macapagal Arroyo	June 30, 1998 – January 20, 2001
Executive Secretary	Ronaldo Zamora	July 1, 1998 – December 31, 2000
Executive Secretary	Edgardo Angara	January 6, 2001 – January 20, 2001
Secretary of Agrarian Reform	Horacio Morales Jr.	July 1, 1998 – January 20, 2001
Secretary of Agriculture	William Dar	July 1, 1998 – May 24, 1999
Secretary of Agriculture	Edgardo Angara	May 25, 1999 – January 6, 2001
Secretary of Agriculture	Domingo F. Panganiban	January 8, 2001 – January 20, 2001
Secretary of Budget and Management	Benjamin Diokno	July 1, 1998 – January 20, 2001
Secretary of Education, Culture and Sports	Andrew Gonzalez	July 1, 1998 – January 20, 2001
Secretary of Energy	Mario Tiaoqui	July 1, 1998 – January 20, 2001
Secretary of Environment and Natural Resources	Antonio Cerilles	July 1, 1998 – January 20, 2001
Secretary of Finance	Edgardo Espiritu	July 1, 1998 – December 31, 1999
Secretary of Finance	Jose Pardo	January 2, 2000 – January 20, 2001
Secretary of Foreign Affairs	Domingo Siazon Jr.	June 30, 1998 – January 20, 2001
Secretary of Health	Felipe Estrella Jr.	June 30, 1998 – September 13, 1998
Secretary of Health	Alberto Romualdez	September 14, 1998 – January 20, 2001
Secretary of the Interior and Local Government	Joseph Ejercito Estrada (in concurrent capacity as President)	July 1, 1998 – April 12, 1999
Secretary of the Interior and Local Government	Ronaldo Puno	April 12, 1999 – January 7, 2000
Secretary of the Interior and Local Government	Alfredo Lim	January 8, 2000 – January 19, 2001
Secretary of Justice	Serafin R. Cuevas	June 30, 1998 – February 11, 2000
Secretary of Justice	Artemio Tuquero	February 11, 2000 – January 20, 2001
Secretary of Labor and Employment	Bienvenido Laguesma	June 30, 1998 – January 20, 2001
Secretary of National Defense	Orlando S. Mercado	June 30, 1998 – January 20, 2001
Secretary of Public Works and Highways	Gregorio Vigilar	June 30, 1998 – January 20, 2001
Secretary of Science and Technology	William Padolina	June 30, 1998 – January 29, 1999
Secretary of Science and Technology	Filemino Uriarte	February 1, 1999 – January 1, 2001
Secretary of Science and Technology	Rogelio A. Panlasigui	January 2, 2001 – January 20, 2001
Secretary of Social Welfare and Development	Gloria Macapagal Arroyo	July 1, 1998 – October 3, 2000
Secretary of Social Welfare and Development	Dulce Saguisag	October 4, 2000 – January 20, 2001
Secretary of Tourism	Gemma Cruz-Araneta	July 1, 1998 – January 19, 2001
Secretary of Trade and Industry	Jose Pardo	July 1, 1998 – 1999
Secretary of Trade and Industry	Manuel Roxas II	1999 – January 20, 2001
Secretary of Transportation and Communications	Vicente Rivera Jr.	July 1, 1998 – January 20, 2001
Director-General of the National Economic and Development Authority	Felipe Medalla (in concurrent capacity as Secretary of Socio-economic Planning)	July 1, 1998 – January 20, 2001
Presidential Spokesperson	Fernardo Barican	June 30, 1998 – January 20, 2001
Press Secretary	Rodolfo Reyes	June 30, 1998 – April 12, 2000
Press Secretary	Ricardo Puno	April 13, 2000 – January 20, 2001
Malacañang Chief of Staff	Aprodicio Laquian	February 2000 – March 22, 2000
Head of the Presidential Management Staff	Leonora de Jesus	June 30, 1998 – 2000
Head of the Presidential Management Staff	Macel Fernandez	2000 – January 20, 2001
Chairperson of the Commission on Higher Education	Angel Alcala	June 30, 1998 – July 11, 1999
Chairperson of the Commission on Higher Education	Ester Garcia	July 12, 1999 – January 20, 2001
Solicitor General	Ricardo P. Galvez	July 1, 1998 – January 20, 2001
Chairman of the Metropolitan Manila Development Authority	Jejomar Binay	July 1, 1998 – January 20, 2001
National Security Adviser	Alexander Aguirre	July 1, 1998 – January 19, 2001
Presidential Adviser on the Peace Process	Manuel Yan	June 30, 1998 – January 20, 2001
Lead Convenor of the National Anti-Poverty Commission	Horacio Morales Jr.	December 1998 – October 2000
Lead Convenor of the National Anti-Poverty Commission	Dulce Saguisag	October 2000 – January 20, 2001
Governor of the Bangko Sentral ng Pilipinas	Gabriel Singson	July 6, 1993 – July 5, 1999
Governor of the Bangko Sentral ng Pilipinas	Rafael Buenaventura	July 6, 1999 – July 3, 2005

== Gloria Macapagal Arroyo (2001–2010) ==
Office	Name	Term
President	Maria Gloria M. Macapagal-Arroyo	2001–2010
Vice-President	Teofisto Guingona Jr.	2001–2004
Vice-President	Noli de Castro	2004–2010
Executive Secretary	Renato de Villa	January 22, 2001 – May 7, 2001
Executive Secretary	Alberto Romulo	May 8, 2001 – August 24, 2004
Executive Secretary	Eduardo Ermita	August 24, 2004 – February 23, 2010
Executive Secretary	Leandro Mendoza	February 24, 2010 – June 30, 2010
Secretary of Agrarian Reform	Horacio Morales	July 1, 1998 – February 11, 2001
Secretary of Agrarian Reform	Hernani Braganza	February 12, 2001 – January 15, 2003
Secretary of Agrarian Reform	Roberto Pagdanganan	January 20, 2003 – January 20, 2004
Secretary of Agrarian Reform	Jose Marie Ponce	February 20, 2004 – August 24, 2004
Secretary of Agrarian Reform	Rene Villa	August 26, 2004 – July 9, 2005
Secretary of Agrarian Reform	Nasser Pangandaman	July 10, 2005 – June 30, 2010
Secretary of Agriculture	Domingo F. Panganiban	January 12, 2001 – March 31, 2001
Secretary of Agriculture	Leonardo Q. Montemayor	March 31, 2001 – December 8, 2002
Secretary of Agriculture	Luis Lorenzo Jr.	December 9, 2002 – August 15, 2004
Secretary of Agriculture	Arthur C. Yap	August 23, 2004 – July 15, 2005
Secretary of Agriculture	Domingo F. Panganiban	July 16, 2005 – October 22, 2006
Secretary of Agriculture	Arthur C. Yap	October 23, 2006 – March 4, 2010
Secretary of Agriculture	Bernie Fondevilla	March 5, 2010 – June 30, 2010
Secretary of Budget and Management	Emilia Boncodin	January 23, 2001 – July 9, 2005
Secretary of Budget and Management	Romulo Neri	July 19, 2005 – February 6, 2006
Secretary of Budget and Management	Rolando Andaya, Jr. (Acting)	February 6, 2006 – March 2, 2010
Secretary of Budget and Management	Joaquin Lagonera (Interim)	March 11, 2010 – June 4, 2010
Secretary of Budget and Management	Joaquin Lagonera (Acting)	June 5, 2010– June 30, 2010
Secretary of Education	Raul Roco	January 22, 2001 – August 2002
Secretary of Education	Edilberto de Jesus	September 2002 – August 2004
Secretary of Education	Florencio B. Abad	September 23, 2004 – July 8, 2005
Secretary of Education	Ramon Bacani (OIC)	July 8, 2005 – August 30, 2005
Secretary of Education	Fe Hidalgo (OIC)	August 31, 2005 – October 3, 2006
Secretary of Education	Jesli Lapus	October 4, 2006 – March 15, 2010
Secretary of Education	Mona Valisno	March 10, 2010 – June 30, 2010
Secretary of Energy	Jose Isidro Camacho	March 2, 2001 – June 7, 2001
Secretary of Energy	Vincent S. Pérez	June 8, 2001 – March 21, 2005
Secretary of Energy	Raphael Lotilla	March 22, 2005 – July 31, 2007
Secretary of Energy	Angelo T. Reyes	August 1, 2007 – March 25, 2010
Secretary of Energy	Jose C. Ibazeta	March 31, 2010 – June 30, 2010
Secretary of Environment and Natural Resources	Joemarie D. Gerochi (OIC)	January 26, 2001 – March 28, 2001
Secretary of Environment and Natural Resources	Heherson T. Alvarez	March 29, 2001 – December 12, 2002
Secretary of Environment and Natural Resources	Elisea G. Gozun	December 13, 2002 – August 31, 2004
Secretary of Environment and Natural Resources	Michael T. Defensor	September 1, 2004 – February 15, 2006
Secretary of Environment and Natural Resources	Angelo T. Reyes	February 16, 2006 – July 31, 2007
Secretary of Environment and Natural Resources	Jose L. Atienza Jr.	August 1, 2007 – December 28, 2009
Secretary of Environment and Natural Resources	Eleazar P. Quinto	January 4, 2010 – February 11, 2010
Secretary of Environment and Natural Resources	Horacio C. Ramos	February 12, 2010 – June 30, 2010
Secretary of Finance	Alberto G. Romulo	January 23, 2001 – June 30, 2001
Secretary of Finance	Jose Isidro N. Camacho	June 30, 2001 – November 30, 2003
Secretary of Finance	Juanita D. Amatong	December 1, 2003 – February 14, 2005
Secretary of Finance	Cesar V. Purisima	February 15, 2005 – July 15, 2005
Secretary of Finance	Margarito B. Teves	July 22, 2005 – June 30, 2010
Secretary of Foreign Affairs	Teofisto T. Guingona Jr.	January 2001 – July 2002
Secretary of Foreign Affairs	Blas F. Ople	July 2002 – December 2003
Secretary of Foreign Affairs	Delia Albert	December 2003 – August 2004
Secretary of Foreign Affairs	Alberto G. Romulo	August 24, 2004 – February 24, 2011
Secretary of Health	Manuel M. Dayrit	February 26, 2001 – April 31, 2005
Secretary of Health	Francisco T. Duque	June 1, 2005 – January 18, 2010
Secretary of Health	Esperanza I. Cabral	January 18, 2010 – June 30, 2010
Secretary of Health	Esperanza I. Cabral	June 30, 2010 – July 4, 2010
Secretary of the Interior and Local Government	Anselmo S. Avelino, Jr	January 20, 2001 – January 28, 2001
Secretary of the Interior and Local Government	Jose D. Lina, Jr.	January 29, 2001 – July 11, 2006
Secretary of the Interior and Local Government	Angelo T. Reyes	July 12, 2004 – February 16, 2006
Secretary of the Interior and Local Government	Ronaldo V. Puno	April 4, 2006 – June 30, 2010
Secretary of Justice	Hernando Perez	January 2001 – January 2002
Secretary of Justice	Maria Merceditas N. Gutierrez (Acting)	November 2002 – January 2003
Secretary of Justice	Simeon A. Datumanong	January 2003 – December 2003
Secretary of Justice	Maria Merceditas N. Gutierrez	December 24, 2003 – August 2004
Secretary of Justice	Raul M. Gonzalez	August 25, 2004 – June 2009
Secretary of Justice	Agnes Devanadera	June 9, 2009 – February 2010
Secretary of Justice	Alberto Agra (Acting)	March 1, 2010 – June 2010
Secretary of Labor and Employment	Patricia Aragon Santo Tomas	February 12, 2001 – June 2006
Secretary of Labor and Employment	Arturo D. Brion	June 16, 2006 – December 2008
Secretary of Labor and Employment	Marianito D. Roque	December 20, 2008 – June 30, 2010
Secretary of National Defense	Orlando S. Mercado	January 22–25, 2001
Secretary of National Defense	Angelo T. Reyes	March 19, 2001 – August 29, 2003
Secretary of National Defense	Gloria Macapagal-Arroyo (in concurrent capacity as President)	September 1 – October 2, 2003
Secretary of National Defense	Eduardo R. Ermita	October 3, 2003 – August 24, 2004
Secretary of National Defense	Avelino J. Cruz Jr.	August 25, 2004 – November 30, 2006
Secretary of National Defense	Gloria Macapagal-Arroyo (in concurrent capacity as President)	November 30, 2006 – February 1, 2007
Secretary of National Defense	Hermogenes E. Ebdane, Jr.	February 1 – July 1, 2007
Secretary of National Defense	Norberto Gonzales	July 1 – August 3, 2007
Secretary of National Defense	Gilberto C. Teodoro, Jr.	August 3, 2007 – November 15, 2009
Secretary of National Defense	Norberto Gonzales (Acting)	November 15, 2009 – June 30, 2010
Secretary of Public Works and Highways	Simeon A. Datumanong	2001 – 2003
Secretary of Public Works and Highways	Bayani F. Fernando	January 15, 2003 – April 15, 2003
Secretary of Public Works and Highways	Florente Soriquez (Acting)	April 16, 2003 – February 13, 2005
Secretary of Public Works and Highways	Hermogenes Ebdane Jr.	February 14, 2005 – February 5, 2007
Secretary of Public Works and Highways	Manuel M. Bonoan (OIC)	February 5, 2007 – July 3, 2007
Secretary of Public Works and Highways	Hermogenes Ebdane Jr.	July 3, 2007 – October 26, 2009
Secretary of Public Works and Highways	Victor A. Domingo (Acting)	October 26, 2009 – July 5, 2010
Secretary of Science and Technology	Rogelio A. Panlasigui (Acting)	January 2, 2001 – March 11, 2001
Secretary of Science and Technology	Estrella Alabastro	March 12, 2001 – June 30, 2010
Secretary of Social Welfare and Development	Corazon Juliano Soliman	January 29, 2001 – July 8, 2005
Secretary of Social Welfare and Development	Luwalhati F. Pablo (OIC)	July 9, 2005 – February 5, 2006
Secretary of Social Welfare and Development	Esperanza Cabral	February 6, 2006 – January 17, 2010
Secretary of Social Welfare and Development	Celia Yangco (Acting)	January 18, 2010 – June 30, 2010
Secretary of Tourism	Richard J. Gordon	February 12, 2001 – January 4, 2004
Secretary of Tourism	Robert Dean Barbers (OIC)	January 19, 2004 – February 25, 2004
Secretary of Tourism	Roberto Pagdanganan	June 12, 2004 – August 31, 2004
Secretary of Tourism	Evelyn B. Pantig (OIC)	September 1, 2004 – November 29, 2004
Secretary of Tourism	Joseph Ace Durano	November 30, 2004 – June 30, 2010
Secretary of Trade and Industry	Manuel Roxas II	1999 – 2003
Secretary of Trade and Industry	Cesar V. Purisima	2004 – 2005
Secretary of Trade and Industry	Juan B. Santos	2005 – 2005
Secretary of Trade and Industry	Peter B. Favila	2005 – 2010
Secretary of Transportation and Communication	Vicente C. Rivera Jr.	July 1, 1998 – January 30, 2001
Secretary of Transportation and Communication	Pantaleon Alvarez	January 29, 2001 – July 4, 2002
Secretary of Transportation and Communication	Leandro R. Mendoza	July 4, 2001 – March 10, 2010
Secretary of Transportation and Communication	Anneli R. Lontoc	March 10, 2010 – June 30, 2010
Cabinet Secretary	Ricardo Saludo	2001–2004
Cabinet Secretary	Silvestre H. Bello III	2004–2010
Chairperson of the Commission on Higher Education	Ester A. Garcia	July 12, 1999 – May 31, 2003
Chairperson of the Commission on Higher Education	Bro. Rolando Ramos Dizon, FSC	June 2, 2003 – October 17, 2004
Chairperson of the Commission on Higher Education	Fr. Rolando de la Rosa	October 18, 2004 – April 30, 2005
Chairperson of the Commission on Higher Education	Carlito S. Puno (Acting)	May 3, 2005 – November 16, 2005
Chairperson of the Commission on Higher Education	Carlito S. Puno	November 17, 2005 – August 15, 2007
Chairperson of the Commission on Higher Education	Romulo L. Neri (Acting)	August 16, 2007 – July 31, 2008
Chairperson of the Commission on Higher Education	Nona S. Ricafort (OIC)	August 1–31, 2008
Chairperson of the Commission on Higher Education	Emmanuel Y. Angeles (Acting)	September 1, 2008 – July 18, 2010
Chairperson of the Commission on Higher Education	Patricia B. Licuanan	July 19, 2010 – present
Chairman of the Metropolitan Manila Development Authority	Benjamin C. Abalos Sr.	January 2001 – 2002
Chairman of the Metropolitan Manila Development Authority	Bayani Fernando	February 2002 – 2009
Chairman of the Metropolitan Manila Development Authority	Oscar Innocentes	October 2009 – June 30, 2010
Chief of the Presidential Management Staff	Elena Bautista-Horn	2004 – 2010
Governor of the Bangko Sentral ng Pilipinas	Rafael Buenaventura	1999 – 2005
Governor of the Bangko Sentral ng Pilipinas	Amando Tetangco Jr.	2005 – 2011
Presidential Chief of Staff	Renato Corona	2001
Presidential Chief of Staff	Rigoberto Tiglao	2002 – 2004
Presidential Chief of Staff	Mike Defensor	2006 – 2007
Presidential Chief of Staff	Joey Salceda	2007
Lead Convenor of the National Anti-Poverty Commission	Dulce Q. Saguisag	November 2000 – February 2002
Lead Convenor of the National Anti-Poverty Commission	Teresita Quintos-Deles	February 2002 – October 2003
Lead Convenor of the National Anti-Poverty Commission	Camilo L. Sabio	October 6, 2003 – January 2004
Lead Convenor of the National Anti-Poverty Commission	Veronica F. Villavicencio	February 9, 2004 – August 2004
Lead Convenor of the National Anti-Poverty Commission	Imelda M. Nicolas	July 8, 2004 – July 8, 2005
Lead Convenor of the National Anti-Poverty Commission	Datu Zamzamin L. Ampatuan (Acting)	July 18, 2005
Lead Convenor of the National Anti-Poverty Commission	Cerge M. Remonde	August 16, 2006 – September 22, 2006
Lead Convenor of the National Anti-Poverty Commission	Domingo F. Panganiban	October 18, 2006 – June 2010
Director-General of the National Economic and Development Authority	Dante Canlas (in concurrent capacity as Secretary of Socio-economic Planning)	January 24, 2001 – December 16, 2002
Director-General of the National Economic and Development Authority	Romulo Neri (in concurrent capacity as Secretary of Socio-economic Planning)	December 17, 2002 – July 18, 2005
Director-General of the National Economic and Development Authority	Augusto Santos (in concurrent capacity as Secretary of Socio-economic Planning)	July 14, 2005 – February 16, 2006
Director-General of the National Economic and Development Authority	Romulo Neri (in concurrent capacity as Secretary of Socio-economic Planning)	February 16, 2006 – August 16, 2007
Director-General of the National Economic and Development Authority	Augusto Santos (Acting) (in concurrent capacity as Secretary of Socio-economic Planning)	August 16, 2007 – July 27, 2008
Director-General of the National Economic and Development Authority	Raphael G. Recto (in concurrent capacity as Secretary of Socio-economic Planning)	July 28, 2008 – August 16, 2009
Director-General of the National Economic and Development Authority	Augusto Santos (Acting) (in concurrent capacity as Secretary of Socio-economic Planning)	August 19, 2009 – June 29, 2010
National Security Adviser and Director-General	Roilo S. Golez	February 19, 2001 – January 4, 2004
National Security Adviser and Director-General	Norberto B. Gonzales	February 1, 2004 – August 21, 2004
National Security Adviser and Director-General	Hermogenes E. Ebdane, Jr.	August 22, 2004 – February 14, 2005
National Security Adviser and Director-General	Norberto B. Gonzales	February 15, 2005 – January 31, 2010
National Security Adviser and Director-General	Milo S. Ibrado Jr. (Acting)	December 15, 2009 – June 30, 2010
Presidential Adviser on the Peace Process	Eduardo R. Ermita	2001 – 2003
Presidential Adviser on the Peace Process	Teresita Quintos-Deles	October 2, 2003 – July 8, 2005
Presidential Adviser on the Peace Process	Jesus G. Dureza	July 2005 – June 15, 2008
Presidential Adviser on the Peace Process	Hermogenes C. Esperon, Jr.	June 15, 2008 – February 2009
Presidential Adviser on the Peace Process	Avelino Razon Jr.	February 2009 – October 12, 2009
Presidential Adviser on the Peace Process	Nabil A. Tan	October 13, 2009 – October 23, 2010
Presidential Adviser on the Peace Process	Annabelle Abaya	October 23, 2009 – June 30, 2010
Presidential Spokesperson	Rigoberto Tiglao	2001 – 2002
Presidential Spokesperson	Ignacio R. Bunye (in concurrent capacity as press secretary)	2002 – 2008
Presidential Spokesperson	Eduardo R. Ermita (in concurrent capacity as Executive Secretary)	2008 – 2009
Press Secretary	Noel C. Cabrera	January 23, 2001 – March 31, 2002
Press Secretary	Rigoberto D. Tiglao	April 1–15, 2002
Press Secretary	Silvestre Afable	April 16 – July 15, 2002
Press Secretary	Ignacio R. Bunye	July 16, 2002 – January 19, 2003
Press Secretary	Hernani A. Braganza	January 20, 2003 – June 17, 2003
Press Secretary	Milton A. Alingod	June 18, 2003 – August 30, 2004
Press Secretary	Ignacio R. Bunye	August 31, 2004 – June 15, 2008
Press Secretary	Jesus G. Dureza	June 16, 2008 – January 31, 2009
Press Secretary	Cerge M. Remonde	February 1, 2009 – January 19, 2010
Press Secretary	Conrado Limcaoco (Acting)	January 20–31, 2010
Press Secretary	Crispulo Icban Jr. (Acting)	February 1, 2010 – June 30, 2010
Solicitor General	Ricardo P. Galvez	2000–2001
Solicitor General	Simeon V. Marcelo	2001–2002
Solicitor General	Carlos N. Ortega	2002
Solicitor General	Alfredo L. Benipayo	2002–2006
Solicitor General	Antonio Eduardo B. Nachura	2006–2007
Solicitor General	Agnes VST Devanadera	2007–2010
Solicitor General	Alberto C. Agra	2010

== Benigno S. Aquino III (2010–2016) ==
Office	Name	Term
President	Benigno S. Aquino III	2010–2016
Vice President	Jejomar C. Binay	2010–2016
Cabinet Secretary	Jose Rene D. Almendras	November 5, 2012 – 2016
Executive Secretary	Paquito "Jojo" Ochoa Jr.	June 30, 2010 – 2016
Presidential Spokesperson	Edwin Lacierda	June 30, 2010 – 2016
Secretary of the Presidential Communications Operations Office	Herminio B. Coloma Jr.	June 30, 2010 – 2016
Chief of the Presidential Management Staff	Julia Abad	2010–2016
Chief Presidential Legal Counsel	Eduardo de Mesa	June 30, 2010 – December 18, 2012
Chief Presidential Legal Counsel	Alfredo Benjamin Caguioa	January 10, 2013 – October 12, 2015
Solicitor General	Jose Anselmo I. Cadiz	2010–2012
Solicitor General	Francis H. Jardeleza	2012–2014
Solicitor General	Florin T. Hilbay	2014–2016
Director-General of the National Economic and Development Authority	Cayetano Paderanga Jr. (in concurrent capacity as Secretary of Socio-economic Planning)	June 30, 2010 – May 10, 2012
Director-General of the National Economic and Development Authority	Arsenio Balisacan (in concurrent capacity as Secretary of Socio-economic Planning)	May 10, 2012 – 2016
Director-General of the National Economic and Development Authority	Emmanuel Esguerra (in concurrent capacity as Secretary of Socio-economic Planning)	2016
Presidential Assistant for Rehabilitation and Recovery	Panfilo "Ping" Lacson	2013–2015
Presidential Assistant for Food Security and Agriculture Modernization	Francis "Kiko" Pangilinan	2014–2015
Presidential Assistant for Food Security and Agriculture Modernization	Fredelita Guiza	2015–2016
Secretary of the Presidential Communications Development and Strategic Planning Office	Ramon Carandang	June 30, 2010 – 2013
Secretary of the Presidential Communications Development and Strategic Planning Office	Manuel "Manolo" Quezon III	2013–2016
Secretary of Agrarian Reform	Virgilio de los Reyes	June 30, 2010 – 2016
Secretary of Agriculture	Proceso Alcala	June 30, 2010 – 2016
Secretary of Budget and Management	Florencio "Butch" Abad	July 1, 2010 – 2016
Secretary of Education	Armin Luistro	June 30, 2010 – 2016
Secretary of Energy	Jose Rene D. Almendras	July 2, 2010 – November 5, 2012
Secretary of Energy	Carlos Jericho L. Petilla	November 5, 2012 – 2015
Secretary of Energy	Zenaida Monsada	2015–2016
Secretary of Environment and Natural Resources	Ramon J.P. Paje	July 1, 2010 – 2016
Secretary of Finance	Cesar V. Purisima	June 30, 2010 – 2016
Secretary of Foreign Affairs	Alberto G. Romulo	July 1, 2010 – February 24, 2011
Secretary of Foreign Affairs	Albert F. del Rosario	February 24, 2011 – 2016
Secretary of Foreign Affairs	Jose Rene Almendras (in acting capacity)	2016
Secretary of Health	Enrique T. Ona	July 5, 2010 – 2014
Secretary of Health	Janette Garin	2014–2016
Secretary of the Interior and Local Government	Benigno Aquino III (in concurrent capacity as President)	2010
Secretary of the Interior and Local Government	Jesse M. Robredo	July 9, 2010 – August 18, 2012
Secretary of the Interior and Local Government	Paquito "Jojo" Ochoa Jr. (in acting capacity)	2012
Secretary of the Interior and Local Government	Manuel Mar Roxas	September 20, 2012 – 2015
Secretary of the Interior and Local Government	Mel Senen Sarmiento	2015–2016
Secretary of Justice	Leila de Lima	June 30, 2010 – 2015
Secretary of Justice	Alfredo Benjamin Caguioa	2015–2016
Secretary of Justice	Emmanuel Caparas (in acting capacity)	2016
Secretary of Labor and Employment	Rosalinda Dimapilis-Baldoz	June 30, 2010 – 2016
Secretary of National Defense	Voltaire Gazmin	June 30, 2010 – 2016
Secretary of Public Works and Highways	Rogelio Singson	June 30, 2010 – 2016
Secretary of Science and Technology	Mario Montejo	June 30, 2010 – 2016
Secretary of Social Welfare and Development	Corazon Juliano Soliman	July 1, 2010 – 2016
Secretary of Tourism	Alberto Lim	July 1, 2010 – August 31, 2011
Secretary of Tourism	Ramon "Mon" Jimenez Jr.	2011–2016
Secretary of Trade and Industry	Gregory Domingo	June 30, 2010 – 2015
Secretary of Trade and Industry	Adrian S. Cristobal Jr.	2015–2016
Secretary of Transportation and Communications	Jose de Jesus	June 30, 2012 – June 30, 2011
Secretary of Transportation and Communications	Mar Roxas	2011–2012
Secretary of Transportation and Communications	Joseph Emilio A. Abaya	September 20, 2012 – June 30, 2016
Chairperson of the Commission on Higher Education	Patricia B. Licuanan	July 19, 2010 – June 30, 2016
Chairman of the Metropolitan Manila Development Authority	Francis Tolentino	August 3, 2010 – October 7, 2015
Presidential Adviser on the Peace Process	Teresita Quintos-Deles	July 1, 2010 – June 30, 2016
Lead Convenor of the National Anti-Poverty Commission	Jose Eliseo M. Rocamora	November 8, 2010 – June 30, 2016
National Security Adviser and Director-General	Cesar P. Garcia Jr.	July 5, 2010 – June 30, 2016
Governor of the Bangko Sentral ng Pilipinas	Amando Tetangco Jr.	2011–2017

== Rodrigo Duterte (2016–2022) ==
Office	Name	Term
President	Rodrigo Duterte	June 30, 2016 – June 30, 2022
Vice-President	Leni Robredo	June 30, 2016 – June 30, 2022
Executive Secretary	Salvador Medialdea	June 30, 2016 – June 30, 2022
Special Assistant to the President	Bong Go	June 30, 2016 – October 15, 2018
Special Assistant to the President	Jesus Melchor Quitain (OIC)	November 12, 2018 – June 30, 2022
Chief Presidential Legal Counsel	Salvador Panelo	June 30, 2016 – October 8, 2021
Chief Presidential Legal Counsel	Jesus Melchor Quitain	October 19, 2021 – June 30, 2022
Cabinet Secretary	Leoncio Evasco Jr.	June 30, 2016 – October 16, 2018
Cabinet Secretary	Karlo Nograles	November 5, 2018 – March 7, 2022
Cabinet Secretary	Melvin Matibag (Acting)	March 8, 2022 – June 30, 2022
Director-General of the National Economic and Development Authority	Ernesto Pernia (in concurrent capacity as Secretary of Socio-economic Planning)	June 30, 2016 – April 17, 2020
Director-General of the National Economic and Development Authority	Karl Kendrick Chua (in concurrent capacity as Secretary of Socio-economic Planning)	April 17, 2020 – June 30, 2022
Solicitor General	Jose Calida	June 30, 2016 – June 30, 2022
Secretary of Agrarian Reform	Rafael V. Mariano	June 30, 2016 – September 6, 2017
Secretary of Agrarian Reform	Rosalina Bistoyong (OIC)	September 11, 2017 – November 30, 2017
Secretary of Agrarian Reform	John Castriciones	December 1, 2017 (Acting) / March 22, 2018 – October 14, 2021
Secretary of Agrarian Reform	Bernie Cruz (Acting)	October 28, 2021 – June 22, 2022
Secretary of Agrarian Reform	David Erro (OIC)	June 22, 2022 – June 30, 2022
Secretary of Agriculture	Manny Piñol	June 30, 2016 – June 27, 2019
Secretary of Agriculture	William Dar	August 5, 2019 – June 30, 2022
Secretary of Budget and Management	Benjamin Diokno	June 30, 2016 – March 4, 2019
Secretary of Budget and Management	Janet Abuel (OIC)	March 5, 2019 – August 5, 2019
Secretary of Budget and Management	Wendel Avisado	August 5, 2019 – August 13, 2021
Secretary of Budget and Management	Tina Rose Marie Canda (OIC)	August 13, 2021 – June 30, 2022
Secretary of Education	Leonor Briones	June 30, 2016 – June 30, 2022
Secretary of Energy	Alfonso Cusi	June 30, 2016 – June 30, 2022
Secretary of Environment and Natural Resources	Gina López	June 30, 2016 – May 3, 2017
Secretary of Environment and Natural Resources	Roy Cimatu	May 8, 2017 – February 18, 2022
Secretary of Environment and Natural Resources	Jim Sampluna (Acting)	February 18, 2022 – June 22, 2022
Secretary of Environment and Natural Resources	Joselin Marcus Fragada (OIC)	June 22, 2022 – June 30, 2022
Secretary of Finance	Carlos Dominguez III	June 30, 2016 – June 30, 2022
Secretary of Foreign Affairs	Perfecto Yasay Jr.	June 30, 2016 – March 8, 2017
Secretary of Foreign Affairs	Enrique Manalo (Acting)	March 9, 2017 – May 17, 2017
Secretary of Foreign Affairs	Alan Peter Cayetano	May 18, 2017 – October 17, 2018
Secretary of Foreign Affairs	Teodoro Locsin, Jr.	October 17, 2018 – June 30, 2022
Secretary of Health	Paulyn Jean Rosell-Ubial, M.D.	June 30, 2016 – October 10, 2017
Secretary of Health	Herminigildo V. Valle (OIC)	October 12, 2017 – October 25, 2017
Secretary of Health	Francisco Duque III	October 26, 2017 – June 30, 2022
Secretary of Human Settlements and Urban Development	Eduardo del Rosario	January 7, 2020 – June 30, 2022
Secretary of Information and Communications Technology	Rodolfo Salalima	June 30, 2016 – September 22, 2017
Secretary of Information and Communications Technology	Eliseo M. Rio, Jr.	October 12, 2017 – June 30, 2019
Secretary of Information and Communications Technology	Gregorio Honasan	July 1, 2019 – October 8, 2021
Secretary of Information and Communications Technology	Jose Arturo De Castro (OIC)	October 28, 2021 – December 19, 2021
Secretary of Information and Communications Technology	Emmanuel Rey Caintic (Acting)	December 20, 2021 – June 30, 2022
Secretary of the Interior and Local Government	Ismael Sueno	June 30, 2016 – April 4, 2017
Secretary of the Interior and Local Government	Catalino Cuy (OIC)	April 5, 2017 – January 5, 2018
Secretary of the Interior and Local Government	Eduardo Año	January 5, 2018 (OIC) / November 5, 2018 – June 30, 2022
Secretary of Justice	Vitaliano Aguirre II	June 30, 2016 – April 5, 2018
Secretary of Justice	Menardo Guevarra	April 5, 2018 – June 30, 2022
Secretary of Labor and Employment	Silvestre Bello III	June 30, 2016 – June 30, 2022
Secretary of Migrant Workers	Abdullah Derupong Mama-o	March 9, 2022 – June 30, 2022
Secretary of National Defense	Delfin Lorenzana	June 30, 2016 – June 30, 2022
Secretary of Public Works and Highways	Rafael Yabut (Acting)	July 1, 2016 – July 26/27, 2016
Secretary of Public Works and Highways	Mark Villar	June 30, 2016 – October 4, 2021
Secretary of Public Works and Highways	Roger Mercado (OIC)	October 13, 2021 – June 30, 2022
Secretary of Science and Technology	Fortunato de la Peña	June 30, 2016 – June 30, 2022
Secretary of Social Welfare and Development	Judy Taguiwalo	June 30, 2016 – August 16, 2017
Secretary of Social Welfare and Development	Emmanuel A. Leyco (OIC)	August 19, 2017 – May 9, 2018
Secretary of Social Welfare and Development	Virginia Orogo	May 10, 2018 – October 15, 2018
Secretary of Social Welfare and Development	Rolando Joselito Bautista	October 17, 2018 – June 30, 2022
Secretary of Tourism	Wanda Corazon Teo	June 30, 2016 – May 8, 2018
Secretary of Tourism	Bernadette Romulo-Puyat	May 8, 2018 – June 30, 2022
Secretary of Trade and Industry	Ramon Lopez	June 30, 2016 – June 30, 2022
Secretary of Transportation	Arthur Tugade	June 30, 2016 – June 30, 2022
Presidential Spokesperson	Ernesto Abella	June 30, 2016 – October 27, 2017
Presidential Spokesperson	Harry Roque	October 29, 2017 – October 15, 2018
Presidential Spokesperson	Salvador Panelo	October 15, 2018 – April 12, 2020
Presidential Spokesperson	Harry Roque	April 13, 2020 – November 15, 2021
Presidential Spokesperson	Karlo Nograles (Acting)	November 15, 2021 – March 7, 2022
Presidential Spokesperson	Martin Andanar (Acting)	March 8, 2022 – June 30, 2022
Secretary of the Presidential Communications Operations Office	Martin Andanar	June 30, 2016 – June 30, 2022
National Security Adviser	Hermogenes Esperon	June 30, 2016 – June 30, 2022
Presidential Adviser on the Peace Process	Jesus Dureza	June 30, 2016 – November 27, 2018
Presidential Adviser on the Peace Process	Carlito Galvez Jr.	December 12, 2018 – June 30, 2022
Governor of the Bangko Sentral ng Pilipinas	Amando Tetangco Jr.	July 31, 2011 – July 3, 2017
Governor of the Bangko Sentral ng Pilipinas	Nestor Espenilla Jr.	July 3, 2017 – February 23, 2019
Governor of the Bangko Sentral ng Pilipinas	Benjamin Diokno	March 4, 2019 – June 30, 2022

== Bongbong Marcos (2022–present) ==
Office	Name	Term
President	Ferdinand Marcos Jr.	June 30, 2022 –
Vice-President	Sara Duterte-Carpio	June 30, 2022 –
Executive Secretary	Victor Rodriguez	June 30, 2022 – September 17, 2022
Executive Secretary	Lucas Bersamin	September 27, 2022 – November 17, 2025
Executive Secretary	Ralph Recto (Ad interim)	November 17, 2025 –
Special Assistant for the President	Antonio Ernesto Lagdameo Jr.	June 30, 2022 –
Chief Presidential Legal Counsel	Juan Ponce Enrile	June 30, 2022 – November 13, 2025
Chief Presidential Legal Counsel	Anna Liza Gonzalez-Logan	December 16, 2025 –
Chief of the Presidential Management Staff	Zenaida Angping	June 30, 2022 – December 2, 2022
Chief of the Presidential Management Staff	Elaine Masukat	December 2, 2022 –
Secretary of Presidential Communications Office	Trixie Cruz-Angeles	June 30, 2022 – October 4, 2022
Secretary of Presidential Communications Office	Cheloy Garafil	October 7, 2022 – September 4, 2024
Secretary of Presidential Communications Office	Cesar Chavez (Acting)	September 5, 2024 – February 20, 2025
Secretary of Presidential Communications Office	Jay Ruiz (Acting)	February 21, 2025 – July 10, 2025
Secretary of Presidential Communications Office	Dave Gomez (OIC)	July 10, 2025 – October 13, 2026
Secretary of Presidential Communications Office	Lino Edgardo Cayetano (Ad interim)	October 13, 2026 –
Cabinet Secretary	Benjamin Abalos Jr.	July 8, 2026 –
Secretary of Agrarian Reform	Conrado Estrella III	June 30, 2022 –
Secretary of Agriculture	Bongbong Marcos (in concurrent capacity as President)	June 30, 2022 – November 3, 2023
Secretary of Agriculture	Francisco Laurel Jr.	November 3, 2023 –
Secretary of Budget and Management	Amenah Pangandaman	June 30, 2022 – November 17, 2025
Secretary of Budget and Management	Rolando Toledo (OIC)	November 17, 2025 – May 18, 2026
Secretary of Budget and Management	Kim Robert de Leon (Ad Interim)	May 19, 2026 –
Secretary of Economy, Planning, and Development	Arsenio Balisacan	June 30, 2022 –
Secretary of Education	Sara Duterte (in concurrent capacity as Vice President)	June 30, 2022 – July 19, 2024
Secretary of Education	Juan Edgardo Angara	July 19, 2024 –
Secretary of Energy	Raphael Lotilla	July 11, 2022 – May 22, 2025
Secretary of Energy	Sharon Garin	May 23, 2025 –
Secretary of Environment and Natural Resources	Ernesto D. Adobo Jr. (OIC)	June 30, 2022 – July 12, 2022
Secretary of Environment and Natural Resources	Toni Yulo-Loyzaga	July 12, 2022 – May 22, 2025
Secretary of Environment and Natural Resources	Raphael Lotilla	May 23, 2025 – February 28, 2026
Secretary of Environment and Natural Resources	Juan Miguel Cuna (Ad interim)	February 28, 2026 –
Secretary of Finance	Benjamin Diokno	June 30, 2022 – January 12, 2024
Secretary of Finance	Ralph Recto	January 12, 2024 – November 17, 2025
Secretary of Finance	Frederick Go (OIC)	November 17, 2025 –
Secretary of Foreign Affairs	Enrique Manalo	July 1, 2022 – July 1, 2025
Secretary of Foreign Affairs	Maria Theresa Lazaro	July 1, 2025 –
Secretary of Health	Maria Rosario Vergeire (OIC)	July 14, 2022 – June 5, 2023
Secretary of Health	Teodoro Herbosa	June 5, 2023 – July 13, 2026
Secretary of Health	Jose Pujalte Jr. (Ad interim)	July 13, 2026 – August 10, 2026
Secretary of Health	Edwin Mercado (Ad interim)	August 10, 2026 –
Secretary of Human Settlements and Urban Development	Melissa A. Aradanas, CESO II (OIC)	June 30, 2022 – July 29, 2022
Secretary of Human Settlements and Urban Development	Jose Acuzar	July 29, 2022 – May 22, 2025
Secretary of Human Settlements and Urban Development	Jose Ramon Aliling	May 26, 2025 –
Secretary of Information and Communications Technology	Ivan John Uy	June 30, 2022 – March 6, 2025
Secretary of Information and Communications Technology	Paul Mercado (OIC)	March 10, 2025 – March 20, 2025
Secretary of Information and Communications Technology	Henry Aguda	March 20, 2025 - October 9, 2026
Secretary of Information and Communications Technology	Robert Joseph de Claro	October 13, 2026 -
Secretary of the Interior and Local Government	Benjamin Abalos Jr.	June 30, 2022 – October 8, 2024
Secretary of the Interior and Local Government	Juanito Victor Remulla Jr.	October 8, 2024 –
Secretary of Justice	Jesus Crispin Remulla	June 30, 2022 – October 9,2025
Secretary of Justice	Fredderick Vida (Ad Interim)	October 9, 2025 –
Secretary of Labor and Employment	Bienvenido Laguesma	June 30, 2022 – May 25, 2026
Secretary of Labor and Employment	Francis Tolentino (Ad Interim)	May 25, 2026 –
Secretary of Migrant Workers	Susan Ople	June 30, 2022 – August 22, 2023
Secretary of Migrant Workers	Hans Leo Cacdac	September 7, 2023 –
Secretary of National Defense	Jose Faustino Jr. (OIC)	June 30, 2023 – January 9, 2023
Secretary of National Defense	Carlito Galvez Jr. (OIC)	January 9, 2023 – June 5, 2023
Secretary of National Defense	Gilberto Eduardo Gerardo Teodoro Jr.	June 5, 2023 –
Secretary of Public Works and Highways	Manuel Bonoan	June 30, 2022 – September 1, 2025
Secretary of Public Works and Highways	Vivencio Dizon (OIC)	September 1, 2025 – October 25, 2025
Secretary of Public Works and Highways	Giovanni Lopez (Ad Interim)	October 26, 2025 –
Secretary of Science and Technology	Renato Solidum Jr.	July 22, 2022 –
Secretary of Social Welfare and Development	Erwin Tulfo	June 30, 2022 – December 27, 2022
Secretary of Social Welfare and Development	Eduardo Punay (OIC)	December 27, 2022 – January 31, 2023
Secretary of Social Welfare and Development	Rexlon Gatchalian	January 31, 2023 –
Secretary of Tourism	Christina Frasco	June 30, 2022 – March 12, 2026
Secretary of Tourism	Verna Buensuceso (OIC)	March 18, 2026 – April 9, 2026
Secretary of Tourism	Maria Bernardita Angara-Mathay (Ad Interim)	April 10, 2026 –
Secretary of Trade and Industry	Alfredo Pascual	June 30, 2022 – August 2, 2024
Secretary of Trade and Industry	Maria Cristina Aldeguer-Roque	August 3, 2024 –
Secretary of Transportation	Jaime Bautista	June 30, 2022 – February 21, 2025
Secretary of Transportation	Vince Dizon	February 21, 2025 – August 31, 2025
Secretary of Transportation	Giovanni Lopez (Acting)	September 1, 2025 – October 25, 2025
Secretary of Transportation	Vivencio Dizon (Ad Interim)	October 26, 2025 –
Governor of the Bangko Sentral ng Pilipinas	Felipe Medalla	June 30, 2022 – July 2, 2023
Governor of the Bangko Sentral ng Pilipinas	Eli Remolona Jr. (in concurrent capacity as ex officio Chairman of the Anti-Money Laundering Council)	July 2, 2023 –
Chief of Staff of the Armed Forces of the Philippines	Bartolome Vicente Bacarro	August 8, 2022 – January 6, 2023
Chief of Staff of the Armed Forces of the Philippines	Andres Centino	January 6, 2023 – July 19, 2023
Chief of Staff of the Armed Forces of the Philippines	Romeo Brawner Jr.	July 19, 2023 – July 21, 2026
Chief of Staff of the Armed Forces of the Philippines	Antonio Nafarrete	July 21, 2026 –
Executive Director of National Disaster Risk Reduction and Management Council	Raymundo Ferrer	August 2, 2022 – December 28, 2022
Executive Director of National Disaster Risk Reduction and Management Council	Ariel Nepomuceno	December 29, 2022 – June 30, 2025
Executive Director of National Disaster Risk Reduction and Management Council	Harold Cabreros	August 6, 2025 –
National Security Adviser	Clarita Carlos	June 30, 2022 – January 14, 2023
National Security Adviser	Eduardo Año	January 14, 2023 – April 15, 2026
National Security Adviser	Eduardo Oban Jr.	April 15, 2026 –
Chairperson of Philippine Sports Commission	Noli Eala	August 30, 2022 – December 28, 2022
Chairperson of Philippine Sports Commission	Dickie Bachmann	December 28, 2022 – June 28, 2025
Chairperson of Philippine Sports Commission	Patrick Gregorio	July 1, 2025 –
Chairman of National Commission for Culture and the Arts	Victorino Mapa Manalo	January 4, 2023 – January 7, 2025
Chairman of National Commission for Culture and the Arts	Eric Zerrudo	January 7, 2025 –
Director-General of Philippine Space Agency	Joel Marciano Jr.	June 30, 2022 – September 16,2025
Director-General of Philippine Space Agency	Gay Jane Perez (Ad Interim)	September 16,2025 –
Solicitor General	Menardo Guevarra	June 30, 2022 – May 29, 2025
Solicitor General	Darlene Marie Berberabe	May 29, 2025 –
