= Oscar Castelo =

Filipino judge (1903–1982)

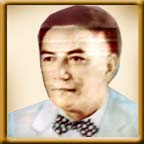

Secretary of National Defense
- In office March 1, 1953 – December 30, 1953
- President: Elpidio Quirino
- Preceded by: Ramon Magsaysay
- Succeeded by: Ramon Magsaysay

Secretary of Justice
- In office January 1, 1952 – August 16, 1953
- President: Elpidio Quirino
- Preceded by: Jose P. Bengzon
- Succeeded by: Roberto Gianzon

Personal details
- Born: Oscar Tombo Castelo; May 20, 1903 Cabanatuan, Nueva Ecija, Philippine Islands
- Died: June 20, 1982 (aged 79) Los Angeles, California, U.S.
- Relations: Tito Sotto (nephew); Val Sotto (nephew); Vic Sotto (nephew)
- Occupation: Lawyer

Oscar Tombo Castelo (May 20, 1903 – June 20, 1982) was a Filipino judge of the Manila Court and Secretary of National Defense of the Philippines. Born in Cabanatuan, Nueva Ecija, Castelo enrolled at the San Juan de Letran and later at Escuela de Derecho. He was admitted to the Philippine Bar in 1927 and was equally fluent in English and Spanish. He later moved to United States in California, where he soon died on June 20, 1982, aged 79.

== See also ==
- Department of National Defense
- List of Cabinets of the Philippines
