= Catalino Macaraig Jr. =

Filipino lawyer (1927-2003)

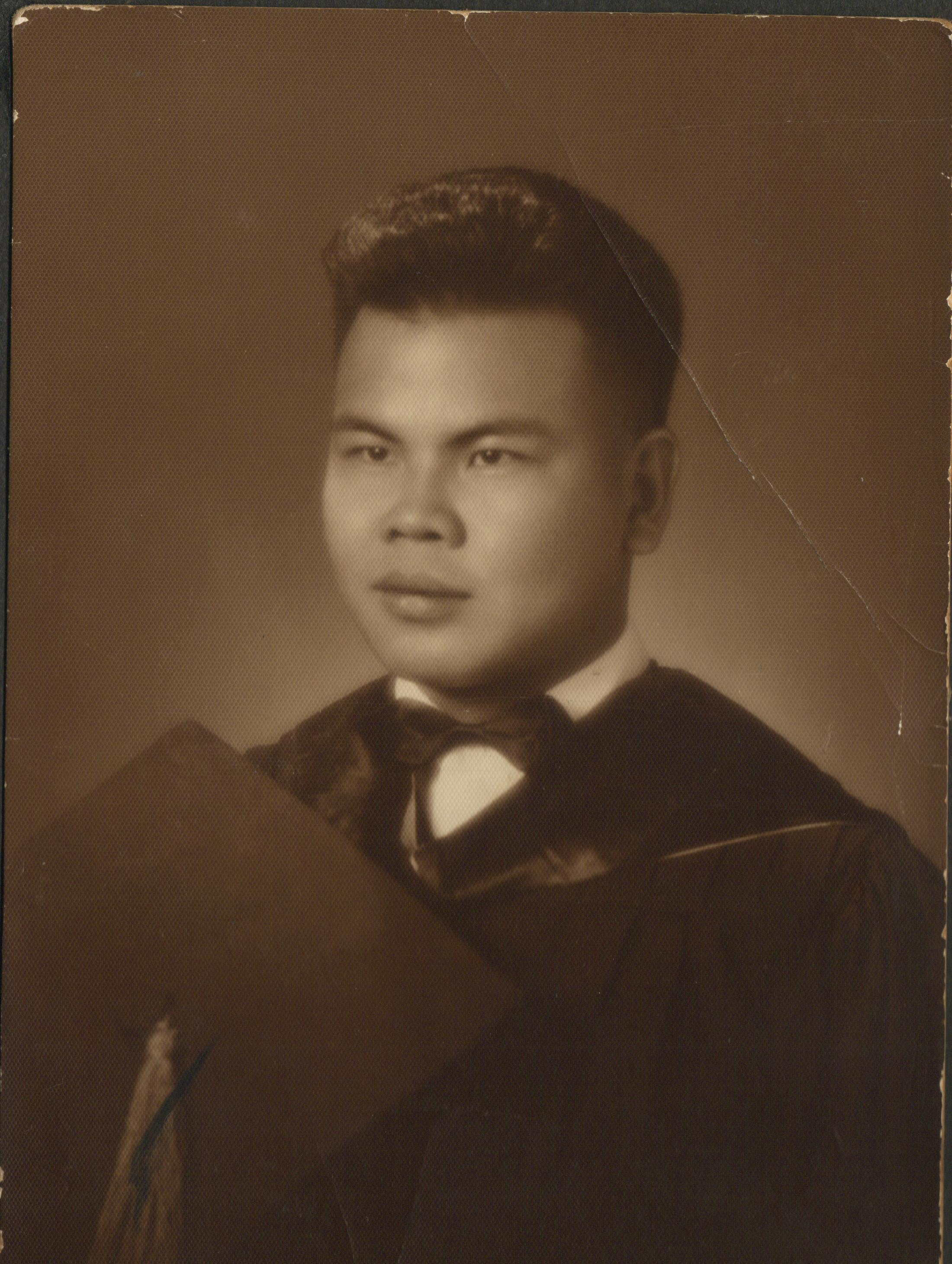
- Catalino Macaraig Jr., A.B. and LL.B., University of the Philippines, 1952 (Photo from U.P.'s Philippinensian 1952 yearbook)

23rd Executive Secretary of the Philippines
- In office September 17, 1987 – December 14, 1990
- President: Corazon Aquino
- Preceded by: Joker Arroyo
- Succeeded by: Oscar Orbos

Minister of Justice
- In office January 17, 1979 – July 22, 1979
- President: Ferdinand Marcos
- Preceded by: Vicente Abad Santos
- Succeeded by: Ricardo C. Puno

Personal details
- Born: Catalino Tiacho Macaraig Jr. November 5, 1927 Santa Cruz, Manila, Philippine Islands
- Died: November 16, 2003 (aged 76)
- Spouse: Araceli Villareal Andaya
- Children: 6
- Education: University of the Philippines Diliman (AB); University of Michigan (LLB)

Catalino Tiacho Macaraig Jr. (November 5, 1927 – November 2003) was a Filipino lawyer who was the longest-serving from 1987, to 1990 as Executive Secretary of President Corazon C. Aquino.

== Early life and education ==
Macaraig was born in Santa Cruz, Manila, Philippines on November 5, 1927, to Catalino Macaraig and Ignacia Tiacho Macaraig. His only sibling was a younger sister, Gloria, born in 1932.

Macaraig was a product of the Philippine public school system from his elementary to his university years: Santa Ana Elementary School, Araullo High School, Arellano High School (where he graduated in 1946), and the University of the Philippines Diliman (UP), where he graduated in 1952 with a Bachelor of Arts (AB) and a Bachelor of Laws (LLB).

While at UP, Macaraig was a member of Upsilon Sigma Phi, the oldest Greek-letter fraternity in Asia. He was also a member of the U.P. Vanguards, the university's Reserve Officer Training Corps unit and the pioneer of ROTC in the Philippines. He was involved in athletics as a member of the UP varsity weightlifting team and the UP Law swimming team.

After he obtained his law degree and passed the Philippine bar exams in 1952, Macaraig left for the United States and earned a Master of Laws degree (LLM) in 1954 from the University of Michigan Law School, where he specialized in international law and public administration.

== Legal career ==
Soon after returning to the Philippines in 1954, Macaraig began a career in government when he joined the Department of Justice as Judicial Supervisor in the Judiciary Division. In the 1960s, he rose through the ranks in a succession of positions: special attorney, prosecution division, chief legal officer, law division, and chief of the technical staff. At this time, he also held concurrent positions as Director of the Bureau of Prisons from 1966 to 1967, Member and later Chairman of the Board of Pardons and Parole from 1962 to 1970, Chairman of the Appeals Committee for Motion Pictures, and Chairman of the Interim Board of Censors for Motion Pictures.

Macaraig also got involved in teaching as a Professorial Lecturer in the UP College of Law, teaching different subjects in the evenings for almost a decade beginning in 1963. He was one of the incorporators of the UP Law Alumni Association in 1973, and later served as Vice President of the UP Law Alumni Foundation.

In 1970, he was invited to join the Philippine judiciary as District Judge of the Court of First Instance of Laguna and San Pablo City, and he was appointed Undersecretary of Justice in April 1971.

Macaraig was a member of the following entities at one time or another during his work in the government's executive branch: Dangerous Drugs Board, Council for the Welfare of Children, Human Settlements Regulatory Commission, Presidential Action Committee on Land Problems, Committee on Negotiated Contracts, Technical Staff for the Philippine Military Bases Panel and the North Borneo Claim, UP Law Center's Revised Administrative Code Project and Special Committee Symposium on the Treatment of Offenders, and Constitutional Revision Project.

On September 21, 1972, Philippine President Ferdinand Marcos declared martial law in the Philippines. In 1978, the Philippines' form of government was converted from presidential to parliamentary; hence, the Department of Justice became the Ministry of Justice, while Macaraig became a Deputy Minister of Justice. Macaraig stayed on in government because he believed that honest public servants and career officials should not abandon the ship of state, even if it was being steered by a corrupt and abusive leader.

Macaraig was appointed Minister of Justice from January to July 1979, but he was soon demoted to Deputy Minister as a result of policy differences with Marcos. These increasing disagreements made his remaining in government untenable, so he retired in January 1980.

== Private sector ==
Following Macaraig's resignation from government work, he was hired by Lepanto Consolidated Mining Co., a publicly listed and premier Philippine company. From 1980 to 1987, Macaraig held various positions in Lepanto and its subsidiaries: Director and Senior Vice President of Lepanto; Director and President of Insular Lumber Co. (Phils.), Inc.; Director and Vice President of Manila Mining Corporation, Shipside Inc., Diamond Drilling Corporation of the Philippines, Diaboart Products Philippines, Philippine Fire and Marine Insurance Corporation, and Lepanto Investment and Development Corporation.

== Return to government ==
In 1986, the People Power Revolution began, resulting in Marcos being deposed and replaced by Corazon Aquino as President of the republic. By March 1987, President Aquino had drafted Macaraig into her cabinet as Deputy Executive Secretary. Macaraig had been highly recommended by Aquino's first Executive Secretary, Joker Arroyo.

In September 1987, President Aquino reorganized her Cabinet after a coup attempt against her administration. She replaced Joker Arroyo with Macaraig as Executive Secretary.

In Philippine government, the position of Executive Secretary is "the most important office under the Chief Executive and is considered a department in itself. The Executive Secretary—often referred to as the "Little President"—handles the official relations of the President with all other department and instrumentalities of the government. He holds a very vital position. He is often called upon to represent the person of the president in official acts and ceremonies. He also acts as the head of the bureaus and offices not under any departments of the government and placed under the supervision of the Office of the President."

Macaraig was President Aquino's longest-serving among her five Executive Secretaries during her six-year term. In his over three years as Executive Secretary, Macaraig was regarded as one of Aquino's Cabinet secretaries who diligently and with integrity fulfilled their duties to the office, the president, and the country, such that he was considered by some people to be a hero.

Despite concurrently holding top posts in the country's biggest corporations at one time or another (among these, he was Chairman of Philippine National Oil Company, Philippine Airlines and Philippine National Bank), Macaraig never took advantage of his positions for personal gain.

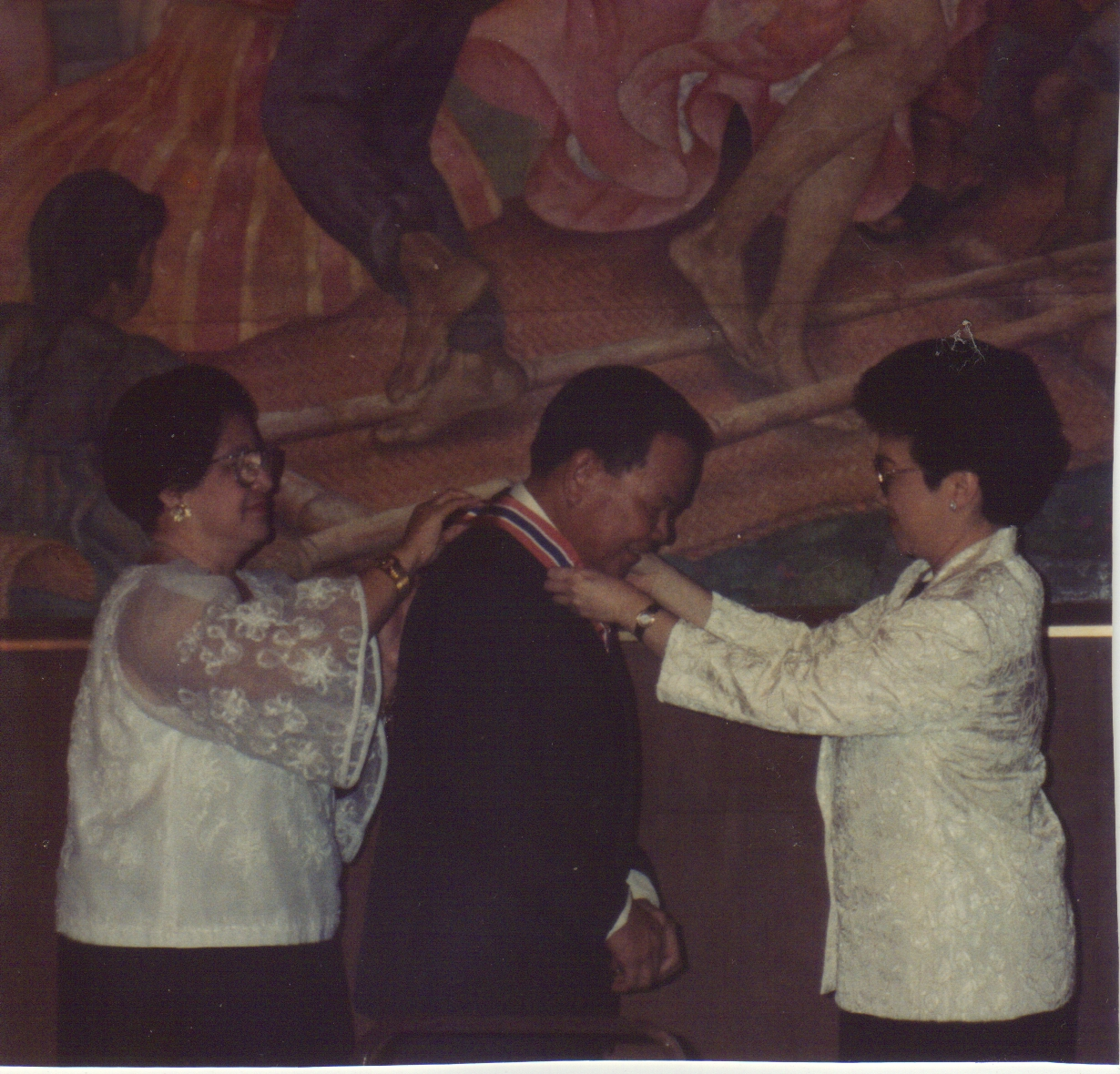
President Corazon C. Aquino bestows the Philippine Legion of Honor on outgoing Executive Secretary Catalino Macaraig Jr., as Mrs. Araceli A. Macaraig assists her (photo from Macaraig family archives)

On December 26, 1990, shortly after Macaraig stepped down as Executive Secretary, President Aquino conferred upon him one of the highest awards her office could bestow, the Philippine Legion of Honor, Degree of Commander. President Aquino's citation includes the following:

"In recognition for his outstanding and meritorious services rendered to the Republic of the Philippine in the span of thirty years, culminating in his three-year tenure as Executive Secretary of the Office of the President. For his steadfast leadership and action at the time of grave danger to our democratic institutions where he successfully, courageously, and quietly coordinated the task of saving the republic…For his exemplary efforts and zeal, and for pursuing the national interest and ensuring that the presidency and the people are served, foregoing credit for himself…For a record of honesty and integrity worthy of emulation."

== Private life and retirement ==
Macaraig later returned to work for the Lepanto Consolidated Mining Company until he retired in 1997 at the age of 70.

== Later life and death ==
After his 76th birthday on November 5, 2003, Macaraig underwent a second cataract operation, then was confined at the National Kidney Institute (NKI) for an emergency vascular operation. Shortly after he was discharged from the NKI, he suffered cardiac arrest and died on November 16, 2003.

== Legacy ==
Shortly after Macaraig's death, his family and friends established the Catalino T. Macaraig Jr. Scholarship in the UP College of Law for the tuition support of a law student, preferably one employed in the executive or judicial branches.

== Personal life ==
On December 18, 1955, he married Araceli (Celi) Villareal Andaya (Bachelor of Arts in Psychology, University of the Philippines (UP), 1952; Master of Science, Purdue University, West Lafayette, Indiana, 1954), a native of Mambusao, Capiz. They had six children.

== Awards ==
Macaraig received the Most Distinguished Alumnus Award (Sunburst Order – Golden Class) of the Arellano (Manila North) High School in 1977 and the Upsilonian Noble and Outstanding (UNO) Award, the highest recognition conferred on Upsilonians.

== See also ==
- Executive Secretary (Philippines)
- List of Cabinets of the Philippines
