= Pedro Tuason =

Filipino lawyer and government official

The Honorable Pedro Tuason
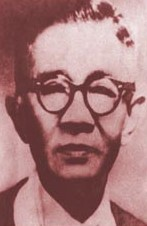

27th Secretary of Justice
- In office January 4, 1954 – March 19, 1958
- President: Ramon Magsaysay; Carlos P. Garcia
- Preceded by: Roberto Gianzon
- Succeeded by: Jesus Barrera

Associate Justice of the Supreme Court
- In office June 25, 1946 – January 4, 1954
- Appointed by: Manuel Roxas
- Preceded by: Antonio Horilleno
- Succeeded by: Alfonso Felix

Associate Justice of the Court of Appeals
- In office 1938–1946
- Appointed by: Manuel L. Quezon

Solicitor General of the Philippines
- as Attorney General of the Bureau of Justice
- In office January 1, 1921 – June 30, 1921
- Preceded by: Felecisimo R. Feria
- Succeeded by: Antonio Villareal
- as Solicitor General
- In office July 1, 1936 – August 17, 1938
- President: Manuel Quezon
- Preceded by: Serafin P. Hilado
- Succeeded by: Roman Ozaeta

Personal details
- Born: Pedro Tiangco Tuason; September 15, 1884 Balanga, Bataan, Philippines, Spanish East Indies
- Died: June 28, 1961 (aged 76) Manila, Philippines
- Parent(s): Clemente Tuason; Josefa Tiangco
- Education: New Jersey State Normal School; Georgetown University; Yale University
- Occupation: Lawyer

Pedro Tiangco Tuason (September 15, 1884–June 28, 1961) was a prominent Filipino lawyer and government official.

== Early life and education ==
Born in Balanga, Bataan on 15 September 1884 to Clemente Tuason and Josefa Tiangco, Tuason attended the public school in his town and at an escuela de segunda ensenanza. He was sent to study in the United States as a government pensionado, attending the New Jersey State Normal School in Trenton, then the Georgetown University Law School in Washington, D.C., where he graduated with the Bachelor of Laws degree in 1908, and finally the Yale Law School where he took a post graduate course. ("Justices of the Supreme Court", vol.2; pp. 57–61.) His name is sometimes wrongly spelled with the letter "z", such as the small stretch of a street named after him, but court decisions commonly use his original birth spelling.

== Legal career ==
Having passed the bar examinations in 1912, he was appointed Provincial Fiscal of Misamis, Surigao, Agusan (now Agusan del Norte and del Sur), and Ilocos Sur. He became assistant attorney in the Bureau of Justice in 1918 and, in 1921, occupied the Office of the Attorney General in an acting capacity. He again served as an assistant attorney of the Bureau of Justice from 1921 to 1922. From 1922 until 1936, he was successively judge of the Courts of First Instance of Albay, both Camarines Norte and Camarines Sur, Tayabas, Rizal, and Branch I of Manila. ("Justices of the Supreme Court", vol.2; pp. 57–61.) He became the Solicitor General in 1936, serving until 1938 when he was appointed associate justice of the Court of Appeals. In 1946, he was appointed Associate Justice of the Supreme Court, and after retirement he was rehired by the government to serve the Department of Justice for a few years. He died on June 28, 1961.
