= Anacleto Díaz =

Filipino judge

The Honorable Anacleto Díaz y Carbonell
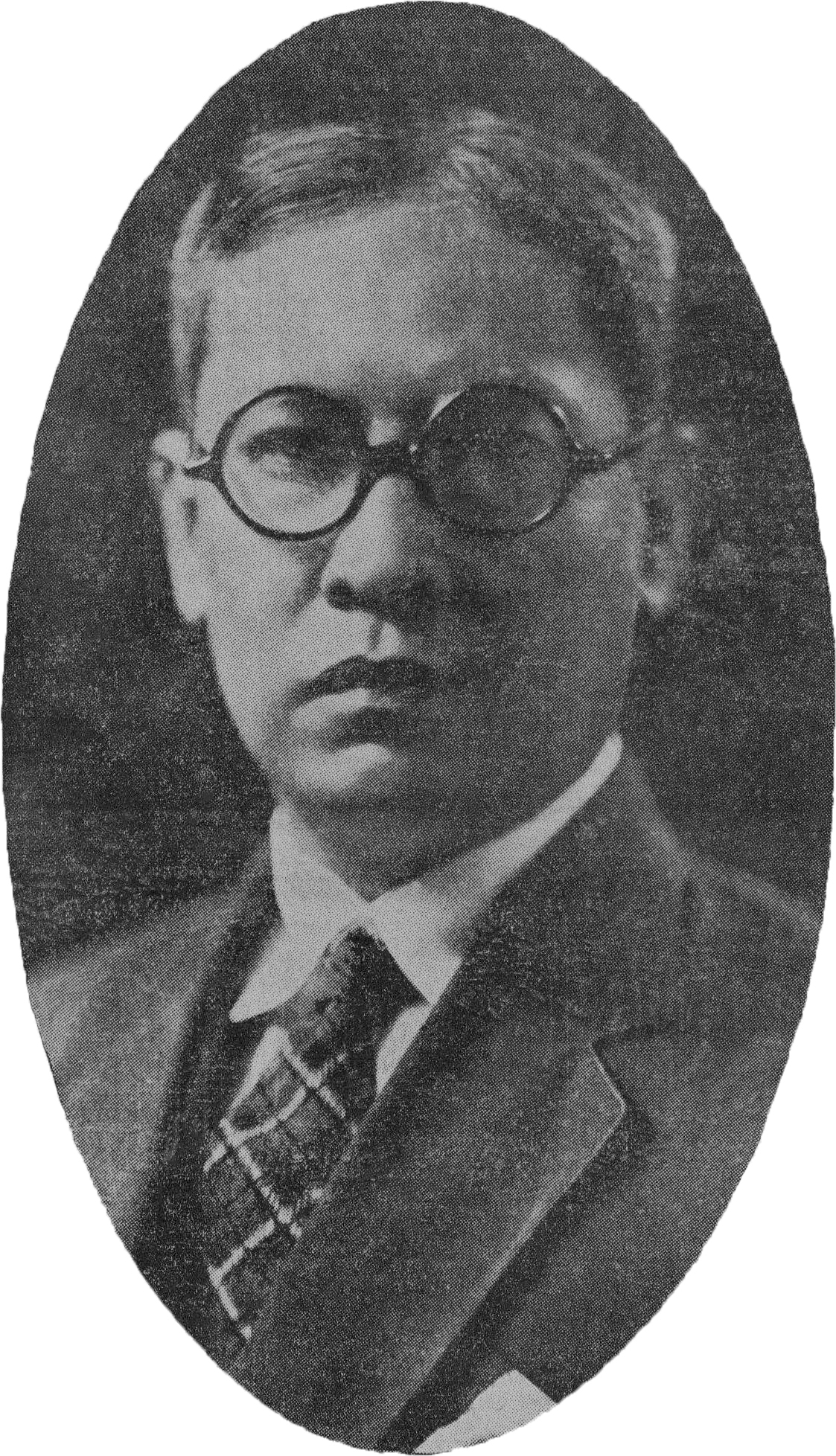
- Anacleto Díaz in 1933

31st Associate Justice of the Philippine Supreme Court
- In office July 20, 1933 – December 19, 1941
- Appointed by: Franklin D. Roosevelt
- Preceded by: Ignacio Villamor
- Succeeded by: José Generoso

Member of the Philippine Assembly from La Union's Second District
- In office 1909–1912
- Preceded by: Francisco Zandueta
- Succeeded by: Florencio Baltazar

Personal details
- Born: November 20, 1878 Aringay, La Union, Captaincy General of the Philippines
- Died: February 10, 1945 (aged 66) City of Greater Manila, Commonwealth of the Philippines
- Education: Escuela de Derecho de Manila

Anacleto Díaz (November 20, 1878 – February 10, 1945) was a Filipino jurist who served as an Associate Justice of the Supreme Court of the Philippines.

== Profile ==
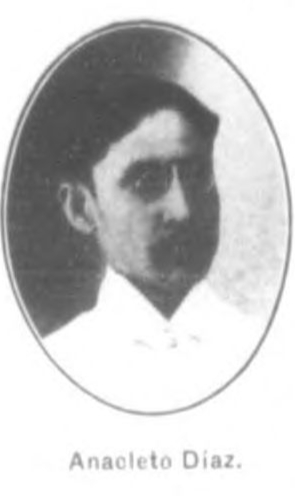
Diaz as member of the Philippine Assembly, c. 1912

Díaz earned his law degree from the Escuela de Derecho de Manila. He was elected as a representative from La Union to the Philippine Assembly in 1910, and served in that capacity until 1912. That year, he was named a provincial fiscal for Ilocos Sur. In 1917, he was appointed city fiscal of Manila. He was later appointed as a trial court judge.

In 1927, while serving as a judge, Díaz was appointed to head a commission tasked with revising the penal code of the Philippines. By 1930, his committee had finished drafting the Revised Penal Code of the Philippines, which remains as the basic penal law in the Philippines.

Díaz was appointed to the Supreme Court of the Philippines by the American President Franklin D. Roosevelt on July 20, 1933. Among his more notable opinions was in People v. Cu Unjieng, 61 Phil. 236 (1935), which was one of the more widely talked-about criminal cases of its day.

Díaz's service in the Court was interrupted by the outbreak of the Second World War. The ensuing Japanese invasion of the Philippines in December 1941 effectively prevented the Supreme Court organized under the Commonwealth government. When the Japanese reestablished the Court in 1942, none of the incumbent members of the old Court were appointed to the new tribunal headed by José Yulo.

== Death ==
Díaz was one of two Supreme Court Justices who were executed by the Imperial Japanese Army during the Battle of Manila in 1945. On February 10, the then-paralyzed Díaz and two of his sons were among 300 men herded by the Japanese army and lined up along the corner of Taft Avenue and Padre Faura Street in Ermita, City of Greater Manila (now part of Manila). Japanese soldiers then opened machine gun fire, killing Díaz and his sons as well as scores of others. Two days later, Diaz's colleague on the Court, Antonio Villa-Real, was murdered by Japanese forces in nearby Pasay.

The area where Díaz was executed would later become part of the Supreme Court compound when the Court relocated to Padre Faura after the war.

== Notes ==
Legal offices
Preceded by Ignacio Villamor	Associate Justice of the Supreme Court of the Philippines; 1933–1941	Succeeded by José Generoso
