= Antonio Villa-Real =

Filipino jurist

The Honorable Antonio O. Villareal
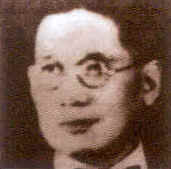

25th Associate Justice of the Philippine Supreme Court
- In office June 26, 1925 – June 5, 1940
- Appointed by: Calvin Coolidge
- Preceded by: Ramon Avanceña
- Succeeded by: Roman Ozaeta

Personal details
- Born: January 17, 1880 Arayat, Pampanga, Captaincy General of the Philippines
- Died: February 12, 1945 (aged 65) Pasay, City of Greater Manila, Commonwealth of the Philippines

Antonio Ochangco Villareal (January 17, 1880 — February 12, 1945) was a Filipino jurist who served as an Associate Justice of the Supreme Court.

== Profile ==
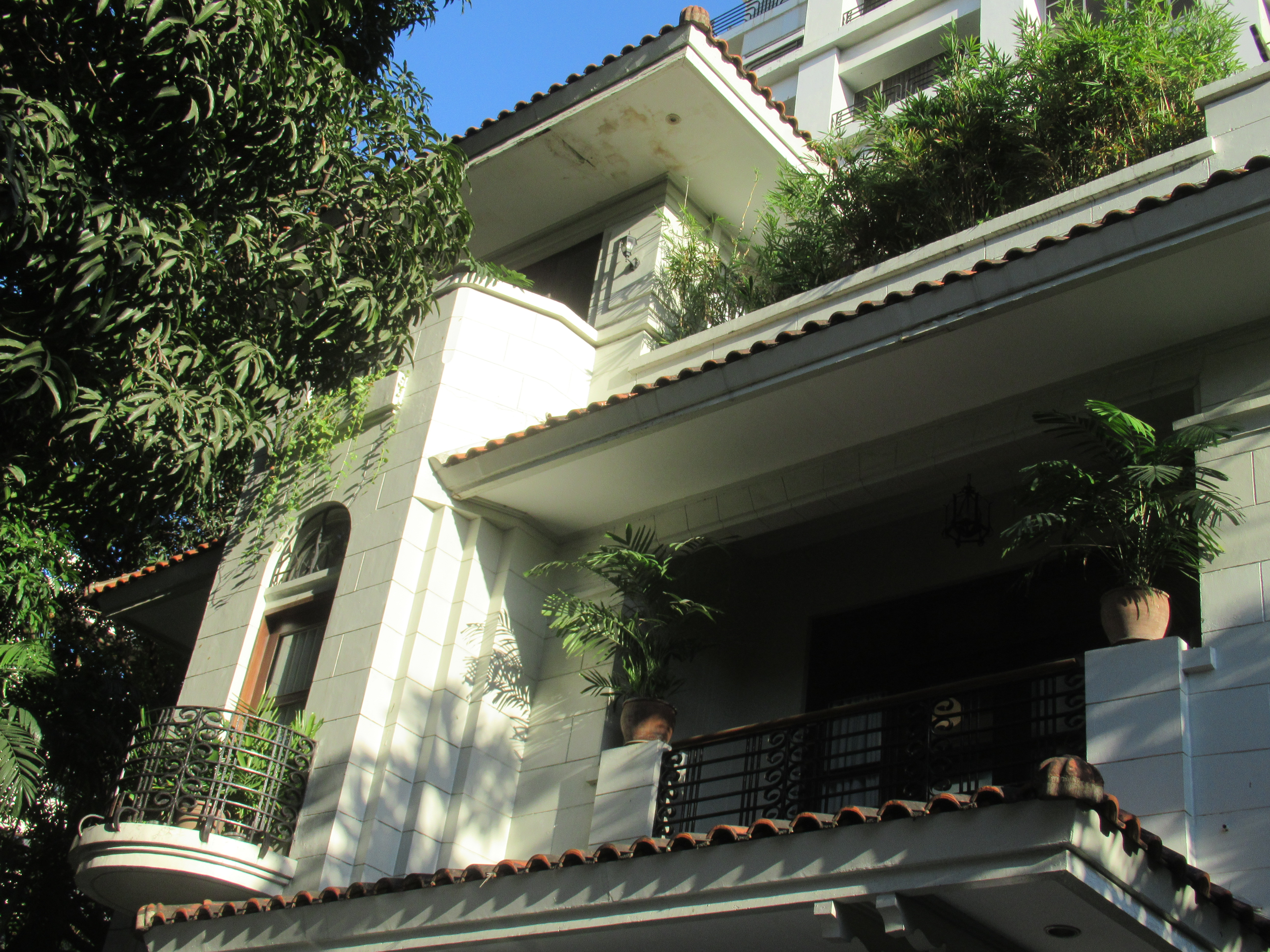
Antonio Villa-Real House

Born in Pampanga, Villa-Real was forced to interrupt his schooling at age 15 in order to work following the death of his father. In 1895, he travelled to Japan and unsuccessfully sought to enlist in the Imperial Japanese Army. After also failing to enlist in the French Foreign Legion in Algeria, Villa-Real finally enrolled in a Tokyo university, where he earned a Bachelor of Arts degree in 1901. He then moved to the United States before finally returning to the Philippines in 1904.

Upon his return to the Philippines, Villa-Real passed the civil service examinations, allowing him to work as an interpreter and translator with the Bureau of Justice. He also studied law, and passed the bar examinations in 1909. Villa-Real continued working at the Bureau of Justice, this time as an attorney, until he was appointed as a trial court judge in 1916. He returned to the Bureau of Justice in 1921, this time as attorney-general from 1921 to 1925.

Attorney-general Villa-Real was appointed to the Supreme Court as an Associate Justice on June 26, 1925, filling the vacancy caused by the elevation of Justice Ramon Avanceña to the Chief Justiceship. Villa-Real served on the Court for the next 15 years, until his retirement on June 5, 1940. Among his more notable opinions were in People v. De Guzman, 51 Phil. 105 (1927), a leading case on rape, as well as the original decision in Ang Tibay v. CIR, which would be reversed after his retirement through a famous decision by Justice Jose P. Laurel.

== Death ==
Villa-real was one of 2 Supreme Court Justices who were executed by the Imperial Japanese Army during the Battle of Manila in 1945. On February 12, Japanese soldiers stormed the Pax Court complex in Pasay, a housing compound owned and resided in by Villa-real. 19 people, including Villa-Real and his wife Paz, were herded into a living room, bound, then made to kneel. A grenade was hurled at the group followed by gunfire, leaving 15 dead, including Villa-Real and his wife. Just two days earlier, Villa-Real's former colleague on the Court, Anacleto Díaz, had been executed by the Japanese along Taft Avenue in Ermita, Manila.

== Notes ==
Legal offices
Preceded by Ramon Avanceña	Associate Justice of the Supreme Court of the Philippines; 1933–1941	Succeeded by Roman Ozaeta
