= Secretary of Justice (Philippines) =

Justice minister of the Philippines

- Kalihim ng Katarungan
- Official seal of the Department of Justice

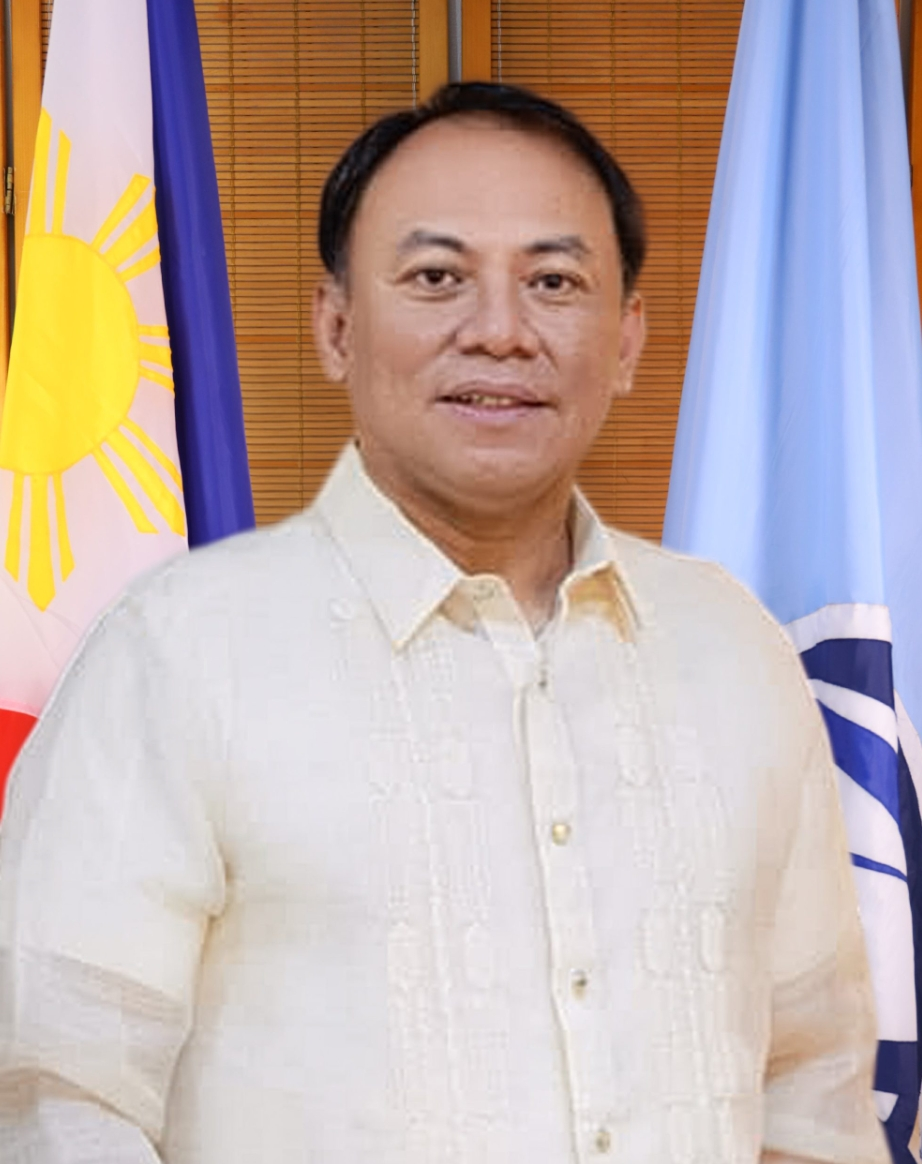
- Incumbent; Usec. Fredderick A. Vida (Acting) since October 10, 2025
- Style: The Honorable
- Member of: Cabinet, Judicial and Bar Council, National Security Council
- Appointer: The president with the consent of the Commission on Appointments
- Term length: No fixed term
- Inaugural holder: Severino de las Alas
- Formation: April 17, 1851 (175 years ago)
- Website: www.doj.gov.ph

The secretary of justice (Filipino: kalihim ng katarungan) is the head of the Department of Justice and is a member of the president's Cabinet.

The position is currently held by its Acting Secretary Usec. Fredderick A. Vida since October 10, 2025 following Jesus Crispin Remulla's appointment as Ombudsman.

== List of secretaries of justice ==
=== Director of Justice (1897) ===
Portrait	Name (Birth–Death)	Took office	Left office	President
	Severino de las Alas	April 24, 1897	November 1, 1897	Emilio Aguinaldo

=== Secretary of Justice (1898–1899) ===
Portrait	Name (Birth–Death)	Took office	Left office	President
	Gregorio S. Araneta (1869–1930)	September 2, 1898	May 7, 1899	Emilio Aguinaldo

=== Attorney General (1899–1901) ===
Portrait	Name (Birth–Death)	Took office	Left office	Military Governor
	Florentino Torres (1869–1930)	May 29, 1899	June 4, 1901	Elwell Stephen Otis
	Florentino Torres (1869–1930)	May 29, 1899	June 4, 1901	Arthur MacArthur Jr.

=== Secretary of Finance and Justice (1901–1917) ===
Portrait	Name (Birth–Death)	Took office	Left office	Governor-General
	Henry Clay Ide (1844–1921)	September 1, 1901	June 30, 1908	William Howard Taft
	Henry Clay Ide (1844–1921)	September 1, 1901	June 30, 1908	Luke Edward Wright
	Henry Clay Ide (1844–1921)	September 1, 1901	June 30, 1908	Henry Clay Ide
	Henry Clay Ide (1844–1921)	September 1, 1901	June 30, 1908	James Francis Smith
	Gregorio S. Araneta (1869–1930)	July 1, 1908	October 30, 1913	James Francis Smith
	Gregorio S. Araneta (1869–1930)	July 1, 1908	October 30, 1913	William Cameron Forbes
	Gregorio S. Araneta (1869–1930)	July 1, 1908	October 30, 1913	Newton W. Gilbert
	Gregorio S. Araneta (1869–1930)	July 1, 1908	October 30, 1913	Francis Burton Harrison
	Victorino Mapa (1855–1927)	October 30, 1913	January 1, 1917	Francis Burton Harrison

=== Secretary of Justice (1917–1935) ===
Portrait	Name (Birth–Death)	Took office	Left office	Governor-General
	Victorino Mapa (1855–1927)	January 1, 1917	June 30, 1920	Francis Burton Harrison
	Quintín Paredes (1884–1973)	July 1, 1920	December 15, 1921	Francis Burton Harrison
	Quintín Paredes (1884–1973)	July 1, 1920	December 15, 1921	Charles Yeater
	Quintín Paredes (1884–1973)	July 1, 1920	December 15, 1921	Leonard Wood
	José Abad Santos (1886–1942)	April 26, 1922	July 17, 1923	Leonard Wood
	Luis Torres	July 18, 1923	August 31, 1928	Leonard Wood
	Luis Torres	July 18, 1923	August 31, 1928	Eugene Allen Gilmore
	Luis Torres	July 18, 1923	August 31, 1928	Henry L. Stimson
	José Abad Santos (1886–1942)	September 1, 1928	June 18, 1932	Henry L. Stimson
	José Abad Santos (1886–1942)	September 1, 1928	June 18, 1932	Eugene Allen Gilmore
	José Abad Santos (1886–1942)	September 1, 1928	June 18, 1932	Dwight F. Davis
	José Abad Santos (1886–1942)	September 1, 1928	June 18, 1932	George C. Butte
	José Abad Santos (1886–1942)	September 1, 1928	June 18, 1932	Theodore Roosevelt Jr.
	Alejandro Reyes (1899–1972)	June 19, 1932	December 31, 1932	Theodore Roosevelt Jr.
	Quirico Abeto	January 1, 1933	July 5, 1934	Theodore Roosevelt Jr.
	Quirico Abeto	January 1, 1933	July 5, 1934	Frank Murphy
	José Yulo (1894–1976)	July 6, 1934	November 15, 1935	Frank Murphy

=== Secretary of Justice (1935–1941) ===
Portrait	Name (Birth–Death)	Took office	Left office	President
	José Yulo (1894–1976)	November 15, 1935	November 15, 1938	Manuel L. Quezon
	José Abad Santos (1886–1942)	December 5, 1938	July 16, 1941	Manuel L. Quezon
	Teófilo Sison (1850–1975)	July 18, 1941	November 27, 1941	Manuel L. Quezon

=== Commissioner of Justice (1942–1943) ===
Portrait	Name (Birth–Death)	Took office	Left office	Chairman of the Philippine Executive Commission
	Jose P. Laurel (1891–1959)	January 26, 1942	December 4, 1942	Jorge B. Vargas
	Teófilo Sison (1850–1975)	December 4, 1942	October 14, 1943	Jorge B. Vargas

=== Minister of Justice (1943–1945) ===
Portrait	Name (Birth–Death)	Took office	Left office	President
	Quintín Paredes (1884–1973)	October 14, 1943	December 25, 1944	Jose P. Laurel

=== Secretary of Justice, Labor and Welfare (1944–1945) ===
Portrait	Name (Birth–Death)	Took office	Left office	President
	Mariano Eraña	August 8, 1944	February 27, 1945	Sergio Osmeña

=== Secretary of Justice (1945–1978) ===
Portrait	Name (Birth–Death)	Took office	Left office	President
	Delfín Jaranilla (1883–1980)	February 27, 1945	December 31, 1945	Sergio Osmeña
	Ramon Quisumbing	January 2, 1946	May 28, 1946	Sergio Osmeña
	Roman Ozaeta (1891–1972)	May 29, 1946	September 17, 1948	Manuel Roxas
	Roman Ozaeta (1891–1972)	May 29, 1946	September 17, 1948	Elpidio Quirino
	Sabino Padilla	September 19, 1948	June 30, 1949	Elpidio Quirino
	Ricardo Nepomuceno	July 1, 1949	July 25, 1950	Elpidio Quirino
	Jose P. Bengzon	August 29, 1950	September 23, 1951	Elpidio Quirino
	Oscar Castelo (1903–1982)	January 1, 1952	August 16, 1953	Elpidio Quirino
	Roberto Gianzon	August 17, 1953	December 30, 1953	Elpidio Quirino
	Pedro Tuason (1884–1961)	January 4, 1954	March 19, 1958	Ramon Magsaysay
	Pedro Tuason (1884–1961)	January 4, 1954	March 19, 1958	Carlos P. Garcia
	Jesus Barrera (1896–1988)	April 18, 1958	June 4, 1959	Carlos P. Garcia
	Enrique Fernandez	June 11, 1959	July 13, 1959	Carlos P. Garcia
	Alejo Mabanag (1886–unknown)	July 14, 1959	December 30, 1961	Carlos P. Garcia
	Jose W. Diokno (1922–1987)	January 2, 1962	May 19, 1962	Diosdado Macapagal
	Juan Liwag (1906–1983)	May 20, 1962	July 7, 1963	Diosdado Macapagal
	Salvador Marino	July 9, 1963	December 30, 1965	Diosdado Macapagal
	José Yulo (1894–1976)	January 1, 1966	August 4, 1967	Ferdinand Marcos
	Claudio Teehankee (1918–1989)	August 5, 1967	December 16, 1968	Ferdinand Marcos
	Juan Ponce Enrile (1924–2025)	December 17, 1968	February 7, 1970	Ferdinand Marcos
	Felix Makasiar (1915–1992)	February 8, 1970	August 1, 1970	Ferdinand Marcos
	Vicente Abad Santos (1916–1993)	August 2, 1970	June 2, 1978	Ferdinand Marcos

=== Minister of Justice (1978–1987) ===
Portrait	Name (Birth–Death)	Took office	Left office	President
	Vicente Abad Santos (1916–1993)	June 2, 1978	January 16, 1979	Ferdinand Marcos
	Catalino Macaraig Jr. (1927–2003)	January 17, 1979	July 22, 1979	Ferdinand Marcos
	Ricardo C. Puno (1923–2018)	July 23, 1979	June 30, 1984	Ferdinand Marcos
	Estelito Mendoza (1930–2025)	June 30, 1984	February 25, 1986	Ferdinand Marcos
	Neptali Gonzales (1923–2001)	February 25, 1986	February 11, 1987	Corazon Aquino

=== Secretary of Justice (from 1987) ===
Portrait	Name (Birth–Death)	Took office	Left office	President
	Neptali Gonzales (1923–2001)	February 11, 1987	March 8, 1987	Corazon Aquino
	Sedfrey Ordoñez (1921–2007)	March 9, 1987	January 2, 1990	Corazon Aquino
	Franklin Drilon (born 1945)	January 4, 1990	July 14, 1991	Corazon Aquino
	Silvestre Bello III (born 1944)	July 15, 1991	February 10, 1992	Corazon Aquino
	Eduardo Montenegro; Acting	February 10, 1992	June 30, 1992	Corazon Aquino
	Franklin Drilon (born 1945)	July 1, 1992	February 2, 1995	Fidel V. Ramos
	Demetrio Demetria	February 3, 1995	May 19, 1995	Fidel V. Ramos
	Teofisto Guingona Jr. (born 1928)	May 20, 1995	January 31, 1998	Fidel V. Ramos
	Silvestre Bello III (born 1944); Acting	February 1, 1998	June 30, 1998	Fidel V. Ramos
	Serafin R. Cuevas (1928–2014)	July 1, 1998	February 15, 2000	Joseph Estrada
	Artemio Tuquero	February 16, 2000	January 23, 2001	Joseph Estrada
	Artemio Tuquero	February 16, 2000	January 23, 2001	Gloria Macapagal Arroyo
	Hernando Perez (born 1939)	January 24, 2001	November 26, 2002	Gloria Macapagal Arroyo
	Merceditas Gutierrez (born 1948)	November 27, 2002	January 15, 2003	Gloria Macapagal Arroyo
	Simeon Datumanong (1935–2017)	January 16, 2003	December 23, 2003	Gloria Macapagal Arroyo
	Merceditas Gutierrez (born 1948)	December 24, 2003	August 31, 2004	Gloria Macapagal Arroyo
	Raul M. Gonzalez (1930–2014)	September 1, 2004	September 2, 2007	Gloria Macapagal Arroyo
	Agnes Devanadera (born 1950); Acting	September 3, 2007	November 15, 2007	Gloria Macapagal Arroyo
	Raul M. Gonzalez (Note: Raul M. Gonzalez served in an acting capacity from November 16, 2007 until June 4, 2008.) (1930–2014)	November 16, 2007	June 4, 2008	Gloria Macapagal Arroyo
	Raul M. Gonzalez (1930–2014)	June 4, 2008	January 11, 2010	Gloria Macapagal Arroyo
	Agnes Devanadera (born 1950); Acting	January 12, 2010	March 8, 2010	Gloria Macapagal Arroyo
	Alberto Agra (born 1963); Acting	March 10, 2010	June 30, 2010	Gloria Macapagal Arroyo
	Leila de Lima (born 1959)	June 30, 2010	October 12, 2015	Benigno Aquino III
	Alfredo Benjamin Caguioa (born 1959); Interim	October 12, 2015	January 21, 2016	Benigno Aquino III
	Emmanuel Caparas; Interim	January 22, 2016	June 30, 2016	Benigno Aquino III
	Vitaliano Aguirre II (born 1946)	June 30, 2016	April 5, 2018	Rodrigo Duterte
	Menardo Guevarra (born 1954)	April 5, 2018	June 30, 2022	Rodrigo Duterte
	Jesus Crispin Remulla (born 1961)	June 30, 2022	October 9, 2025	Bongbong Marcos
	Fredderick Vida (Acting)	October 10, 2025	Incumbent	Bongbong Marcos

== See also ==
- Justice ministry
- Politics of the Philippines
