= Asuncion A. Perez =

Filipino government official

Asunción Arriola-Pérez (August 15, 1895 – 1967) was a Filipino government official and the first female cabinet member who served as a Social Welfare Administrator under four Philippine presidents. She became a social worker for the Red Cross in 1924 and held such positions as Executive Secretary of the Associated Charities of Manila and the Red Cross. She and her husband were arrested and detained in Fort Santiago in 1944. Her husband, Cirilo Barcial Perez of Santa Maria, Bulacan was later executed by the Japanese and buried at the 29 Martyrs of World War 2 Memorial at the Manila North Cemetery. She was a former administrator of Social Welfare from 1948 to 1953. She was also one of the original board of trustees of the Philippine Rural Reconstruction Movement.

In 1954 she founded an orphanage, the Children's Garden of the Philippines. She also served as the president of Wesleyan University Philippines from 1954 to 1967.
