= Roman Ozaeta =

Filipino lawyer and judge (1891–1972)

The Honourable Roman A. Ozaeta
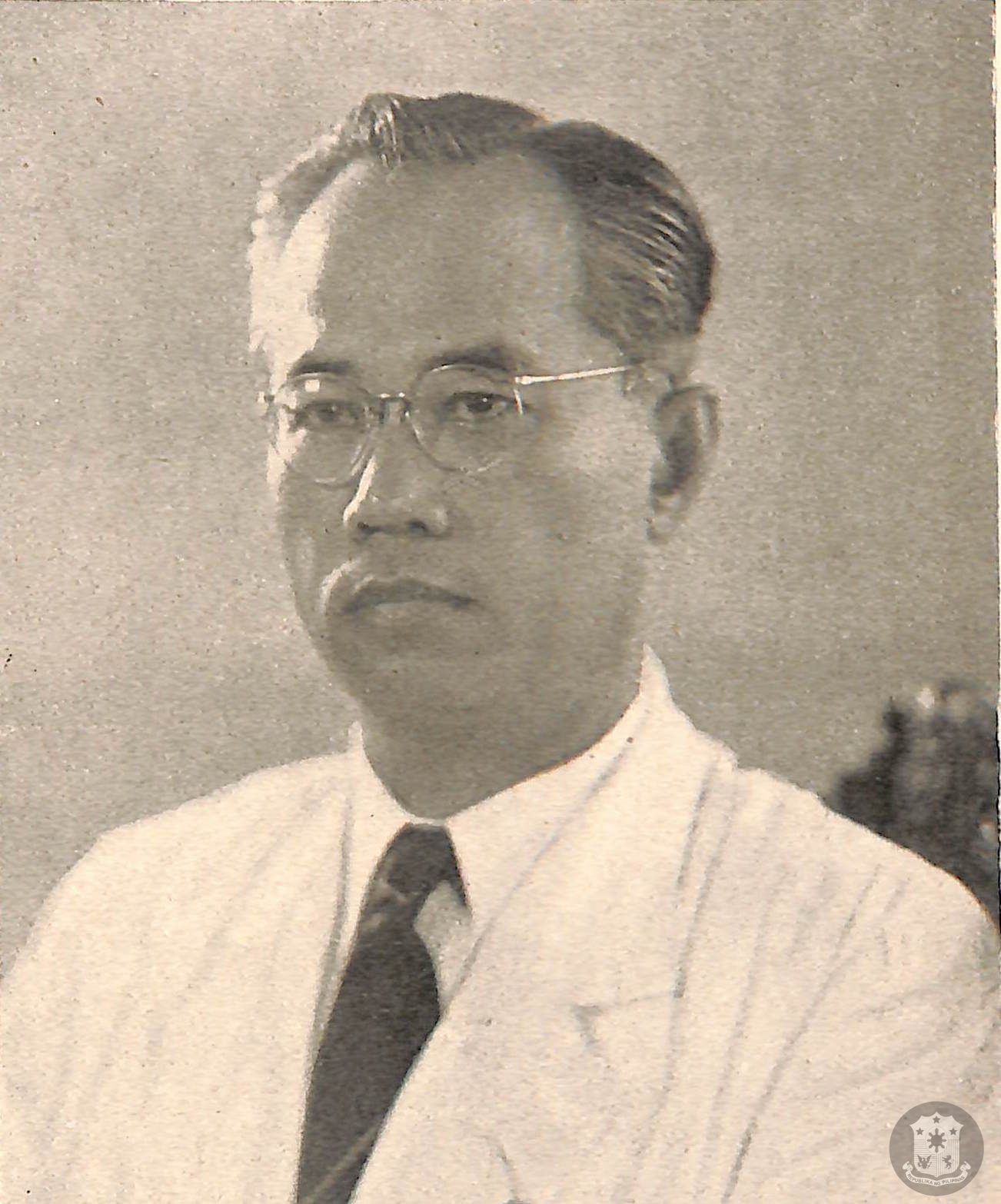
- Photograph from the Blue Book: First Anniversary of the Republic of the Philippines, published 1947

37th Associate Justice of the Supreme Court of the Philippines
- In office June 24, 1941 – May 29, 1946
- Appointed by: Manuel Quezon
- Preceded by: Pedro Concepcion
- Succeeded by: Pedro Tuason
- In office September 19, 1948 – February 28, 1950
- Appointed by: Elpidio Quirino
- Preceded by: Emilio Hilado
- Succeeded by: Roberto Concepcion

Secretary of Justice
- In office May 29, 1946 – September 17, 1948
- Appointed by: Manuel Roxas
- Preceded by: Ramon Quisumbing
- Succeeded by: Sabino Patiala

Personal details
- Born: Roman Ozaeta y Atienza; 28 February 1891 San Jose, Batangas, Captaincy General of the Philippines
- Died: 1 May 1972 (aged 81)

Roman Atienza Ozaeta (born Román Ozaeta y Atienza; 28 February 1891 – 1 May 1972) was a Filipino lawyer and judge who served as Associate Justice of the Supreme Court of the Philippines from 24 June 1941 to 28 June 1946, and served as 9th Senior Associate Justice of the Supreme Court of the Philippines from 19 September 1948 to 28 February 1950. Ozaeta served non-consequtively as 21st Secretary of Justice from 29 May 1946 to 17 September 1948. He also served as Solicitor General from 17 August 1938 to 30 June 1940, under the Quezon presidency.
