= Presidency of Fidel V. Ramos =

Presidency of the Philippines, 1992–1998

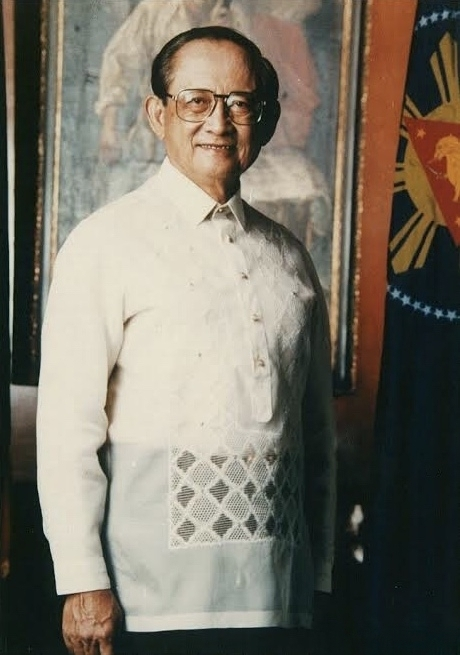
- Official portrait, 1995
- Presidency of Fidel Ramos; June 30, 1992 – June 30, 1998
- President: Fidel V. Ramos
- Vice President: Joseph Estrada
- Cabinet: See list
- Party: Lakas
- Election: 1992
- Seat: Malacañang Palace, Manila
- Seal of the President of the Philippines (1986–1998)

Fidel V. Ramos began his presidency at noon on June 30, 1992, following his inauguration as the 11th president of the Philippines, succeeding Corazon Aquino. He is the first Protestant president of the country, and the first Christian Democrat to be elected, being the founder of Lakas–National Union of Christian Democrats (Lakas–NUCD). He was included as one of the most influential leaders and the unofficial spokesman of liberal democracy in Sia.

The first few years of Ramos' administration (1993–1996) were characterized by economic boom, technological development, political stability and efficient delivery of basic needs to the people. Under Ramos' president, the country Gross National Product averaged 6 percent annually. Ramos pushed for the deregulation of keys industries and the liberalization of the economy; he encouraged the privateization of public entities to include the modernization of public infrastructure through an expanded Build-Operate-Transfer law. This marked the beginning of the presence of Neoliberal ideology in the Philippines.

Ramos forged a peace agreement with military rebels and the secessionist Moro National Liberation Front. In 1993, he started a power that crippled Filipino homes and industries for 2 years. He implemented a comprehensive Social Reform Agenda to address poverty.

== 1992 presidential election ==
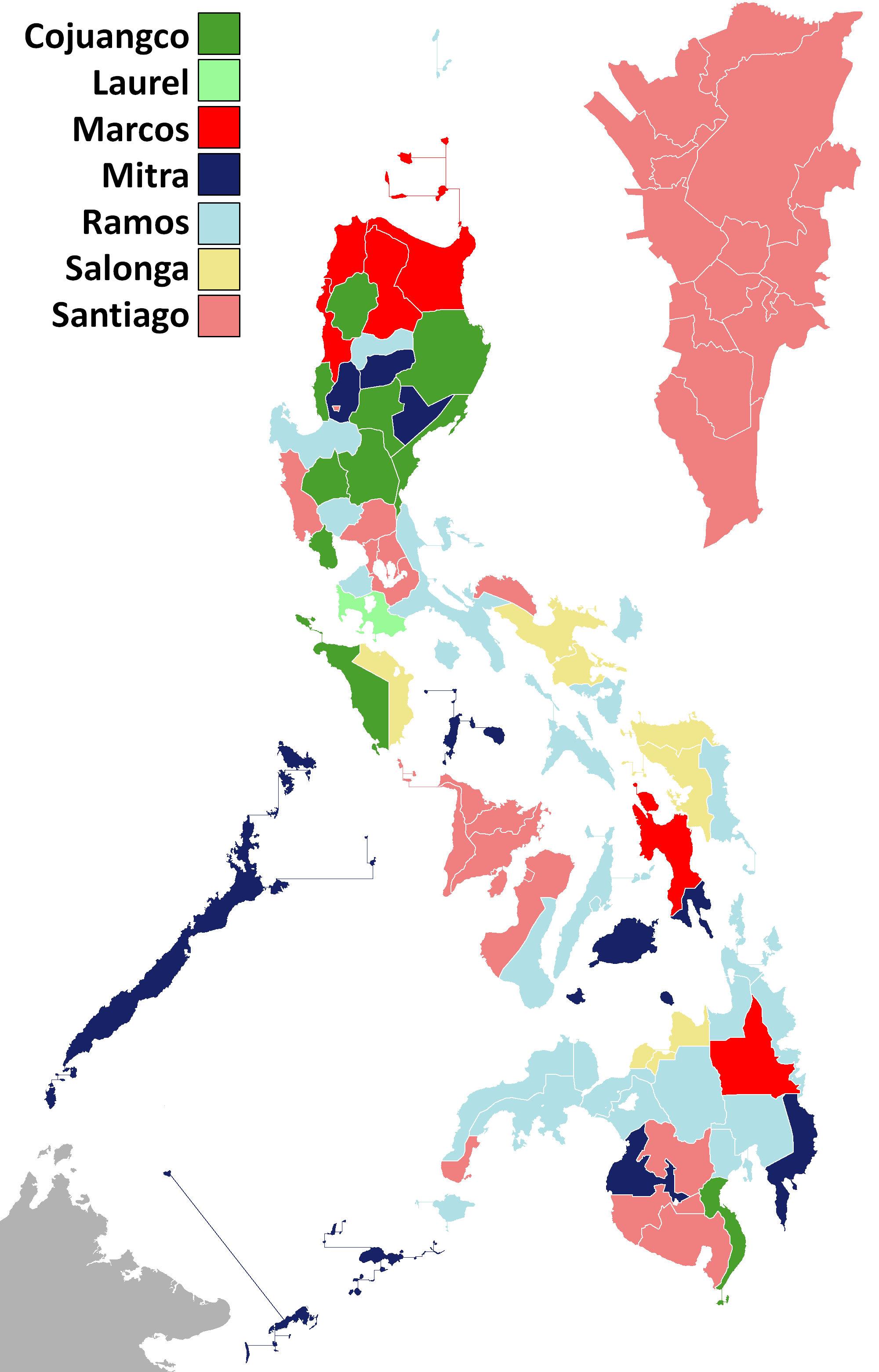
Results of the 1992 Philippine presidential election

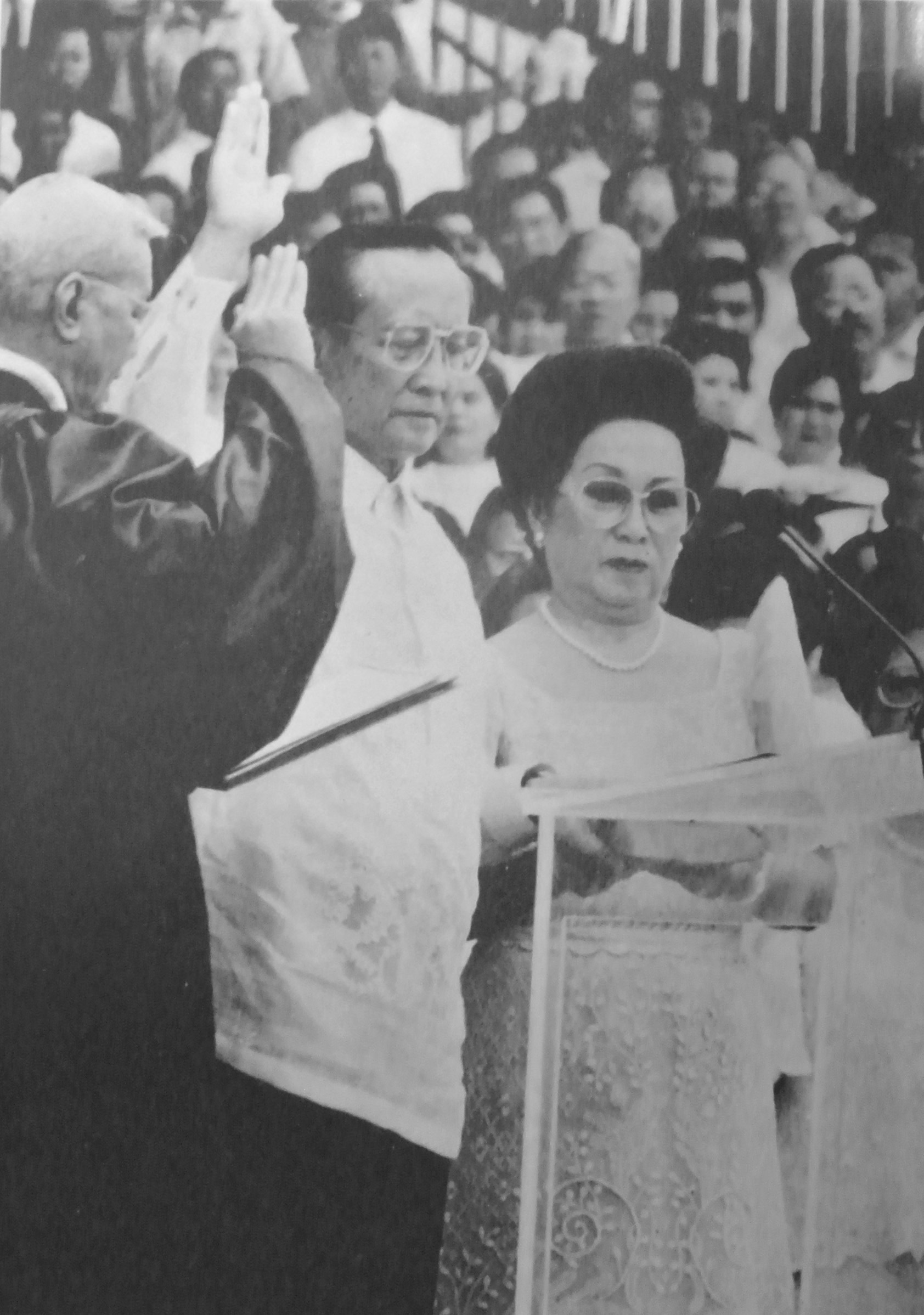
Former Secretary of National Defense Fidel V. Ramos taking his oath of office as the 12th president of the Philippines on June 30, 1992.

In the 1992 presidential election, retired general Fidel Ramos of Lakas–NUCD narrowly defeated populist candidate Miriam Defensor Santiago of the People's Reform Party. Ramos also got the lowest plurality in the Philippine electoral history, and beat the previous election for the closest margin of victory, percentage-wise (this record would later be beaten by the 2004 election).

== Administration and cabinet ==
Office	Name	Term
President	Fidel V. Ramos	June 30, 1992 – June 30, 1998
Vice-President	Joseph Ejercito Estrada	June 30, 1992 – June 30, 1998
Executive Secretary	Peter Garrucho	July 1, 1992 – September 13, 1992
Executive Secretary	Edelmiro Amante	September 14, 1992 – June 30, 1993
Executive Secretary	Teofisto Guingona, Jr.	July 6, 1993 – May 19, 1995
Executive Secretary	Ruben Torres	May 20, 1995 – January 8, 1998
Executive Secretary	Alexander Aguirre	January 9, 1998 – June 30, 1998
Secretary of Agrarian Reform	Ernesto Garilao	July 1, 1992 – June 30, 1998
Secretary of Agriculture	Roberto Sebastian	July 1, 1992 – January 31, 1996
Secretary of Agriculture	Salvador Escudero III	February 1, 1996 – June 30, 1998
Secretary of Budget and Management	Salvador Enriquez, Jr.	June 30, 1992 – February 1, 1998
Secretary of Budget and Management	Emilia Boncodin	February 1, 1998 – June 30, 1998
Secretary of Education, Culture and Sports	Armand Fabella	July 1, 1992 – July 6, 1994
Secretary of Education, Culture and Sports	Ricardo Gloria	July 7, 1994 – December 1997
Secretary of Education, Culture and Sports	Erlinda Pefianco	February 2, 1998 – June 30, 1998
Secretary of Energy	Rufino Bomasang	June 30, 1992 – January 11, 1993
Secretary of Energy	Delfin Lazaro	January 12, 1993 – September 19, 1994
Secretary of Energy	Francisco Viray	September 20, 1994 – June 30, 1998
Secretary of Environment and Natural Resources	Ricardo M. Umali (Acting)	July 1, 1992 – August 31, 1992
Secretary of Environment and Natural Resources	Angel Alcala	September 8, 1992 – June 30, 1995
Secretary of Environment and Natural Resources	Victor Ramos	July 1, 1995 – June 30, 1998
Secretary of Finance	Ramon del Rosario, Jr.	July 1, 1992 – June 1, 1993
Secretary of Finance	Ernest Leung	June 2, 1993 – January 31, 1994
Secretary of Finance	Roberto de Ocampo	February 1, 1994 – March 30, 1998
Secretary of Finance	Salvador Enriquez	April 1, 1998 – June 30, 1998
Secretary of Foreign Affairs	Roberto Romulo	July 1, 1992 – April 1995
Secretary of Foreign Affairs	Domingo Siazon, Jr.	May 1995 – June 30, 1998
Secretary of Health	Juan Flavier	July 1, 1992 – January 30, 1995
Secretary of Health	Jaime Galvez Tan	January 30, 1995 – July 5, 1995
Secretary of Health	Hilarion Ramiro, Jr.	July 10, 1995 – March 22, 1996
Secretary of Health	Carmencita Reodica	April 8, 1996 – June 29, 1998
Secretary of the Interior and Local Government	Rafael Alunan III	July 1, 1992 – April 15, 1996
Secretary of the Interior and Local Government	Robert Barbers	April 16, 1996 – February 3, 1998
Secretary of the Interior and Local Government	Epimaco Velasco	February 4, 1998 – May 30, 1998
Secretary of the Interior and Local Government	Nelson Collantes	June 1, 1998 – June 30, 1998
Secretary of Justice	Franklin Drilon	July 1, 1992 – February 1995
Secretary of Justice	Demetrio Demetria	February 1995 – May 1995
Secretary of Justice	Teofisto Guingona, Jr.	May 1995 – February 1998
Secretary of Justice	Silvestre Bello III	February 1998 – June 30, 1998
Secretary of Labor and Employment	Nieves Confesor	June 30, 1992 – June 30, 1995
Secretary of Labor and Employment	Jose Brillantes	July 1, 1995 – January 16, 1996
Secretary of Labor and Employment	Leonardo Quisumbing	January 16, 1996 – January 26, 1998
Secretary of Labor and Employment	Cresenciano Trajano	January 26, 1998 – June 30, 1998
Secretary of National Defense	Renato de Villa	June 30, 1992 – September 15, 1997
Secretary of National Defense	Fortunato Abat	September 16, 1997 – June 30, 1998
Secretary of Public Works and Highways	Jose de Jesus	June 30, 1992 – March 1, 1993
Secretary of Public Works and Highways	Eduardo Mir	March 1, 1993 – June 1, 1993
Secretary of Public Works and Highways	Gregorio Vigilar	June 1, 1993 – June 30, 1998
Secretary of Science and Technology	Ricardo Gloria	July 1, 1992 – July 6, 1994
Secretary of Science and Technology	William Padolina	July 7, 1994 – June 30, 1998
Secretary of Social Welfare and Development	Corazon Alma de Leon	July 1, 1992 – June 1995
Secretary of Social Welfare and Development	Lilian Laigo	1995 – June 30, 1998
Secretary of Tourism	Narzalina Lim	June 30, 1992 – September 10, 1992
Secretary of Tourism	Vicente Carlos	September 11, 1992 – July 3, 1995
Secretary of Tourism	Eduardo Pilapil	July 4, 1995 – March 29, 1996
Secretary of Tourism	Evelyn Pantig	March 29, 1996 – April 7, 1996
Secretary of Tourism	Guillermina Gabor	April 8, 1996 – June 30, 1998
Secretary of Trade and Industry	Rizalino Navarro	July 1, 1992 – 1996
Secretary of Trade and Industry	Cesar Bautista	1996 – June 30, 1998
Secretary of Transportation and Communications	Jesus Garcia	July 1, 1992 – April 1, 1996
Secretary of Transportation and Communications	Amado Lagdameo, Jr.	April 1, 1996 – April 16, 1997
Secretary of Transportation and Communications	Arturo Enrile	April 16, 1997 – January 14, 1998
Secretary of Transportation and Communications	Josefina Lichauco	January 15, 1998 – June 30, 1998
Presidential Spokesperson	Rodolfo Reyes	July 1, 1992 – May 10, 1993
Presidential Spokesperson	Jesus Sison	May 11, 1993 – June 20, 1995
Presidential Spokesperson	Hector Villanueva	June 21, 1995 – June 29, 1998
Chief of the Presidential Management Staff	Ma. Leonora Vasquez-de Jesus, Ph.D.	1992–1998
Cabinet Secretary	Ma. Leonora Vasquez-de Jesus, Ph.D.	1992–1998
Director-General of the National Economic and Development Authority	Cielito Habito	July 1, 1992 – June 30, 1998
Chairperson of the Commission on Higher Education	Ricardo Gloria	May 18, 1994 – June 30, 1995
Chairperson of the Commission on Higher Education	Angel Alcala	July 1, 1995 – June 30, 1998
Solicitor General	Ramon Desuasido	June 30, 1992 – July 5, 1992
Solicitor General	Eduardo Montenegro	July 6, 1992 – August 10, 1992
Solicitor General	Raul Goco	August 11, 1992 – September 22, 1996
Solicitor General	Silvestre Bello III	September 23, 1996 – February 3, 1998
Solicitor General	Romeo de la Cruz	February 4, 1998 – June 8, 1998
Solicitor General	Silvestre Bello III	June 9, 1998 – June 30, 1998
Chairman of the Metropolitan Manila Authority	Ismael Mathay Jr.	July 1, 1992 – 1994
Chairman of the Metropolitan Manila Authority	Prospero Oreta	1994 – March 1, 1995
Chairman of the Metropolitan Manila Development Authority	Prospero Oreta	March 1, 1995 – June 30, 1998
National Security Adviser	Jose Almonte	July 1, 1992 – June 30, 1998
Presidential Adviser on the Peace Process	Haydee Yorac	July 1, 1992 – August 9, 1993
Presidential Adviser on the Peace Process	Oscar Santos	August 20, 1993 – March 22, 1994
Presidential Adviser on the Peace Process	Manuel Yan	March 22, 1994 – June 30, 1998
Chairman and Administrator of the Subic Bay Metropolitan Authority	Richard J. Gordon	July 1, 1992 – June 30, 1998
Chairman of the National Centennial Commission	Salvador H. Laurel	1993–1998

== Judicial appointments ==
Ramos appointed the following to the Supreme Court of the Philippines:

1. Justice Jose Melo - August 10, 1992
2. Justice Jose C. Campos, Jr. - September 3, 1992
3. Justice Camilo D. Quiason - February 1, 1993
4. Justice Reynato Puno - June 28, 1993
5. Justice Jose C. Vitug - June 28, 1993
6. Justice Santiago M. Kapunan - January 5, 1994
7. Justice Vicente V. Mendoza - June 7, 1994
8. Justice Ricardo J. Francisco - January 5, 1995
9. Justice Regino C. Hermosisima, Jr. - January 10, 1995
10. Justice Artemio Panganiban - October 5, 1995
11. Justice Justo P. Torres, Jr. - March 11, 1996
12. Justice Antonio M. Martinez - November 10, 1997
13. Justice Leonardo Quisumbing - January 15, 1998
14. Justice Fidel P. Purisima - January 20, 1998 (his last SC justice appointee)

== Major issues of presidency ==
=== Speeches ===
Ramos during his Sixth State of the Nation Address on July 28, 1997

- Inaugural Address, (June 30, 1992)
- First State of the Nation Address, (July 27, 1992)
- Second State of the Nation Address, (July 26, 1993)
- Third State of the Nation Address, (July 25, 1994)
- Fourth State of the Nation Address, (July 24, 1995)
- Fifth State of the Nation Address, (July 22, 1996)
- Sixth State of the Nation Address, (July 28, 1997)

=== Major acts and legislation ===
- First RP-US Visiting Forces Agreement
- Republic Act No. 7653 - The New Central Bank Act
- Republic Act No. 7638 - Charter of the Department of Energy
- Republic Act No. 7648 - Electric Power Crisis Act
- Republic Act No. 7832 - Anti-electricity and Electric Transmission Lines/Materials Pilferage Act of 1994
- Republic Act No. 7881 – Amended certain provisions of RA 6657 and exempted fishponds and prawns from the coverage of CARP
- Republic Act No. 7905 – Strengthened the implementation of the CARP
- Republic Act No. 8179 - An act further liberalizing foreign investments, amending for the purpose Republic Act No. 7042, and for other purposes
- Republic Act No. 8293 - The Intellectual Property Code of the Philippines (Philippine copyright law)
- Republic Act No. 8435 – (Agriculture and Fisheries Modernization Act) Plugged the legal loopholes in land use conversion
- Republic Act No. 8532 – (Agrarian Reform Fund Bill) Provided an additional Php50 billion for CARP and extended its implementation for another 10 years

== Pardons ==
As president, Ramos issued pardons to the following:

- Actor and future senator Robin Padilla (1998) - convicted for illegal possession of firearms.

== Domestic policies ==
=== Economy ===
Ramos embarked on an ambitious development plan dubbed "Philippines 2000". Under the plan, several industries critical to economic development were privatized or deregularized, such as electricity, telecommunications, banking, domestic shipping, airline, and oil. The taxation system was reformed, and external debt was brought to more manageable levels by debt restructuring and sensible fiscal management. By 1996, the country's GNP and GDP were growing at a rate of 7.2 percent and 5.2 percent respectively. The annual inflation rate had dropped to 5.9 percent from its high of 9.1 percent in 1995. By the late 1990s, the Philippines' economic growth gained favorable comparisons with other Asian countries such as Taiwan, Thailand, South Korea, and Malaysia.

The Philippine economy took a sharp downturn during the 1997 Asian financial crisis. Its fiscal deficit in 1998 reached P49.981 billion from a surplus of P1.564 billion in 1997. The peso depreciated (fell in value) to P40.89 per U.S. dollar from its previous rate of P29.47 to a dollar. The annual growth rate of the GNP fell to 0.1 percent in 1998 from 5.3 percent in 1997. Despite these setbacks, the Philippine economy fared better than that of some of its Asian neighbors, and other nations praised the Ramos administration for its "good housekeeping."

==== Philippines 2000 ====
During his administration, Ramos began implementing economic reforms intended to open up the once-closed national economy, encourage private enterprise, invite more foreign and domestic investment, and reduce widespread corruption. Ramos was also known as the most-traveled Philippine president compared to his predecessors with numerous foreign trips abroad, generating about US$20 billion worth of foreign investments to the Philippines. To ensure a positive financial outlook on the Philippines, Ramos led the 4th Asia-Pacific Economic Cooperation Leaders' Summit in the Philippines in November 1996. He also instituted reforms in the tax system which includes a forced increase on VAT (E-VAT law) from 4% to 10% mandated by World Bank and the International Monetary Fund.

Under Ramos' administration, the Philippines experienced economic growth and stability. Ramos' visions of "Philippines 2000" led the country into a newly industrialized country in the world and the "Tiger Cub Economy in Asia". Ramos ended the government's monopoly over the skies and opened aviation to new players.

=== Power crisis ===
When Ramos was elected in May 1992, the Philippines had been experiencing widespread rotating power outages, known as "brownouts", for nearly a year; this happened suddenly when growing customer demand exceeded the reliable supply of electricity, which was mostly provided by the government-owned Napocor. It had been caused by the age and condition of the existing power plants, as well as the long-term lack of continuing investment in the energy sector. During his State of the Nation address on July 27, 1992, he requested that the Congress enact a law that would create an Energy Department to plan and manage the Philippines' energy sector. Congress not only created the Department of Energy, but gave the president special emergency powers to resolve the power crisis. Using those powers, Ramos issued licenses to independent power producers (IPP) to provide additional power plants within 24 months. Ramos issued supply contracts that guaranteed the government would buy whatever power the IPPs produced under the contract; the contracted prices were denominated in U.S. dollars to entice foreign investment in local power plants. Following the 1997 Asian financial crisis however, this structure became a problem, as the Philippine peso lost half of its value, and the local price for the contracted electricity essentially doubled. This resulted in the Philippine price of electricity becoming the second-highest in Asia, after Japan.

The country was already considered risky by investors due to previous coup attempts by military adventurists led by Gregorio Honasan, during the term of President Aquino; the almost daily brownouts lasting 4–12 hours also developed then. The perceived political instability and the reduced power supply severely limited investments and modernization in the country. During Ramos' term, the Philippines became a pioneer in the use of Build-Operate-Transfer (BOT) schemes to spur development, where, with limited government financial capability to do such, private investors are invited to build certain government projects (i.e. tollways, power plants, railways, etc.), operate them for a set period of time, and then transfer ownership to the government. There was little literature or previous experience with such schemes at the time; with the later unfavorable changes in the exchange rates and the business environment, some charge that these contracts put a large and undue amount of risk on the government and consumers.

=== Death penalty ===
While campaigning for the presidency, Ramos declared his support for reinstating the death penalty. Capital punishment was abolished for all crimes in 1987, making the Philippines the first Asian country to do so. In 1996, Ramos signed a bill that returned capital punishment with the electric chair (method used from 1923 to 1976, making Philippines the only country to do so outside U.S.) "until the gas chamber could be installed". However, because the previously used chair was destroyed earlier, no one was electrocuted nor gassed. The Philippines adopted the lethal injection; after his presidency, some people were put to death by this means, until the death penalty was abolished again in 2006.

=== Peace with separatists ===
Ramos, a military general himself, made peace with the rebel panels. He was instrumental in the signing of the final peace agreement between the government and the Moro National Liberation Front (MNLF) led by Nur Misuari in 1996. He also ordered the resumption of peace negotiations with the Moro Islamic Liberation Front (MILF) led by Salamat Hashim and the Communist Party of the Philippines-National Democratic Front, which operates the New People's Army, led by Jose Maria Sison.

Although he battled Communist rebels as a young lieutenant in the 1950s, Ramos made a bold move when he signed into law Republic Act 7636, which repealed the Anti-Subversion Law. With its repeal, membership in the once-outlawed Communist Party of the Philippines became legal.

=== Agrarian reform ===
The Ramos administration speeded the implementation of the Comprehensive Agrarian Reform Program (CARP) of former President Corazon Aquino in order to meet the ten-year time frame. However, there were constraints such as the need to firm up the database and geographic focus, generate funding support, strengthen inter-agency cooperation, and mobilize implementation partners, like the non-government organizations, local governments, and the business community. In 1992, the government acquired and distributed 382 hectares of land with nearly a quarter of a million farmer-beneficiaries. This constituted 41% of all land titles distributed by the Department of Agrarian Reform (DAR) during the last thirty years. But by the end of 1996, the DAR had distributed only 58.25% of the total area it was supposed to cover. From January to December 1997, the DAR distributed 206,612 hectares. That year, since 1987, the DAR had distributed a total of 2.66 million hectares which benefited almost 1.8 million tenant-farmers.

One major problem that the Ramos administration faced was the lack of funds to support and implement the program. The ₱50 million, allotted by R.A. No. 6657 to finance the CARP from 1988 to 1998, was no longer sufficient to support the program. To address this problem, Ramos signed R.A. No. 8532 to amend the Comprehensive Agrarian Reform Law (CARL) which further strengthened the CARP by extending the program to another ten years. Ramos signed this law on February 23, 1998 - a few months before the end of his term.

=== Charter change ===
Among the proposed changes in the constitution included a shift to a parliamentary system and the lifting of term limits of public officials. Ramos argued that the changes will bring more accountability, continuity and responsibility to the "gridlock" prone Philippine version of presidential bicameral system. Some politically active religious groups, opposition politicians, business tycoons and left wing organizations opposed the Charter change process that was supposed to lead to a national referendum. Critics argued that the proposed constitutional changes for one would benefit the incumbent which during that time was Ramos. On September 21, 1997, a church organized rally brought in an estimated half a million people to Rizal Park.

Furthermore, on September 23, 1997, charter change advocates suffered a setback when the Supreme Court, under Chief Justice Andres Narvasa, narrowly dismissed a petition filed by the People's Initiative for Reform, Modernization and Action (PIRMA) that sought to amend the Constitution through a signature campaign or "People's Initiative". The Supreme Court dismissed the petition on the grounds that the People's Initiative mode does not have enough enabling law for the proposed revisions or amendments in the 1987 constitution. Had the petition been successful, a national plebiscite would have been held for proposed changes.

== Foreign policies ==
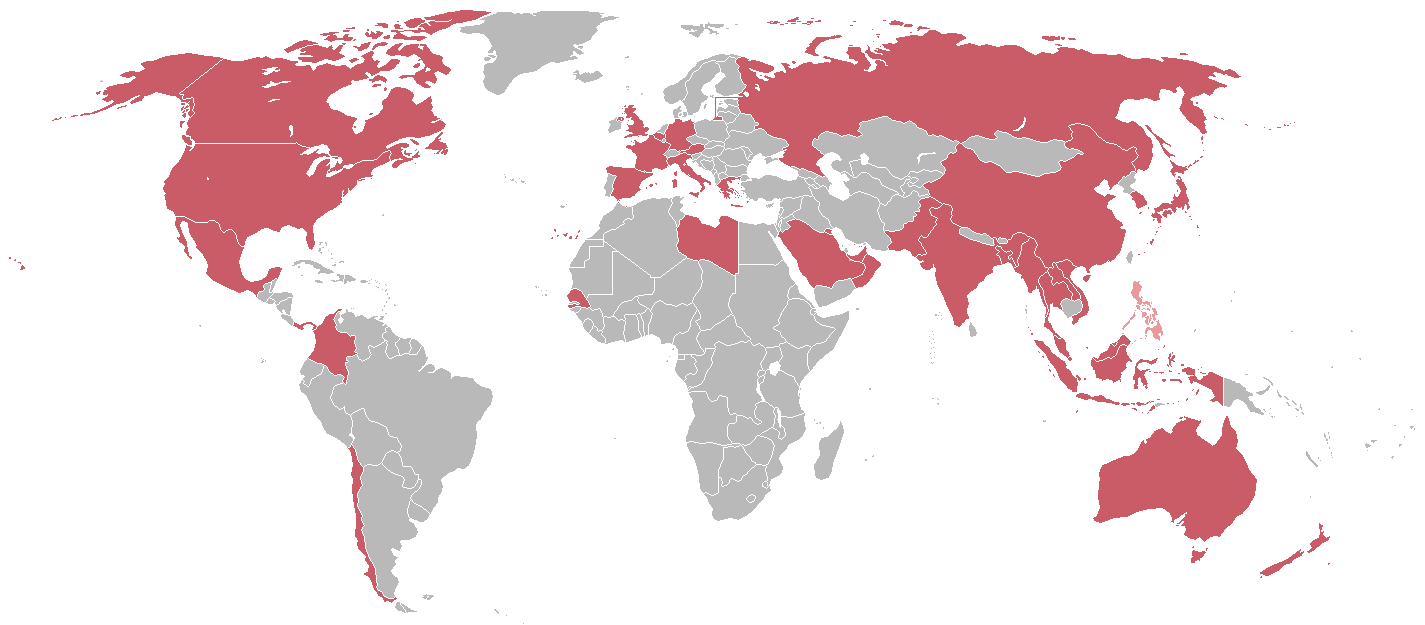
International trips made by Ramos as president

The Ramos administration from June 1992 to June 1998 defined the four core priorities of Philippine foreign policy namely: the enhancement of national security, promotion of economic diplomacy, protection of overseas Filipino workers and Filipino nationals abroad, and the projection of a good image of the country abroad.

Ramos boosted foreign trade, investments and official development assistance to the Philippines through his state visits and summit meetings. In 1996, the Philippines successfully hosted the APEC Leaders' Summit, which resulted in the Manila Action Plan for APEC 1996 (MAPA '96).

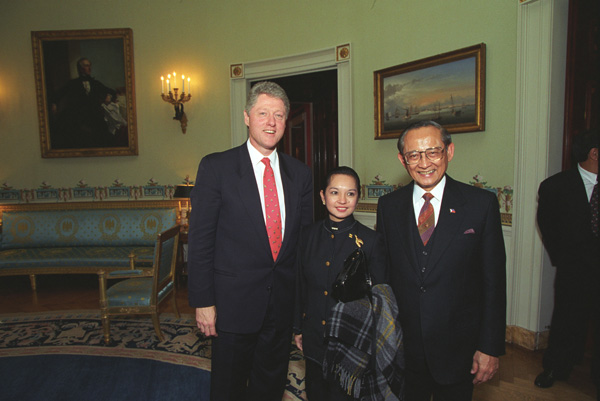
U.S. President Bill Clinton with Philippine President Fidel V. Ramos and Philippine Senator Gloria Macapagal Arroyo.

The Migrant Workers and Overseas Filipinos Act of 1995 (R.A. 8042) provided a framework for stronger protection of Filipino workers abroad, with the creation of the Legal Assistance Fund and the Assistance-to-Nationals Fund, and the designation in the DFA of a Legal Assistant for Migrant Workers' Affairs, with the rank of Undersecretary of Foreign Affairs.

Among the other significant events in foreign affairs during the Ramos years were: the adoption by ASEAN in 1992, upon Philippine initiative, of the Declaration on the Conduct of Parties in the South China Sea aimed at confidence-building and avoidance of conflict among claimant states; the establishment of the Brunei Darussalam–Indonesia–Malaysia–Philippines East ASEAN Growth Area in 1994; the establishment of the ASEAN Regional Forum (ARF) in 1994 as the only multilateral security dialogue in the Asia-Pacific region conducted at the government level; and the signing between the Philippine Government and the Moro National Liberation Front on September 2, 1996, of the 1996 Final Peace Agreement.

=== Spratly Islands ===
In early 1995, the Philippines discovered a primitive Chinese military structure on Mischief Reef in the Spratly Islands, one hundred and thirty nautical miles off the coast of Palawan. The Philippine government issued a formal protest over China's occupation of the reef and the Philippine Navy arrested sixty-two Chinese fishermen at Half Moon Shoal, eighty kilometers from Palawan. A week later, following confirmation from surveillance pictures that the structures were of military design, Ramos had the military forces in the region strengthened. He ordered the Philippine Air Force to dispatch five F-5 fighters backed by four jet trainers and two helicopters, while the navy sent two additional ships. The People's Republic of China had claimed that the structures were shelters for fishermen but these small incidents could have triggered a war in the South China Sea.

=== Migrant workers protection ===
One of the downturns of Ramos' administration was his experience in handling migrant workers protection. On the eve of his 67th birthday on March 17, 1995, Ramos was on a foreign trip when overseas Filipino worker Flor Contemplación was hanged in Singapore. His last minute effort to negotiate with Singapore President Ong Teng Cheong and Prime Minister Goh Chok Tong failed and he was greeted with protests after his return to Manila. The protests also caused the resignation of Foreign Affairs Secretary Roberto Romulo and Labor Secretary Nieves Confesor from the cabinet. Ramos immediately recalled Philippine ambassador to Singapore Alicia Ramos and suspended diplomatic relations with Singapore. He created a special commission to look into the case and to try to rescue his sagging popularity. The commission was led by retired justice Emilio Gancayco. The Commission recommended the resignation of then Overseas Workers Welfare Administration (OWWA) head David Corpin and 13 other government officials, including two labor attachés.

As also recommended by the Gancayco Commission, Ramos facilitated the enactment of Republic Act 8042, better known as the Magna Carta for Overseas Workers or the Migrant Workers Act, which was signed into law on June 7, 1995. Learning from the lessons of the Contemplación case, Ramos immediately ordered Ambassador to the UAE Roy Señeres to facilitate negotiations after learning the death penalty verdict of Sarah Balabagan in September 1995; Balabagan's sentence was lowered and she was released August 1996. After tensions cooled off, Ramos restored diplomatic relations with Singapore after meeting Prime Minister Goh Chok Tong during the sidelines of the 50th anniversary of the United Nations in New York City.

=== World Trade Organization ===
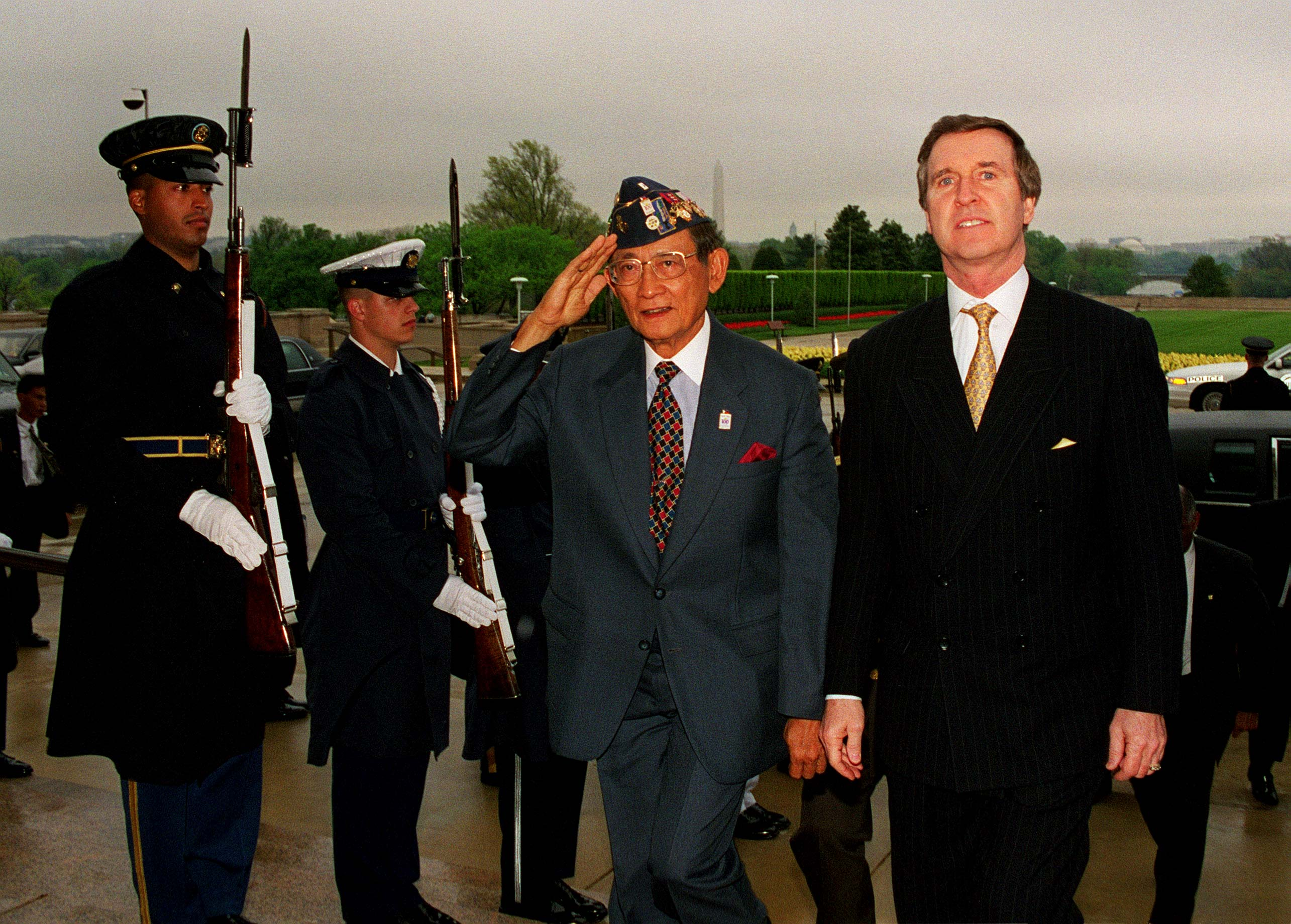
President Fidel V. Ramos troops the honor guards at the Pentagon with Secretary of Defense William Cohen during a State visit in 1998.

Under Ramos' presidency, the Philippines became a member of the World Trade Organization (WTO), an organization that intends to supervise and liberalize international trade. The organization officially commenced on January 1, 1995, under the Marrakech Agreement, replacing the General Agreement on Tariffs and Trade (GATT), which commenced in 1948. The organization deals with regulation of trade between participating countries; it provides a framework for negotiating and formalizing trade agreements, and a dispute resolution process aimed at enforcing participants' adherence to WTO agreements which are signed by representatives of member governments and ratified by their parliaments. Most of the issues that the WTO focuses on derive from previous trade negotiations, especially from the Uruguay Round (1986–1994).

=== 1997 Asian Financial Crisis ===
The 1997 Asian financial crisis, which started in Thailand, was a major blow to the Ramos administration. The economy was hit by currency devaluation, with the Philippine peso falling to ₱41.78 per U.S. Dollar in July 1998 from ₱26.37 in June 1997. Growth fell to about -0.5% in 1998 from 5.2% in 1997, but recovered to 3.1% by 1999. It also resulted to the shutdown of some businesses, a decline in importation, a rise in unemployment rate and an unstable financial sector.

== Controversies ==
=== Clark Centennial Expo Scandal ===
Charges of alleged massive corruption or misuse of funds blemished Ramos' supposed pet project, the Centennial Expo and Amphitheater at the former Clark Air Base in Angeles City, Pampanga. The commemorative projects, particularly those undertaken at the former Clark Air Base, were hounded by illegal electioneering and corruption controversies even years after the Centennial celebrations. A special report by the Philippine Center for Investigative Journalism (PCIJ) showed how the projects relating to the Expo site not only revealed the extravagance and inefficiency of the Ramos administration, but also served as convenient vehicle to effect election fund-raising for the LAKAS political party of Ramos at the expense of the tax-paying Filipinos and in violation of the Election Code. The Centennial Expo Pilipino project, intended to be the centerpiece for the celebrations for the 100th anniversary of the country's independence from Spain, also earned extensive criticisms for being an expensive white elephant project that disadvantaged the government at the cost of ₱9 billion, or 1.7 percent of the country's 1998 national budget. Six ranking Ramos cabinet members and officials, headed by Chair Salvador Laurel (former vice-president) of the Centennial Commission were cleared by the Ombudsman and Sandiganbayan (People's Court). Ramos appeared before a Congressional Committee in October 1998 to help exonerate said officials of any wrongdoing.

=== PEA-Amari Scandal ===
Ramos was accused of corruption in the PEA-Amari deal. The controversial deal involved the acquisition of 158 hectares (390 acres) of reclaimed land on Manila Bay that was to be converted into "Freedom Islands". The deal was forged in April 1995 as part of the Ramos administration's Manila Bay Master Development Plan (MBMDP).

The PEA-Amari deal–in addition to other projects in Manila Bay—displaced over 3,000 fishing and coastal families in Manila Bay to give way to what fisherfolk activists from Pambansang Lakas ng Kilusang Mamamalakaya ng Pilipinas (Pamalakaya) described as "an immoral, illegal and grossly unconstitutional state venture". Ramos denied accusations that the PEA-Amari deal was clinched to benefit members of the ruling Lakas-NUCD as alleged by opposition groups. However, ex-solicitor general Francisco Chavez filed a petition to nullify the PEA-Amari deal because the government stood to lose billions of pesos in the sale of reclaimed lands to Amari.

On April 25, 1995, PEA entered into a joint venture with Amari to develop Freedom Islands and on June 8 of the same year, Ramos approved the deal. On November 29, 1996, then-Senate President Ernesto Maceda delivered a privilege speech assailing the deal as the "grandmother of all scams".

=== EDSA 2 ===
A longstanding criticism of Ramos was whether his role in the ouster of President Joseph Estrada was motivated by his fear of being prosecuted in connection with the Centennial Expo and other scams. When President Gloria Macapagal-Arroyo granted Estrada executive clemency after having been found guilty of plunder by the special Sandiganbayan court in September 2007, Ramos heavily criticized Arroyo's decision. Estrada's son, Senator Jinggoy Estrada, retaliated by asking Ramos to first "come clean" on the alleged multi-billion-peso anomalies involved in the PEA-AMARI, IPP and other deals negotiated during his term.

=== Economic policies ===
Leftist groups have criticised Ramos' Neoliberal economic reforms such as privatization, deregulation and trade liberalization, claiming that the economic growth posted during his presidency was "artificial." They blamed him for the slowdown of the Philippine economy during the 1997 Asian financial crisis. The sale of Petron to Aramco is specifically criticized as resulting to the loss of the government's effective leverage on domestic oil prices. Along with the deregulation of the entire oil industry, Petron's privatization is blamed for the continuing surge in oil prices that has particularly proved to be deleterious to the masses amidst the obtaining high petroleum costs in the global market.

In 1998, Ramos hesitantly admitted that, contrary to what his government earlier claimed, the economic fundamentals of the country may actually be unsound. His admission came following the discovery of a secret memorandum issued by the National Economic Development Authority director-general during the president to tell the Filipinos the truth about the state of the economy and that they ought to prepare for worse. According to former University of the Philippines president Francisco Nemenzo, Ramos "has done nothing to reverse or slow down the implementation" of the harmful IMF-imposed structural reforms.

=== Leaked diplomatic cables ===
On August 30, 2011, leaked diplomatic cables sent by the United States Embassy in Manila revealed that the Libyan government under Muammar Gaddafi allegedly contributed about US$200,000 to the presidential campaign of Ramos in 1992. The report said it was former House Speaker Jose de Venecia who brought Ramos to Gaddafi.

== Philippine Centennial celebrations ==
On June 12, 1998, the Philippines celebrated its centennial year of independence from Spain. The celebrations were held simultaneously nationwide by Ramos and Filipino communities worldwide. A commission was established for the said event; the National Centennial Commission, headed by former Vice President Salvador Laurel, presided all events around the country. One of the major projects of the commission was the Expo Pilipino, a grand showcase of the Philippines' growth as a nation for the last 100 years, located in the Clark Special Economic Zone (formerly Clark Air Base) in Angeles City.

== End of presidency ==
Ramos was the first president under the 1987 constitution to be barred of seeking another term. His predecessor, Corazon Aquino, was still eligible to run for president since she took office under the 1973 Constitution. As his term was winding down, he pushed for constitutional amendments; however, he did not succeed.

Ramos supported his friend, then-Speaker Jose de Venecia, Jr., for the 1998 presidential election; however de Venecia lost to Ramos' vice president, Joseph Estrada. On June 30, 1998, Ramos accompanied his successor to the Barasoain Church in Malolos, Bulacan for the oath-taking rights and later at the Quirino Grandstand in Luneta for the inaugural address.
