= Aquila Legis =

Filipino law fraternity

- ΑLF
- Founded: 1949; 77 years ago Ateneo Law School
- Type: Professional
- Affiliation: Independent
- Status: Active
- Emphasis: Law
- Scope: Local
- Motto: Fidelitas ex Lege
- Colors: Blue
- Symbol: Eagle
- Chapters: 1
- Members: 2,000+ lifetime
- Headquarters: Ateneo de Manila University School of Law, Makati City 1108, Philippines
- Website: www.aquilalegis.org

The Aquila Legis Fraternity (ΑLF) is a Philippine fraternity that originated in Ateneo de Manila University School of Law in the Philippines. As of 2024, it has inducted more than 2,000 members.

== History ==
Aquila Legis Fraternity was founded as Fraternitas Aquilae Legis in 1949 by Joaquin Lorenzo E. Misa, the first bossman or most honorable praeses at the Ateneo de Manila University School of Law. He was joined by 21 second and third-year students of the School of Law, who addressed their seniors in meetings stating, "Boss, with all due respect." Aquila Legis was created as a professional fraternity for Catholic law students and lawyers from the private Catholic university.

As of 2024, the fraternity has inducted over 2,000 members.

== Symbols ==
The fraternity's Latin name, Aquila Legis, translates as "eagle of the law," or "legal eagle." Its motto is Fidelitas ex Lege. The fraternity's symbol is the eagle. Its color is blue.

== Notable members ==
- Jun Abaya – House of Representatives of the Philippines and Secretary of Transportation (Philippines)
- Sergio Apostol – House of Representatives of the Philippines
- Loreto Acharon – House of Representatives of the Philippines
- Silvestre Bello III, Secretary of Labor and Employment and Solicitor General of the Philippines
- Ignacio Bunye – House of Representatives of the Philippines and Executive Secretary (Philippines)
- Jose Calida – Solicitor General of the Philippines
- Mariano del Castillo – Associate Justice of the Supreme Court of the Philippines
- Leo Medialdea – Associate Justice of the Supreme Court of the Philippines
- Antonio Cerilles –Governor of Zamboanga del Sur, Secretary of Environment and Natural Resources, and House of Representatives of the Philippines
- Victor G. Garcia III – Ambassador Extraordinary and Plenipotentiary to the Russian Federation
- Raul Goco – Solicitor General of the Philippines and Philippine Ambassador to Canada
- Neptali Gonzales II – Philippine House of Representatives
- Teofisto Guingona Jr. (1950) – Vice President of the Philippines, Secretary of Foreign Affairs, and President pro tempore of the Senate of the Philippines
- Rodge Gutierrez – House of Representatives of the Philippines
- Adam Jala – House of Representatives of the Philippines
- Bienvenido Laguesma – Secretary of the Department of Labor and Employment
- Ernesto Maceda – President of the Senate of the Philippines
- Raul del Mar – House of Representatives of the Philippines
- Bem Noel – House of Representatives of the Philippines
- Karlo Nograles – Chairperson of the Civil Service Commission and Cabinet Secretary
- Prospero Nograles (1968) – Speaker of the House of Representatives of the Philippines
- Dong Puno – Press Secretary and television public affairs host
- Gabriel Singson – Governor of the Bangko Sentral ng Pilipinas
- Ricardo Rosario – Associate Justice of the Supreme Court of the Philippines
- Dino Tanjuatco – House of Representatives of the Philippines
- Jericho Nograles – House of Representatives of the Philippines
- Francis Tolentino (1988) – Senate of the Philippines
- Felixberto S. Urbiztondo – Mayor of Barobo
- Meynardo Sabili – Mayor of Lipa
- Felipe Remollo – Mayor of Dumaguete
- Antonio T. Vilar – National Treasurer Lakas–NUCD

== Controversies ==
=== Hazing death ===
On February 8, 9, and 10, 1991, Aquila Legis senior members conducted initiation rites for neophytes interested in joining the fraternity's ranks. The codename of the rites included the picnic or nic, golf, and other aliases to maintain secrecy; such hazing on one of the neophytes, Leonardo "Lenny" Villa, led to his death from serious physical injuries at the Chinese General Hospital on February 10, 1991.

In the wake of Villa's death, charges were filed against 26 members of the fraternity. The Regional Trial Court of Caloocan found the defendants guilty of the crime charged. The Court of Appeals however, overturned the findings of the trial court and acquitted 19 of the 26 defendants. The conviction of two lower ranked Aquila Legis fraternity members, Fidelito Dizon, and Artemio Villareal, was upheld, while the sentences for four other fraternity members were downgraded from homicide to slight physical injuries. The Supreme Court later elevated the charges for the four to reckless imprudence resulting in homicide, downgrading Dizon's charges to the same. Villareal died in 2011 while awaiting appeal.

As a result of the controversy surrounding the death of Lenny Villa, Republic Act No. 8049 (more popularly known as the "Anti-Hazing Law") was passed into law in 1995. Up to today, the Lenny Villa case is considered the first case that depicted the fraternity violence that occurs during initiation rites.

The controversy in the Villa Hazing continued years after, when it was reported that the cases against those charged for Villa's death were intentionally delayed through the interference and influence of several high-ranking Aquila Legis members such as former Solicitor General Raul Goco and former Court of Appeals Justice Jose Sabio.

Impeachment of Renato Corona

During the impeachment of Renato Corona, former Supreme Court Chief Justice, Aquila Legis members holding key positions in the House of Representatives were said to be behind the fast-tracking of the hearing of the impeachment complaint against the former Chief Justice, to shelve the impeachment complaint which was likewise concurrently pending against then Supreme Court Associate Justice Mariano del Castillo who is an Aquilan himself, all to protect their fellow Aquilan.

== See also ==
- List of fraternities and sororities in the Philippines
