= Philippine Modern Pentathlon Association =

National sports federation of Modern Pentathlon in the Philippines

- IOC nation: Philippines
- Sport: Modern Pentathlon

History
- Year of formation: 2018

Affiliations
- International federation: Union Internationale de Pentathlon Moderne
- National Olympic Committee: Philippine Olympic Committee

Governing Body
- President: Richard Gomez
- Country: Philippines

The Philippine Modern Pentathlon Association operates as the official national sports organization responsible for governing the sport of modern pentathlon in the Philippines. The organization functions as the sole regulatory body for pentathlon events and manages the selection of national athletes for international competitions. The association maintains official membership status within the Philippine Olympic Committee and holds formal recognition from the Union Internationale de Pentathlon Moderne (UIPM). The national governing body oversees modern pentathlon alongside other "UIPM sports" including laser run and biathle and triathle and obstacle sports. The administrative office of the association is in North Forbes, Makati.

== History ==
The Philippine Modern Pentathlon Association began gaining operational momentum and public visibility around the year 2018. The local government of Ormoc City hosted the first Global Laser Run City Tour in the country in March 2018. The event attracted approximately three hundred athletes from various age groups and backgrounds.. The competition marked the first public introduction of a pentathlon sub-discipline in the Eastern Visayas region. The global governing body approved this initial event to stimulate grassroots interest in the sport among Filipino youth. The event organizers invited international experts including Deniss Cerkovkis and Bernhard Petruschinski to ensure strict compliance with global technical standards. The successful execution of this inaugural event laid the groundwork for continuous national programs and future hosting opportunities.

The association escalated its activities in 2019 to prepare for the regional sporting biennial. The organization hosted official test events in Subic Bay in October 2019. The test events featured participating athletes from the Philippines and Thailand competing in beach laser run and triathle formats. The Philippine athletes dominated the testing phase and proved their readiness for elite competition. The sport officially debuted at the Southeast Asian Games in December 2019. The inclusion of the sport in the regional games required extensive lobbying efforts by local sports officials across neighboring nations. The regional sports leaders accepted the inclusion proposal after observing the successful implementation of the sport at various Asian continental tournaments. The events in 2019 solidified the permanent presence of the association within the national sports framework of the Philippines.

The international president of the sport closely monitored the historical progress of the Philippine association. Klaus Schormann, president of the Union Internationale de Pentathlon Moderne visited the Philippines and met with local Olympic officials in August 2018 to discuss the expansion of beach games and laser run competitions. He returned to Manila in August 2022 to oversee the obstacle course test event and discuss the strategic direction of the sport leading up to the 2028 Summer Olympics.

== Core objectives ==
The Philippine Modern Pentathlon Association holds a mandate to direct the strategic expansion of modern pentathlon across the Philippines. The association works continuously to identify potential athletic talent in provincial schools and local communities. The governing body must organize domestic championships and maintain active development programs to retain its regular membership status with the Philippine Olympic Committee. The organization submits periodic administrative reports and official competition results to the international federation to preserve its voting rights in global congresses. The primary objective involves building a sustainable supply of elite athletes capable of qualifying for the Olympic Games. The association specifically targets the 2028 Summer Olympic Games for potential historic qualification.

The expansion of the sport to the general public serves as another core objective for the association. The traditional format of modern pentathlon required expensive access to horses and specialized fencing equipment. The association directs its primary focus toward the highly accessible sub-disciplines like laser run and obstacle racing. The focus on running and swimming and laser shooting lowers the financial barriers for regular participants from lower-income municipalities. The organization actively promotes the sport in provincial areas outside the national capital region to discover untapped endurance athletes. The leadership aims to prove that decentralized provincial sports programs can produce true world-class competitors. The association utilizes sports tourism as a primary vehicle to promote its regional activities. The integration of athletic events with local civic festivals helps achieve the developmental objectives of the organization.

== Functions and services offered ==
The association provides a wide array of technical and administrative services to its registered members and partner institutions. The organization issues required national licenses to competing athletes and professional coaches. The governing body supplies specialized equipment to regional training centers to facilitate proper instruction. The association imports competition-grade laser pistols and electronic targets required for the shooting segments of the sport. The organization manages the complex logistics of sending national delegations to overseas tournaments across Asia and Europe. The administrative staff handles official tournament registrations and international travel arrangements and foreign visa applications for the athletes. The association conducts specialized training camps to improve the technical skills and tactical awareness of the competitors. The organization facilitated the Asian Development Camp in Ormoc City to train athletes from multiple countries including Saudi Arabia and Kuwait and Iraq.

The association also trains local referees and technical officials to govern domestic events. The organization hosts educational seminars to update local judges on the frequently modified rules of the sport. The governing body operates specialized training facilities to simulate exact international competition environments. The association opened a dedicated modern pentathlon facility in Ormoc City in 2023 to serve as the national training hub. The facility features standard running tracks and precise laser shooting ranges required for proper athletic preparation. The organization provides applied sports science support to its elite national athletes. The association implements highly specific conditioning programs focused on the unique stamina requirements of consecutive multi-sport events. The governing body coordinates directly with the Philippine Sports Commission to secure monthly funding allowances and specialized training grants for top-performing members. The association formed a strategic partnership with the Kuwait Modern Pentathlon Federation to advance the sport through joint international training programs.

The obstacle course discipline represents the newest addition to the regulatory portfolio of the association. The international federation selected obstacle course racing to replace equestrian showjumping after the 2024 Summer Olympic Games. The association coordinates with the Pilipinas Obstacle Sports Federation to train pentathlon athletes in this new physical requirement. The integration of this discipline alters the physiological profile of the ideal pentathlete. The governing body conducts continuous time trials to measure the adaptability of the national team to the new obstacle demands.

== Governance structure and organization ==
The Philippine Modern Pentathlon Association functions as a private non-governmental entity recognized by the Philippines Sports Commission. The internal governance structure consists of an executive board and various specialized operational committees. Richard Gomez occupies the position of President of the association and acts as the chief executive officer. Juliana Torres Gomez serves as the Secretary General of the organization and manages daily administrative affairs. Matt Torres acts as the Vice President of the association and assists in managing the executive duties. The executive officers manage the daily operations and long-term strategic planning of the association. The president holds the absolute authority to represent the organization in international federation congresses and domestic Olympic committee general assemblies. The association operates without direct unallocated government subsidies for its general administrative overhead. The organization generates operating funds through private corporate sponsorships and specific project-based public grants. The organization relies heavily on the local government of Ormoc City for logistical and financial support.

== Milestones ==
The athletes of the Philippine Modern Pentathlon Association delivered performances during the 2019 Southeast Asian Games. The national team secured a total of two gold medals during the regional event to top the discipline standings. Michael Ver Anton Comaling won the gold medal in the men's individual triathle event.

The association found success in the team categories of the regional games. Princess Honey Arbilon and Samuel German teamed up to win the gold medal in the mixed relay triathle event. The local athletes also secured multiple bronze medals in other specific individual events. The regional success proved the viability of the national training programs implemented in Ormoc. The association continued its regional dominance at the 2023 Southeast Asia Championships hosted in Pattaya. The competition featured participants from fifteen different Asian nations. Joseph Godbout captured the gold medal in the men's triathle final against a deep field of competitors. Samuel German won the gold medal in the men's laser run competition. Juliana Sevilla secured the gold medal in the women's laser run event.

The association expanded its competitive focus to international world championships following its regional successes. The national team traveled to Bali to compete in the 2023 UIPM Biathle and Triathle World Championships. The Philippine delegation captured a total of seven medals at the global event. Princess Arbilon and Juliana Sevilla and Shyra Mae Aranzado secured gold medals in the girls triathle individual juniors and the biathle junior team categories. Joseph Godbout won a silver medal in the boys triathle under-17 division. The female athletes also claimed silver in the biathle mixed relay seniors event. The results validated the strategic emphasis on biathle and triathle development initiated by the association leadership.

The athletes continued their global medal performance at the 2024 UIPM Laser Run World Championships in Zhengzhou. Melvin Sacay and Juliana Shane Sevilla won the gold medal in the mixed relay junior event against elite European and Asian teams. Melvin Sacay additionally secured a silver medal in the individual junior category. The national team earned two crucial bronze medals in the mixed relay senior and women's team relay events.

The association later showcased its hosting capabilities by organizing the 2024 Asian Laser Run Championships in Ormoc City. The local athletes capitalized on their home advantage during the continental tournament. Melvin Sacay won the gold medal in the men's senior category. Juliana Shane Sevilla claimed the gold medal in the women's senior category. The continuous string of victories elevated the global ranking of the national association to unprecedented heights.

== Infrastructure development and Grassroots impact ==
The construction of dedicated sports facilities represents a developmental accomplishment for the association. The organization inaugurated a specialized modern pentathlon facility in Ormoc City in 2023. The facility features a standard running track and specialized laser shooting ranges. The infrastructure investment directly correlates with the recent performance by the local athletes. The facility serves as the primary daily training ground for the elite athletes of the country. The presence of professional equipment allows the athletes to simulate exact tournament conditions without traveling abroad. The facility hosted the Asian Laser Run Championships using the school oval as the primary competition theater.

The association made strong structural connections to the local school systems to recruit new athletes continuously. The organization sources many of its top competitors directly from the Ormoc City Regional Sports Academy. The integration of rigorous sports training with standard secondary education ensures a continuous supply of young talent. The association benefits deeply from the national sports advocacy programs championed by legislative allies. The establishment of the National Academy of Sports provides another potential avenue for the association to recruit youth athletes on a national scale. The grassroots development model prioritizes early childhood exposure to laser shooting and open-water swimming to build foundational skills. The association previously sent fencing athletes to Ormoc to train alongside pentathlon competitors during quarantine periods to maintain physical conditioning. The shared training environments foster cross-disciplinary skill development among the various national sports teams.
