= Agnes Devanadera =

Filipina lawyer and government official

The Honorable Agnes VST Devanadera
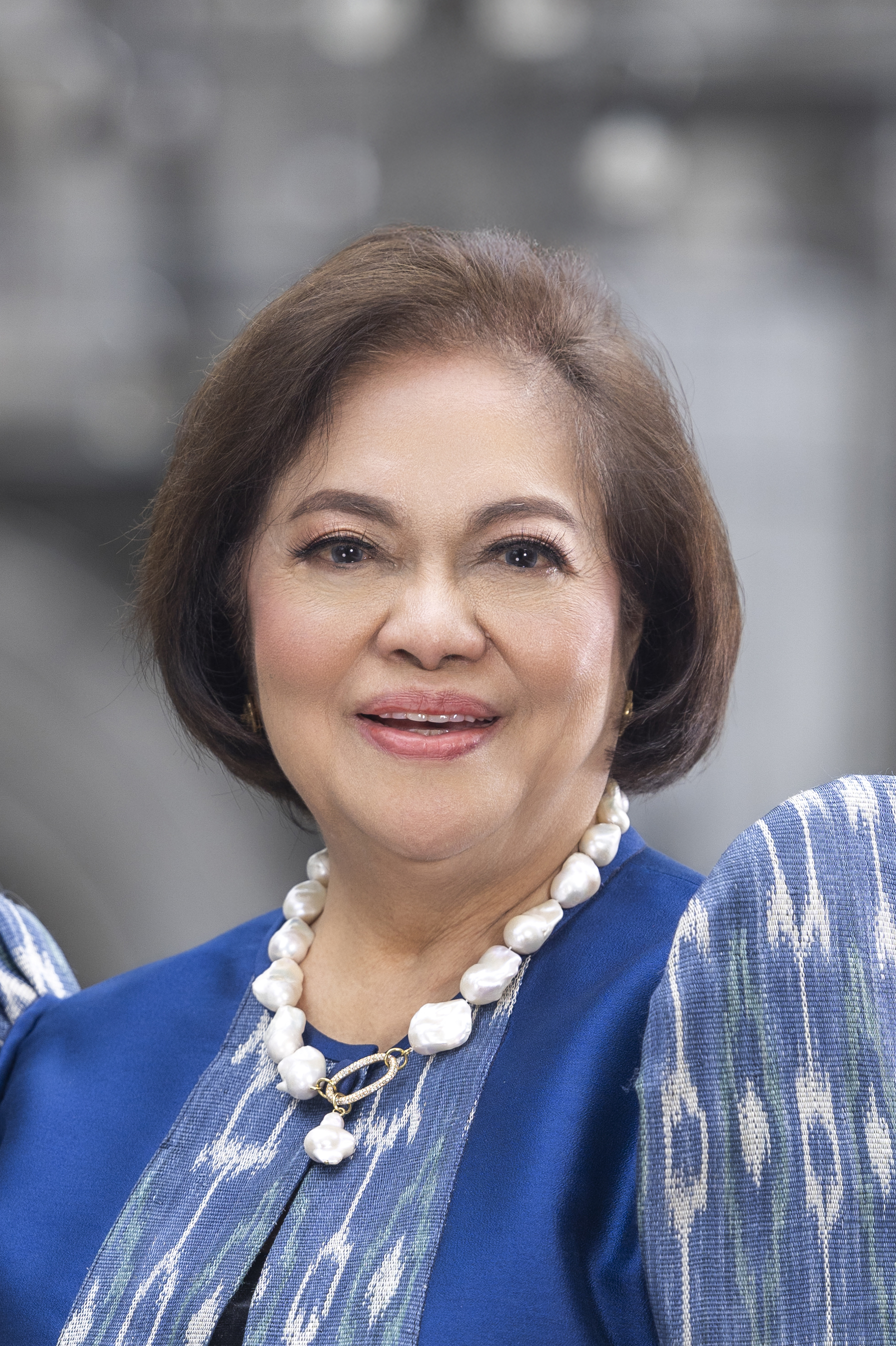
- Official portrait, 2026

President and CEO of the Clark Development Corporation
- Incumbent
- Assumed office September 9, 2022
- Appointed by: Bongbong Marcos
- Preceded by: Manuel Gaerlan

Chairperson of the Energy Regulatory Commission
- In office November 24, 2017 – June 30, 2022
- President: Rodrigo Duterte
- Preceded by: Jose Vicente Salazar
- Succeeded by: Monalisa Dimalanta

Secretary of Justice Officer-in-Charge
- In office January 12, 2010 – March 10, 2010
- President: Gloria Macapagal Arroyo
- Preceded by: Raul M. Gonzalez
- Succeeded by: Alberto Agra (acting)
- In office September 3, 2007 – November 15, 2007
- Preceded by: Raul M. Gonzalez
- Succeeded by: Raul M. Gonzalez

Solicitor General of the Philippines
- In office March 2, 2007 – January 15, 2010
- President: Gloria Macapagal Arroyo
- Preceded by: Antonio Nachura
- Succeeded by: Alberto Agra

Mayor of Sampaloc, Quezon
- In office 1988–1998

Personal details
- Born: April 5, 1950 (age 76)
- Party: Lakas
- Spouse: Noriel P. Devanadera
- Education: Ateneo de Manila University

Agnes Vicenta Salayo Torres-Devanadera (born April 5, 1950), also known as Agnes VST Devanadera, is a Filipina lawyer and politician who is currently the president and CEO of Clark Development Corporation since her appointment by Bongbong Marcos in 2022. She previously served as the chairperson of the Energy Regulatory Commission (ERC) from 2017 to 2022 during the Duterte administration. During the Arroyo administration, she served as the Solicitor General of the Philippines, the first woman to hold the post. She was also the acting Secretary of Justice on two short stints.

== Career ==
Devanadera was the 41st Solicitor General of the Philippines. She was appointed on February 22, 2007, by then-Philippine President Gloria Macapagal Arroyo, succeeding Antonio Nachura who was appointed in January 2007 to the post of Associate Justice of the Supreme Court of the Philippines. Devanadera assumed office on March 2, 2007. She is the first woman to occupy the office. Before her appointment, Devanadera was a government corporate counsel. She also became a candidate for the position of Associate Justice of the Supreme Court of the Philippines that was being vacated by Ruben T. Reyes after his retirement on January 2, 2009.

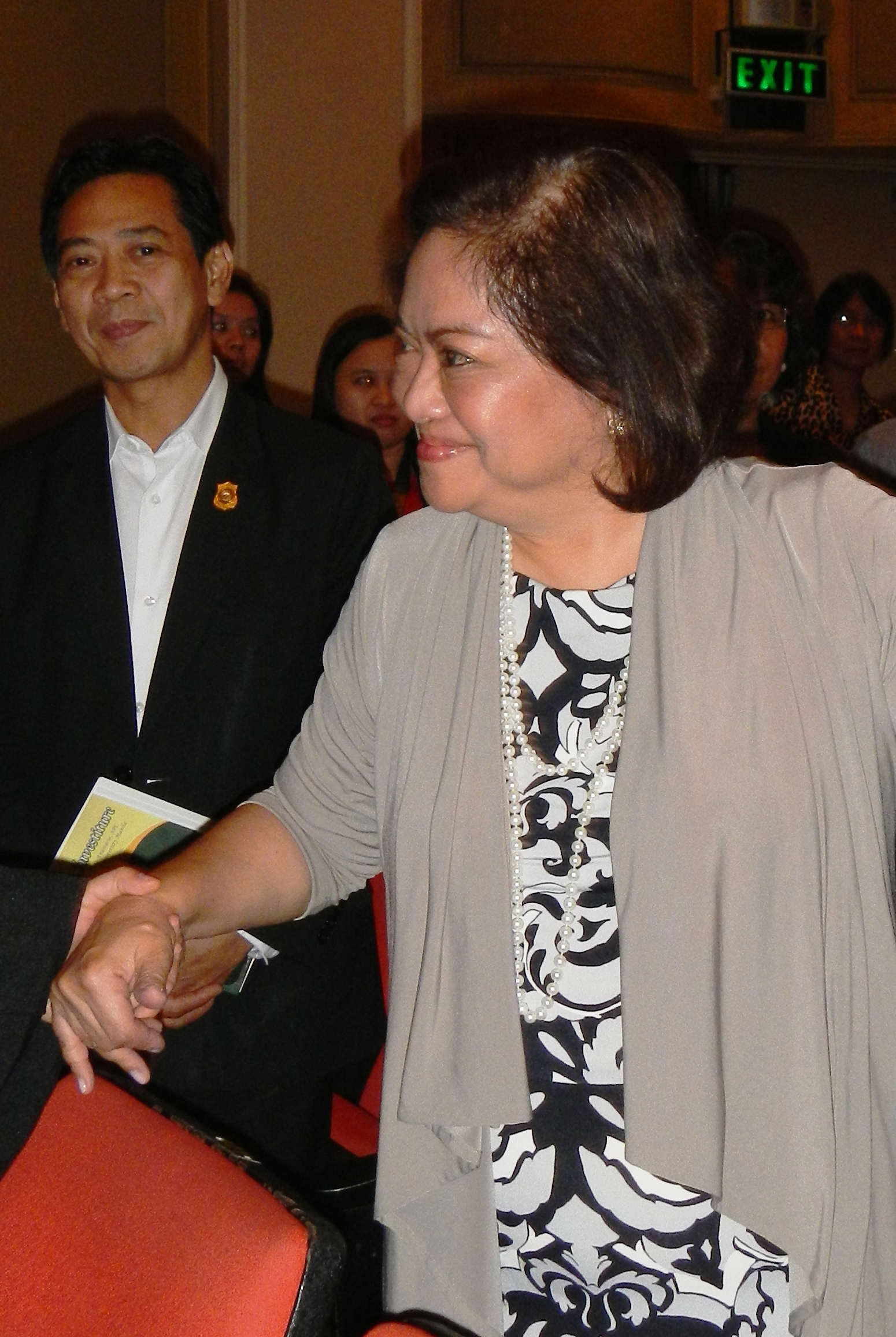
Devanadera, St. Paul University Manila

President Arroyo initially appointed Devanadera Department of Justice (DOJ) officer-in-charge on September 1, 2007, then as acting secretary of the department on September 5, 2007, to temporarily assist then-department secretary Raul Gonzalez, 75, when the latter was hospitalized for a bleeding stomach ulcer and later had kidney transplant. Alberto Agra succeeded her as Government Corporate Counsel at the Office of the Government Corporate Counsel (OGCC) of the DoJ. Devanadera is an Ateneo de Manila Law School alumnus whose mentor is Hernando Perez, a former Secretary of Justice.

=== Timeline ===
- Devanadera was mayor of Sampaloc, Quezon, from 1988 to 1998.
- She was president of the League of Municipalities of the Philippines during the term of President Fidel Ramos. Devanadera contributed to PIRMA's (People's Initiative for Reform, Modernization and Action) gathering of signatures for constitutional change to let Ramos seek reelection and lift the term limits of local officials.
- She was executive director of Lakas-Christian Muslim Democrats from June 1998 to August 2000.
- She was appointed undersecretary for legal and legislative affairs, Department of the Interior and Local Government from April 1, 2003, to August 31, 2004.
- Devanadera is a protégé of former Justice Secretary Hernando Perez, (who like her father, is resident of Batangas).
- She worked as Perez' partner in Balgos and Perez law office, 1976 to 1987.
- Devanadera became a senior partner of the Libarios, Jalandoni, Devanadera and Dimayuga law firm; she handled cases against former Manila Rep. Mark Jimenez (a.k.a. Mario Crespo). In 2002, Jimenez charged that Devanadera went to his house to extort money. She contradicted the accusation by alleging that she politically contributed to Jimenez' wife, Aleli Panascola's 2001 election campaign as mayor of Mauban, Quezon. Devanadera was appointed counsel of former Justice Secretary Hernando Perez who was held by the Ombudsman liable for graft and extortion regarding Manila Rep. Mark Jimenez's claim that Perez extorted $2 million from him. She successfully had Jimenez deported to the United States for tax evasion trial.
- She was appointed Department of Justice's (DOJ) undersecretary under Justice Secretary Simeon A. Datumanong
- On September 1, 2004, Devanadera officially assumed office as Government Corporate Counsel
- On September 29, 2005, Devanadera ordered the office of assistant government corporate counsel Efren Gonzales locked while he attended the Senate hearing on the North Rail project (regarding EO 464 controversy).
- President Arroyo appointed Solicitor General Agnes Devanadera DOJ officer-in-charge on September 1, 2007, and as acting secretary of the DOJ on September 5, 2007, to temporarily assist Raul Gonzalez, 75, who was hospitalized for bleeding stomach ulcer and later had kidney transplant.
- Devanadera (in the 7-hour oral argument in the Supreme Court of the Philippines Hello Garci scandal), when asked by an Associate Justice how she would prefer to be addressed, since she was solicitor general and acting Secretary of Justice, she replied: “I would rather that I be there with you.” Devanadera pointing to the seat beside Chief Justice Reynato Puno, categorically admitting her quest to be Supreme Court of the Philippines Associate Justice.
- Anakpawis Rep. Crispin Beltran challenged her appointment as acting Justice Chief voicing his doubts "whether she would pursue the resolution of cases of extrajudicial killings and corruption in the country." Devanadera, per filed motion for reconsideration in the Supreme Court, blocked Beltran's release from incarceration due to the Rebellion case.

=== Solicitor General ===
- Devanadera graced the OSG 1st Painting Exhibit on October 24, 2007, collection of 46 paintings
- She successfully convinced the United States Department of Justice and the US Solicitor General to file a brief for the United States as amicus curiae in the case of $35 million deposited account of Arelma (forfeiture case before the Sandiganbayan on Philippine claim)
- Devanadera won for the Government in the MILK CODE case; the 53-page decision by Justice Ma. Alicia Austria-Martinez upheld the validity of DOH Administrative Order No. 2006-0012 or the Revised Implementing Rules and Regulations (RIRR) dated May 12, 2006.
- Devanadera graced the Investiture Rites of Dr. Hernando B. Perez as the 2nd president of the University of Batangas (UB) on August 15, 2007, at the University of Batangas, Batangas City. Particularly, SG Devanadera was among those who read the citation for Dr. Perez. She was an Ateneo de Manila Law School alumni, and student of her mentor, Perez.

== Legal controversy ==
Previously, Devanadera and Antonio Nachura contested the position of Supreme Court associate justice vacated by Chief Justice Artemio Panganiban. Devanadera's name, however, was deleted in the final list of nominees submitted by the Judicial and Bar Council to the President because of pending graft / regular administrative cases against her (Sec. 5.1, JBC-009 Rule) that Ilocos Sur Governor Luis Singson filed versus Devanadera and others before the Office of the Ombudsman of the Philippines. The criminal cases cited the Anti-Plunder Act in relation to the Anti-Graft and Corrupt Practices Act and involved the Poro Point Special Economic and Freeport Zone. As government corporate counsel and member of the board of trustees of Manila Water (Manila Waterworks and Sewerage System), she was also sued for a MWSS board resolution dated July 29, 2004, deemed questionable.

=== Disbarment case ===
An eight-page Supreme Court judgment of Conchita Carpio-Morales, dated July 4, 2008, dismissed an unverified letter-complaint of "concerned citizens" which charged Devanadera, Rolando Faller, and Santiago Varela of engaging "directly or indirectly in partisan political activities" in the last elections.
