= Ruben Reyes (judge) =

Filipino judge (1939–2021)

The Honorable Ruben T. Reyes

159th Associate Justice of the Supreme Court of the Philippines
- In office 2 August 2007 – 2 January 2009
- Appointed by: Gloria Macapagal Arroyo
- Preceded by: Romeo J. Callejo, Sr.
- Succeeded by: Diosdado M. Peralta

Personal details
- Born: 3 January 1939 Hagonoy, Bulacan, Philippines
- Died: 13 September 2021 (aged 82)
- Spouse: Ellie Cruz-Reyes

Ruben T. Reyes (3 January 1939 – 13 September 2021) was a Filipino jurist who served as an Associate Justice of the Supreme Court of the Philippines from 2007 to 2009.

== Profile ==
Reyes was born in Hagonoy, Bulacan, and was married to lawyer Ellie Cruz-Reyes, of Baliuag, Bulacan (head of screening and evaluation, Ombudsman office, 2001) and have four children with initials WRIT: Pastor Winston, Dr. Roselin, IT consultant Jason Immanuel and lawyer Tammy Ann. Tammy Ann (valedictorian of San Beda college of law) is a division clerk of court in the Court of Appeals.

Reyes earned his law degree from the Manuel L. Quezon University in 1962. He engaged in private practice for several years before becoming an assistant city fiscal in Manila. Reyes won the 1981 Best Resolution Contest.

Reyes was then appointed a trial court judge, assigned first in Bataan, then in Manila where he received an Outstanding RTC award and became RTC Judges Association president. He also edited the Philippine Judges Association Newsletter and Bench Bulletin.

Reyes studied 8 summer courses in the U.S., including the 1st Harvard Law School Workshop for Law Teachers and Scholars, the 35th Academy of American and International Law, Appellate Judges Seminar, California Judicial College and National Judicial College. He was also president of the Philippine Association of Law Professors, trustee and lecturer of the Philippine Judicial Academy. In 2002, he was a Bar examiner in Legal Ethics and authored the Bar Reviewer on Special Penal Laws. He was a pioneer lecturer on Mandatory Continuing Legal Education, co-chair of the Supreme Court sub-committee on MCLE Draft Rules, member of the Supreme Court committee on legal education & Bar matters and resource person in Criminal and Remedial Laws at the UP Law Center. He received the following awards - the CUP Outstanding Justice of the Court of Appeals, Bulacan Dangal ng Lipi, YMCA Presidential awards, and two Supreme Court awards on judicial reforms. He was conferred Doctor of Laws, honoris causa, by Northwestern University, Laoag City on 10 April 2007. He spearheaded the clamor for Mandatory Continuing Legal Education (MCLE) for lawyers in the Philippines and Asia-Pacific.

In 1994, he was appointed by President Fidel V. Ramos to sit on the Court of Appeals. Reyes sat on the appellate court for 13 years, and was eventually named as its Presiding Justice in December 2005.

He was appointed to the Supreme Court on 2 August 2007, by President Gloria Macapagal Arroyo. Following Associate Justices Alicia Austria-Martinez and Cancio Garcia, Reyes became the third former Presiding Justice of the Court of Appeals to sit in the Puno Court. He had been nominated to the Supreme Court four previous times by the Judicial and Bar Council before he was finally appointed to fill the vacancy left with the retirement of Romeo J. Callejo, Sr.

Two retired justices had warned against Reyes’ appointment, since he had exceeded the age limit. Reyes was due to retire in January 2009, when he reached the age of 70. Under the rules of the Judicial and Bar Council, only those career officials who are able to serve for at least one and a half years will be considered. Meanwhile, the High Tribunal asked Reyes to comment on the allegations of corruption in Cebu CA substations during his time in the CA that were raised by a Manila-based newspaper columnist, a litigant who lost a civil case, and an anti-crime crusader in the Visayas. The Court of Appeals stations in the Visayas and Mindanao are facing possible reorganization or temporary transfer to Manila in the wake of allegations of corruption in the Cebu judiciary that has worried the Supreme Court. These options were recommended by Reyes.

Reyes retired from the Court in January 2009 upon reaching the mandatory retirement age of 70.

On 14 August 2009, Reyes was found guilty by the Supreme Court of leaking an unpromulgated draft decision that he had penned in the election disqualification case against Negros Oriental Rep. Jocelyn Limkaichong. He was indefinitely barred from practicing law and disqualified from holding government position. The decision that indefinitely barred Justice Reyes from practicing law has been reversed on 16 April 2013, for humanitarian reasons. On 22 April 2014, his remaining disqualification to hold public office was lifted by the Supreme Court.

Before his retirement, he was elected member (2008-2016) of the Judicial Council, highest Court of the United Methodist Church (UMC) worldwide. Thereafter he became Church lay leader of Central United Methodist Church (Manila) and Vice President-Luzon of the Philippine National Prayer Breakfast Foundation, Inc.

On 10 December 2015, he was honored as one of three Justices Special Awardees at the Grand Reunion of Manuel L. Quezon University Alumni Association, Inc. In 2016, he was awarded Dangal ng Wika in Law and Judiciary, highest recognition by Komisyon sa Wikang Filipino (KWF). He was also the new President of the Phil. National Prayer Breakfast Foundation and Vice-President of the UMC Judicial Council 12a.

== Filipino in Court proceedings ==
On 30 August 2007, Reyes urged judges, lawyers and court officials to follow the example set by 3 Bulacan court salas (Branches 6, 80 and 81) using Filipino in proceedings (at the program commemorating the 157th birth anniversary of Marcelo H. del Pilar at the Bulacan State University. Reyes noted that the use of Filipino in Del Pilar's Diariong Tagalog played a major role in enlightening Filipinos about the oppression during the Spanish regime.

== NBN controversy ==
On 28 September 2007, Ruben Reyes clarified that he was not the "Ruben Reyes" mentioned in the network (NBN) deal scandal (the "businessman" and "golfing buddy" of Commission on Elections (Comelec) chairman Benjamin Abalos). Reyes stated: "The guy must be one of several namesakes [but] to erase all doubts in mind of the public, let it be put on record that I categorically deny any relation to the 'Ruben Reyes' linked to the NBN-ZTE controversy.”

== Notable Decisions ==
1. Cosmos v. Nagrama
2. People v. Glino
3. Gordon vs. Payumo
4. A.M. No. 07-09-13-SC: "In re - the column ‘Business Circuit,’ of Amado Macasaet in the September 18, 19, 20, and 21, 2007 issues of Malaya," Indirect Contempt, 49 pages-judgment.

5. G.R. No. 167707 and G.R. No. 173775, The Secretary of DENR vs. Mayor Jose Yap, Dr. Orlando Sacay vs. The Secretary of DENR, October 8, 2008

== Death ==
Ruben Reyes died on 13 September 2021.

== Notes ==
Legal offices
Preceded by Romeo J. Callejo, Sr.	Associate Justice of the Supreme Court of the Philippines; 2007–2009	Succeeded by Diosdado M. Peralta
