= Rosalinda Baldoz =

Filipina politician

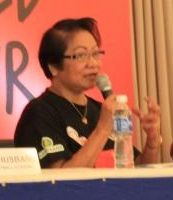

Secretary of Labor and Employment
- In office June 30, 2010 – June 30, 2016
- President: Benigno Aquino III
- Preceded by: Marianito D. Roque
- Succeeded by: Silvestre Bello III

Administrator of the Philippine Overseas Employment Administration
- In office 2001–2010
- President: Gloria Macapagal Arroyo
- Succeeded by: Hans Leo J. Cacdac

Personal details
- Education: Manuel L. Quezon University; National Defense College of the Philippines
- Occupation: Civil servant
- Profession: Lawyer

Rosalinda Dimapilis-Baldoz is a Filipina lawyer, civil servant, and labor arbiter. She served as Secretary of the Department of Labor and Employment (DOLE) of the Philippines under the administration of President Benigno Aquino III.

== Profile ==
Baldoz was a practicing lawyer before she joined the Department of Labor and Employment. She has been a consistent scholar from elementary up to her tertiary and post-graduate education, holds bachelor's degrees in Arts & Science and Law, and a master's degree in National Security Administration. She is a commissioned officer with the rank of lieutenant colonel in the Reserve Force, Philippine Army, Armed Forces of the Philippines.

She had received two scholarship grants in industrial relations: a Colombo Plan scholarship in Australia and a US Agency for International Development (USAID) scholarship at Cornell University in Ithaca, New York. She holds the designation of Career Executive Service Officer I (CESO I), the highest career executive service rank in the Philippines.

== Government service ==
Baldoz rose through the ranks from being a contractual staff at the Bureau of Labor Relations in 1975 to different positions in the Department of Labor and Employment such as mediator-arbiter in 1976, labor arbiter at the National Labor Relations Commission in 1982, Deputy Administrator, later Deputy Executive Director, and finally, Executive Director of the National Conciliation and Mediation Board in 1997.

In 1998, she was named Undersecretary for Labor Relations and Management of the Department. During the time of President Gloria Macapagal Arroyo, Baldoz was elevated to the position of Administrator of the Philippine Overseas Employment Administration (POEA).

== Labor Secretary, 2010-2016 ==
After Aquino won a landslide in the 2010 presidential elections, Baldoz was tapped to join the cabinet to head the labor portfolio. She replaced then acting labor secretary Marianito Roque, a former Administrator of the Overseas Workers Welfare Administration (OWWA).

As Labor Secretary, she presided over the POEA governing board as chairperson. Baldoz also sat as one of the board of directors of Land Bank of the Philippines.

Government offices
Preceded by Marianito D. Roque	Secretary of Labor and Employment; 2010 – 2016	Succeeded by Silvestre Bello III
