= Serafin R. Cuevas =

Filipino judge and Supreme Court Associate Justice (1928–2014)

The Honorable Serafin R. Cuevas

Secretary of Justice
- In office July 1, 1998 – February 15, 2000
- President: Joseph Estrada
- Preceded by: Silvestre Bello III
- Succeeded by: Artemio Tuquero

Associate Justice of the Supreme Court of the Philippines
- In office May 3, 1984 – April 16, 1986
- Appointed by: Ferdinand Marcos
- Preceded by: Conrado M. Vasquez

Personal details
- Born: June 25, 1928 Bacoor, Cavite, Philippine Islands
- Died: February 9, 2014 (aged 85)
- Education: University of the Philippines Diliman (LL.B)
- Profession: Lawyer, jurist

Serafin Romero Cuevas (June 25, 1928 – February 9, 2014) was a Filipino lawyer who served as an associate justice of the Supreme Court of the Philippines from 1984 to 1986.

== Early life and education ==
Cuevas was born on June 25, 1928, in Bacoor, Cavite. He went to Las Piñas Elementary School for his elementary education and to the University of Manila for his tertiary education. He obtained his Bachelor of Laws degree from the University of the Philippines College of Law in 1952 and passed the bar examination the same year. He was a member of the Sigma Rho legal fraternity.

== Career ==
Cuevas started his career as a professorial lecturer at the College of Law of the University of the Philippines and at the Institute of Law of the Far Eastern University. Afterwards, he became an Assistant Fiscal of the City of Manila and then a Judge to the Court of First Instance. In the early 1980s, Cuevas served as an associate justice of the Intermediate Appellate Court, specializing in remedial and criminal law. He also served as chairman of the board of trustees that administers the Iglesia ni Cristo-owned New Era University in Quezon City until he was succeeded by Cipriano P. Sandoval; upon the latter's death in 1986, Cuevas returned as its chairman.

=== Associate Justice of the Supreme Court (1984–1986) ===
On March 14, 1984, Cuevas was secretly appointed to the Supreme Court of the Philippines by President Ferdinand Marcos; his oath of office was later given on May 3 without being disclosed to the press. His appointment would only be publicized on May 30, 1984, with him being noted as a successor to retiring justice Pacifico de Castro. He served in the country's highest court until April 1986, after the People Power Revolution had ended the Marcos administration.

By early July 1986, Cuevas participated in a coup attempt led by former vice-presidential candidate Arturo Tolentino against the Aquino administration, attempting to swear in Tolentino as president of the Philippines in the occupied Manila Hotel before they eventually surrendered after a few days.

According to newspaper columnist Ramon Tulfo, Cuevas' tenure as associate justice was marked by corruption based on allegations shared by Supreme Court employees he spoke to.

=== Secretary of Justice (1998–2000) ===
He served as Justice Secretary under the Joseph Estrada's presidency from 1998 to 2000. In August 1998, upon the directive of President Estrada, Cuevas attempted to initiate a new investigation into the Mendiola massacre that occurred in 1987.

=== Other legal ventures ===
Cuevas later served as Estrada's legal counsel from 2001 to 2007. He is also the defense counsel of Merceditas Gutierrez, but she resigned as Ombudsman before being impeached.

In 2012, Justice Cuevas was the lead counsel of the defense panel against the impeachment of former Supreme Court Chief Justice Renato Corona.

For decades, he has served as a legal counsel for Iglesia ni Cristo, and taught law at New Era University's College of Law, which it owns. He also taught law at FEU College of Law.

== Death ==
Justice Cuevas died on February 9, 2014. He was 85 years old.
