= Raul M. Gonzalez =

Filipino lawyer and politician

Raul Gonzalez
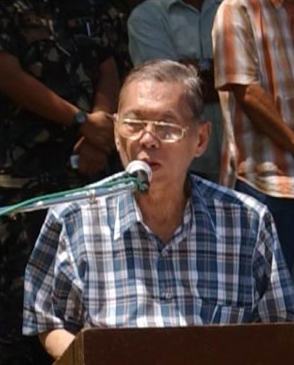

55th Secretary of Justice
- In office November 16, 2007 – January 11, 2010
- President: Gloria Macapagal Arroyo
- Preceded by: Agnes Devanadera
- Succeeded by: Agnes Devanadera
- In office September 1, 2004 – September 2, 2007
- Preceded by: Merceditas N. Gutierrez
- Succeeded by: Agnes Devanadera

Deputy Speaker of the House of Representatives of the Philippines
- In office July 27, 1998 – June 30, 2004
- Preceded by: Agapito Aquino
- Succeeded by: Benigno Aquino III

Member of the Philippine House of Representatives from Iloilo City
- In office June 30, 1995 – June 30, 2004
- Preceded by: Rafael Lopez-Vito
- Succeeded by: Raul Gonzalez, Jr.

Personal details
- Born: Raul Maravilla Gonzalez; December 3, 1930 La Carlota, Negros Occidental, Philippine Islands
- Died: September 7, 2014 (aged 83) Quezon City, Philippines
- Party: Lakas–CMD (2004–2014)
- Other political affiliations: Nacionalista (1995–2004)
- Education: University of San Agustin; University of Santo Tomas
- Occupation: Politician
- Profession: Lawyer

Raul Maravilla Gonzalez (December 3, 1930 – September 7, 2014) was the Chief Presidential Legal Counsel and was the Secretary of Justice of the Philippines.

== Early life and education ==
Gonzalez was born on December 3, 1930, in La Carlota, Negros Occidental. He was the fourth child of Delfin Quimbiong Gonzalez (son of Leon Gonzalez and Felisa Quimbiong), the last mayor of the former town of Jaro in the province of Iloilo; and Maria Estrella Jover Maravilla (daughter of Tranquilino Maravilla and Consuelo Jover), a school teacher who were married on April 3, 1925, in Iloilo City.

Gonzalez completed his Bachelor of Arts degree at the Colegio de San Agustin (now University of San Agustin) and his Bachelor of Law degree at the University of Santo Tomas Faculty of Civil Law in 1955.

Gonzales took the Philippine Bar Examination in 1955 and in the same year, passed with a grade of 99% in Remedial Law and 95% in International Law. He also topped the Judge Advocate General's Office (JAGO) Examinations.

After passing the Bar, Gonzalez became professor of law in the University of Santo Tomas Faculty of Civil Law, the Far Eastern University Institute of Law, and the Philippine College of Commerce (now Polytechnic University of the Philippines). He was also a professorial lecturer at the Philippine Normal University-Manila Graduate School, Assumption College and the College of Holy Spirit. He also lectured in the University of the Philippines Law Center Division of Continuing Legal Education.

== Government service and political career ==
Gonzalez served in the Philippine government in various capacities. He started as a Legal Assistant to the Governor of Iloilo in 1960 before serving as Senior Legal Assistant to the Mayor of Manila in 1961. Gonzalez was Executive Member of the Board of Censors for Motion Pictures under the Office of the President from 1963 to 1969, and Senior Committee Counsel to the Committees on Labor and Immigration in the Philippine Senate, among other positions. Gonzalez fought the martial law regime of Ferdinand Marcos by filing several petitions before the Supreme Court when only a few dared. These cases are now part of constitutional law and are part of the curriculum of every law school in the Philippines.

In 1989, after the restoration of democracy, Gonzalez was suspended by the Supreme Court from the practice of law for an indefinite period as a Tanodbayan for ignorance of the law. He denied that he asked the Supreme Court to lift his suspension but according to the decision, penned by Justice Campos He was reinstated four years later, in 1993.

Gonzalez entered politics in 1995, running for and winning as the representative of the lone Legislative district of Iloilo City. He kept the position for a total of three terms until 2004, the maximum consecutive allowed by the Philippine Constitution. His eldest son Raul Jr ran for the same position and won two terms immediately after his.

In 2000, as a congressman, he was one of the public prosecutors during the impeachment trial of then President Joseph Estrada. The trial ended abruptly in January 2001 when the President was replaced by then-Vice President Gloria Macapagal Arroyo.

Following 2004 election, he was hounded by vote-buying controversies after he promised barangay captains from the city of Iloilo to deliver 12-0 senatorial sweep for the administrations party in the midterm elections. The sweep did not occur. He also promised another cash incentives and free trip to Hong Kong if Iloilo City Council oppositionists Perla Zulueta and Lex Tupas were not to make it to the top 12 (which they did not).

On June 4, 2008, Gonzalez was appointed the Secretary of Justice by President Gloria Macapagal Arroyo.

In a controversial statement made during the April 20, 2007 broadcast of a local news program, he stated that murdered American journalist Julia Campbell was partially to blame for her death. He stated that the Peace Corps volunteer was "a little irresponsible" and that "if she was not alone, it would not have happened.". He also called Campbell "careless" in the same statement.

== Private life ==
Gonzalez is married to Dr. Pacita Trinidad, a former Representative of the second district of Zambales, with whom he has four children. Their eldest son, Raul Gonzalez Jr., is a former Representative of Iloilo City. Another son is the current president of the National Book Development Board, an organization committed to upgrade the publishing industry in the Philippines.

Gonzalez was diagnosed end stage renal disease in September 2007. Later that year, he received a kidney transplant from his driver, Felicito Gunay.

== Death ==
Gonzalez died on September 7, 2014, of complications due to multiple organ failure.

House of Representatives of the Philippines
Preceded by Rafael J. Lopez-Vito	Representative, Lone District of Iloilo City; 1995-2004	Succeeded by Raul T. Gonzalez, Jr.
Legal offices
Preceded by Ma. Merceditas N. Gutierrez	Philippine Secretary of Justice; September 1, 2004 – September 5, 2007	Succeeded by Agnes Devanadera
Preceded by Agnes Devanadera	Philippine Secretary of Justice; November 2007 – 2009	Succeeded by Agnes Devanadera
