= Ricardo Saludo =

Filipino public servant

Ricardo L. Saludo
- Visit of Saludo at the PNP Headquarters at Camp Crame, Quezon City, Philippines in 2008.

Chairperson of the Civil Service Commission
- Ad interim
- In office April 1, 2008 – September 30, 2009
- President: Gloria Macapagal Arroyo
- Preceded by: Karina Constantino David
- Succeeded by: Francisco Duque III

Cabinet Secretary of the Philippines
- In office January 20, 2001 – June 30, 2004
- President: Gloria Macapagal Arroyo
- Preceded by: Alexander Aguirre
- Succeeded by: Silvestre Bello III

Head of the Presidential Management Staff (With the Rank of Secretary)
- In office 2003–2004
- President: Gloria Macapagal Arroyo

Personal details
- Education: University of London; Ateneo de Manila University
- Occupation: Public servant

Ricardo L. Saludo is the former chairperson of the Philippine Civil Service Commission. Under his term as chairperson, the SSL-3 or the third Salary Standardization Law (SSL) was passed, resulting to a hike in monthly compensation of all government officials and employees.

He served the Philippine government, particularly the executive branch, in various capacities: head of the Presidential Management Staff, Cabinet Secretary, and Deputy Presidential Spokesperson to President Gloria Macapagal Arroyo.

== Education ==
Saludo earned his Master of Science (MS) degree, major in public policy and management, from the University of London. He completed his undergraduate studies in 1977 at the Ateneo de Manila University with a bachelor's degree in literature, cum laude.

== Outside government ==
Saludo worked as a senior business editor of AsiaWeek from 1989 to 1995. He later became a commentator of Asia Affairs for CNN and CNBC news networks from 1995 to 2001. He also worked as the assistant managing director of AsiaWeek magazine from 1996 to 2001. In 2002, he left the private sector to join the Arroyo administration.

Presently, he is the managing director, and co-founder along with fellow former presidential spokesperson Sec. Gary Olivar, of the Center for Strategy, Enterprise, and Intelligence, a management and media consultancy firm. He is also lecturer at the National College of Public Administration and Governance (NCPAG) of the University of the Philippines. He teaches the course The Administrator in the Philippine Public Service.
