= Manuel L. Quezon University =

Private university in Quezon City, Philippines

- Pamantasang Manuel L. Quezon (Filipino)
- Former names: Manuel L. Quezon School of Law (1947); Manuel L. Quezon Educational Institution
- Motto: Pro Patria et Jure (Latin)
- Motto in English: For Country and Law
- Type: Private, nonsectarian, research, coeducational Basic and Higher education institution
- Established: November 1, 1947; 78 years ago
- President: Paquito Ochoa Jr.
- Vice-president: Lucille Ortile (Executive Vice President); Ar. John Joseph Fernandez (VP for Academic Affairs)
- Location: No. 790 EDSA, South Triangle, Diliman, Quezon City, Metro Manila, Philippines; 14°38′09″N 121°02′38″E
- Campus: Quiapo Campus (No. 916 R. Hidalgo Street, Quiapo & Arlegui St. Manila); Diliman Campus (EDSA near East Avenue, Quezon City)
- Alma Mater song: MLQU Hymn
- Colors: Maroon and White
- Nicknames: Stallions (college men's varsity teams); Lady Stallions (college women's varsity teams); Colts (High school varsity teams)
- Sporting affiliations: NAASCU; UCBL; NCBL
- Mascot: Stallion
- Website: mlqu.ph
- Location in Metro Manila Location in Luzon Location in the Philippines

Manuel L. Quezon University (MLQU) is a private, nonsectarian, coeducational basic and higher education institution in Diliman, Quezon City, Philippines. It is named after the second president of the Philippines, Manuel L. Quezon.

== History ==
On November 1, 1947, eighteen professors and six co-founders, including Associate Justice Jose Benedicto "JBL" L. Reyes, Sen. Lorenzo M. Tanada Sr., Dr. Leoncio B. Monzon, and Justice Arsenio P. Dizon met in a building at the corner of Mendiola and Legarda Streets to begin training 643 students for the law profession. Thus, the Manuel L. Quezon School of Law was born.

The fledgling school produced its first batch of graduates the following year and in the Bar Examinations given in that same year, the school registered a passing average of 97.5%. In 1949, it exceeded its first record with a passing average of 100% with three of its graduates making it to the top ten.

The law school soon found it necessary to transfer to a new site on Hidalgo Street, where other academic units were organized beginning with the School of Arts and Sciences, followed by the Schools of Education, Commerce and Business Administration, Engineering, Architecture and Graduate Studies. With the addition of these units, the law school became the Manuel L. Quezon Educational Institution. In 1958, the institution acquired University status.

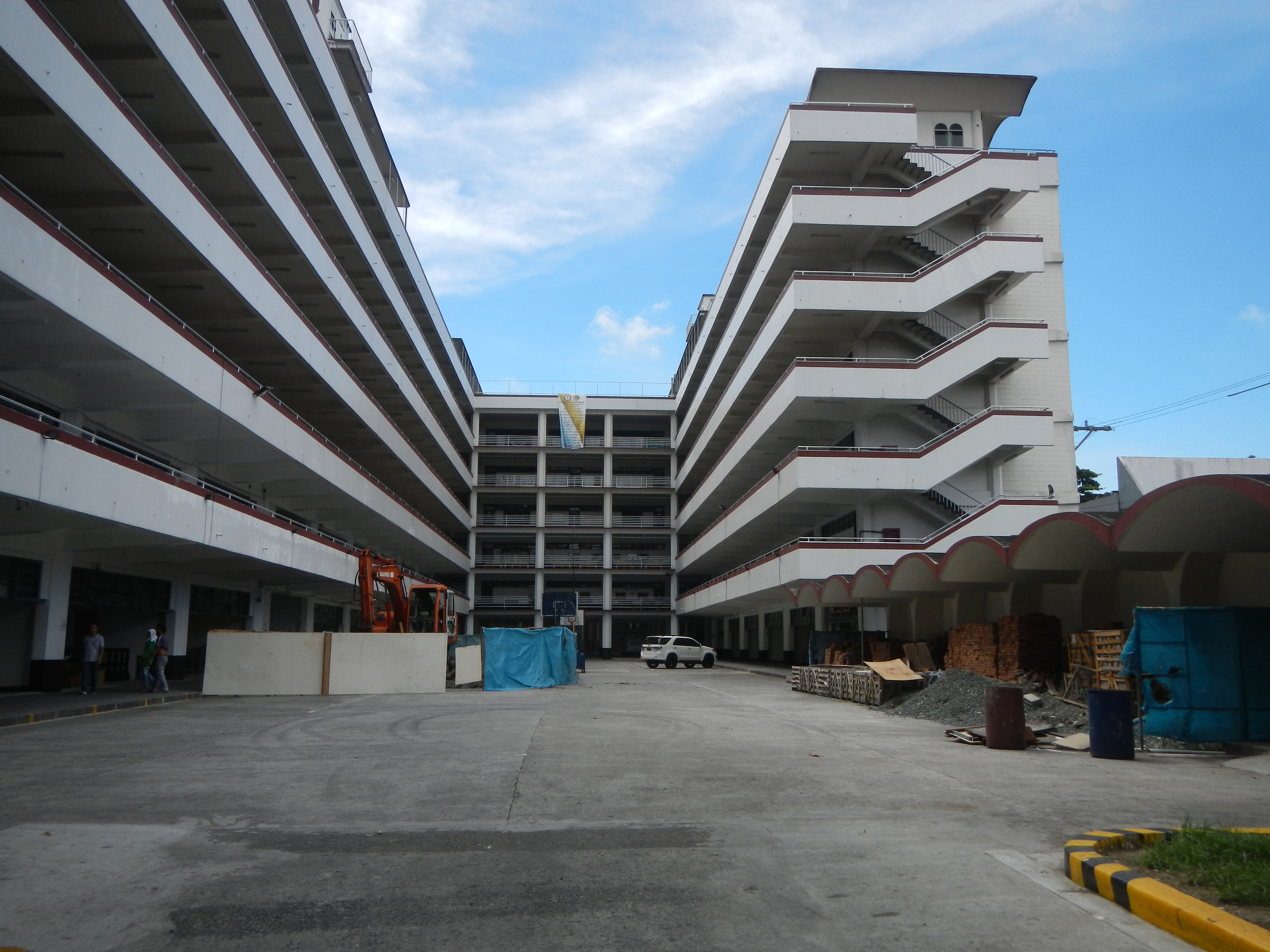
The former Manuel L. Quezon University campus at Quiapo, Manila

Subsequently, the Schools of Criminology, Architecture and Secretarial Education were separated from the School of Arts and Sciences, Engineering and Commerce and Business Administration, respectively. The School of Information Technology is the latest addition to the university community.

The university had two campuses, namely, the Monzon Hall, located at 916 R. Hidalgo Street, Quiapo and the Arlegui Compound at Arlegui St. where the Basic Education Department is located. The Research Center was built adjacent to the Monzon Hall and which was named after Justice Arsenio P. Dizon.

== Move to Quezon City and expansion ==
In August 2014, construction magnate and New San Jose Builders Inc. chairman Jose Acuzar acquired ownership of the university for an undisclosed amount and a year later opened the School for Professional Advancement and Continuing Education (SPACE) inside the Victoria Sports Tower along Epifanio de los Santos Avenue, signaling the university's entry to the roster of esteemed academic institutions in Quezon City.

On the occasion of Quezon City Day and the 138th birth anniversary of Manuel L. Quezon, the university officially moved from Quiapo, Manila to Victoria Sports Tower on August 19, 2016, dubbed "Manuel is Home in Quezon City". Two more locations will be added in nearby Timog Avenue and the former site of Bureau of Research and Standards under the DPWH to offer more tertiary courses to potential students and alumni alike.

== Notable people ==
- Roberto A. Abad – retired associate justice, Supreme Court of the Philippines
- Benjamin Abalos – former mayor of Mandaluyong; former chairman, Commission on Elections; former chairman, Metro Manila Development Authority
- Rosalinda Baldoz – secretary of Labor and Employment
- Silvestre Bello III – secretary of Labor and Employment
- Amparo Cabotaje-Tang – former presiding justice, Sandiganbayan
- Rustica Carpio – actress, academic, public servant
- Isagani Cruz – retired associate justice, Supreme Court of the Philippines
- Guillermo de Vega – chairman, Board of Cendors for Motion Pictures (now MTRCB)
- Jamalul Kiram III – Sultan of Sulu
- Sonny Matula – labor leader and lawyer; president, Federation of Free Workers; 2022 and 2025 senatorial candidate
- Jose Melo – chairman, Commission on Elections; retired associate justice, Supreme Court of the Philippines
- Gregory S. Ong – former associate justice, Sandiganbayan
- Blas F. Ople – former Senate President; secretary (later minister) of Labor and Employment; secretary of Foreign Affairs
- Roberto Pagdanganan – governor of Bulacan; secretary of Tourism
- Leonardo Quisumbing – retired associate justice, Supreme Court of the Philippines
- Ruben T. Reyes – retired associate justice, Supreme Court of the Philippines
- Alberto Romulo – senator; secretary of Foreign Affairs; executive secretary
- Wigberto Tañada – senator; congressman
- Martin Villarama – retired associate justice, Supreme Court of the Philippines
- Antonio Villegas – former mayor of Manila

== See also ==
- Quezon City Academy
