= Romeo Callejo Sr. =

Filipino judge (1937–2023)

The Honorable Romeo J. Callejo Sr.
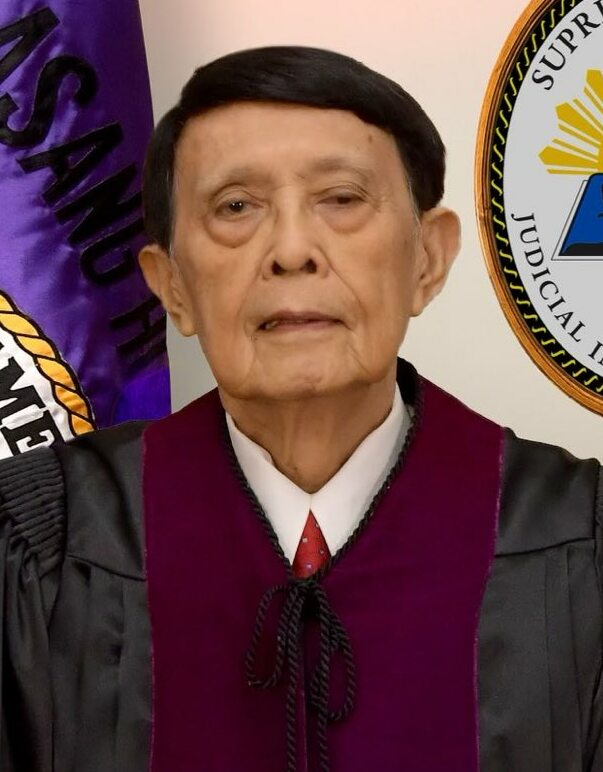

152nd Associate Justice of the Supreme Court of the Philippines
- In office August 26, 2002 – April 27, 2007
- Appointed by: Gloria Macapagal Arroyo
- Preceded by: Sabino R. De Leon Jr.
- Succeeded by: Ruben T. Reyes

Personal details
- Born: April 28, 1937 Santa Lucia, Ilocos Sur, Commonwealth of the Philippines
- Died: September 19, 2023 (aged 86)
- Spouse: Ma. Filipinas Villanueva Callejo

Romeo J. Callejo Sr. (April 28, 1937 – September 19, 2023) was the 152nd associate justice of the Supreme Court of the Philippines. He was appointed to the court on August 26, 2002, by President Gloria Macapagal Arroyo, and served until his mandatory retirement on April 27, 2007.

== Profile ==
Born in Santa Lucia, Ilocos Sur, Callejo Sr. worked with the government for 37 years, serving the Judiciary as magistrate at three court levels.

After earning his Associate degree and Bachelor of Laws from the San Beda College of Law in 1955 and 1962, respectively, as a Silver Medalist, he passed the 1961 Philippine Bar Examinations.

Callejo joined the law office of Senator Jose W. Diokno. Thereafter, he joined the Montenegro, Madayag, and Hernandez Law Office until 1964-1986. He spent the next 24 years in private practice.

Callejo was appointed a Manila trial court judge in 1986 and was promoted to the court of Appeals in 1994 and became a Member of its Committee on the Revision of the Internal Rules, until his appointment to the Supreme Court in 2002.

He attended the Graduate Academy of American and International Law, University of Texas School of Law in 1987. He was a Representative of the Australian-Philippine Training Program, Sydney, Australia in 2000.

An expert in the fields of criminal law and procedural law, Callejo also taught these subjects at various law schools - Pamantasan ng Lungsod ng Maynila, Cosmopolitan Review Center, Integrated Bar of the Philippines, Arellano University, Ateneo de Manila University, University of the Philippines College of Law Law Center, Far Eastern University, including his alma mater San Beda College from 1987 to 2000.

A prolific opinion writer, Callejo retired on April 28, 2007, upon reaching the mandatory retirement age of 70. He received the Justice Jose Abad Santos Award from Chief Justice Reynato S. Puno in the retirement ceremonies held in his honor. As his 21 years of service in the judiciary drew to a close at midnight on April 28, 2007, he was acclaimed by his colleagues for “his untarnished reputation for honesty and integrity, which lawyers and judges, present and future, should emulate.”

He was a Philippine Judicial Academy Professor, and was its Vice-Chancellor in 2015, and Chairperson of the Department of Criminal Law from 1998 until his death.

On October 18, 2020, Callejo Sr. was appointed Judicial Integrity Board's Chairman, for a 3-year term.

Callejo was a member of the Retired Judges Association of the Philippines.

== Personal life ==
Callejo Sr. was married to Maraia Filipinas Villanueva. They had two children.

== Death ==
Callejo, Sr. died on September 19, 2023, at the age of 86. His wake was held at Loyola Memorial Chapels funeral home along Commonwealth Avenue from September 20–23.

On September 22, at 4:00 P.M., Alexander Gesmundo, Diosdado Peralta, Lucas Bersamin and Angelina Sandoval-Gutierrez led the eulogy in the solemn necrological service. On September 23, the cremation of his mortal remains was followed by inurnment ceremony.

== Some notable opinions ==
- People v. Lacson (2003) — on reinstitution of criminal cases for murder against Senator Panfilo Lacson
- People v. Orilla (2004) — Concurring and Dissenting — on aggravating circumstances in rape cases (joined by J. Corona)
- Tecson v. COMELEC (2004) - Separate Opinion — on the nationality of presidential candidate Fernando Poe Jr.
- Brilliantes v. COMELEC (2004) — on validity of proposed COMELEC "quick count" for 2004 presidential elections.
- Navales v. Abaya (2004) — on court-martial of participants of Oakwood mutiny
- ABAKADA v. Ermita (2005) — Concurring and Dissenting Opinion — on constitutionality of 2005 Expanded Value Added Tax law.
- Laurel v. Abrogar (2006) — on phreaking as theft under Philippine criminal law
- NASECORE v. ERC (2006) — on nullification of increase in Meralco electricity rates for violation of due process

Preceded by Sabino R. De Leon Jr.	Associate Justice of the Supreme Court of the Philippines; 2002–2007	Succeeded by Ruben T. Reyes
