= Alberto Agra =

Filipino lawyer

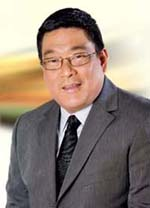

Chairperson of the Philippine Reclamation Authority
- Incumbent
- Assumed office November 7, 2016
- President: Rodrigo Duterte; Bongbong Marcos
- Preceded by: Roberto Muldong

Secretary of Justice
- In office March 10, 2010 – June 30, 2010
- President: Gloria Macapagal Arroyo
- Preceded by: Agnes Devanadera (acting)
- Succeeded by: Leila de Lima

Solicitor General of the Philippines
- In office January 16, 2010 – June 30, 2010
- President: Gloria Macapagal Arroyo
- Preceded by: Agnes Devanadera
- Succeeded by: Jose Anselmo Cadiz

Personal details
- Born: April 7, 1963 (age 63)
- Education: Ateneo de Manila University
- Profession: Lawyer

Alberto Agra (born April 7, 1963) is a Filipino lawyer who previously served as acting Justice secretary of the Republic of the Philippines.

He also serves as president of Pilipinas Obstacle Sports Federation.

== Career ==
Agra was appointed by President Gloria Macapagal Arroyo as acting solicitor general and acting justice secretary in 2010. Three years later, the Supreme Court declared his dual appointment as unconstitutional.

During his tenure as justice secretary, he dropped charges against two suspects in the Ampatuan massacre case, ARMM governor Zaldy Ampatuan and his brother Akmad Ampatuan.

His department also failed to protect Suwaib Upham, a key witness and self-confessed participant in the massacre who sought witness protection and was later murdered in Maguindanao.

Two days before the end of his term, he dismissed charges against government personnel accused of human trafficking.

On 2016, he was appointed by President Rodrigo Duterte as chairman of the board of Philippine Reclamation Authority.
