= Romeo de la Cruz =

Filipino lawyer (1936–2014)

Romeo C. de la Cruz
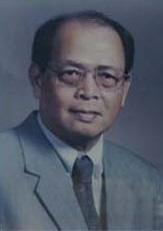

Solicitor General of the Philippines
- In office February 10, 1998 – June 8, 1998
- President: Fidel V. Ramos
- Preceded by: Silvestre H. Bello III
- Succeeded by: Silvestre H. Bello III

Personal details
- Born: 15 November 1936 Urdaneta, Pangasinan,
- Died: 18 March 2014 (aged 77) Antipolo, Rizal
- Occupation: Lawyer

Romeo C. dela Cruz (15 November 1936 – March 18, 2014) was a Filipino lawyer who served as the Solicitor General of the Philippines in 1998.

== Early life and education ==
On November 15, 1936, Romeo de la Cruz was born in Urdaneta, Pangasinan, Philippines. He studied at the University of the Philippines, where he graduated with a Bachelor's Degree in Law. In 1957, he passed the Philippine Bar Examination and came in ninth out of all the candidates.

== Career ==
de la Cruz started practicing law as general practitioner and later on joined the US Department of Veterans Affairs' Manila office as an adjudicator. In 1974, he began working for the Office of the Solicitor General, and in December 14, 1979, he was promoted to Assistant Solicitor General. In 1998 the Solicitor General's post became vacant when Silvestre H. Bello III was appointed interim Secretary of Justice. de la Cruz served Solicitor General from February 10, 1998, until June 8, 1998. During his stint as Solicitor General, he successfully defended cases relating to the expanded value added tax (EVAT), Light Rail Transit III, the police reorganization, and the constitutionality of the death penalty.
