= Pilipinas Obstacle Sports Federation =

Sports governing body in the Philippines

- Sport: Obstacle racing
- Jurisdiction: Philippines
- Abbreviation: POSF
- Founded: 2017
- Headquarters: SM Aura Premier, Bonifacio Global City
- Location: Taguig, Metro Manila
- President: Alberto Agra
- Chairman: Charles Or
- Secretary: Anjo Sarmiento

Official website
- posf.ph
- (Philippines)

The Pilipinas Obstacle Sports Federation, Inc. (POSF; d.b.a. Obstacle Sports Pilipinas) is the governing body for the sport of obstacle racing in the Philippines.

POSF is a member of the World OCR, the international body for obstacle racing, as well as the Asia OCR. It is also a recognized member of the Philippine Sports Commission and the Philippine Olympic Committee.

== History ==
The POSF was incorporated on January 24, 2017 in Mandaluyong, Metro Manila,

The POSF has organized the first edition of the Asian Obstacle Course Race (OCR) Championships in Aseana City in Pasay in January 2018 and hosted the first World OCR coaches certification program. It is set to host the inaugural edition of the World University OCR and the World Youth OCR at the Mall of Asia Arena.

The sports body was responsible for introducing obstacle racing in the Southeast Asian Games, with the discipline making its debut in the 2019 edition hosted in the Philippines.
