= Raul Goco =

Filipino lawyer and diplomat (1930–2014)

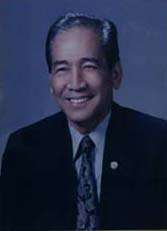

Solicitor General of the Philippines
- In office August 11, 1992 – September 22, 1996
- President: Fidel V. Ramos
- Preceded by: Eduardo Montenegro
- Succeeded by: Silvestre H. Bello III

Personal details
- Born: 24 April 1930 Manila, Philippines
- Died: 16 August 2014 (aged 84)
- Occupation: Lawyer

Raul Ilustre Goco (April 24, 1930 – August 16, 2014) was a Filipino lawyer and diplomat. He served as the Solicitor General of the Philippines from August 11, 1992 until September 22, 1996, as well as the Ambassador of the Philippines to Canada during the 1990s.

== Early life and education ==
Goco was born in Manila on April 24, 1930. He was the son of Dr. Eliseo Goco and Elisa Ilustre. He received a bachelor's degree in law from Ateneo de Manila University in Quezon City. Goco joined the Integrated Bar of the Philippines in 1955 and the New York State Bar Association in 1987. He also had a post-graduate degree at the Far Eastern University, and special studies as a government scholar at the Academy of American and International Law in Dallas, Texas.

== Career ==
Goco worked at the Department of Justice from 1957 to 1961. He then became a solicitor until 1971. In 1973, he was elected governor of the newly-organized Integrated Bar of the Philippines (IBP), serving until 1975. He later became the first Filipino president of the Law Association for Asia and the Pacific (LAWASIA) in 1983. Goco served as Solicitor General from August 1992 to September 1996 during the administration of President Fidel V. Ramos. Afterwards, he was appointed by Ramos as the Philippine ambassador to Canada. He also became the chairman of the College Assurance Plan (CAP) in 2006.

== Personal life and death ==
Goco was married to Ma. Corazon "Marietta" Benito Primicia, daughter of former senator Cipriano Primicias Sr. He had 6 children namely: Raul Gerardo, Regina Paz, Emmanuel Pio, Raoul Roberto, Philip Benjamin and Maria Anna Eugenia. He died at 1:30 a.m. on August 16, 2014, on August 16, 2014, at the age of 84. He had developed pneumonia and renal failure after undergoing surgery for an aneurysm on August 12.
