= Ruben Reyes =

Ruben Reyes may refer to:

- Ruben Reyes (judge) (1939–2021), Filipino judge
- Rubén Reyes (born 1979), Spanish footballer
- Ruben Reyes Jr., American author
