= Cabinet Secretariat (Philippines) =

Philippines government position

- Kalihiman ng Gabinete
- Seal as the Office of the Cabinet Secretary

Cabinet overview
- Formed: December 22, 1986 (first creation); July 8, 2026 (second creation)
- Dissolved: June 30, 2022 (first abolition)
- Superseding Cabinet: Presidential Management Staff (2022–2026)
- Cabinet executive: Benhur Abalos, Cabinet Secretary

Cabinet Secretary
- Kalihim ng Gabinete

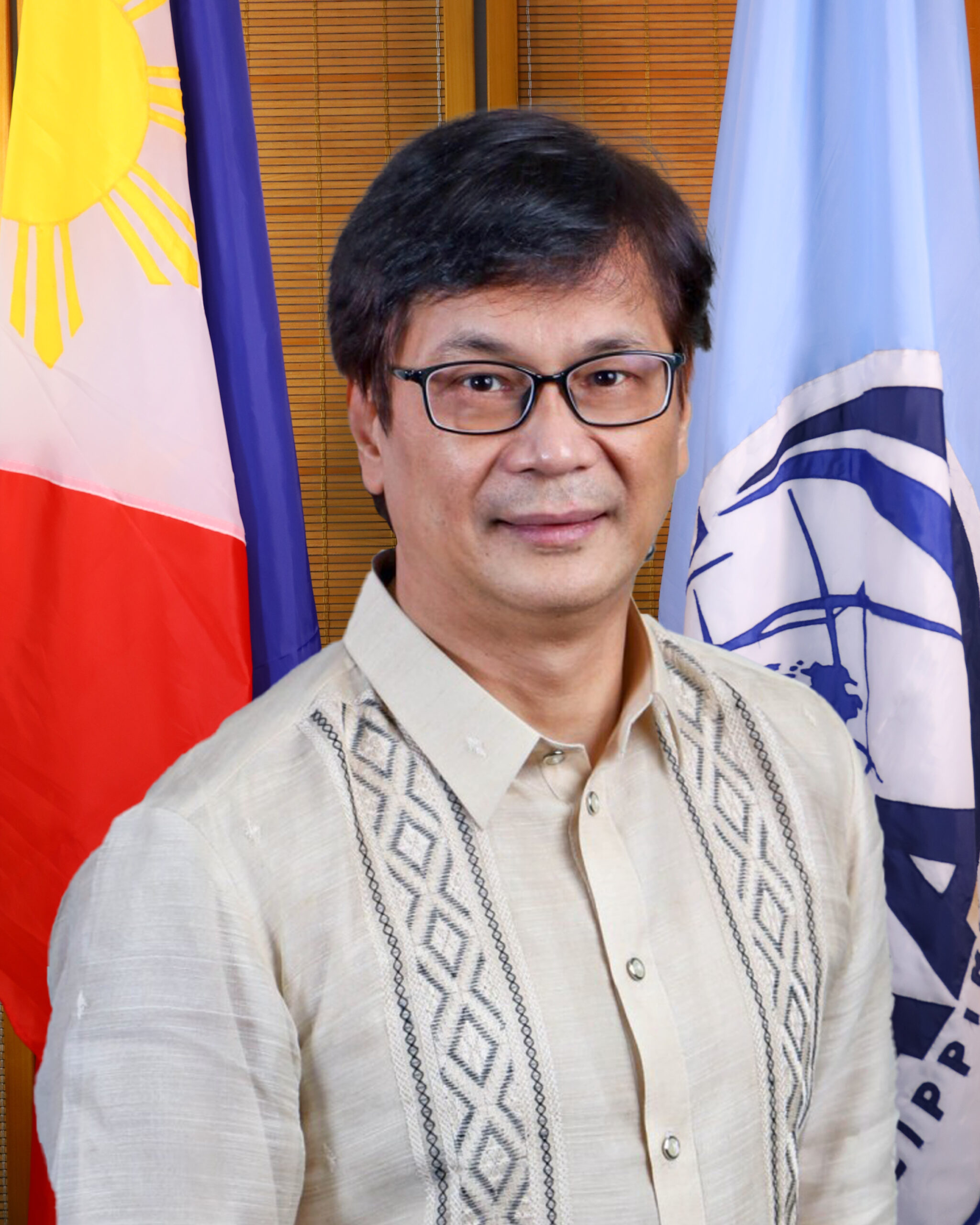
- Incumbent; Benhur Abalos since July 8, 2026
- Style: The Honorable
- Member of: Cabinet
- Appointer: The president
- Term length: At the president's pleasure

The Office of the Cabinet Secretary (Filipino: Tanggapan ng Kalihim ng Gabinete), or the Cabinet Secretariat (Filipino: Kalihiman ng Gabinete), is a member agency of the Cabinet of the Philippines that provides support to the president, facilitates the exchange of information, and discusses and resolves issues among Cabinet members. The cabinet secretary also acts as a coordinator and integrator of the initiatives of the president. The Cabinet Secretariat was created through Executive Order No. 237, s. 1987.

== History ==
The position of Cabinet Secretary traces its origins to the War Cabinet of the Commonwealth government-in-exile, when Col. Manuel Nieto was appointed Secretary to the Cabinet by President Manuel L. Quezon in Asheville, NC. Under President Carlos P. Garcia, a Cabinet Secretariat was formally established as an attached agency of the Executive Office headed by the Executive Secretary. Under the administration of President Ferdinand Marcos, its responsibilities were transferred to the Office of the Prime Minister.

Following the People Power Revolution, the Cabinet Secretariat was reestablished through Executive Order No. 237, s. 1987 signed by President Corazon Aquino. It was renamed as the Office of the Cabinet Secretary by President Benigno Aquino III on October 31, 2012, through Executive Order No. 99. He reinstated the Office of the Cabinet Secretary as an independent body from the Presidential Management Staff, similar to its original mandate in 1987. The Cabinet Secretary was given cabinet ranking and staff support.

The office underwent a reform in 2018, when President Rodrigo Duterte issued Executive Order No. 67, which transferred eight agencies under it to other government agencies and renamed it back as the Cabinet Secretariat.

On June 30, 2022, President Bongbong Marcos issued Executive Order No. 1, which abolished the office alongside the Presidential Anti-Corruption Commission. All powers and functions will be transferred to the Presidential Management Staff.

On July 8, 2026, the position was revived following President Marcos's appointment of Benhur Abalos as Cabinet Secretary.

== Powers and functions ==
According to Section 2 of Executive Order No. 99, the powers and functions of the Office of the Cabinet Secretary were as follows:

Sec. 2. Powers and Functions a. Facilitate the identification of a list of priority areas and outcome-based targets in the Social Contract and PDP 2011-2016, in consultation with the Cabinet Clusters, for final approval of the President;
b. Recommend to the President an annual detailed and measurable performance and projects roadmap that will facilitate outputs of the targets against priorities, in close coordination with the concerned agencies;
c. Ensure the timely execution and monitor the significant impact of the targets under the annual performance and projects roadmap, and re-align targets when needed;
d. Represent the President in meetings and such other fora in order to expedite inter-agency action towards the achievement of the targets identified in the performance and projects roadmap;
e. Assist in providing timely and organized information to the Cabinet on issues and problems submitted for decision and action; and
f. Perform such other functions as may be necessary and incidental to the attainment of its objectives or as may be assigned by the President.

== Reorganization ==
Eight agencies under the Cabinet Secretariat were placed under the jurisdiction of other agencies when President Rodrigo Duterte reorganized the office. The Technical Education and Skills Development Authority (TESDA) and the Cooperative Development Authority were placed under the Department of Trade and Industry; the National Commission on Muslim Filipinos and the Philippine Commission on Women to the Department of the Interior and Local Government (DILG); and the National Anti-Poverty Commission, the National Commission on Indigenous Peoples and the Presidential Commission on the Urban Poor to the Department of Social Welfare and Development (DSWD).

== List of cabinet secretaries ==
Image	Name	Term started	Term ended	President	Era
	Jun Factoran (1943–2020)	December 22, 1986	April 1987	Corazon Aquino	Fifth Republic
	Jose de Jesus	April 1987	January 1990	Corazon Aquino	Fifth Republic
	Aniceto Sobrepeña (1953–2026)	January 1990	June 30, 1992	Corazon Aquino	Fifth Republic
	Ma. Leonora Vasquez-de Jesus	June 30, 1992	March 1996	Fidel V. Ramos	Fifth Republic
	Alexander Aguirre	April 1996	June 30, 1998	Fidel V. Ramos	Fifth Republic
None appointed (June 30, 1998 – January 20, 2001)				Joseph Estrada	Fifth Republic
	Ricardo Saludo	January 20, 2001	June 30, 2004	Gloria Macapagal Arroyo	Fifth Republic
	Silvestre Bello III (born 1944)	June 30, 2004	June 30, 2010	Gloria Macapagal Arroyo	Fifth Republic
Vacant (June 30, 2010 – November 5, 2012)				Benigno Aquino III	Fifth Republic
	Rene Almendras (born 1960)	November 5, 2012	March 8, 2016	Benigno Aquino III	Fifth Republic
	Leoncio Evasco Jr. (born 1944)	June 30, 2016	October 16, 2018	Rodrigo Duterte	Fifth Republic
	Karlo Nograles (born 1976)	November 5, 2018	March 7, 2022	Rodrigo Duterte	Fifth Republic
	Melvin Matibag; Acting	March 9, 2022	June 30, 2022	Rodrigo Duterte	Fifth Republic
Office abolished (Note: All powers and functions transferred to the Presidential Management Staff by virtue of Executive Order No. 1, s. 2022.) (July 1, 2022 – July 8, 2026)				Bongbong Marcos	Fifth Republic
	Benhur Abalos (born 1962)	July 8, 2026	Incumbent	Bongbong Marcos	Fifth Republic
