= Silvestre Bello III =

Philippine politician

The Honorable Silvestre Bello III
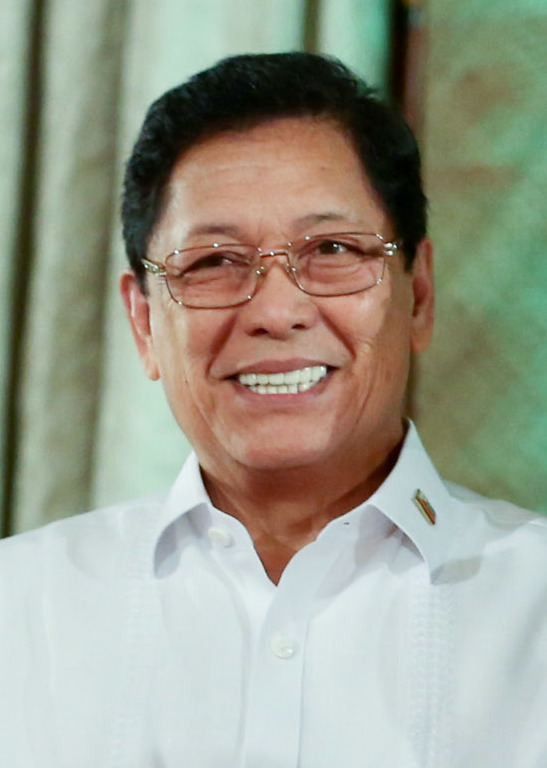
- Bello in 2018

8th Philippine Representative to Taiwan
- In office June 30, 2022 – September 30, 2024
- President: Bongbong Marcos
- Preceded by: Lito Banayo
- Succeeded by: Cheloy Garafil

29th Secretary of Labor and Employment
- In office June 30, 2016 – June 30, 2022
- President: Rodrigo Duterte
- Preceded by: Rosalinda Baldoz
- Succeeded by: Bienvenido Laguesma

Member of the Philippine House of Representatives for 1 BANAT & AHAPO Partylist
- In office June 30, 2013 – June 30, 2016

Cabinet Secretary of the Philippines
- In office June 30, 2004 – June 30, 2010
- President: Gloria Macapagal Arroyo
- Preceded by: Ricardo Saludo
- Succeeded by: Jose Rene Almendras

Solicitor General of the Philippines
- In office June 9, 1998 – June 30, 1998
- President: Fidel V. Ramos
- Preceded by: Romeo de la Cruz (acting)
- Succeeded by: Ricardo P. Galvez
- In office September 23, 1996 – February 3, 1998
- President: Fidel V. Ramos
- Preceded by: Raul Goco
- Succeeded by: Romeo de la Cruz (acting)

45th Secretary of Justice
- In office February 1, 1998 – June 30, 1998 (acting)
- President: Fidel V. Ramos
- Preceded by: Teofisto Guingona Jr.
- Succeeded by: Serafin R. Cuevas
- In office July 15, 1991 – February 10, 1992
- President: Corazon Aquino
- Preceded by: Franklin Drilon
- Succeeded by: Eduardo G. Montenegro (acting)

Personal details
- Born: Silvestre Hernando Bello III; June 23, 1944 (age 82) Gattaran, Cagayan, Commonwealth of the Philippines
- Party: PDP (2016–present)
- Other political affiliations: Lakas (1992–2016); 1-Banat & Ahapo (partylist; 2012–2016)
- Spouse: Regina Gerona
- Children: 5
- Education: Manuel L. Quezon University (AB); Ateneo de Manila University (LL.B)
- Occupation: Lawyer
- Profession: Politician

Silvestre Hernando Bello III (born June 23, 1944) is a Filipino businessman and lawyer from Isabela, who served as the secretary of the Philippines' Department of Labor and Employment, and concurrently Presidential Adviser on the Peace Process, under the Duterte administration. Bello was appointed by President Rodrigo Duterte to replace Rosalinda Baldoz as the Department of Labor secretary.

Bello was a former justice secretary, solicitor general and representative of 1-BAP party-list during the 16th Congress of the Philippines.

In July 2022, he presented his credentials to President Tsai Ing-wen as de facto Philippine Ambassador to Taiwan.

== Early life and education ==
Bello was born in Gattaran, Cagayan, on June 23, 1944. He obtained his Bachelor of Arts in Political Science from Manuel L. Quezon University in Quiapo, Manila, in 1966. He earned his Bachelor of Laws from Ateneo de Manila University Law School in 1970.

== Career ==
=== Marcos dictatorship ===
Bello worked in private practice in the 1970s and 1980s and became active in several civic and human rights groups during the Marcos dictatorship such as the Free Legal Assistance Group (FLAG), the Justice for Aquino, Justice for All (JAJA) Movement, the Coalition of Organizations For The Restoration of Democracy and the Coalition For The Protection of Workers' Rights.

By the mid-1980s, Bello served as chairman of the Davao City chapter of the Makabayang Alyansa (MA, formerly the "Mindanao Alliance"), an opposition group based in Mindanao. In May 1985, Bello became a member of the national organizing committee of the newly established Bagong Alyansang Makabayan (Bayan).

=== Fifth Republic ===
He was appointed by then President Corazon Aquino as an undersecretary of the Department of Justice from 1986 to 1991. Bello served as justice secretary from 1991 to February 1992 when he resigned to run for the Senate as a candidate of Fidel V. Ramos' Lakas-CMD party in the May 1992 elections, which he lost. He was then appointed to several government positions by President Ramos such as the government negotiating panel during peace talks with the CPP-NPA-NDF before running again in 1995 for governor of Isabela but lost to Benjamin Dy. He was then reappointed by President Ramos as solicitor general from September 23, 1996, until February 3, 1998 when he was reappointed secretary of justice. In June of that year he was also concurrently reappointed as solicitor general which he occupied until the end of Ramos' presidency on June 30.

He was the chairman of the Government Negotiating Panel for Talks with the CPP-NPA-NDF from January 2001 to August 2004. He served as president and CEO of PNOC Development and Management Corporation from November 2004 to December 2005. From January 2006 to December 2006 he was the general manager and CEO of the Philippine Reclamation Authority. He was a presidential adviser for New Government Centers from July 2007 to July 2008. He served as Cabinet Secretary during the presidency of Gloria Macapagal Arroyo. He later served as Secretary of Labor and Employment during the entire term of President Rodrigo Duterte from 2016 to 2022. After which, Bello served as chairperson of the Manila Economic and Cultural Office, representing the Philippines to Taiwan, during the presidency of Bongbong Marcos, until he stepped down in September 2024.

Following the arrest of Rodrigo Duterte in 2025, Bello briefly served as Duterte's legal counsel.

== Personal life ==
Bello is married to Regina Gerona. He has five children.

Political offices
Preceded by Faustino Dy	Governor of Isabela; 1986–1988	Succeeded by Benjamin Dy
Preceded by Franklin M. Drilon	Secretary of Justice; 1991–1992	Succeeded by Eduardo G. Montenegro; Acting
Preceded by Raul Goco	Solicitor General of the Philippines; 1996–1998	Succeeded by Romeo de la Cruz; Acting
Preceded by Teofisto T. Guingona, Jr.	Secretary of Justice; Acting; February 1, 1998 – June 30, 1998	Succeeded by Serafin R. Cuevas
Preceded by Romeo de la Cruz; Acting	Solicitor General of the Philippines; June 9, 1998 – June 30, 1998	Succeeded by Ricardo P. Galvez
Preceded by Ricardo Saludo	Cabinet Secretary of the Philippines; 2004–2010	Succeeded by Jose Rene Almendras
Preceded by Rosalinda Baldoz	Secretary of Labor and Employment; 2016–2022	Succeeded by Bienvenido Laguesma
Diplomatic posts
Preceded by Lito Banayo	Representative of the Manila Economic and Cultural Office; 2022–2024	Succeeded by Cheloy Garafil
