= Solicitor General of the Philippines =

National law officer

Office of the Solicitor General
- Tanggapan ng Taga-usig Panlahat

Department overview
- Formed: June 6, 1901
- Jurisdiction: Government of the Philippines
- Headquarters: OSG Building, 134 Amorsolo St., Legaspi Village, Makati, Philippines
- Motto: Pro re publica pro bono populi et patriae (For the Republic, for the good of the people and the country
- Employees: 824 (2024)
- Annual budget: ₱1.37 billion (2023)
- Department executive: Darlene Berberabe, Solicitor General
- Parent Department: Department of Justice
- Website: www.osg.gov.ph

The Office of the Solicitor General of the Philippines (Filipino: Tanggapan ng Taga-usig Panlahat), formerly known as the Bureau of Justice, is an independent and autonomous office attached to the Department of Justice. The OSG is headed by Darlene Berberabe.

The Office of the Solicitor General is the "law firm" of the Republic of the Philippines. The Solicitor General is the principal law officer and legal defender of the Republic of the Philippines. The Solicitor General shall have the authority and responsibility for the exercise of the Office's mandate and for the discharge of its duties and functions, and shall have supervision and control over the Office and its constituent units. The Office of the Solicitor General also determines the legal position that the government will take in the courts and argues in virtually every case in which the government is a party. The OSG is tasked to represent the people of the Philippines, the Philippine government, its agencies, instrumentalities, officials, and agents in any litigation, proceeding, or investigation before the Supreme Court and the Court of Appeals. When authorized by the President, the Solicitor General shall also represent government owned or controlled corporations.

== History ==
=== Attorney General and Solicitor General ===
Act No. 136 dated June 11, 1901, which became effective on June 6, 1901, created the position now occupied by the Solicitor General. Under Section 40 of this Act, the Attorney General, as head of the Bureau of Justice, was vested with the powers and functions of today's Secretary of Justice. At the time, the Solicitor General was second only to the Attorney General in the office the former would eventually head. Appropriately, Section 41 of the Act required an "officer learned in the law" to assist the Attorney General. This law specifically provided that "it should be the special duty of the Solicitor General to conduct and argue suits and appeals in the Supreme Court, in which the Philippine Government is interested."

Meanwhile, a few months after the Bureau of Justice was created, Act No. 222 was passed, establishing the Department of Finance and Justice. The Bureau of Justice was placed under the supervision of a new department. Act No. 2666 would later divide the department into a Department of Justice and a Department of Finance. Under this law, the Attorney General and Solicitor General continued to represent the Government in the Supreme Court and lower courts.

=== Secretary of Justice ===
Act No. 4007 which was enacted in 1932 abolished the position of Attorney General. His functions were taken over by the Secretary of Justice. The Act also named the Solicitor General as the head of the Bureau of Justice. The Assistant Solicitor General, a position created by Act No. 683 of 1903, became second in command of the Bureau.

As a result of the rapidly burgeoning number of cases involving the Government, the Solicitor General after independence was constrained to concentrate on advocacy and court appearances. The functions which the Bureau of Justice used to have were gradually transferred to newly created offices and divisions of the Department of Justice.

=== Solicitor General ===
Executive Order No. 94 of 1947 renamed the Bureau of Justice as the Office of the Solicitor General. Subsequently, the legislature passed R. A. No. 335 in 1948 to confirm this change and to provide for a First Assistant Solicitor General who would be the second highest official in the Office.

A succession of laws relieved the Office of the Solicitor General of some of its burdens. Section 1660 of the old Administrative Code previously provided that the head of the Bureau of Justice "shall have general supervision and control over provincial and city fiscals (now prosecutors) and attorneys and over other prosecuting officer throughout the Philippines." The Office of Special Prosecutors, which the Solicitor General formerly headed, was later converted into a Division of Special Attorneys by R.A. No. 311 of 1948. The Office of the Government Corporate Counsel, which was headed by the Solicitor General under Executive Order No. 392 of 1950, became a separate office in the Department of Justice by virtue of R.A. No. 2327.

From a motley staff of one Solicitor General, an Assistant Solicitor General and a handful of assistant attorneys in the 1900s, the Office of the Solicitor General has grown throughout the years. In accordance with E.O No. 292, the Administrative Code of 1987, the Solicitor General was assisted by fifteen Assistant Solicitors General and more than a hundred Solicitors and Associate Solicitors, who are divided into fifteen divisions. In 2006, with the passing of Republic Act 9417 or the OSG Law, the Office has expanded to thirty (30) legal divisions with a corresponding increase in the general and administrative support personnel and provision for ample office space. Each lawyer at the OSG handles an average of 800 cases at any given time. Aside from the paper chase involved in appealed cases and original petitions before the Supreme Court and the Court of Appeals, a Solicitor General or Associate Solicitor has to match wits with the best lawyers of the country in countless trials."

== Powers and functions ==
The Office of the Solicitor General has the following specific powers and functions:

1. Represent the Government in the Supreme Court and the Court of Appeals in all criminal proceedings; represent the Government and its officers in the Supreme Court, the Court of Appeals, and all other courts or tribunals in all civil actions and special proceedings in which the Government or any officer thereof in his official capacity is a party.
2. Investigate, initiate court action, or in any manner proceed against any person, corporation or firm for the enforcement of any contract, bond, guarantee, mortgage, pledge or other collateral executed in favor of the Government. Where proceedings are to be conducted outside of the Philippines the Solicitor General may employ counsel to assist in the discharge of the aforementioned responsibilities.
3. Appear in any court in any action involving the validity of any treaty, law, executive order or proclamation, rule or regulation when in his judgment his intervention is necessary or when requested by the Court.
4. Appear in all proceedings involving the acquisition or loss of Philippine citizenship.
5. Represent the Government in all land registration and related proceedings. Institute actions for the reversion to the Government of lands of the public domain and improvements thereon as well as lands held in violation of the Constitution.
6. Prepare, upon request of the President or other proper officer of the National Government, rules and guidelines for government entities governing the preparation of contracts, making of investments, undertaking of transactions, and drafting of forms or other writings needed for official use, with the end in view of facilitating their enforcement and insuring that they are entered into or prepared conformably with law and for the best interests of the public.
7. Deputize, whenever in the opinion of the Solicitor General the public interest requires, any provincial or city fiscal to assist him in the performance of any function or discharge of any duty incumbent upon him, within the jurisdiction of the aforesaid provincial or city fiscal. When so deputized, the fiscal shall be under the control and supervision of the Solicitor General with regard to the conduct of the proceedings assigned to the fiscal, and he may be required to render reports or furnish information regarding the assignment.
8. Deputize legal officers of government departments, bureaus, agencies and offices to assist the Solicitor General and appear or represent the Government in cases involving their respective offices, brought before the courts, and exercise supervision and control over such legal officers with respect to such cases.
9. Call on any department, bureau, office, agency or instrumentality of the Government for such service, assistance and cooperation as may be necessary in fulfilling its functions and responsibilities and for this purpose enlist the services of any government official or employee in the pursuit of his tasks. Departments, bureaus, agencies, offices, instrumentalities and corporations to whom the Office of the Solicitor General renders legal services are authorized to disburse funds from their sundry operating and other funds for the latter Office. For this purpose, the Solicitor General and his staff are specifically authorized to receive allowances as may be provided by the Government offices, instrumentalities and corporations concerned, in addition to their regular compensation.
10. Represent, upon the instructions of the President, the Republic of the Philippines in international litigations, negotiations or conferences where the legal position of the Republic must be defended or presented.
11. Act and represent the Republic and/or the people before any court, tribunal, body or commission in any matter, action or proceeding which, in his opinion, affects the welfare of the people as the ends of justice may require; and
12. Perform such other functions as may be provided by law.

== Organizational structure ==
Under Republic Act No. 9417, there shall be at least thirty (30) legal divisions in the Office of the Solicitor General. Each division, permanently headed by an Assistant Solicitor General, shall consist of ten (10) lawyers and such other personnel as may be necessary for the office to effectively carry out its functions. Lawyers in the OSG hold the following ranks: Senior State Solicitor, State Solicitor II, State Solicitor I, Associate Solicitor III, Associate Solicitor II, and Associate Solicitor I. The law likewise dictates that the Solicitor General shall have a cabinet rank and the same qualifications for appointment, rank, prerogatives, salaries, allowances, benefits and privileges as the Presiding Justice of the Court of Appeals; an Assistant Solicitor General, those of an Associate Justice of the Court of Appeals.

The qualifications for appointment, rank, prerogatives, salaries, and privileges of Solicitors shall be the same as judges, specified as follows:

- Senior State Solicitor – Regional Trial Court Judge
- State Solicitor II – Metropolitan Trial Court Judge
- State Solicitor I – Municipal Trial Court in Cities Judge

== List of attorneys general ==
No.	Image	Name	Term of office
1		Lebbeus R. Wilfley	June 15, 1901 – July 16, 1906
2		Gregorio Araneta Soriano	July 17, 1906 – July 1, 1908
3		Ignacio Villamor Borbón	July 1, 1908 – June 30, 1914
4		Ramon Avanceña	July 1, 1914 – March 1, 1917
5		Quintin B. Paredes	July 1, 1918 – June 30, 1920
6		Felecisimo R. Feria	July 1, 1920 – December 31, 1920
7		Pedro T. Tuazon	January 1, 1921 – June 30, 1921
8		Antonio O. Villareal	July 1, 1921 – November 12, 1925
9		Alexander A. Reyes	November 12, 1925 – June 30, 1927
10		Delfin J. Jaranilla	July 1, 1927 – June 30, 1932

== List of solicitors general ==
No.	Image	Name	Term of office	President
1		Gregorio S. Araneta	June 15, 1901 – July 16, 1906	N/A
2		Ignacio Villamor	July 17, 1906 – July 1, 1908	N/A
3		George R. Harvey	July 1, 1908 – June 30, 1914	N/A
4		Rafael Corpus	July 1, 1914 – December 31, 1916	N/A
5		Quintin B. Paredes	March 1, 1917 – June 30, 1918	N/A
6		César Bengzon	July 1, 1932 – June 30, 1934	N/A
7		Serafin P. Hilado	July 1, 1934 – June 30, 1936	N/A
8		Pedro Tuason	July 1, 1936 – August 17, 1938	Manuel L. Quezon
9		Roman Ozaeta	August 17, 1938 – June 30, 1940	Manuel L. Quezon
10		Lorenzo Tañada	July 1, 1940 – June 30, 1941	Manuel L. Quezon
11		Sixto dela Costa	July 1, 1941 – June 30, 1945	José P. Laurel
(10)		Lorenzo Tañada	July 1, 1945 – December 30, 1947	Sergio Osmeña; Manuel Roxas
12		Manuel Lim	December 30, 1947 – June 30, 1948	Manuel Roxas; Elpidio Quirino
13		Felix Angelo Bautista	July 1, 1948 – October 20, 1950	Manuel Roxas; Elpidio Quirino
14		Pompeyo Diaz	October 20, 1950 – November 10, 1952	Elpidio Quirino; Ramon Magsaysay
15		Juan Liwag	November 10, 1952 – February 9, 1954	Elpidio Quirino; Ramon Magsaysay
16		Querube Makalintal	February 9, 1954 – August 31, 1954	Ramon Magsaysay
17		Ambrosio Padilla	September 1, 1954 – December 30, 1957	Ramon Magsaysay
Act		Guillermo E. Torres	December 30, 1957 – June 30, 1958	Carlos P. Garcia
18		Edilberto Barot	July 1, 1958 – June 30, 1961	Carlos P. Garcia
19		Arturo A. Alafriz	July 1, 1961 – January 24, 1966	Diosdado Macapagal
20		Antonio P. Barredo	January 24, 1966 – June 30, 1968	Ferdinand Marcos
21		Felix Makasiar	July 1, 1968 – February 8, 1970	Ferdinand Marcos
22		Felix Q. Antonio	February 9, 1970 -June 30, 1972	Ferdinand Marcos
23		Estelito Mendoza	July 1, 1972 – February 25, 1986	Ferdinand Marcos
24		Sedfrey A. Ordoñez	February 25, 1986 – March 4, 1987	Corazon Aquino
25		Francisco Chavez	March 5, 1987 – February 5, 1992	Corazon Aquino
26		Ramon S. Desuasido	February 6, 1992 – July 5, 1992	Corazon Aquino
Act		Eduardo G. Montenegro	July 6, 1992 – August 10, 1992	Fidel V. Ramos
27		Raul Goco	August 11, 1992 – September 22, 1996	Fidel V. Ramos
28		Silvestre Bello III	September 23, 1996 – February 3, 1998	Fidel V. Ramos
Act		Romeo C. de la Cruz	February 4, 1998 – June 8, 1998	Fidel V. Ramos
(28)		Silvestre H. Bello III	June 9, 1998 – June 30, 1998	Fidel V. Ramos
29		Ricardo P. Galvez	July 1, 1998 – February 15, 2001	Joseph Estrada; Gloria Macapagal Arroyo
30		Simeon V. Marcelo	February 16, 2001 – May 13, 2002	Gloria Macapagal Arroyo
Act		Carlos N. Ortega	May 13, 2002 – November 10, 2002	Gloria Macapagal Arroyo
31		Alfredo Benipayo	November 10, 2002 – March 31, 2006	Gloria Macapagal Arroyo
32		Antonio Nachura	April 3, 2006 – February 11, 2007	Gloria Macapagal Arroyo
33		Agnes Devanadera	March 2, 2007 – January 15, 2010	Gloria Macapagal Arroyo
Act		Alberto Agra	January 16, 2010 – June 30, 2010	Gloria Macapagal Arroyo
34		Jose Anselmo I. Cadiz	July 1, 2010 – February 3, 2012	Benigno Aquino III
35		Francis H. Jardeleza	February 6, 2012 – August 19, 2014	Benigno Aquino III
36		Florin Hilbay	August 20, 2014 – June 18, 2015	Benigno Aquino III
36		Florin Hilbay	June 19, 2015 – June 30, 2016	Benigno Aquino III
37		Jose Calida	June 30, 2016 – June 30, 2022	Rodrigo Duterte
38		Menardo Guevarra	June 30, 2022 – May 29, 2025	Bongbong Marcos
39		Darlene Berberabe	May 29, 2025 – present	Bongbong Marcos
