= Campos (surname) =

Campos is a surname of Spanish and Portuguese origin, meaning "Fields" in both languages. Notable people with the surname include:

== A–F ==
- Adela Graniel Campos (born 1954), Mexican politician
- Adrián Campos (1960–2021), Spanish racing driver
- Adrián Campos Jr. (born 1988), Spanish racing driver
- Ángelo Campos (born 1993), Peruvian football player
- Alex Campos (born 1976), Colombian singer
- Álvaro de Campos, one of Fernando Pessoa's various heteronyms
- Ana Karen Guadiana Campos (born 2002), Mexican tennis player
- Andrey Campos (born 1978), Costa Rican football player
- Ane Campos (born 1999), Spanish footballer
- António Campos (1922–1999), Portuguese film director
- Arsenio Campos (1946–2025), Mexican actor
- Arsenio Martínez Campos (1831–1900), Spanish military officer and revolutionary
- Bernardo de Sousa Campos (1869–1930), Brazilian politician and lawyer
- Bruno Campos (born 1973), Brazilian actor
- Carlos Campos Sánchez (1937–2020), Chilean football player
- Carlos Campos (disambiguation), several people
- Daniel Campos (disambiguation), several people
- Dave Campos (born 1942), American motorcycle racer
- David Campos (born 1970), American attorney
- Derek Campos (born 1988), American mixed martial artist
- Djalma Campos (born 1987), Angolan-Portuguese football player
- Ederson Honorato Campos (born 1986), Brazilian football player
- Edinho Campos (born 1983), Brazilian football player
- Emilio Campos (1954–2022), Venezuelan football player
- Enrique Campos (born 1961), Venezuelan bicycle racer
- Felipe de Souza Campos (born 1981), Brazilian football player
- Florencio Molina Campos (1891–1959), Argentine illustrator and painter
- Francisca Campos (born 1985), Chilean mountain biker

== G–N ==
- Gualberto Campos (born 1981), Venezuelan football player
- Haroldo de Campos (1929–2003), Brazilian poet and translator
- Héctor Campos Parsi (1922–1998), a Puerto Rican composer
- Henrique Campos (1909–1983), Portuguese film director
- Jayro Campos (born 1984), Ecuadorian football player
- Javier Campos (born 1947), Chilean writer
- Jeaustin Campos (born 1971), Costa Rican football player and coach
- Jorge Campos (born 1966), Mexican football player and coach
- Jorge Luis Campos (born 1970), Paraguayan football player
- Jorge Sammir Cruz Campos (born 1987), also known as Sammir, Brazilian-Croatian footballer
- José Campos (disambiguation), several people
- Juan Campos Rodríguez (1907–1995), Spanish Redemptorist missionary
- Juan Morel Campos (1857–1896), Puerto Rican composer
- Julieta Campos (1932–2007), Cuban-Mexican writer
- Kai Campos (born 1986), British electronic musician
- Karel Campos (born 2003), Mexican footballer
- Leonel Campos (born 1987), Venezuelan baseball player
- Liliana Campos (born 1971), Portuguese television presenter and model
- Luiza C. Campos, Brazilian engineer and professor
- Lyndon Campos (born 1966), Brazilian hurdler
- Manuel Campos (canoeist) (born 1985), Spanish marathon canoeist
- Marco Campos (1976–1995), Brazilian racing driver
- María Teresa Campos (1941–2023), Spanish journalist and radio and television presenter
- Mario Campos López (born 1943), Mexican chess master
- Matías Campos (born 1989), Chilean football player
- Nora Campos (born 1965), American politician
- Nuno de Campos (born 1969), Portuguese painter

== O–Z ==
- Orlando Campos (1925–1994), Indian bridge player
- Pablo Campos (born 1983), Brazilian football player
- Pablo Campos (born 2002), Spanish football player
- Paul Campos, American professor and author
- Paulo Campos (1921–2007), Filipino physician and educator
- Paulo Mendes Campos (1922–1991), Brazilian writer and journalist
- Pedro Albizu Campos (1891–1965), Puerto Rican politician
- Pete Campos, United States politician
- Purita Campos (1937–2019), Spanish cartoonist and painter
- Rachel Campos-Duffy (born 1971), American television personality
- Raul Campos, music host at KCRW
- Roberta Campos (born 1977), Brazilian singer-songwriter
- Roberto Campos (1917–2001), Brazilian economist
- Roel Campos (born 1949), United States lawyer
- Rui Campos (1922–2002), Brazilian football player
- Santiago E. Campos (1926–2001), American judge
- Tatica Campos (1892–?), Cuban baseball player
- Tony Campos (born 1973), American musician
- Tomás Campos (born 1975), Mexican football player
- Valerie Campos (born 1983), Mexican artist
- Wlnsvey Campos (born 1995), American politician

== See also ==
- Campos (disambiguation)
