= Vitug =

Vitug is a Filipino surname of Kapampangan origin. Notable people with the surname include:

- Romy Vitug (1937–2024), Filipino photojournalist and cinematographer
- Jose C. Vitug (born 1934), Filipino lawyer and jurist who served as an Associate Justice of the Supreme Court of the Philippines from 1993 to 2004.
