= Ricardo Puno =

Ricardo Puno may refer to:

- Ricardo C. Puno (1923–2018), Philippine jurist
- Dong Puno (Ricardo Villanueva Puno Jr., 1946–2022), Philippine journalist
