= Cancio Garcia =

Filipino judge (1937–2013)

Cancio C. Garcia
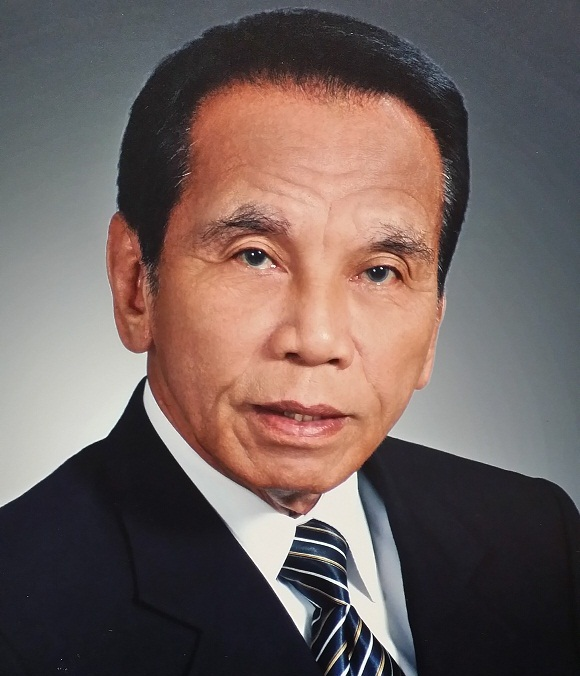

156th Associate Justice of the Supreme Court of the Philippines
- In office October 6, 2004 – October 19, 2007
- Appointed by: Gloria Macapagal Arroyo
- Preceded by: Jose Vitug
- Succeeded by: Teresita Leonardo-De Castro

Personal details
- Born: October 20, 1937 Alitagtag, Batangas, Commonwealth of the Philippines
- Died: October 15, 2013 (aged 75)

Cancio Castillo Garcia (October 20, 1937 – October 15, 2013) was a Filipino lawyer and jurist who served as an associate justice of the Supreme Court of the Philippines. He was appointed to the court on October 6, 2004, by President Gloria Macapagal Arroyo and retired on October 19, 2007.

== Early life ==
Garcia was born on October 20, 1937. The youngest of four children and the only son of Juan Garcia and Benedicta Castillo, who were both illiterates, in the remote barrio of Concordia in Alitagtag municipality of Batangas province.

== Education ==
Starting his education at the P. Gomez Elementary School (Manila), and thereafter at the Arellano (Public) High School (Manila), he qualified for admission to the University of the Philippines College of Law. A product of the public school system, he graduated from the UP in 1961. He obtained a post-graduate degree in public administration as a government scholar from the University of Santo Tomas in 1967.

== Career ==
Honing his skills in the legal profession by serving as the assistant at the Macapagal Alafriz & Mutuc Law Offices, he went on to serve the government, first as Legal Office, then as junior presidential staff assistant in the Legal Office of Malacanang, and thereafter, as solicitor in the Office of the Solicitor General, at that time headed by his former college professor, Solicitor General Estelito Mendoza. He first sat at the bench as City Judge of Caloocan. He served for more than a decade in that capacity, and having won a Judge of the Year award, he rose to the Regional Trial Court (RTC) in Angeles City and later to the RTC in Caloocan. President Corazon Aquino later appointed him as assistant executive secretary for legal affairs. He was then appointed as a judge of the Philippine Court of Appeals where he served for almost fourteen years until 2004, first as an associate justice, then as presiding justice of that court, a position he held twice – from March 14 to July 29, 2001, and April 11, 2002, to April 8, 2003. In October 2004, President Gloria Macapagal Arroyo appointed him as associate justice of the Supreme Court of the Philippines, the court's 156th justice. He retired on October 19, 2007, which coincides with the eve of his 70th birthday.

== Death ==
Cancio Garcia died on October 15, 2013.

== Books ==
- A Study of the Philippine Constitution. By Perfecto V. Fernandez, Jose A.R. Melo, Cancio G. Garcia, Aloysius C. Alday (1974)
- View from the Peak (October 2007)

== Some notable opinions ==
- Jaka Food Processing v. Pacot (2005) — on notice requirement for dismissals of employees for "authorized causes"
- Yuchengco v. Sandiganbayan (2006) – Dissenting — on the recovery of shares of stock in PLDT as part of the ill-gotten wealth of Ferdinand Marcos (joined by J. Ynares-Santiago & Chico-Nazario)
- City Government of Quezon City v. Bayan Telecommunications — on legislated exemptions from real property taxes
- Nicolas-Lewis v. COMELEC (2006) — on absentee voting by Filipinos with dual citizenship
- Bantay Republic Act 7941 v. COMELEC (2007) — on duty of COMELEC to disclose names of party-list candidates

Legal offices
Preceded by Jose Vitug	Associate Justice of the Supreme Court of the Philippines; 2004–2007	Succeeded by Teresita de Castro
