= Carlos Campos =

Carlos Campos may refer to:

- Carlos Campos (equestrian) (1931–2023), Portuguese Olympic equestrian
- Carlos Campos (footballer, born 1937) (1937–2020), Chilean footballer
- Carlos Campos (canoeist) (born 1978), Brazilian sprint canoeist
- Carlos Luis Campos (born 1980), light flyweight boxer from Venezuela
- Carlos de Campos (1866–1927), Brazilian politician
- Carlos Campos (clothing brand) (born 1972), New York-based fashion brand
- Carlos Campos (footballer, born 1992), Mexican footballer
- Carlos Campos (politician) (died 2018), Venezuelan politician and trade union leader
