= José Campos =

José Campos may refer to:

- José Campos (footballer) (born 1983), Salvadoran footballer
- José Campos (baseball) (born 1992), baseball player
- José-Antonio Campos-Ortega (1940–2004), German neurobiologist
- Bernardino José de Campos Júnior (1841–1915), Brazilian politician
- Jose Yao Campos (1922–2016), Filipino businessman
- Jose C. Campos (1923–2005), Filipino jurist, Associate Justice of the Supreme Court of the Philippines
- Jose Campos, former member of the New Mexico House of Representatives, predecessor of George Dodge in the 63rd district
- Jose Campos, fictional character on Golgo 13
- Jose Campos, soccer player for the Long Island Rough Riders
