= Guagua National Colleges =

Roman Catholic college in Pampanga, Philippines

- Former name: Guagua National Institute
- Motto: To serve our students quality education with professional integrity rooted in Faith in God and Oneself, Search for Truth and Knowledge, and Love of Country – Fides, Scientia et Patria.
- Type: Private, Catholic University
- Established: June 18, 1918; 108 years ago
- President: Geraldine G. Lim, MBA
- Location: Guagua, Pampanga, Philippines; 14°58′00″N 120°38′07″E
- Campus: Guagua
- Colors: Red , Green , Yellow , and White
- Nickname: GNC
- Website: gnc.edu.ph
- Location in Luzon Location in the Philippines

Guagua National Colleges often called GNC is a private, non-sectarian Catholic school in Guagua, Pampanga, Philippines. It offers primary, secondary, and tertiary education. The school was founded by Fr. Nicanor M. Banzali, a former parish priest of Guagua.

== Gallery ==
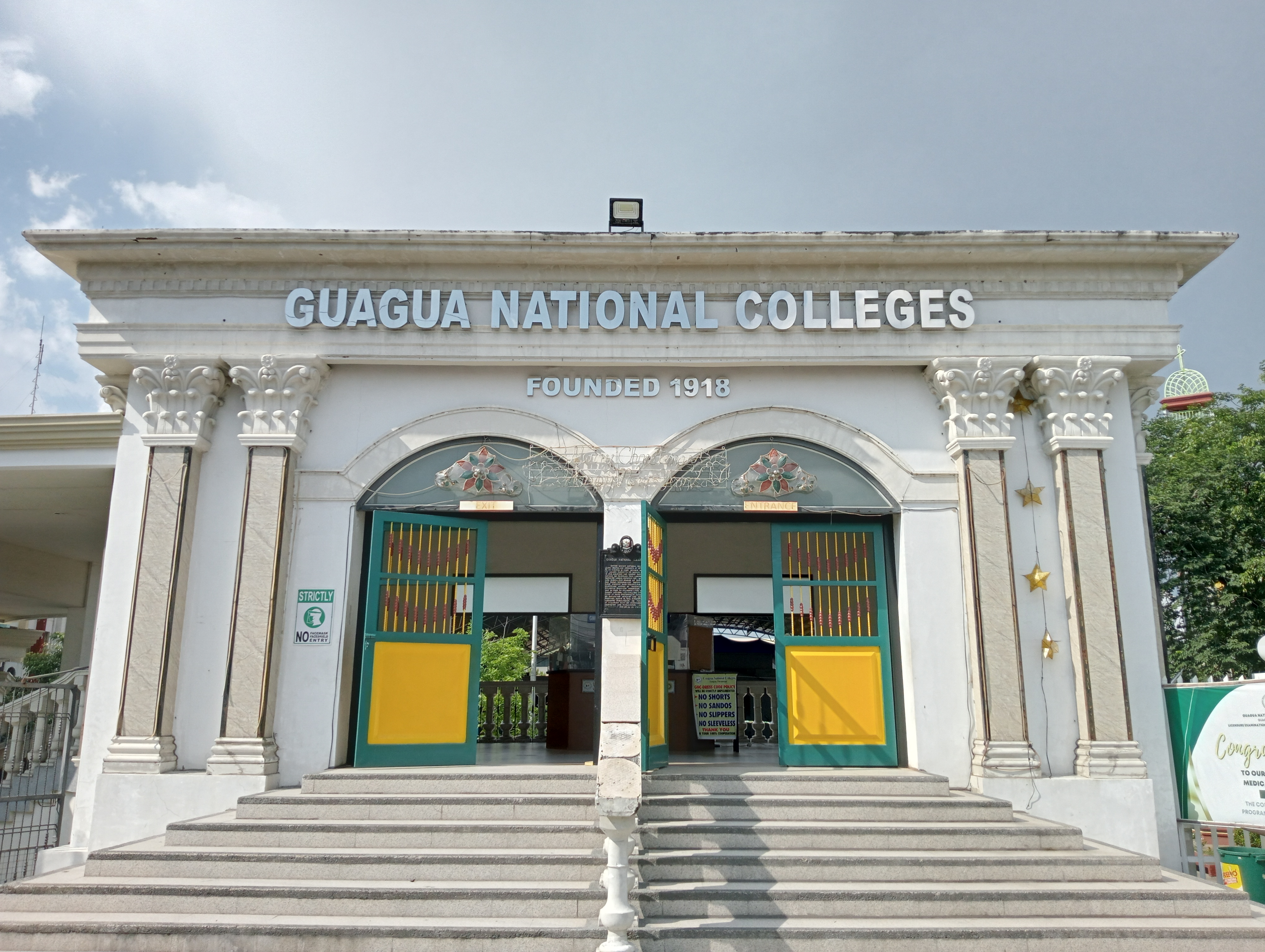
Main gate of the campus in June 2024

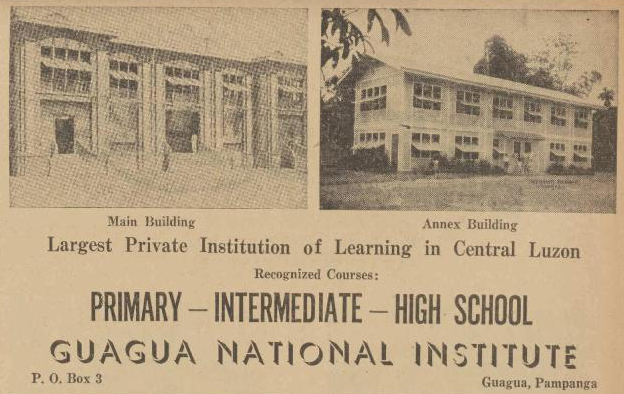
Newspaper advertisement for the Guagua National Institute in 1939

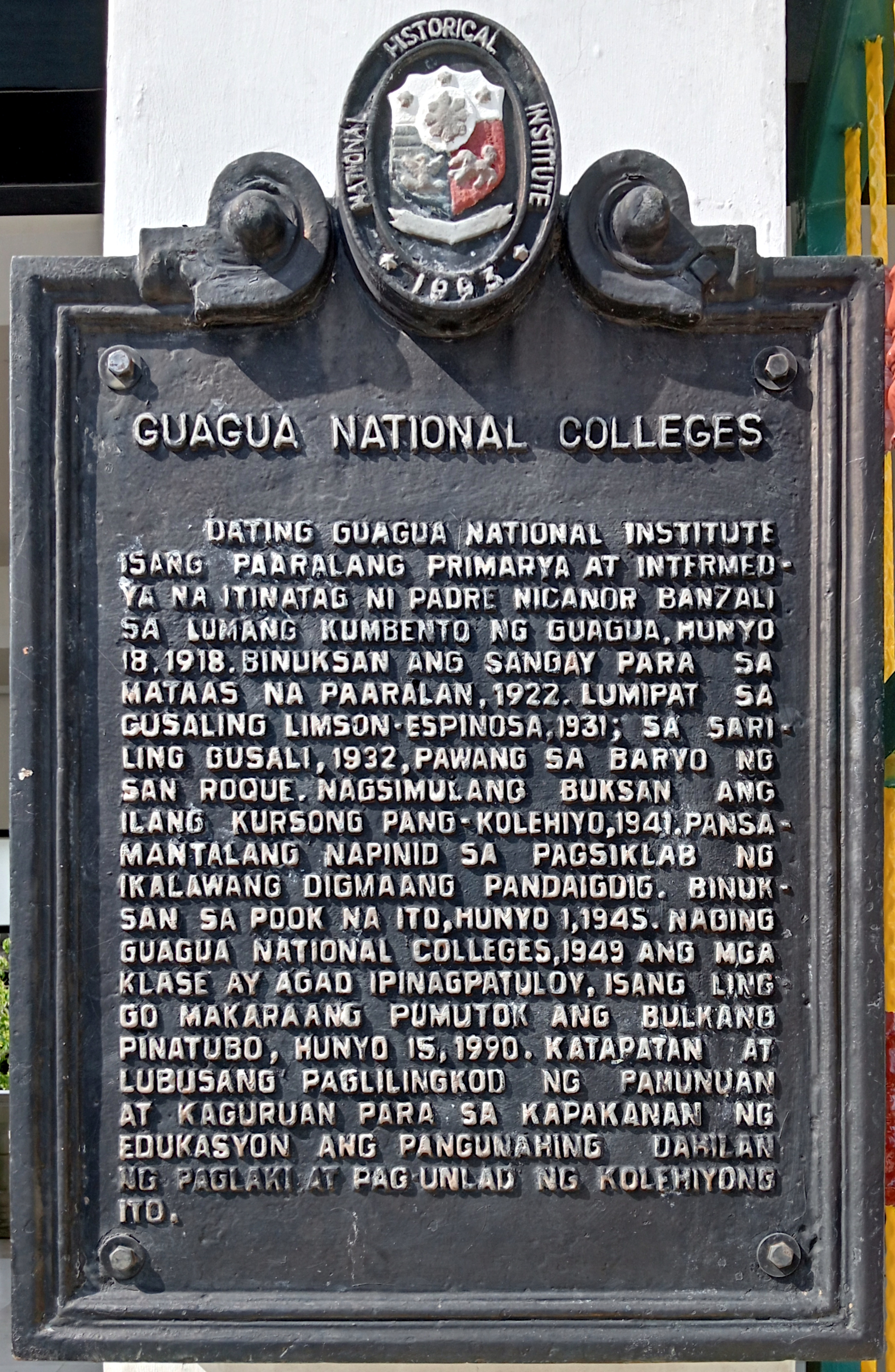
National historical marker installed in 1993

== Notable alumni ==
- Dennis Pineda, politician
- Ricardo C. Puno, lawyer, judge and jurist
- Jose C. Vitug, Associate Justice of the Supreme Court of the Philippines from June 28, 1993 to July 15, 2004
- Jose Montemayor Jr., cardiologist and lawyer
