= Ricardo C. Puno =

Philippine jurist (1923–2018)

Ricardo Concepcion Puno
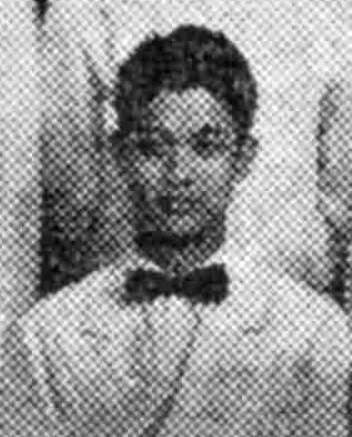
- Puno in 1941

Minister of Justice
- In office July 23, 1979 – June 30, 1984
- President: Ferdinand Marcos
- Prime Minister: Ferdinand Marcos (1979–1981); Cesar Virata (1981–1984)
- Succeeded by: Estelito Mendoza

Member of the Interim Batasang Pambansa from Region IV
- In office June 12, 1978 – June 5, 1984

Personal details
- Born: Ricardo Concepcion Puno; January 4, 1923 Guagua, Pampanga, Philippine Islands
- Died: July 25, 2018 (aged 95)
- Resting place: The Heritage Park, Taguig
- Party: KBL
- Spouse: Priscilla Villanueva
- Children: Ricardo "Dong" Puno, Jr. Ronaldo "Ronnie" Puno Rodolfo "Dody" Puno; Ramon "Mon" Puno; Rogelio "Roy" Puno; Renato "Renato" Puno; Raul "Raul" Puno; Regina Puno; Regis "Reggie" Puno; Rosario "Charilu" Puno; Rosella "Sella" Puno Mapa; Roberto "Robbie" Puno; Roderico "Eric" Puno
- Education: Guagua National Colleges
- Alma mater: Ateneo de Manila University (BA); Manuel L. Quezon University (LL.B)
- Occupation: Lawyer, jurist, lawmaker, Minister of Justice
- Website: www.punolaw.com
- Nickname: Carding

Ricardo Concepcion Puno (January 4, 1923 – July 25, 2018), also known as Ricardo Puno, Sr., was a Filipino lawyer, judge, jurist,Assemblyman, and the Minister of Justice of the Philippines from 1979 to 1984.

== Background ==
Puno was born on January 4, 1923, the youngest of seven siblings in Guagua, Pampanga and went by the nickname Carding. He attended the Ateneo de Manila University and Manuel L. Quezon University (MLQU). He went on to teach at MLQU, beginning a career of teaching law spanning decades and multiple institutions of higher education such as the Ateneo de Manila, the San Beda College of Law, San Sebastián College, Adamson University and the University of the Philippines (UP). He was also a partner at Ledesma, Puno and Associates until 1962.

Puno spoke Filipino, English and Spanish, besides his native Kapampangan.

== Politics ==
Puno was a Member of Parliament (MP) for Region IV (Metro Manila) from 1978 to 1984, and served as Minister of Justice from 1979 to 1984.

== Later life ==
In 1984, Puno resumed his work as a lawyer and founded Puno and Puno Law Offices (PunoLaw). He continued to lecture in law until 1991.

Puno was married to Priscilla Villanueva Puno, with whom he had thirteen children. He died on July 25, 2018, after a lingering illness and is interred at the Heritage Park in Taguig.
