= Campos =

Campos may refer to:

== Geography ==
- Campos (crater), a crater on Mars
- Campos, Spain, a municipality in Mallorca
- Campos Basin, a sedimentary basin offshore of Rio de Janeiro state, named after Campos
- Campos do Jordão, a municipality in the state of São Paulo in southeastern Brazil
- Campos dos Goytacazes, a municipality in Rio de Janeiro state and usually known as Campos
- Campos Gerais, a municipality in Minas Gerais state
- Roman Catholic Diocese of Campos, diocese located in Campos dos Goytacazes, ecclesiastical province of Niterói

== Music ==
- Campos (band), an Italian rock band

== People ==
- Campos (surname)
- Campos (footballer) (born 1952), Cosme da Silva Campos, Brazilian footballer

== Places ==
- Campo's, a deli in Philadelphia known for cheesesteaks and hoagies

== Ship ==
- SS Campos, a Brazilian-owned steamship

== Sports ==
- Campos Racing, a Spanish motor racing team owned by Adrián Campos
- Torneio Internacional de Tênis Campos do Jordão, a tennis tournament in Campos do Jordão, Brazil
