= Mary the Queen College (Pampanga) =

Private college in Pampanga, Philippines

- Dalubhasaang Maria ang Reyna (Filipino)
- Motto: We Transform Lives
- Type: Private, nonsectarian higher education institution
- Established: 2003; 23 years ago
- Affiliations: House of David Group, Mary the Queen Academy of Pampanga
- Chairman: Teresa David-Carlos
- President: Bro. Roman Harold Espeleta
- Vice-president: Dr. Lannie D. Galvan; VP for Academic Affairs
- Location: Jose Abad Santos Ave. San Matias, Guagua, Pampanga, Philippines; 14°58′59″N 120°37′19″E
- Campus: Urban
- Colors: Blue and Yellow
- Nickname: MQC
- Website: mqc.edu.ph
- Location in Luzon Location in the Philippines

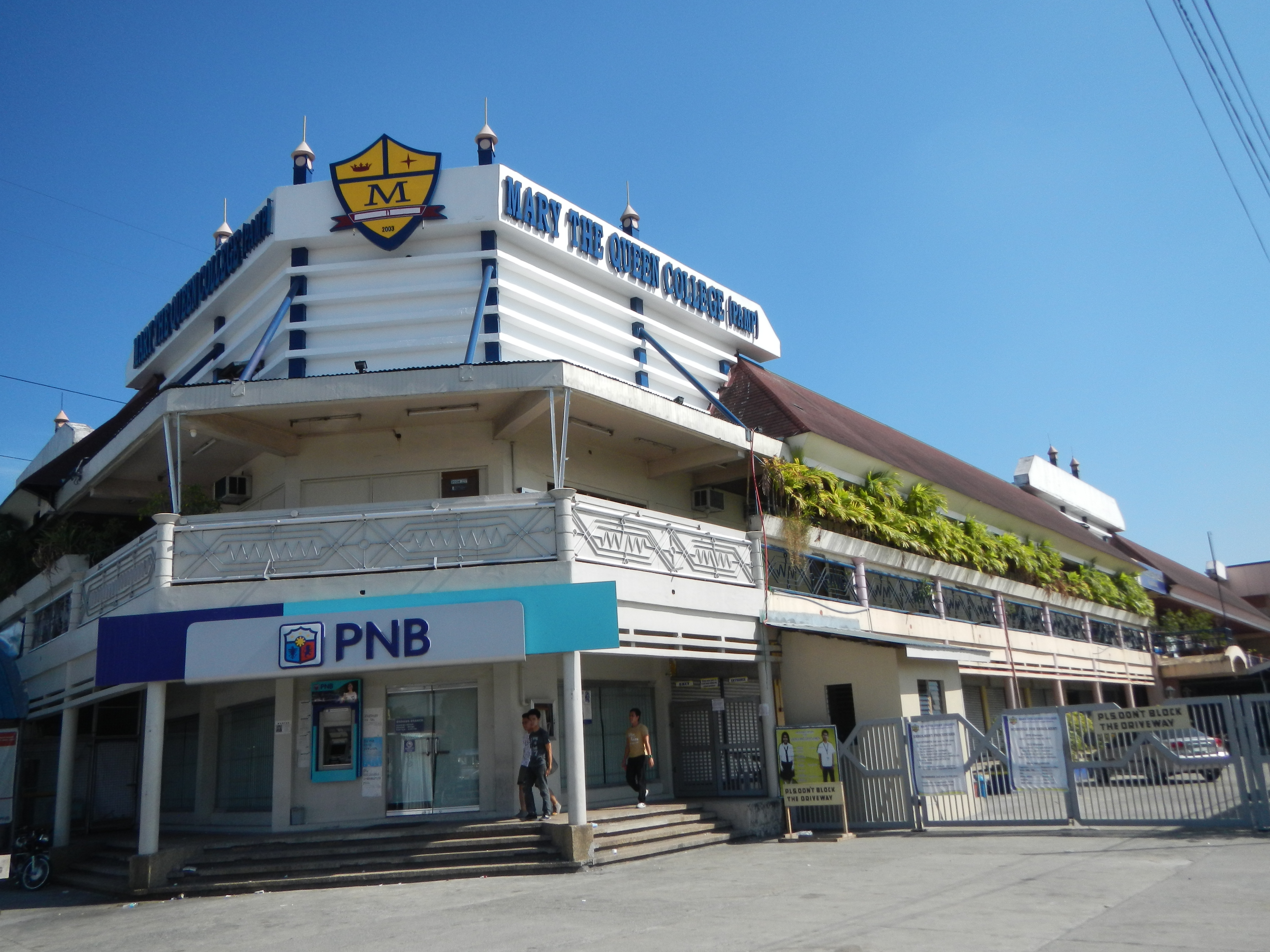
Mary the Queen College (Pampanga), Inc., dusk portrait.

The Mary the Queen College (Pampanga), Inc is a private non-sectarian higher education institution in Guagua, Pampanga, Philippines. It was founded by Ladislao S. David, a prominent entrepreneur of Guagua in 2003.

== History ==
In 2003, a local philanthropist and the founder of the House of David Group, Ladislao S. David, had a clear vision. It focused in establishing an educational institution providing “Academic Excellence and Integral Formation” for underprivileged, deserving students into higher level of education.

He converted the Guagua Shopping Mall into a learning institution. In its initial year of operation, the college offered programs in business, education, and computer studies.

Starting in 2007, it has added courses such as BS Information Systems, BS Hotel and Restaurant Management, BS Information Technology, Bachelor of Elementary Education, and BS Accounting Technology.

In 2009, the institution tied with government agencies such as the Technical Education and Skills Development Authority (TESDA) and, thus, MQC-Career Institute was founded, as the technical vocational arm of MQC offering short vocational courses.

In 2012, MQC started offering night classes intended for working individuals who want to continue and finish college education.
