= Paulo Campos =

Filipino physician (1921–2007)

Paulo C. Campos ONS
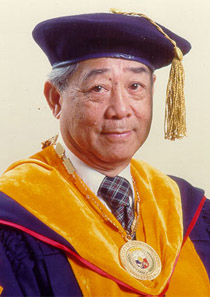
- Official portrait as a National Scientist, National Academy of Science and Technology
- Born: July 27, 1921; Dasmariñas, Cavite, Philippine Islands
- Died: June 2, 2007 (aged 85); Medical Center Manila
- Education: University of the Philippines; Johns Hopkins University School of Medicine
- Relatives: Jose C. Campos (Brother)
- Awards: Order of National Scientists of the Philippines (1989)
- Scientific career
- Fields: Nuclear medicine

Paulo C. Campos (July 27, 1921 – June 2, 2007) was a Filipino physician and educator noted for his promotion of wider community health care and his achievements in the field of nuclear medicine for which he was dubbed as "The Father of Nuclear Medicine in the Philippines". The first president of the National Academy of Science and Technology, he was conferred the rank and title of National Scientist of the Philippines in 1989.

== Early life and education ==
Campos was born in Dasmariñas, Cavite, on July 27, 1921. His younger brother was Jose C. Campos, an associate justice of the Philippine Supreme Court.

Having graduated as valedictorian of his elementary and high school class, Campos enrolled at University of the Philippines. He also took up his medical school at the university. He then took his postgraduate studies at the Johns Hopkins University School of Medicine, the Harvard School of Medicine, and Oak Ridge Institute of Nuclear Studies.

== Contributions to medicine ==
Throughout the 1950s, Campos would pursue graduate studies in the United States; particularly at the Johns Hopkins University School of Medicine, Harvard Medical School, and at the Medical Division of the Oak Ridge Institute of Nuclear Studies. He developed an interest in nuclear medicine while at Johns Hopkins, and completed a training course on the field at Oak Ridge. Two years after his return to the Philippines in 1958, he was named as the head of the Department of Medicine of the University of the Philippines, and concurrently, the head of the department's Research Laboratories.

As head of the Department of Medicine, Campos established the first Medical Research Laboratory in the Philippines at the U.P. College of Medicine. The facility, considered as the country's premier research laboratory in the 1960s, furthered research in fields such as epidemiology, physiology and biology.

=== Nuclear medicine ===
Campos initiated the construction of the first radioisotope laboratory in the Philippines. With funding provided by the International Atomic Energy Authority and other Philippine institutions, the Emilio Aguinaldo College was established at the Philippine General Hospital. As a result, it was made possible for the first time in the country to conduct such procedures as the basal metabolism test and radioactive iodine therapy At the clinic, and with funding from the IAEA and later, the World Health Organization, Campos conducted considerable research on goiter, a common medical problem in the Philippines. His team first suggested the injection of iodized oil (see poppyseed oil) to goiter patients, a treatment later advocated by the WHO.

Through the thyroid clinic, Campos likewise pursued research on whether there was a genetic factor that contributed to endemic goiter. His findings, as contained in a paper that he published in 1961, proposed that the iodine intake deficiency thought to be the main cause of goiter was just one of the triggering factors of the disease, and that physiology and anatomy proved to be more important considerations as some people were born without the enzyme necessary to take in trace elements such as iodine even if it were present in food and water.

=== Community medical outreach ===
As chairman of the Department of Medicine, Campos began the practice of fielding medical interns for community service in Los Baños, Laguna for one month a year. In 1963, the program was institutionalized through the organization of the Comprehensive Community Health Program (CCHP), pursuant to an agreement between the University of the Philippines and the Department of Health. The CCHP, which was based in Bay, Laguna, served as a community health center that serviced several towns in Laguna. Until its closure in 1989, it became the community laboratory of the UP College of Medicine, and it was there that Campos conducted testing on the use of iodized oil for the treatment of goiter.

Campos also founded a hospital in Ermita, Manila, the Medical Center Manila, where he executed several of his ideas relative to health care in urbanized centers.

== Educator ==
In addition to his service at the University of the Philippines, Campos was also affiliated with the Emilio Aguinaldo College of Medicine, which he and his family also managed. Appointed as the president of the college in 1973, he oversaw the establishment in 1977 of a second campus in Dasmariñas, Cavite. The ownership and management of the Dasmariñas campus was sold by the Campos family in 1987 to the De La Salle University, which integrated it into the La Salle system as what is now known as the De La Salle Medical and Health Sciences Institute. The Campos family retained control over the Manila campus of what is now the Emilio Aguinaldo College, a partner-institution of the Medical Center Manila.

Despite his involvement with the Emilio Aguinaldo College, Campos maintained his ties with the University of the Philippines. He was named professor emeritus of the university and appointed a member of its board of regents in 1994.
