= Jose C. Vitug =

Filipino judge (born 1934)

The Honorable Jose C. Vitug
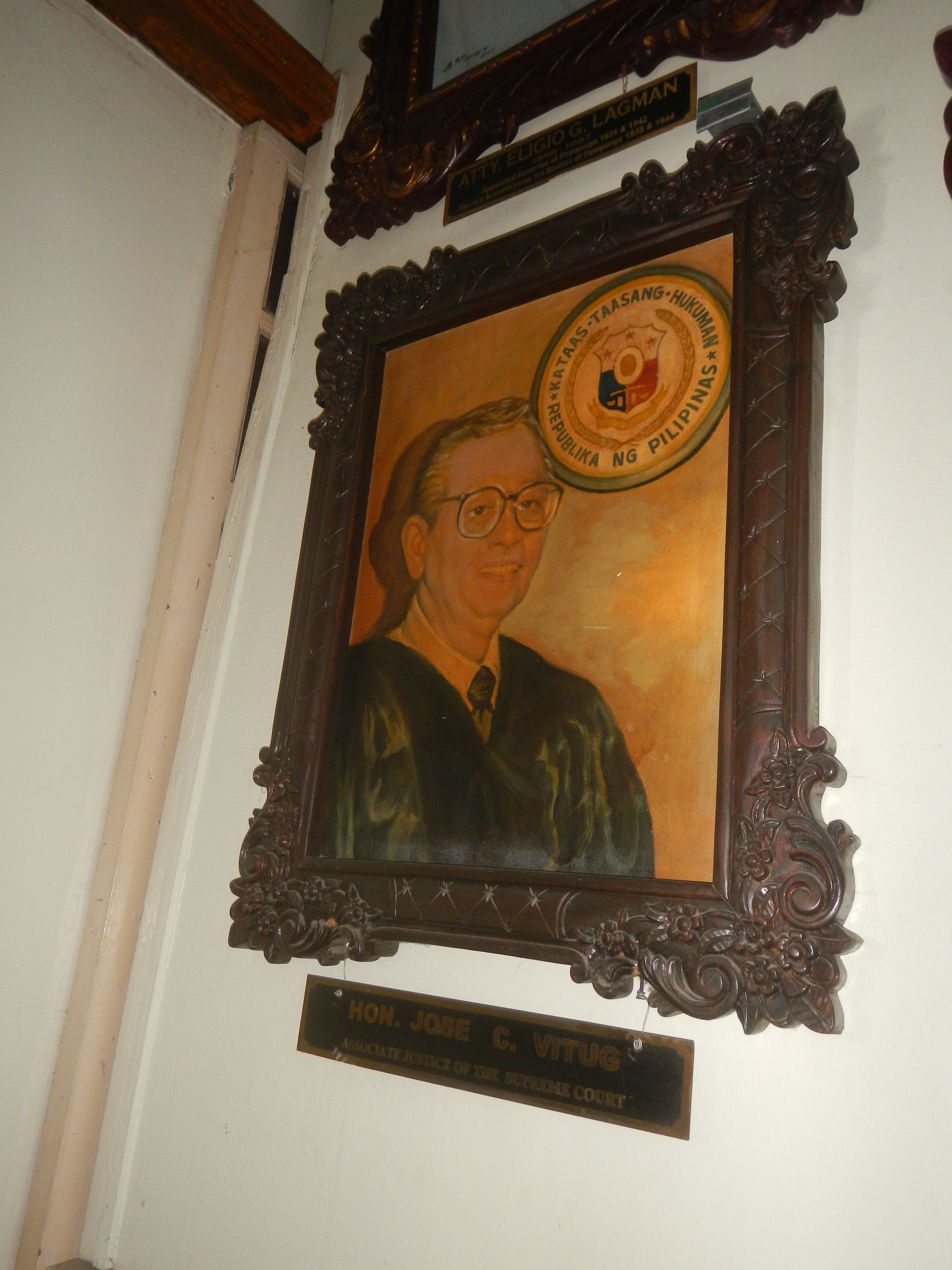
- Official portrait of Vitug

Dean of the Angeles University Foundation School of Law and Arellano University School of Law
- Incumbent
- Assumed office 2004

132nd Associate Justice of the Supreme Court of the Philippines
- In office June 28, 1993 – July 15, 2004
- Appointed by: Fidel Ramos
- Preceded by: Jose C. Campos
- Succeeded by: Cancio Garcia

Personal details
- Born: July 15, 1934 (age 92) Guagua, Pampanga
- Education: Guagua National Colleges
- Alma mater: Manuel L. Quezon University

Jose Cabrera Vitug Jr. (born July 15, 1934) is a Filipino lawyer and jurist who served as an Associate Justice of the Supreme Court of the Philippines. He was appointed to the Court on June 28, 1993 by President Fidel Ramos and retired on July 15, 2004.

Vitug was the founding dean of the Angeles University Foundation School of Law. He serves as an independent director Aboitiz Equity Ventures. He also served as the acting dean of Arellano University-School of Law

== Early life ==
He grew up and studied at Guagua National Colleges finishing as a top ranked student. Vitug then studied at Manuel L. Quezon University for law school finishing cum laude in 1956, and later got a master's degree in National Security Administration at the National Defense College of the Philippines.

== Legal career ==
Vitug started off as a technical assistant to Supreme Court Justice J.B.L. Reyes upon graduation. From then on, his career flourished and landed himself the position of the Associate Justice of the Supreme Court from 1993 to 2004. He also served as a Senior Professor of the Philippine Judicial Academy at the Supreme Court of the Philippines.

== Awards ==
He has received numerous awards including Outstanding Manilan, and Outstanding Kapampangan.

== Books ==
He has authored several books including Compendium of Tax Law and Jurisprudence (co-authored with Ernesto D. Acosta; Pandect of Commercial Law and Jurisprudence; Civil Code of the Philippines Annotated (4 Volumes); Commercial Laws of the Philippines (2 Volumes);and Compendium of Civil Code of the Philippines.

Legal offices
Preceded by Jose C. Campos	Associate Justice of the Supreme Court of the Philippines; 1993–2004	Succeeded by Cancio C. Garcia
