= Orlando Campos =

Indian bridge player (1925–1994)

Orlando "Ollie" Campos (1925–1994) was an Indian bridge player.

Campos was the mainstay of the famous Ruia team that dominated the Indian bridge scene from 1958 through the late seventies. He represented India in seven world championships and two zonal championships. His 22 national wins include open teams twice and open pairs once. He has been featured in many bridge publications, the most recent being a hand featured in the book Easier Done Than Said: Brilliancy at the Bridge Table by Dr. Prakash K. Paranjape. His most frequent partner was Ashok Ruia.

"Ollie", as he was popularly known was a fine technician and also one of the fastest players in the world. For a long time he held the record for the highest number of masterpoints in India.

== Personal anecdotes ==
Besides playing bridge, Campos also used to direct the game where he is fondly remembered for his ability to do matchpoint scores in "double-fast time." One of the funny memories of him is his tendency to relapse into, "Sorry, my fault – I am a palooka, you are expert," whenever he got riled by his partner.

On the way to a bridge event that he was attending, Ollie's flight got hijacked (c. 1984). Ultimately the hijackers were attacked by commandos, but at age 70+, Ollie was reportedly one of the first passengers to have escaped down the emergency chute.

He was a keen amateur philatelist whose specialization was "Early Indian First Day Cancellations."
