= Carlos Campos (clothing brand) =

Honduran-born fashion designer

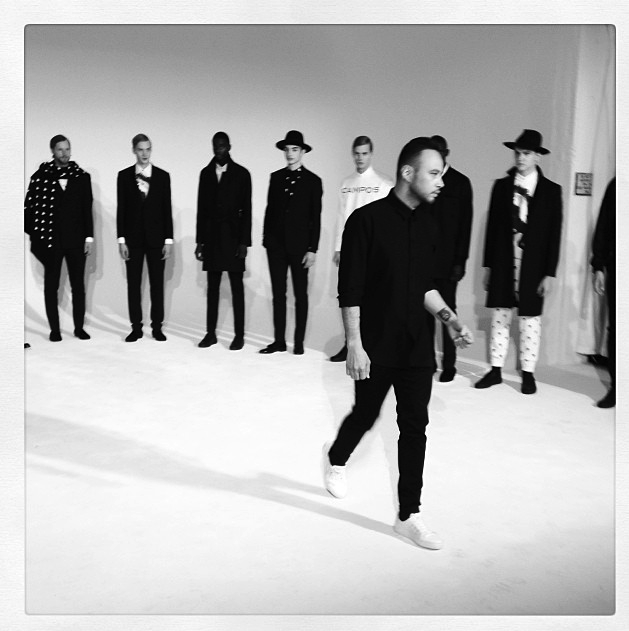
- Campos in 2014
- Type: Private Company
- Industry: Fashion
- Founded: 2007
- Headquarters: New York City, US
- Key people: Carlos Campos (founder)
- Products: Apparel
- Website: carloscampos.com

Carlos Campos (born 1972) is a Honduran-born fashion designer who launched his eponymous fashion brand in New York in 2006. The label is associated with men's suits. However, it launched its first womenswear collection during New York Fashion Week in 2008.

== History ==
Carlos Campos was born in Honduras and grew up in a tailoring and design household inspired by his father. After a few tailoring jobs in Brooklyn and a short-lived scarf and tie business, he enrolled at the Fashion Institute of Technology in New York at the age of 23.

Campos presented his own designs at the New York Fashion Week for the first time in 2001.

In 2006, he branched out his self-titled menswear label. He later co-founded a second imprint, Guido New York, opened his made-to-measure studio in New York City.

In September 2008 Carlos Campos presented his first womenswear collection at the Altman Building in Chelsea (New York City), including an all black female cast for his runway show. According to a release, the designer's inspiration was supermodel Iman and the collection was described as "Jet set rockstar - think David Bowie and Iman on Holiday in South France." The labels' Fall/Winter 2009 collection was perceived as provocative since it included military, church and sado-masochist wear elements.

== Philosophy and style ==
He described his style as "elegant jet-set rock star, with a romantic [twist]".

Carlos Campos designs have been worn by the likes of Justin Timberlake, Enrique Iglesias, Ethan Hawke, Scissors Sisters, Fall Out Boy, The Killers, Franz Ferdinand, and Ville Vallo. He has appeared on Style, VH1, ET, VOX, NEWS, CNN, and A&E. Photo editorials and features include national and international magazines such as DNR, Esquire, Numero, Homme, Flaunt, Details, Arena, Gotham, People, Time-Out New York, Out Magazine, Zink, and Entertainment weekly.

== Fashion ==
Women’s wear collections

- September 2008 – Main Collection, S/S 2009, David Bowie & Iman
- February 2009 - Main Collection, F/W 2009, Uniform inspired (military, church elements, sado-machist wear)
- September 2009 – Main Collection, S/S 2010, Art Deco style
- February 2010 – Main Collection, F/W 2010, Modern Mariachi

Men’s wear collections

- September 2006 – Main Collection, S/S 2007
- February 2007 – Main Collection, W/F 2007
- September 2007 – Main Collection, S/S 2008
- February 2008 – Main Collection, F/W 2008
- September 2008 – Main Collection, S/S 2009, David Bowie & Iman
- February 2009 - Main Collection, F/W 2009, Uniform inspired (military, church elements, sado-machist wear)
- February 2010 – Main Collection, F/W 2010, Mariachi inspired.
- Fall/Winter 2014. New York, February 2014
- Spring/Summer 2014. New York, September 2013
- Fall/Winter 2013. New York, February 2013
- Spring/Summer 2013. New York, September 2012

== Partnerships/ collaborations ==
The label collaborated in 2008 with the J Shoes label and created a shoe line for its Spring/Summer 2009 collection.

In 2009, a collaboration with Jewellery Designer Dannijo was arranged to complete the outfits at the Summer/ Spring 2010 presentation in New York.

== Awards ==
- 2009 The Fashion Group International’s Rising Star for Menswear
- 2011 Vogue/CFDA Fashion Fund Award - FINALIST
- 2013 Vanidades Icon Of Style For Menswear Award.

== Collaborations ==
In 2010, he collaborated with architect Santiago Calatrava and Christopher Wheeldon, on costumes for “Estancias”, Calatrava and Campos’ first project for the New York City Ballet. This was his first collaboration project as a solo costume designer.

== Charity ==
The Carlos Campos Foundation in Honduras is responsible for assisting single mothers with resources from childcare to job training.

The label also cooperates with “Aid for AIDS”, a non-profit organization committed to improving the quality of life of people living with HIV/AIDS in Latin America and the Caribbean.

Carlos Campos is also a founder member of Honduras Global, an organization dedicated to link leading Hondurans abroad and their expertise to help share knowledge and experience for beneficial purposes to young local Hondurans.
