= Carlos Campos (politician) =

Venezuelan politician

Governor of Anzoátegui

Personal details
- Born: 30/08/1929 Barcelona
- Died: June 28, 2018 Lecheria, Venezuela
- Party: Copei
- Spouse: Zoraida Cedeño

Carlos Campos (died June 28, 2018) was a Venezuelan politician, trade union leader, and former President of the Anzoátegui chapter of Copei, a Christian democratic political party. Campos served as both the former Governor of Anzoátegui, as well as the former President of the Legislative Assembly of Anzoátegui during his career.

Campos had suffered from heart arrhythmia since 2012 and suffered from serious health problems since 2016.

Campos died from health complications on Thursday night, June 28, 2018. His funeral was held at the Funeraria Vallés in the Anzoátegui state capital of Barcelona on Friday, June 29, 2018. el ex gobernador y diputado Carlos Campos fue además socio del también fallecido y reconocido radiodifusor Fernando Zaurin en el Circuito Radial Orbita que incluían Órbita 97.3 en el tigre, Órbita 96.3 en Anaco, Órbita 107.5 en Puerto la Cruz, Radio Guanipa 1350 y Radio Bahía 1430 AM también en Puerto la Cruz Estado Anzoátegui.
