= Daniel Campos (disambiguation) =

Daniel Campos Province is a province in the north-western parts of the Bolivian Potosí Department.

Daniel Campos may also refer to:

- Daniel Campos (footballer) (born 1981), Chilean footballer
- Cloud (dancer) (born 1983), born Daniel Campos, American dancer
- Daniel Campos-Hull (born 1989), Spanish race car driver
