= Tatica Campos =

Cuban baseball player (born 1892)

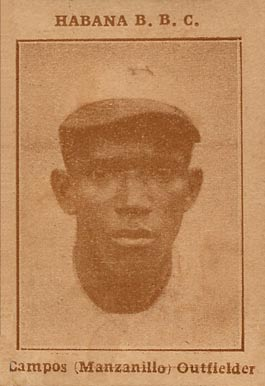
- Pitcher / First baseman / Corner outfielder
- Born: January 27, 1892; Guira de Melena, Cuba
- Died: Unknown
- Batted: Right Threw: Right

Negro league baseball debut
- 1911, for the América Park

Last appearance
- 1922, for the Cuban Stars (East)

Teams
- América Park (1911–1912); Habana (1912); Almendares (1913); San Francisco (1915); San Francisco Park (1915); Almendares Park (1915–1916); Cuban Stars (1916–1920); Atlantic City Bacharach Giants (1920–1921); Cuban Stars (East) (1921–1922); Stars of Cuba (1930)

Francisco "Tatica" Campos Toledo (January 27, 1892 – death date unknown) was a Cuban professional baseball pitcher, first baseman and corner outfielder in the Negro leagues and the Cuban League. He played from 1911 to 1922, then again in 1930, with several teams.
