= Estelito Mendoza =

Filipino lawyer and politician (1930–2025)

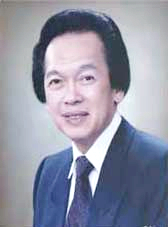
- Official portrait, c. 1970s

Minister of Justice
- In office June 30, 1984 – February 27, 1986
- President: Ferdinand Marcos
- Prime Minister: Cesar Virata
- Preceded by: Ricardo C. Puno
- Succeeded by: Neptali Gonzales

Governor of Pampanga
- In office November 19, 1985 – February 25, 1986
- Preceded by: Cicero Punsalan
- Succeeded by: Bren Guiao
- In office March 3, 1980 – June 30, 1984
- Vice Governor: Cicero Punsalan
- Preceded by: Juanita L. Nepomuceno
- Succeeded by: Cicero Punsalan

Mambabatas Pambansa from Region III
- In office June 12, 1978 – January 30, 1980

Solicitor General of the Philippines
- In office July 1, 1972 – February 25, 1986
- President: Ferdinand Marcos
- Preceded by: Felix Q. Antonio
- Succeeded by: Sedfrey Ordoñez

Personal details
- Born: January 5, 1930 Manila, Philippine Islands
- Died: March 26, 2025 (aged 95)
- Party: NPC (1992); KBL (1978–1986)
- Spouse: Rosa Adams
- Children: 5
- Education: University of the Philippines College of Law (LLB); Harvard Law School (LLM)
- Occupation: Politician
- Profession: Lawyer

Estelito "Titong" Patdu Mendoza (January 5, 1930 – March 26, 2025) was a Filipino lawyer who served as Solicitor General of the Philippines from 1972 to 1986. As Solicitor General, he successfully defended the validity of the 1973 Constitution of the Philippines in the Ratification Cases. He was the Chairman of the United Nations General Assembly Legal Committee in 1976. He also served as Minister of Justice from 1984 to 1986, Member of the Batasang Pambansa from 1978 to 1980 and 1984 to 1986, and provincial governor of Pampanga from 1980 to 1984 and from 1985 to 1986. He was also the founding partner of Estelito P. Mendoza and Associates. In his long trial-lawyer career, he was dubbed as the "Attorney of Last Resort."

== Early life and education ==
Estelito Mendoza was born on January 5, 1930, in Manila. Estelito Mendoza was the eldest child of Guillermo Dizon Mendoza and Barbara Lugue Patdu both from Bacolor, Pampanga and both were public school teachers. Mendoza's father retired as Chief of the Craftsman Division, Bureau of Public Schools, and his mother as Home Economics Supervisor of Bulacan and Bataan.

He received his secondary education from UP High School in 1946. Later, he received a Bachelor of Laws degree cum laude from the University of the Philippines College of Law in 1952 and a Master of Laws degree from Harvard Law School in 1954. He was a member of Upsilon Sigma Phi fraternity, as well as the Phi Kappa Phi and Pi Gamma Mu honor societies.

He was conferred with a Doctor of Laws (LLD) (honoris causa) by Central Colleges of the Philippines in 1975, Hanyang University in Seoul, Korea in 1978, University of Manila in 1985, Angeles University Foundation in 1997, and University of the East in 2004.

== Public service and foreign affairs ==
Aside from his service as Solicitor General, Minister of Justice, Member of the Batasang Pambansa, Governor of Pampanga, and Chairmanship of the Sixth (Legal) Committee, 31st Session in 1976, UN General Assembly, he also served as Chairman of the Special Committee (of the UN) on the Charter of the United Nations and the Strengthening of the Role of the Organization in 1980. As Solicitor General, he was instrumental in defending the regime of President Ferdinand Marcos during the martial law era, including in the Javellana vs Executive Secretary case that led to the Supreme Court upholding the 1973 Constitution.

As member of the Batasang Pambansa, Mendoza sponsored vital pieces of legislation such as BP 20 which organized regional assemblies in Regions 9 and 12, BP 52 which called for local elections in 1980 and BP 68, the Corporation Code of 1980.

He was also a member of the faculty of the University of the Philippines College of Law from 1954 to 1974, teaching subjects in both public and private law and participating in several law reform projects. He also authored legal articles and papers. He was also a member of the University of the Philippines Board of Regents from 1979 to 1985, and President of the University of the Philippines Alumni Association from 1979 to 1985.

He was also the Philippine Representative to the Asian-African Legal Consultative Committee from 1972 to 1979, Vice Chairman of the Philippine Delegation to the UN Seabed Committee and to the Conference on the Law of the Sea from 1971 to 1981.

He also served as Philippine representative to several multilateral and bilateral conferences and meetings which included, among others, UN Conference on the Law of Treaties in 1968 and 1969, negotiations with the US government on the amendment of the US-Philippine Military Bases Agreement from 1971 to 1978, the proposed US-Philippine Extradition Treaty in 1981, and Special Counsel on Marine and Ocean Concerns in 2010.

== Notable cases and private practice ==
Known as "the lawyer of last resort," Mendoza gained the reputation of defending high-profile controversial and unpopular clients. He served as chief counsel for Joseph Estrada during his impeachment trial which culminated in the Second EDSA Revolution. He also served as counsel of Ferdinand Marcos, his wife Imelda, and cronies Lucio Tan, Roberto Ongpin, and Danding Cojuangco in various cases for sequestered wealth. Mendoza also advocated for 2004 presidential candidate Fernando Poe Jr. when the latter's citizenship was questioned before the Supreme Court of the Philippines. Mendoza successfully demonstrated that Poe was in fact a natural-born Filipino. Before the Supreme Court, Mendoza successfully defended former president Gloria Macapagal Arroyo in her case for plunder in the Philippine Charity Sweepstakes Office fund scam. Furthermore, in the ruling allowing President Arroyo to appoint Renato Corona as Chief Justice, the Supreme Court used Mendoza's arguments in holding that the appointment was not covered by the prohibition on midnight appointments.

Mendoza also secured before the Supreme Court a bail grant for plunder defendant former senator Juan Ponce Enrile who was implicated in the multi-billion-peso pork barrel scam of Janet Lim-Napoles. In the anti-graft court Sandiganbayan, Mendoza got Senator Bong Revilla acquitted of plunder who was implicated in the same pork barrel scam. In the labor dispute involving Philippine Airlines (PAL) and the retrenchment of 5,000 of its employees, Mendoza represented PAL before the Supreme Court, winning the case for PAL. Mendoza also won as lawyer of the municipalities in League of Cities of the Philippines v. COMELEC involving the constitutionality of 16 cityhood bills. He also got Jaime Dichaves's plunder case dismissed by the anti-graft court Sandiganbayan. Dichaves was co-accused in former president Joseph Estrada's plunder case stemming from the 2001 Jose Velarde scandal.

In corporate practice, Estelito Mendoza was Non-Executive Director of Petron Corporation since January 8, 2009. He was also a member of the Board of Directors of San Miguel Corporation and Philippine National Bank (PNB). He previously served as a Director of Meralco. He was engaged in the practice of law for more than 60 years, and operated his own firm, Estelito P. Mendoza and Associates.

== Personal life and death ==
Mendoza was married to Rosa Fernan Adams and had five children.

Mendoza died on March 26, 2025, at the age of 95.

== Awards ==
On June 28, 2010, Mendoza received a Presidential Medal of Merit as Special Counsel on Marine and Ocean Concerns and was also awarded by the University of the Philippines Alumni Association its 1975 "Professional Award in Law" and in 2013 its "Lifetime Distinguished Achievement Award".

He was consistently listed as a "Leading Individual in Dispute Resolution" among lawyers in the Philippines in the following directories/journals: "The Asia Legal 500", "Chambers of Asia", and "Which Lawyer?" yearbooks for several years.
