= Javier Campos =

Javier F. Campos (born 1947) is a Chilean writer and professor of Latin American Literature, Hispanic Film, Popular Culture, Politics, Culture Studies related to Latin America at Fairfield University in Fairfield, Connecticut, United States of America.

Campos is a regular columnist for El Mostrador, a Latin American newspaper. He writes about several issues including social, political and culture issues in Latin America, and Latinos in the United States. Campos also writes for Sociedad & Conocimiento, a magazine from Department of Economics at the Universidad Central de Chile.

== Short biography ==
Campos was born in Santiago, Chile. He was raised by a single mother with indigenous heritage who worked at a hotel as a domestic worker.

He has published a novel, Los Saltimbanquis (1999) and poetry books, including Las últimas fotografías (The Last Photographs) (1981), La ciudad en llamas (The City in Flames) (1986), and Cartas olvidadas del astronauta (The Astronaut’s Forgotten Letters) (1991). Cartas olvidadas del astronauta won the first Hispanic Poetry Prize at the Letras de Oro Literary Awards in the U.S. in 1991.

In 1990, Campos was a finalist for the Casa de las Américas Prize with El astronauta en llamas (The Astronaut in Flames). The book was later translated into English by W. Nick Hill as Letter from a Lost Astronaut.

In 2000, American poetry magazine Mid-American Review dedicated a chapbook in translation to Campos' poetry. In May 2003, a German journal dedicated a chapbook to the translation of Campos’ poetry into German.

In December 2002, Campos won the first poetry prize in the long poem category at Radio France Internationale’s International Juan Rulfo Prize Contest, for his poem titled "Los Gatos."

In 2003, he published his first short stories collection about Latinos in the U.S., La mujer que se parecía a Sharon Stone (The Woman Who Looked Like Sharon Stone). The book won a Second Award in August 2004 for the best short story book published in Chile in 2003. Read here some short stories: La mujer que se parecía a Sharon Stone https://web.archive.org/web/20050507080355/http://www.rileditores.cl/articulo/Articulo.do?m=ver&idArticulo=1069168718101

Campos received a prize for his new poetry book at the Chicano/Latino Literary Prize, University of California, Irvine in October 2005.
