= Valerie Campos =

Mexican artist

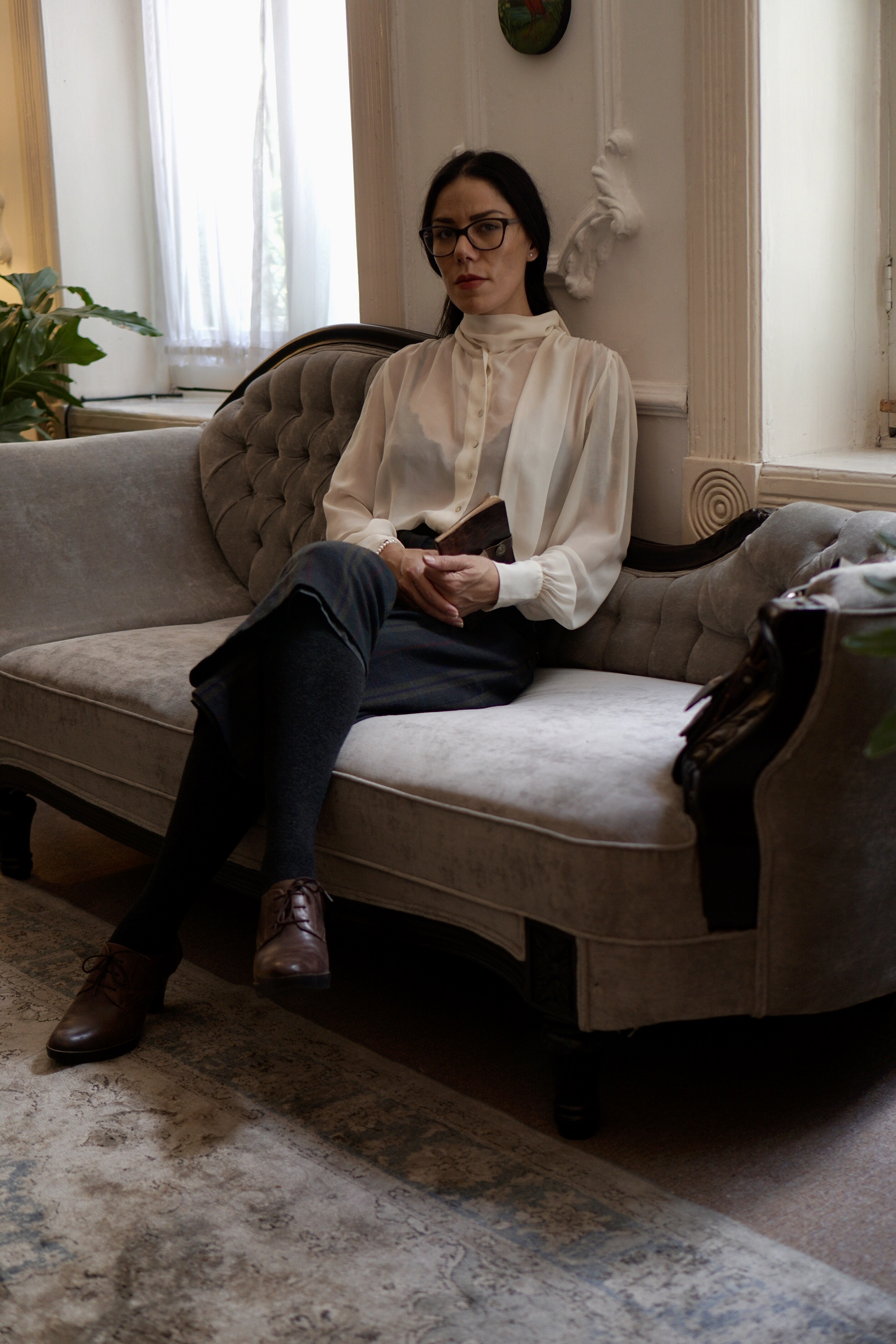
- Born: Valerie Campos Maldonado; December 25, 1983 (age 42); Mexico City, Mexico

Valerie Campos is a self-taught artist born in Mexico City (1983) and raised in Los Angeles, California, where her first visual influences were street art and Lowbrow. Inspired by a wide range of musical genres, Valerie paints sonorous and organic spaces, combining abstract and figurative elements, that she fragments and reproduces in a kaleidoscope-like manner. Nakedness and transparency of desire, and the flight of eroticism, serves as conductive threads of an iconic grammar made of conceptual and sensitive-sensual forms.

== Art career ==
Since the beginning of her career, Valerie Campos has strived to reconcile representations from very different origins, to transversalize the contents and principles that determine individual, community and social behaviors. Thus, universal symbols cohabit the length and breadth of her work, sometimes being more evident, and at other times almost subliminal presences, which fuse elements from the high Mesoamerican cultures, in particular the hieroglyphics of the Mayan and Mixtec codices, along with caricatures and their capacity for synthetic communication.

Campos has exhibited her work in various solo and group shows in Europe, North America, and Asia. She has been awarded various national and international grants, such as the National System of Art Creators (Sistema Nacional de Creadores de Arte 2020) and the Young Creators Program (Programa de Jóvenes Creadores 2014/15) in Mexico; Back to Basic, Finland in 2019; the K.I.A.R Odisha program, India in 2019; Glo Árt, Laneken, Belgium in 2017; LAC, Kansas City, United States in 2014/15; Xu Yuan Centre, Beijing, China in 2013/14; Red Gate Gallery, Beijing, China in 2013; and Banff Centre for the Arts, Canada in 2011. Her work has been selected in competitions and biennials including the Film Festival KC 2015; 1st International Biennial of Engraving José Guadalupe Posada 2013 and the International Festival of Contemporary Art Alpilles-Provence, France, 2014.

In addition to her artistic achievements, Campos has developed cross-cultural projects in the arts. In 2014, with the support of Francisco Toledo, she founded the Nao Now project to promote cultural exchanges between Mexico, China and the US. In 2020, She founded Vaivén Collectors, a non-profit association that produces short-form documentaries, academic essays, and arts events to disseminate, promote and open dialogues on contemporary art in Mexico.

Valerie Campos currently lives and works in Mexico City and New York. She holds a scholarship from the National System of Art Creators (SNCA), an award given by the Mexican Ministry of Culture to artists with a robust professional trajectory.

== Education ==
- 2019 Diploma in Cultural and Media Management
- 2014 Cultural exchange between China, Latin America University of Kansas, Lawrence, KS

== Professional appointments ==
- 2021 – Present Co-Founder Vaiven Collectors A. C Mexico City.
- 2015 Lecturer, Cultural exchange between China, Latin America University of Kansas, Lawrence, KS.
- 2014 Curator Associate, XU YUANG CENTER, Beijing, China.

== Grants and awards ==
- 2020-23 Member of The National System of Art Creators (SNCA) Individual Artist Fellowship for Evocations, Resonances and Fantasies.
- 2017 GLOART Foundation Visual Arts Award Artist in residency for Spiritual Landscapes
- 2014-15 Lawrence Arts Center, Kansas. Artist in Residency Award for Natural Selection, The Pursuit of Happiness. USA 2014-2015
- 2014-15 National Program of Young Artists for Natural Selection, FONCA, Mexico
- 2014 Intercultural Exchange Grant, Artist in Residence, Xu Yuan Centre, Beijing China.
- 2014 Winner: Museum of Oaxacan Painters Oaxaca, Mexico for The 4th Elements.
- 2013 Winner: Curator Grant, Xu Yuan Centre, Beijing China for NAO- NOW, LOST HORIZON.
- 2013 Artist Grant, Red Gate Gallery de Beijing, China for Amazing Stories.
- 2013 Winner: Leighton Colony, Artist in Residence, México-Canadá. Fonca-Banff.

== Selected exhibitions ==
- "VÉRTIGO, 2024" La Máquina Taller de gráfica, Oaxaca, México
- "VORTEX, 2024" WEXLER GALLERY, Philadelphia, USA
- "OSMOSIS, 2024" WEXLER GALLERY, New York, USA
- "ANALOGÍAS, 2024" Galeria M5CONTEMPO, Oaxaca, México
- "ART FAIR CHICAGO, 2023" WEXLER GALLERY, Chicago, USA
- "SALON ART+DESIGN, 2022" Park Avenue, New York, USA
- "THE END, 2016" Museo de Arte Contemporáneo de San Luis Potosí, México
- "THE JOURNEY, 2016" Galeria Quetzalli, Oaxaca, México
- "NEVER ENDING STORIES, 2016" Heart Ego Gallery, Monterrey N.L. México
- "CUENTOS SUBTERRÁNEOS DEL ETERNO RETORNO, 2016" Museo de Arte Contemporáneo de Oaxaca, México
- "NATURAL SELECTION –THE PURSUIT OF HAPPINESS, 2016" Lawrence Arts Center Gallery, Lawrence Kansas, USA
- "EL PAÍS DEL NUNCA JAMÁS, 2015" Polyforum Alfaro Siqueiros, México DF, México
- "LOS 4 ELEMENTOS, 2013" Museo de los Pintores Oaxaqueños, Oaxaca, México
- "INTERVENCIONES DEL MUNDO FLOTANTE, 2013" Instituto de Artes Gráficas de Oaxaca, México
- "AMAZING STORIES, LOS 4 ELEMENTOS, 2013" Red Gate Gallery, Beijing, China
- "WHERE THE DREAMS COME TRUE, 2013" Centro Cultural Jaime Sabiens, Tuxtla, Chiapas, México
- "WHERE THE DREAMS COME TRUE, 2012" Galería Ramón Alva de la Cana, Xalapa, Veracruz, México
- "I WANT TO BELIEVE, 2011" Van! Centre for the Arts, Canadá
- "WHERE THE DREAMS COME TRUE, 2011" Museo de los Pintores Oaxaqueños, Oaxaca, México
- "NATURALEZA MUERTA, 2011" Quetzalli, Oaxaca, México
- "IRREVERSIBLE, 2007" Galería Quetzalli, Oaxaca, México

== Commissions ==
- 2019 MINART FOUNDATION Art Commission, The Last Supper, oil/ canvas 80 in x 198 in.
- 2020 DPF Collection, Art Commission, Mutatio, Oil/linen 27 x 23in, Merge, Oil/linen 27 x 23 in.
- 2018 Black Coffee, Art Commission, Still life, 78 in x 83 in. oil/ canvas, Guadalajara, Mexico.

== Collections ==
- 2014 Graphic Arts Institute of Oaxaca. IAGO. Oaxaca, Mexico.
- 2018 National Museum of Prints, Mexico City, Nao Now Mexico-Beijing 2014
- 2021 Chirhart Collection, Baltimore, USA
- 2020 David P.Feregrino Collection, Queretaro, Mexico
- 2023 Solivagus Collection, Guadalajara, Mexico
- 2017 MINART Foundation Collection, Guaddalajara, Mexico.

== Publications ==
- Where Dreams Come True
- Amazing Stories · The 4 Elements with a run of 300 copies, each with the original charcoal drawings. Editorial Coordinator: Daniel Molina. Design and layout: Alfonso Morales. Photo: Daniel Molina. Curatorial text: Paul J. Rico. Texts: Valerie Fields.

== Links ==
- Official website
- https://www.vaivencollectors.com/valerie-campos-se
- https://www.vaivencollectors.com/inicio-eng

== Press ==
- Beijing Today
- China Daily
- La Jornada
- La Otra Magazine
- Excelsior
