= Liliana Campos =

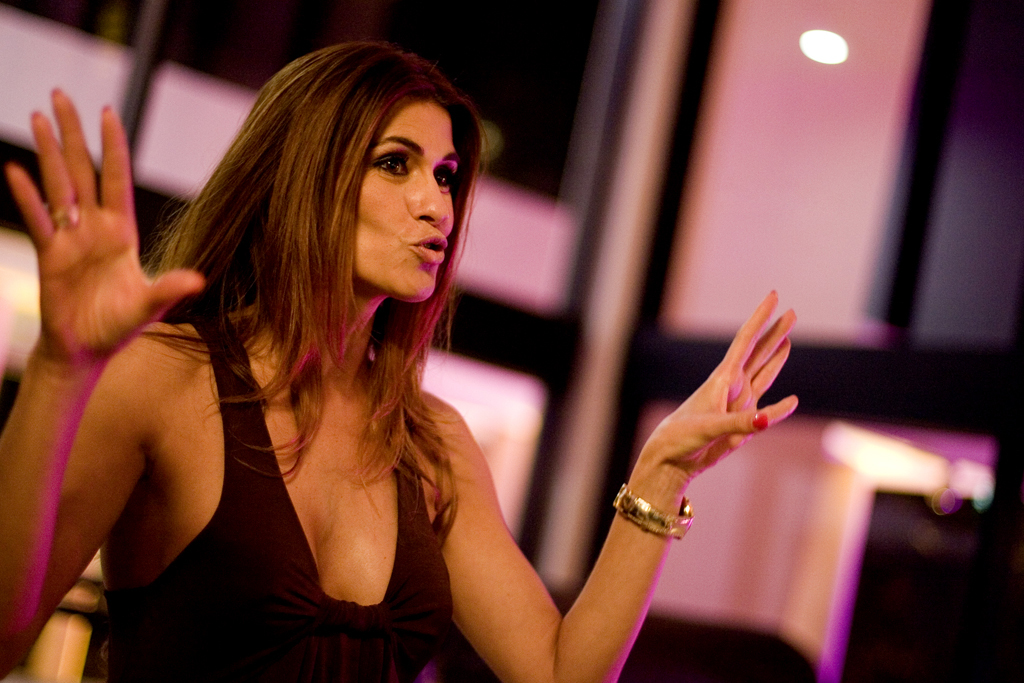
Liliana Campos

Liliana Campos (born 27 April 1971) is a Portuguese television presenter and fashion model. She has a degree in international relations, and started her professional career at SIC television in Portugal.

She is married to Rodrigo Herédia.

Among SIC's television shows she participated in are O Juiz Decide, Mundo VIP, Campeões Nacionais, Flash, Êxtase, Animais de Quatro Patas and Fama Show.
