= Guagua =

Municipality in Pampanga, Philippines

Guagua Uaua
- Municipality
- Municipality of Guagua
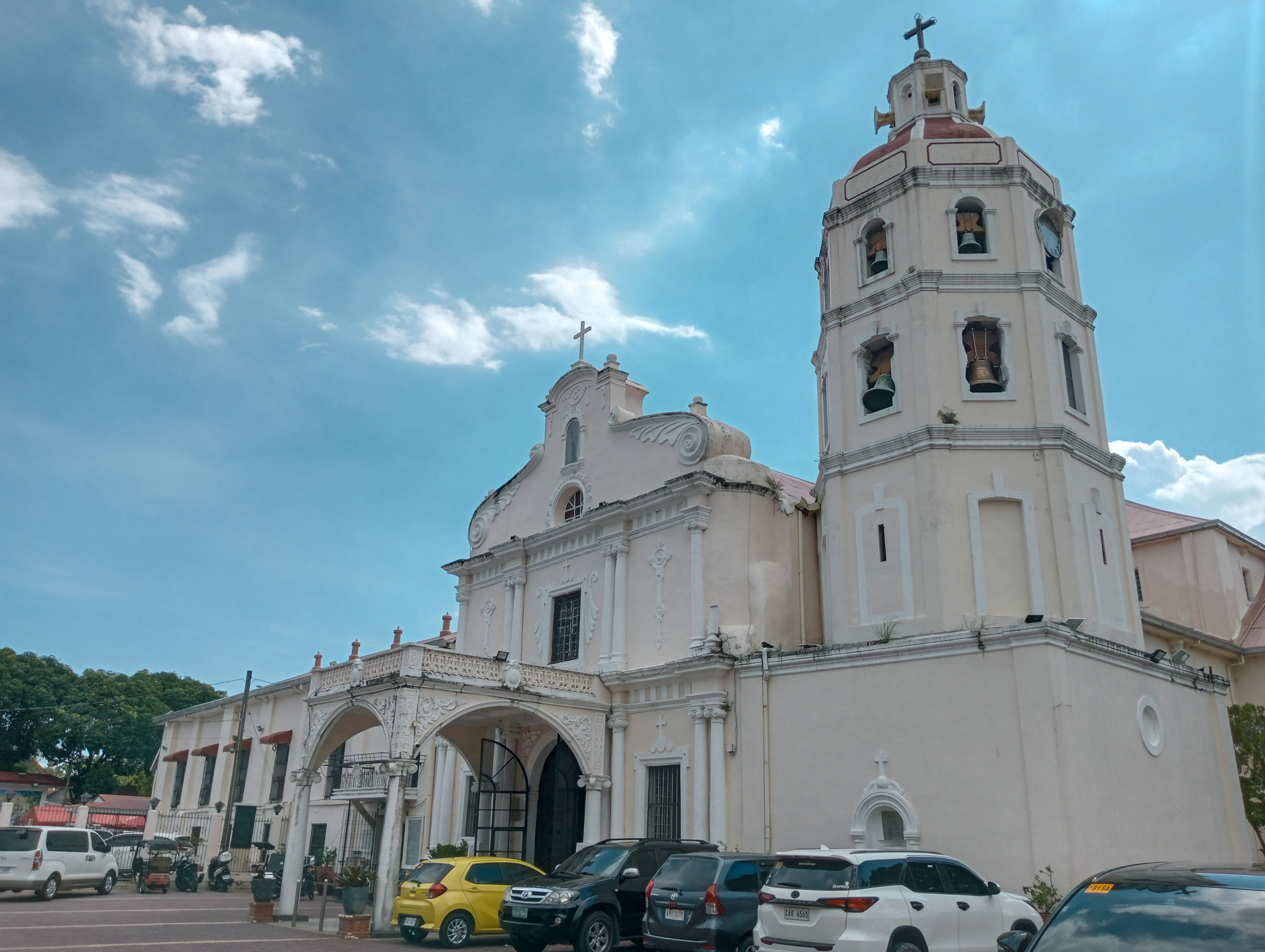
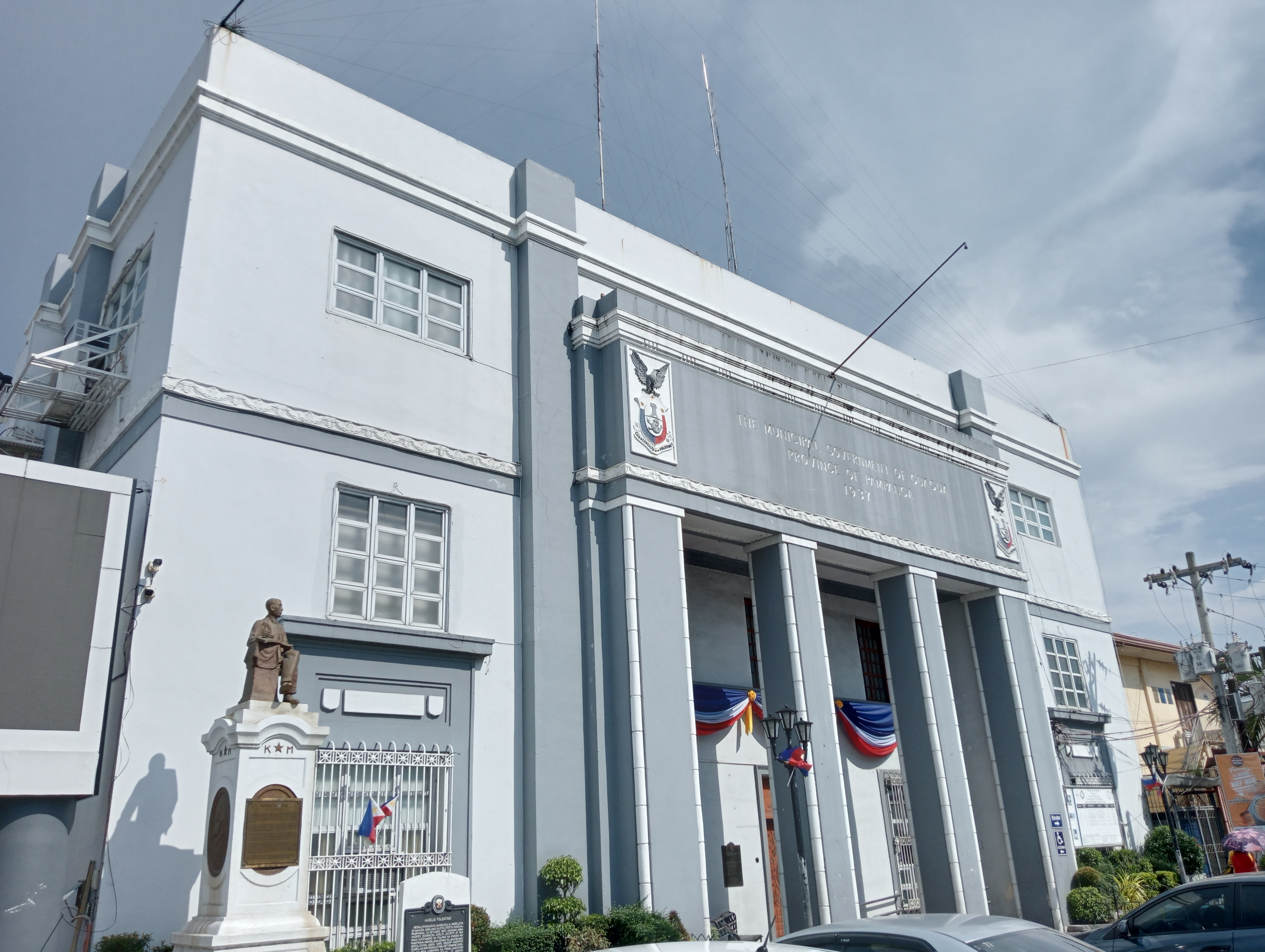
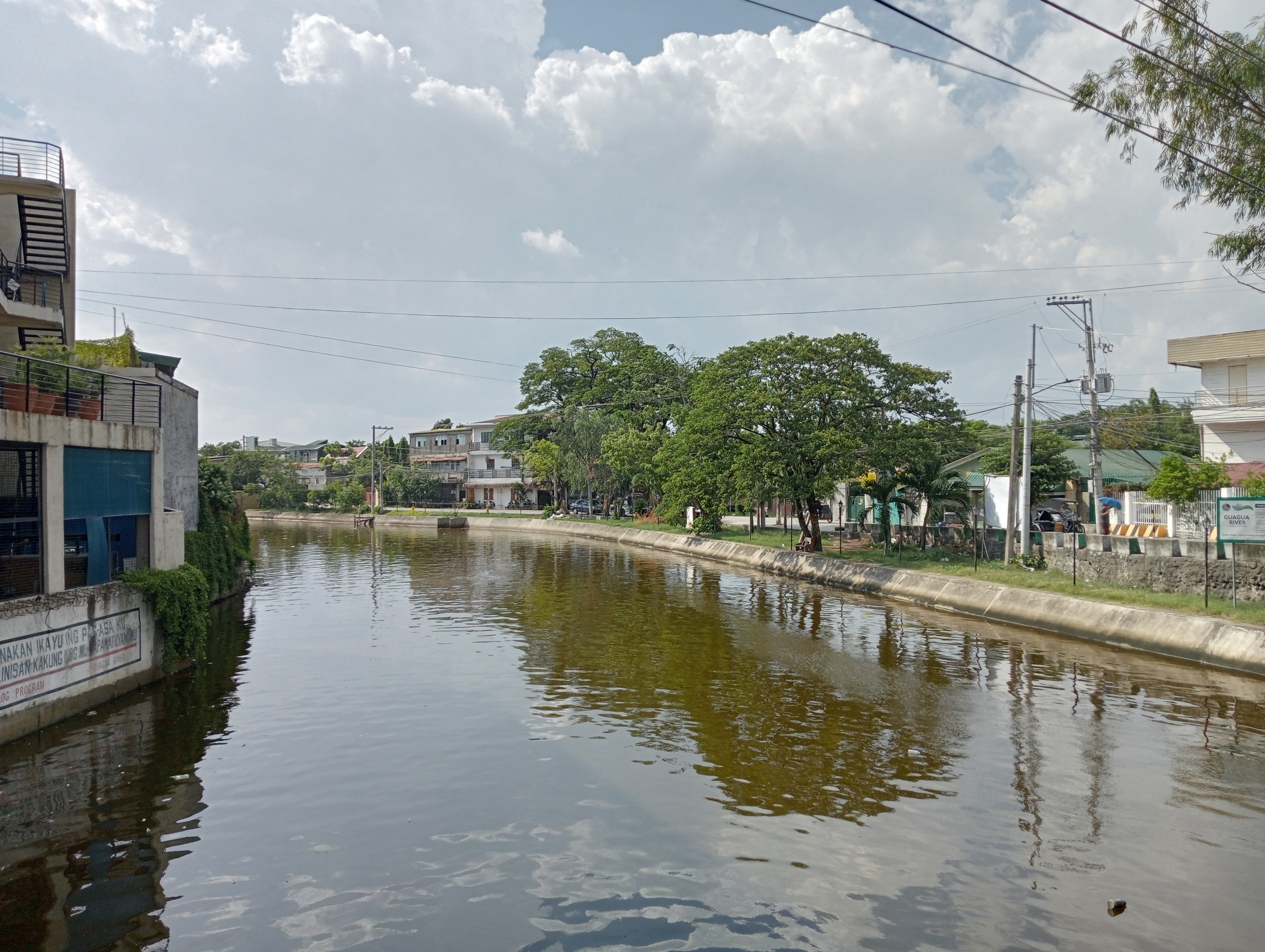
- Betis Church Old Guagua Municipal Hall Guagua River

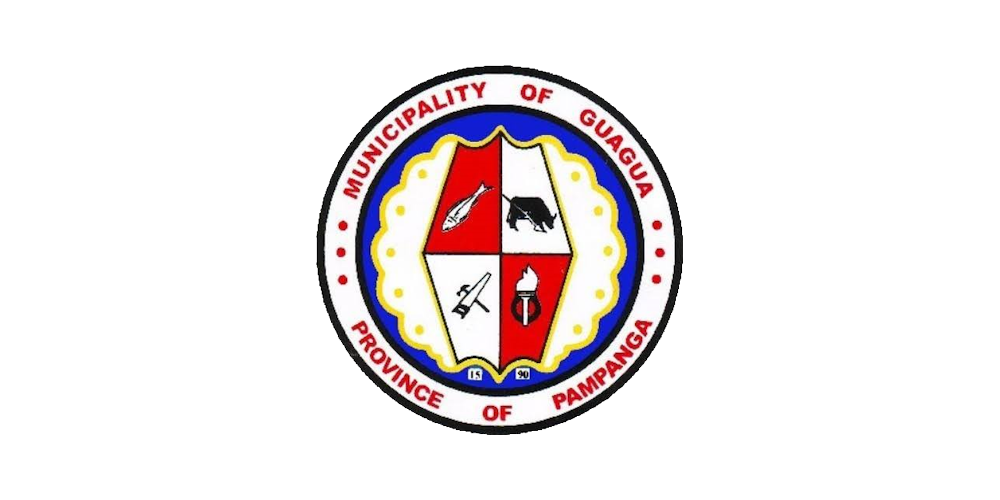
- Flag

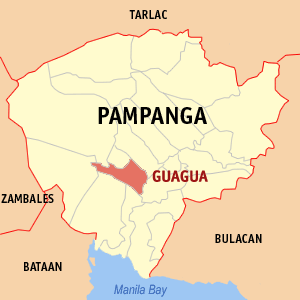
- Map of Pampanga with Guagua highlighted
- Interactive map of Guagua
- Location within the Philippines
- Coordinates: 14°58′N 120°38′E
- Country: Philippines
- Region: Central Luzon
- Province: Pampanga
- District: 2nd district
- Founded: May 15, 1590
- Barangays: 31 (see Barangays)

Government
  - Type: Sangguniang Bayan
  - Mayor: Anthony Joseph S. Torres
  - Vice Mayor: Benjamin L. Lim Jr.
  - Representative: Gloria Macapagal Arroyo
  - Municipal Council: Members: Joan M. Carreon; Roanne Leonila R. Enriquez; Michelle R. Corpuz; Michael C. Magiliman; Amos R. Guilas; Jovy D. Tulio; Eugene Paul E. Ponio; Homer D. Garcia
  - Electorate: 66,883 voters (2025)

Area
  - Total: 48.67 km^{2} (18.79 sq mi)
- Elevation: 21 m (69 ft)
- Highest elevation: 224 m (735 ft)
- Lowest elevation: −3 m (−9.8 ft)

Population (2024 census)
  - Total: 137,948
  - Density: 2,834/km^{2} (7,341/sq mi)
  - Households: 29,853
- Demonym(s): English: Guaguan; Spanish: guagüeño -a

Economy
  - Income class: 1st municipal income class
  - Poverty incidence: 5.71% (2023)
  - Revenue: ₱ 501.4 million (2024)
  - Assets: ₱ 860.5 million (2024)
  - Expenditure: ₱ 424.8 million (2024)
  - Liabilities: ₱ 196.7 million (2024)

Service provider
  - Electricity: Pampanga 2 Electric Cooperative (PELCO 2)
- Time zone: UTC+8 (PST)
- ZIP code: 2003
- PSGC: 0305407000
- IDD : area code: +63 (0)45
- Native languages: Kapampangan; Tagalog
- Website: www.guagua.gov.ph

Guagua, officially the Municipality of Guagua (Kapampangan: Balen ning Guagua; Tagalog: Bayan ng Guagua), is a municipality in the province of Pampanga, Philippines. According to the 2024 census, it has a population of 137,948 people.

== Etymology ==
Wawa, which means "river mouth" (Kapampangan: alua or bukana), was the earliest recorded form of the town's name according to records dating back to 1590. The town is strategically located along a river which gave it a vital role in trade and transportation during the precolonial era and turned it into a prosperous settlement, as affirmed by archeological artifacts excavated in a nearby town. Some time after Spanish colonists took control of the town in 1561, it began to be known as Guagua, which is a Hispanized form of the original name.

== History ==
=== Early history ===
Early inhabitants opted to stay in the town because it was here that they could engage in barter trade with people from different islands, along with other means of livelihood like fishing and farming. The navigable river with which the town was endowed allowed shipping vessels to transport commodities to and from other chief localities, particularly Manila.

=== Spanish colonial era ===
The first cargo boat to arrive in Guagua was the Doña Dominga on May 7, 1884. Much later it was followed by the steamships Kaibigan and Kababayan, which anchored at the pier in Bgy Santo Niño, better known as the Yañgco Landing.

In 1892, when the Manila–Mabalacat railroad was inaugurated, Guagua was virtually the port of embarkation to and from Manila that served the province. The Chinese have long been part in Guagua's social and economic mainstream.

In the 18th century, they sought refuge in the town to escape discrimination and persecution in Manila. After their near-total slaughter, the Chinese lived in relative peace while they freely practiced their craft and mingled hand-in-hand with the local residents. The Chinese residents were merchants, masons, woodcarvers, carpenters, agriculturists and labourers. Their influence on the cultural and economic life of Guagua cannot be overlooked. The town could not have prospered so well without the economic services provided by the Chinese.

The town took significant part in the revolutionary struggles against the foreign intruders. A house near a church was made a secret cell of the Katipuneros in August 1897.

In March 1898, a massacre of all Spanish sympathizers in Guagua marked the end of Spanish colonialism and the outset of American rule. Moreover, during the Philippine–American War and the ensuing Second World War, Guagua became an important battleground.

=== American colonial era ===
At the turn of the twentieth century, a new system of education was introduced and made popular and available to the Filipinos. The Guagua Elementary School in Barangay Santa Filomena, is believed to be the first to be established in the town in 1901. Later in that year, an English teacher came to Betis district and opened a primary school which functioned on a regular basis. During that period, the town of Betis to the east was abolished, turning into a township of Guagua.

In 1908, Colegio del Sagrado Corazón de Jesús (now Saint Mary's Academy) in Barangay San Roque was established in a two-storey building in downtown, donated by a charitable matron.

Commercial activities further intensified when the San Fernando–Guagua line of the railroad was chartered on November 17, 1907.

In 1918, Guagua National Institute (now Guagua National Colleges) in Barangay Santa Filomena was founded in the convento of the local church. Further, in 1941, the then-parish priest felt the need for another high school in town, so he opened Saint Michael's College.

=== Philippine independence ===
In November 1959, nine rural barrios (now barangays) of Guagua were granted a 50-year electrification franchise, with the electricity provided by the National Power Corporation.

At the overthrow of the Marcos dictatorship in 1986, the local government carried out a sustainable development program to address the town's destitute state. From its income classification in 1986 as a third-class municipality, Guagua grew to a first-class one. Guagua garnered several outstanding citations for its achievement, including of several "Most Outstanding LGU" awards.

Guagua was severely devastated by the eruption of Mount Pinatubo in 1991.

== Geography ==
Guagua is bounded on the north by the towns of Bacolor and Santa Rita; on the south by the towns of Sasmuan and Lubao; on the east, Macabebe and Sasmuan; and on the west, Porac and Floridablanca.

It is 10 kilometres (6.2 mi) from the capital city of San Fernando, 27 kilometres (17 mi) from Angeles City, 76 kilometres (47 mi) from Metro Manila, and 1 kilometre (0.62 mi) from Bacolor.

=== Topography ===
The town is mostly flat and is suitable to any kind of development; agricultural, industrial, commercial and others. It is only a meter above sea level.

=== Soil type ===
In general, the soils of Guagua are of recent alluvial origin consisting of fine sand, silt loam and hydrosol. The average chemical analysis of its top soils is : nitrogen, 0.02 to 0.1; phosphorus, 0.06 to 0.28; potassium, 0.46 to 1.74; organic carbon, 0.41 to 3.02; and pH value (acidity and alkalinity), 5.61 to 6.99.

=== Flora and fauna ===
The climate and topographical features of the vast land of Guagua make it ideal for the growing of fruit trees and vegetables. Among the fruit trees most fitting to be planted are mangoes, guavas, santol, star apples, and bananas. For vegetables, sitao, upo, ampalaya, gabi and cucumber are the most commonly produced by farmers and which thrive best in the community.

Being void of forest areas, its fauna are mostly the domesticated ones like, chicken, ducks, cattle, and others.

=== Climate ===
Climate data for Guagua, Pampanga
Month	Jan	Feb	Mar	Apr	May	Jun	Jul	Aug	Sep	Oct	Nov	Dec	Year
Mean daily maximum °C (°F)	30 (86)	31 (88)	33 (91)	34 (93)	33 (91)	31 (88)	29 (84)	29 (84)	29 (84)	30 (86)	31 (88)	30 (86)	31 (87)
Mean daily minimum °C (°F)	19 (66)	20 (68)	21 (70)	23 (73)	25 (77)	25 (77)	25 (77)	25 (77)	24 (75)	23 (73)	22 (72)	20 (68)	23 (73)
Average precipitation mm (inches)	8 (0.3)	9 (0.4)	15 (0.6)	34 (1.3)	138 (5.4)	203 (8.0)	242 (9.5)	233 (9.2)	201 (7.9)	126 (5.0)	50 (2.0)	21 (0.8)	1,280 (50.4)
Average rainy days	3.7	4.1	6.5	11.2	21.2	24.9	27.7	26.5	25.5	21.8	12.6	5.6	191.3
Source: Meteoblue

=== Barangays ===
Guagua is divided into four (4) districts, subdivided into 31 barangays, as shown below. Each barangay consists of puroks and some have sitios.

Poblacion district

- Bancal
- Plaza Burgos
- San Nicolas 1st
- San Pedro
- San Rafael
- San Roque
- Santa Filomena
- Santo Cristo
- Santo Niño

Pangulo district

- San Vicente (Ebus)
- Lambac
- Magsaysay
- Maquiapo
- Natividad
- Pulungmasle
- Rizal
- Ascomo
- Jose Abad Santos (Siran)

Locion district

- San Pablo
- San Juan 1st
- San Jose
- San Matias
- San Isidro
- San Antonio

Betis district

- San Agustin
- San Juan Bautista
- San Juan Nepomuceno
- San Miguel
- San Nicolas 2nd
- Santa Ines
- Santa Ursula

San Rafael was constituted from Dock Island in 1956.

== Demographics ==
Population census of Guagua

Year	Pop.	±% p.a.
1903	15,151	—
1918	15,962	+0.35%
1939	22,331	+1.61%
1948	34,738	+5.03%
1960	40,126	+1.21%
1970	58,270	+3.80%
1975	65,336	+2.32%
1980	72,609	+2.13%

Year	Pop.	±% p.a.
1990	88,290	+1.97%
1995	95,363	+1.45%
2000	96,858	+0.33%
2007	104,601	+1.07%
2010	111,199	+2.25%
2015	117,430	+1.04%
2020	128,893	+1.98%
2024	137,948	+1.64%

Source: Philippine Statistics Authority

In the 2024 census, the population of Guagua was 137,948 people, with a density of 2,800 inhabitants per square kilometre or 7,300 inhabitants per square mile.

=== Religion ===
Roman Catholic 88%, Iglesia ni Cristo 5%, Members Church of God International 3%, Seventh-day Adventists 2%, Others (Including Protestantism, Aglipayan, Buddhism, Islam and Other Religionist) 2%.

== Economy ==
Poverty incidence of Guagua (%)

Source: Philippine Statistics Authority

== Government ==
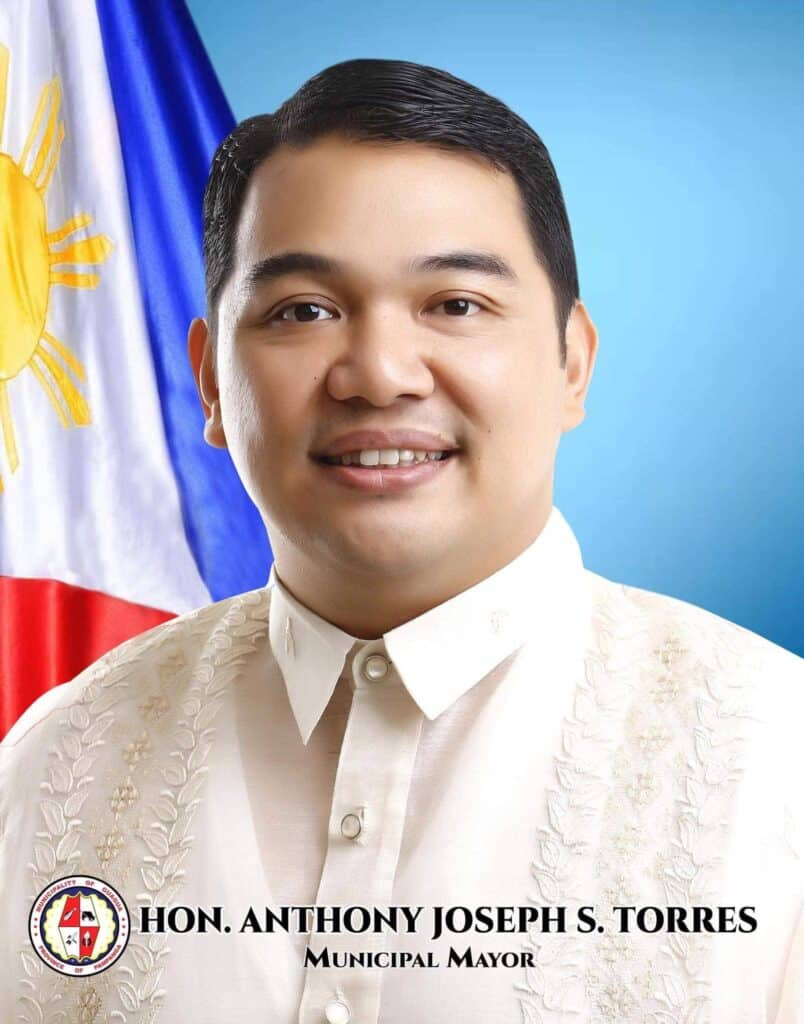
Tonton Torres, Mayor of Guagua since 2022

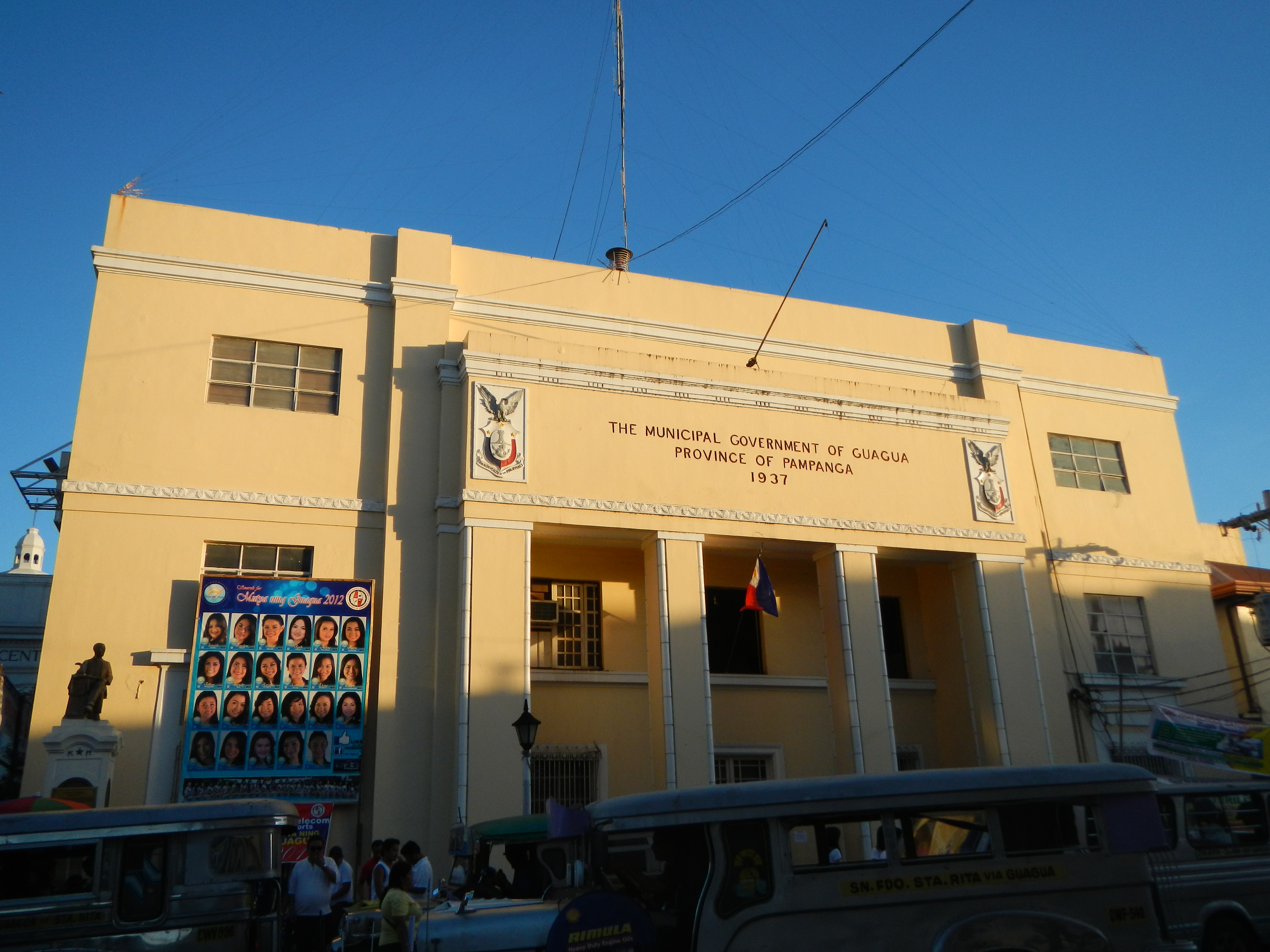
1937 Town hall

Guagua belongs to the Second district of Pampanga, along with the towns in the south-western part of the province. Like other towns in the Philippines, Guagua is governed by a mayor and vice mayor who are elected to three-year terms. The mayor is the executive head and leads the town's departments in executing the ordinances and improving public services. The vice mayor heads a legislative council (Sangguniang Bayan) consisting of councilors.

== Education ==
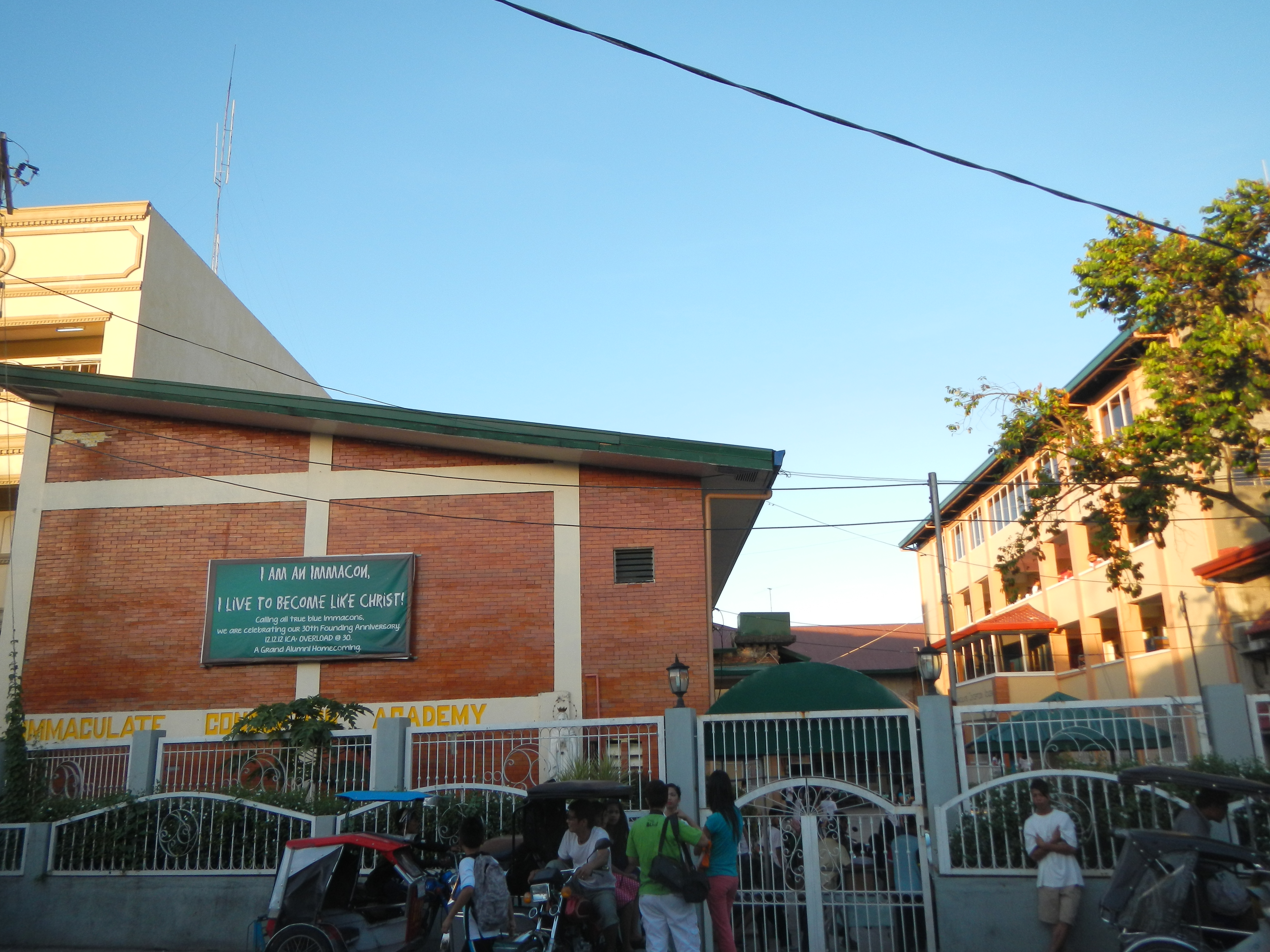
Immaculate Concepcion Academy

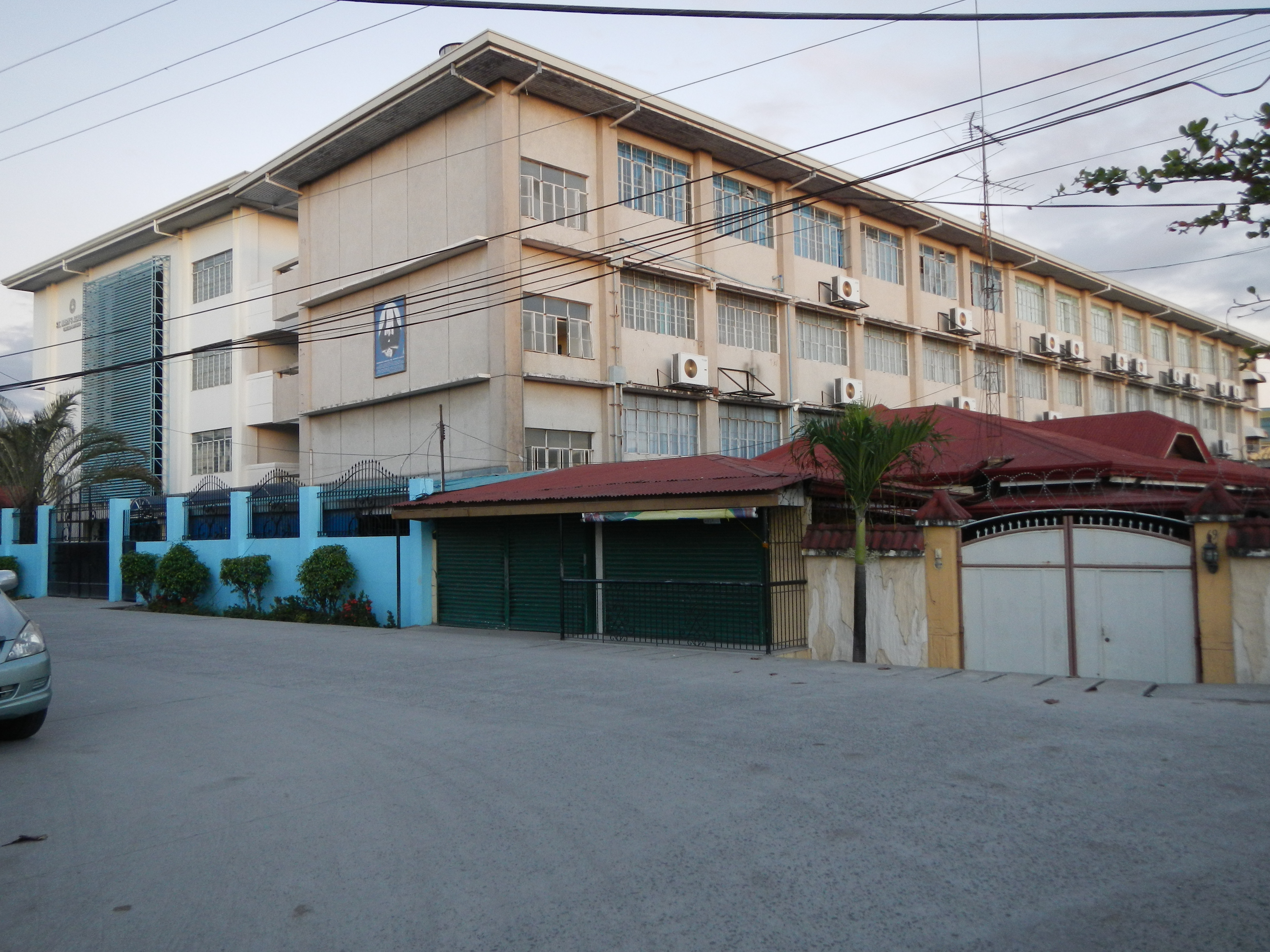
St. Mary's Academy

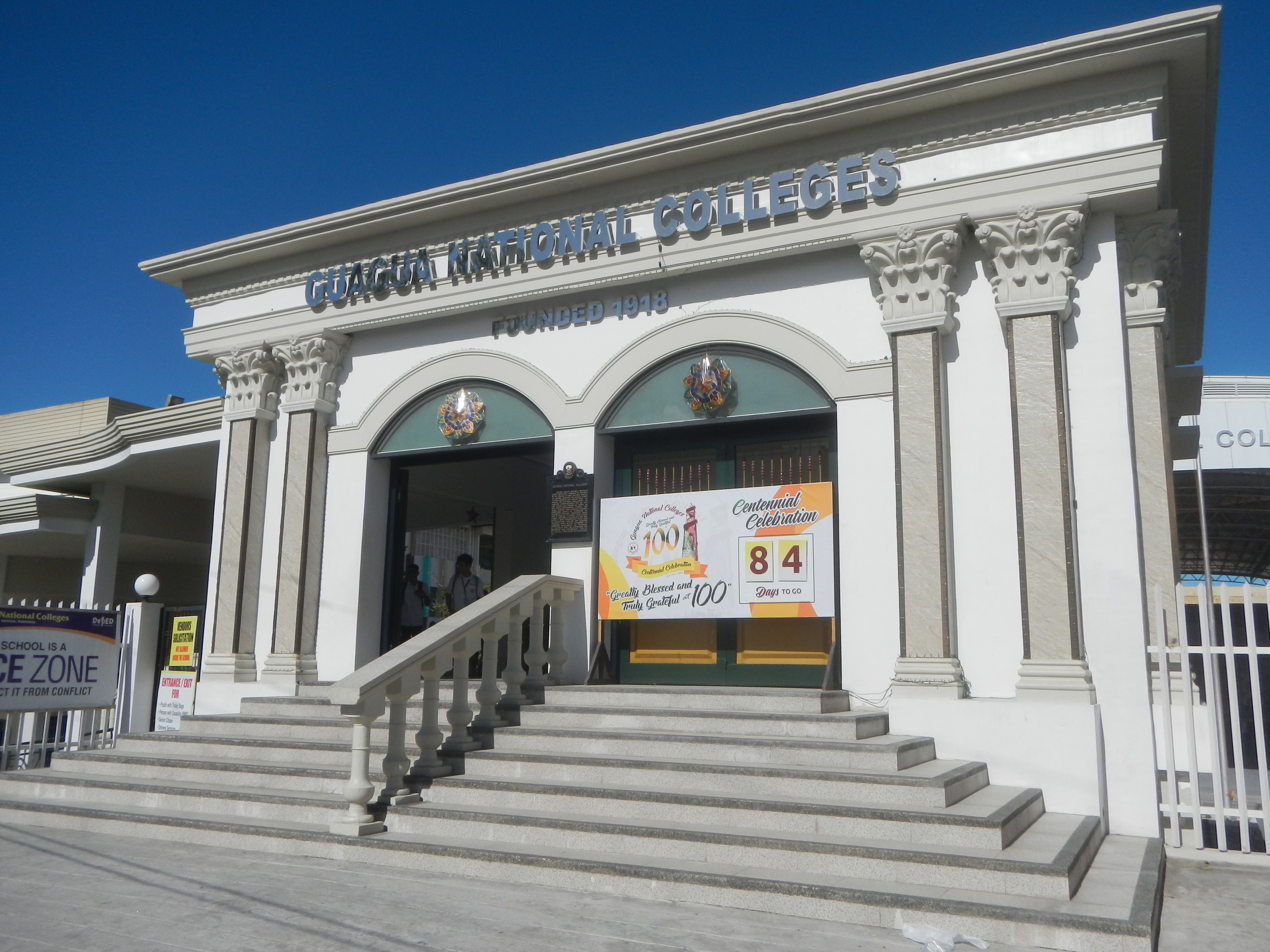
Guagua National Colleges

There are two schools district offices which govern all educational institutions within the municipality. They oversee the management and operations of all private and public, from primary to secondary schools. These are the Guagua East Schools District Office, and Guagua West Schools District Office.

=== Primary and elementary schools ===
- Ascomo Elementary School
- Bancal Elementary School
- Betis Elementary School
- Guagua Elementary School
- Immaculate Conception Academy
- Lambac Elementary School
- Magsaysay Elementary School
- Maquiapo Elementary School
- Maria Montessori School of Guagua
- Mauli Elementary School
- Natividad Adventist Elementary School
- Natividad Elementary School
- Psalms Academy of Pampanga
- Pulungmasle Ecumenical Learning Center
- Pulungmasle Elementary School
- Rizal Elementary School
- San Agustin Elementary School
- San Antonio Elementary School
- San Antonio Elementary School - San Isidro PS (Annex)
- San Juan 1st Elementary School
- San Juan Nepomuceno Elementary School
- San Matias Elementary School
- San Miguel Elementary School
- San Pedro Elementary School
- San Rafael Elementary School
- San Vicente Elementary School
- Santa Ines Elementary School
- Santa Ursula Elementary School
- Siran Elementary School
- St. Angela's Academy
- St. Mary's Academy of Guagua
- Talang Elementary School

=== Secondary schools ===
- Betis National High School
- EZEE Center for the Arts and School
- Guillermo D. Mendoza National High School
- Natividad National High School
- Pulungmasle High School

=== Higher educational institutions ===
- Guagua National Colleges
- Mary the Queen College

== Landmarks and List of Cultural Properties ==
The town has interesting culture and heritage attractions and landmarks, including Rufino Santos Catholic Center, Capt. Ruben P. Sonco Freedom Square, Monument of Aurelio Tolentino (1867-1915). The Guagua National Colleges is also declared as a national historical landmark by the National Historical Commission of the Philippines during the college's 75th Foundation anniversary in 1993.

Cultural Property wmph identifier (Note: wmph is an internal identifier used by Wikimedia Philippines to identify the monument. This is not an official identifier, and only shown temporarily in the templates until the government creates an updated complete list.)	Site name	Description	Province	City or municipality	Address	Coordinates	Image
	Saint James the Apostle Parish Church	declared a National Cultural Treasure by the National Museum of the Philippines	Pampanga	Guagua, Pampanga	Barangay San Nicolas II	14°58′32″N 120°38′35″E	Upload file
	Immaculate Conception Parish Church	18th-century Roman Catholic church, with marker from the National Historical Commission of the Philippines	Pampanga	Guagua, Pampanga	Barangay Plaza Burgos	14°57′53″N 120°38′03″E	Upload file
	The Lopez Mansion (The Guagua Mansion)	Built in 1929 by the sugar magnate, Don Alejandro Lopez (b. May 16, 1883) of Guagua. It was coined as the first all-concrete house in Pampanga and in the 1935 telephone directory the house was named as “The Pride of Guagua Pampanga”. The Lopez Mansion was restored in 2016 to be an events venue and was renamed as The Guagua Mansion.	Pampanga	Guagua, Pampanga	72 San Nicholas 1st Guagua, Pampanga	14°58′07″N 120°38′03″E	Upload file
	Goseco Ancestral House		Pampanga	Guagua, Pampanga	Barangay Plaza Burgos	14°57′52″N 120°38′04″E	Upload file
	Rizal Monument		Pampanga	Guagua, Pampanga	Barangay Plaza Burgos	14°57′57″N 120°37′59″E	Upload file
	Guagua Municipal Hall	Built in 1937	Pampanga	Guagua, Pampanga	Barangay Plaza Burgos	14°57′54″N 120°38′01″E	Upload file

=== Santiago Apostol Parish Church ===
The 1607 Santiago Apostol Parish Church, commonly known as Betis Church is a Baroque (heritage) Church, located in Betis. It is a Spanish-era church declared a National Cultural Treasure by the National Museum of the Philippines and the NCCA (under R.A. 4896 as amended by P.D. 374 and R.A. 8492), on November 5, 2001 (one of only 26 churches in the country bestowed that honor). It is part of the Ecclesiastical Provinces of the Archdiocese of San Fernando. In 2009, the National Museum installed a marker of its 2005 Proclamation.

=== Immaculate Conception Parish Church ===
The first church edifice was constructed in 1587 but was razed by fire. The current Church structure was constructed in 1772 under the administration of the Augustinians. The Church was greatly improved in 1862 until 1870. The interiors are simple and the centerpiece attraction is the main altar, a creation of noted local artist Willy Layug. While still simple, the exteriors on the other hand, are marked by massive strength. The Cathedral-type church is located immediately adjacent to the Guagua Municipal Building and houses the Cardinal Santos Catholic Center and the Immaculate Conception Parochial School.
