= Jose C. Campos =

Philippine Lawyer and Judge

Jose Campos

Associate Justice of the Supreme Court of the Philippines
- In office September 3, 1992 – April 8, 1993
- Preceded by: Edgardo Paras
- Succeeded by: Jose Vitug

Member of the Judicial and Bar Council for retired Supreme Court justices
- In office September 22, 1993 – July 9, 1997
- Appointed by: Fidel V. Ramos
- Preceded by: Lorenzo Relova
- Succeeded by: Regino C. Hermosisima Jr.

Personal details
- Born: April 9, 1923 Dasmariñas, Cavite
- Died: January 4, 2005 (aged 81)
- Relations: Ma. Clara A. Lopez-Campos (spouse)
- Education: University of the Philippines College of Law
- Profession: Lawyer

Jose Campana Campos, Jr. (April 9, 1923 – January 4, 2005) was a Filipino lawyer who served as Associate Justice of the Supreme Court of the Philippines from September 3, 1992, to April 8, 1993. He was appointed by President Corazon Aquino.

== Early life ==
Jose Campos was born in Dasmariñas, Cavite. He received his education from Dasmariñas Elementary School in 1936 as valedictorian, and Cavite High School in 1940 as valedictorian.

He then received his Associate in Arts degree from the University of the Philippines in 1945 with Honors, his Bachelor of Laws from University of the Philippines College of Law in 1949 as cum laude. He passed the Bar Examinations in 1949 with a rating of 93.1% (5th Placer).

He also received his Master of Laws from Yale Law School in 1952 and his postgraduate studies in corporation law and taxation from Yale Law School from 1964 to 1965. He was a Fulbright-Smith Mundt Scholar.

He is a member of Upsilon Sigma Phi. He received a Distinguished Service Award from the fraternity in 1973.

He was married to Ma. Clara A. Lopez-Campos, a noted authority in Corporate and Banking Laws and is a Professor Emerita of the University of the Philippines.

== Professional career ==
He was special assistant, Criminal Investigation Section (ID), Provost Marshal's Office from 1945 to 1947; legal assistant in the Padilla, Carlos and Fernando Law Office, Manila in 1950; member in the law firm of Almeda-Lopez, Gonzales, Campos and Villanueva, Manila from 1953 to 1955; then member in the law firm of Campos, Mendoza and Hernandez, Manila from 1957 to 1961.

He was professor of law in the University of the Philippines from 1950 to 1971; professorial lecturer from 1971 to 1990; university registrar from 1956 to 1958; then budget director and concurrently secretary of the University of the Philippines from 1960 to 1971.

He was presiding judge of the Court of First Instance (CFI) in Pasay City from 1971 to 1983; acting presiding judge of the CFI of Pasay City from 1979 to 1981; executive judge of the CFI of Pasay City from 1978 to 1981. He was on detail as presiding judge in the CFI of Quezon City from 1972 to 1975, and as chairman of the Board of Transportation from 1981 to 1985.

He served as associate justice in the Intermediate Appellate Court from 1983 to 1985; associate justice of the Court of Appeals from 1986 to 1992; then associate justice of the Supreme Court from 1992 to 1993.

He was a member of the Judicial and Bar Council, representing retired justices of the Supreme Court, from September 22, 1993, to July 9, 1997.
