= College of arts and sciences =

Educational institution or a unit within a university

A college of arts and sciences (sometimes called a school of arts and sciences or faculty of arts and sciences) is most commonly an individual institution or academic division within a university that focuses on instruction of the liberal arts and pure sciences, although they frequently include programs and faculty in fine arts, social sciences, and other disciplines such as humanities. They are especially found in North America and the Philippines.

In contrast, an "art school" or "college/school of arts" usually refers to a unit or institution that cultivates visual or performing arts; a "liberal arts college" usually refers to a standalone institution; and a "college/school of (applied) arts and technology" typically refers to places for vocational education.

== University ==
These are "Arts and Sciences" units that are part of a larger post-secondary institution.

Typically, Colleges of (Liberal) Arts and Sciences at a non-specialized university include a rather large number of departments offering a significant number of majors/minors or courses of study. Such departments/majors commonly include mathematics and "pure sciences" such as biology, chemistry, and physics for which B.S. and maybe M.S. degrees are offered, as well as a significant selection of liberal arts. The "liberal arts" may include social sciences such as psychology, sociology, anthropology and other social studies such as history, geography, political science, etc. and language studies including English and other languages, linguistics, writing, literature, and communication arts and a variety of humanities and other fields of study. The sciences may offer B.S. and maybe M.S. degrees, and the other majors may offer B.A. and maybe M.A. degrees. Humanities may include such fields of study as philosophy, classical studies, theology or religious studies, and certain others. Other fields of study may be lumped into a college of (Liberal) Arts and Sciences; however, certain specialized and professional fields are taught in more specialized colleges or schools such as a College of Engineering, College of Business Administration, College of Education, Public policy school, or a College of Fine Arts and certain graduate level schools such as law schools, medical schools, dental schools, etc. The situation may also vary between continents and their various countries.

In many non-specialized universities, the college of (Liberal) Arts and Sciences is one of the largest colleges on the campus, and many students even from other colleges or schools take and are even required to take courses offered by the college of (Liberal) Arts and Sciences, such as mathematics and sometimes certain sciences. A college of (Liberal) Arts and Sciences commonly has a core curriculum which all students in the college must take, regardless of their major in the college. Such a core curriculum may specify that certain courses by their students must be taken, or may require elective courses to be taken within certain areas to provide a well-rounded education for each student. Other colleges or schools within a university could have different core curriculum requirements for their students. For each major and minor field of study, certain minimum courses and usually some electives must be taken within that area for a degree.

=== Australia ===
- Australian National University, College of Arts and Social Sciences
- University of Adelaide, School of Social Sciences
- University of Queensland, School of Social Science
- Western Sydney University, School of Social Sciences

=== Canada ===
- Queen's University Faculty of Arts and Science
- Seneca College School of Arts & Science
- University of Saskatchewan College of Arts & Science
- University of Toronto Faculty of Arts and Science
- University of Toronto Mississauga
- University of Toronto Scarborough

=== Japan ===
- College of Arts and Sciences, University of Tokyo
- Faculty of integrated human studies, Kyoto University
- School of Interdisciplinary Science and Innovation, Kyushu University
- School of Integrated Arts and Sciences, Hiroshima University
- School of Integrated Arts and Sciences, University of Tokushima
- Faculty of Liberal Arts, Saitama University
- Faculty of Liberal Arts, Tsuru University
- International College of Arts and Sciences, Yokohama City University
- College of Liberal Arts, International Christian University
- College of Humanities and Sciences, Nihon University

=== New Zealand ===
- University of Auckland, School of Social Sciences

=== Philippines ===
- Ateneo de Davao University, School of Arts and Sciences
- Ateneo de Manila University, School of Humanities
- Ateneo de Manila University, School of Science and Engineering
- Ateneo de Manila University, School of Social Sciences
- Bicol University, College of Science
- Bicol University, College of Social Sciences and Philosophy
- Bulacan State University, College of Arts and Letters
- Bulacan State University, College of Science
- Bulacan State University, College of Social Sciences and Philosophy
- Cavite State University, College of Arts and Sciences
- Cebu Normal University, College of Arts and Sciences
- Central Luzon State University, College of Arts and Social Sciences
- Central Luzon State University, College of Science
- Central Philippine University College of Arts and Sciences
- De La Salle University College of Liberal Arts
- De La Salle University College of Science
- Don Honorio Ventura State University, College of Arts and Sciences
- Don Honorio Ventura State University, College of Social Sciences and Philosophy
- Far Eastern University – Institute of Arts and Sciences
- Isabela State University, College of Arts and Sciences
- Manila Central University, College of Arts and Sciences
- Manuel S. Enverga University Foundation, College of Arts and Sciences
- Mapua University, School of Social Science and Education
- Mariano Marcos State University, College of Arts and Sciences
- Mater Dei College, College of Arts, Sciences and Technology
- Mindanao State University-General Santos City, College of Social Sciences and Humanities
- Mindanao State University-Iligan Institute of Technology, College of Arts and Social Sciences
- Mindoro State University, College of Arts and Sciences
- Nueva Ecija University of Science and Technology, College of Arts and Sciences
- Pamantasan ng Lungsod ng Maynila, College of Humanities, Arts and Social Sciences
- Pampanga State Agricultural University, College of Arts and Sciences
- Polytechnic University of the Philippines, College of Arts and Letters
- Polytechnic University of the Philippines, College of Science
- Polytechnic University of the Philippines, College of Social Sciences and Development
- Saint Louis University (Philippines), School of Natural Sciences
- Saint Louis University (Philippines), School of Teacher Education and Liberal Arts
- San Beda Manila, College of Arts and Sciences
- Silliman University College of Arts and Sciences
- Tarlac State University, College of Arts and Social Sciences
- Tarlac State University, College of Science
- Technological University of the Philippines, College of Science
- University of Antique, College of Arts and Sciences
- University of Asia and the Pacific, College of Arts and Sciences
- University of Batangas, College of Arts and Sciences
- University of Caloocan City, College of Liberal Arts and Sciences
- University of San Carlos, School of Arts and Sciences
- University of Santo Tomas College of Science
- University of Santo Tomas Faculty of Arts and Letters
- University of Southern Mindanao, College of Arts and Social Sciences
- University of the Cordilleras, College of Arts and Sciences
- University of the Philippines Baguio, College of Social Sciences
- University of the Philippines Cebu, College of Social Sciences
- University of the Philippines Diliman, College of Arts and Letters
- University of the Philippines Diliman, College of Science
- University of the Philippines Diliman, College of Social Sciences and Philosophy
- University of the Philippines Los Baños, College of Arts and Sciences
- University of the Philippines Manila, College of Arts and Sciences
- University of the Philippines Mindanao, College of Humanities and Social Sciences
- Visayas State University, College of Arts and Science
- Wesleyan University Philippines, College of Arts and Sciences
- Western Mindanao State University, College of Social Sciences
- Xavier University – Ateneo de Cagayan, College of Arts and Sciences

=== Russia ===
- Smolny College, Saint Petersburg State University

=== Singapore ===
- National University of Singapore, College of Humanities and Sciences

=== Sweden ===
- Linköping University, Faculty of Arts and Sciences

=== Taiwan ===
- National Dong Hwa University, College of Humanities and Social Sciences

=== United Kingdom ===
- Aston University, School of Social Sciences and Humanities
- Birmingham City University, School of Social Sciences
- Cardiff University, School of Social Sciences
- London Metropolitan University, School of Social Sciences
- Sheffield Hallam University, College of Social Sciences and Arts
- Swansea University, College of Arts and Humanities
- University College London, UCL Arts and Sciences
- University of Aberdeen, School of Social Science
- University of Birmingham, College of Social Sciences
- University of Bradford, School of Social Sciences
- University of Brighton, School of Humanities and Social Sciences
- University of Dundee, School of Social Sciences
- University of Edinburgh, College of Arts, Humanities and Social Sciences
- University of Glasgow, College of Social Sciences
- University of Greenwich, School of Humanities and Social Sciences
- University of Lincoln, College of Social Science
- University of Manchester, School of Social Sciences
- University of the Arts London
- University of Westminster, School of Social Sciences

=== United States ===
| College | Parent institution |
|---|---|
| ASU College of Liberal Arts & Sciences | Arizona State University |
| J. William Fulbright College of Arts and Sciences | University of Arkansas |
| UAB College of Arts and Sciences | University of Alabama at Birmingham |
| American University College of Arts and Sciences | American University |
| Weissman School of Arts and Sciences | Baruch College |
| Morrissey College of Arts & Sciences | Boston College |
| Boston University College of Arts and Sciences | Boston University |
| University at Buffalo College of Arts & Sciences | University at Buffalo |
| UC Berkeley College of Letters and Science | University of California, Berkeley |
| UC Davis College of Letters and Science | University of California, Davis |
| UCLA College of Letters and Science | University of California, Los Angeles |
| UCR College of Humanities, Arts, and Social Sciences | University of California, Riverside |
| UCSB College of Letters and Science | University of California, Santa Barbara |
| Dietrich College of Humanities and Social Sciences | Carnegie Mellon University |
| College of Arts and Sciences | Case Western Reserve University |
| University of Central Florida College of Arts and Humanities | University of Central Florida |
| University of Cincinnati College of Arts and Sciences | University of Cincinnati |
| Columbia Graduate School of Arts and Sciences | Columbia University |
| Cornell University College of Arts and Sciences | Cornell University |
| University of Dayton College of Arts and Sciences | University of Dayton |
| Drexel University College of Arts and Sciences | Drexel University |
| Trinity College of Arts and Sciences | Duke University |
| McAnulty College and Graduate School of Liberal Arts | Duquesne University |
| Thomas Harriot College of Arts and Sciences | East Carolina University |
| Emory College of Arts and Sciences | Emory University |
| Fairfield College of Arts and Sciences | Fairfield University |
| University of Florida College of Liberal Arts and Sciences | University of Florida |
| Dorothy F. Schmidt College of Arts and Letters | Florida Atlantic University |
| Florida International University College of Arts and Sciences | Florida International University |
| Florida State University College of Arts and Sciences | Florida State University |
| Georgetown University College of Arts & Sciences | Georgetown University |
| Georgetown University Graduate School of Arts & Sciences | Georgetown University |
| Franklin College of Arts and Sciences | University of Georgia |
| Ivan Allen College of Liberal Arts | Georgia Tech |
| Harvard Faculty of Arts and Sciences | Harvard University |
| Kenneth C. Griffin Graduate School of Arts and Sciences | Harvard University |
| University of Houston College of Liberal Arts and Social Sciences | University of Houston |
| Howard University College of Arts & Sciences | Howard University |
| University of Illinois College of Liberal Arts and Sciences | University of Illinois Urbana-Champaign |
| Indiana University Bloomington College of Arts and Sciences | Indiana University Bloomington |
| College of Arts & Sciences | Jacksonville University |
| Zanvyl Krieger School of Arts and Sciences | Johns Hopkins University |
| John Hazen White College of Arts & Sciences | Johnson & Wales University |
| College of Liberal Arts & Sciences | University of Kansas |
| Kent State University College of Arts and Sciences | Kent State University |
| University of Kentucky College of Arts and Sciences | University of Kentucky |
| Miami University College of Arts and Science | Miami University |
| University of Michigan College of Literature, Science, and the Arts | University of Michigan |
| University of Minnesota College of Liberal Arts | University of Minnesota |
| UMSL College of Arts and Sciences | University of Missouri–St. Louis |
| College of Letters and Sciences | National University |
| College of Arts and Sciences | University of Nebraska–Lincoln |
| College of Liberal Arts | University of Nevada, Reno |
| NYU College of Arts & Science | New York University |
| NYU Graduate School of Arts and Science | New York University |
| University of North Dakota College of Arts and Sciences | University of North Dakota |
| University of North Texas College of Arts and Sciences | University of North Texas |
| Weinberg College of Arts and Sciences | Northwestern University |
| Notre Dame College of Arts and Letters | University of Notre Dame |
| Farquhar College of Arts and Sciences | Nova Southeastern University |
| Ohio University College of Arts and Sciences | Ohio University |
| Oregon State University College of Liberal Arts | Oregon State University |
| University of Oklahoma College of Arts and Sciences | University of Oklahoma |
| Oklahoma State University College of Arts and Sciences | Oklahoma State University–Stillwater |
| UPenn School of Arts and Sciences | University of Pennsylvania |
| Dietrich School of Arts and Sciences | University of Pittsburgh |
| SUNY College of Arts and Sciences at Potsdam | State University of New York at Potsdam |
| Purdue University College of Liberal Arts | Purdue University |
| University of Richmond School of Arts & Sciences | University of Richmond |
| University of Rochester College of Arts Sciences and Engineering | University of Rochester |
| RIT College of Liberal Arts | Rochester Institute of Technology |
| Rutgers School of Arts and Sciences | Rutgers University |
| Saginaw Valley State University College of Arts and Behavioral Sciences | Saginaw Valley State University |
| Saint Louis University College of Arts and Sciences | Saint Louis University |
| San Diego State University College of Arts & Letters | San Diego State University |
| Savannah State University College of Liberal Arts and Social Sciences | Savannah State University |
| Seattle University College of Arts and Sciences | Seattle University |
| Seton Hall University College of Arts and Sciences | Seton Hall University |
| USC Upstate College of Arts and Sciences | University of South Carolina Upstate |
| Suffolk University College of Arts and Sciences | Suffolk University |
| Syracuse University College of Arts and Sciences | Syracuse University |
| Texas A&M College of Liberal Arts | Texas A&M University |
| Texas Tech University College of Arts & Sciences | Texas Tech University |
| Towson University College of Liberal Arts | Towson University |
| Tufts University School of Arts and Sciences | Tufts University |
| Vanderbilt University College of Arts and Science | Vanderbilt University |
| University of Missouri College of Arts and Science | University of Missouri |
| University of Oregon College of Arts and Sciences | University of Oregon |
| University of Virginia College of Arts and Sciences | University of Virginia |
| Wake Forest University Graduate School of Arts & Sciences | Wake Forest University |
| University of Washington College of Arts and Sciences | University of Washington |
| Arts and Sciences at WashU | Washington University in St. Louis |
| College of Liberal Arts and Sciences | Wayne State University |
| University of West Florida College of Arts and Sciences | University of West Florida |
| UW–Madison College of Letters and Science | University of Wisconsin–Madison |
| UW–Milwaukee College of Letters and Science | University of Wisconsin–Milwaukee |
| Yale Graduate School of Arts and Sciences | Yale University |

== Independent ==
A number of independent institutions, almost entirely postsecondary, also refer to themselves as a college of arts and sciences. These include the following:

=== Canada ===
- Arts and Science Academy of Canada, in Vaughan, Ontario
- Canadian Arts & Sciences Institute, in Vancouver, BC
- La Citadelle International Academy of Arts & Science, in North York, Toronto, Ontario

=== India ===
- Alpha Arts & Science College
- Dr.N.G.P. Arts and Science College, Coimbatore
- Dr. MGR-Janaki College of Arts and Science for Women
- Ideal College of Arts and Sciences
- KG College of Arts and Science
- Kongu Arts and Science College
- Arts and Science College, Honnavar
- AJK College Of Arts and Science, Coimbatore, India
- Mar Gregorios College of Arts and Science, Chennai
- Mary Matha Arts & Science College
- MES's M. M. College of Arts and Science, Sirsi
- MVM Arts and Science College
- PSG College of Arts and Science
- R. Shankar Memorial Arts and Science College
- Rathinam College of Arts and Science
- Shri Nehru Maha Vidyalaya College of Arts & Sciences
- T S Narayanaswami College of Arts and Science
- V.O.C. Arts & Science College
- Aditanar College of Arts & Science
- University Arts and Science College, Warangal

=== Montenegro ===
- Faculty of Liberal Arts and Sciences, Budva

=== Nigeria ===
- Rivers State College of Arts and Science in Port Harcourt
- Akwa Ibom State College of Art and Science in Ikono

=== United States ===
- Massachusetts College of Liberal Arts
- North Springs Charter School of Arts and Sciences
- Thomas More College of Liberal Arts
