= List of educational institutions in Kakinada =

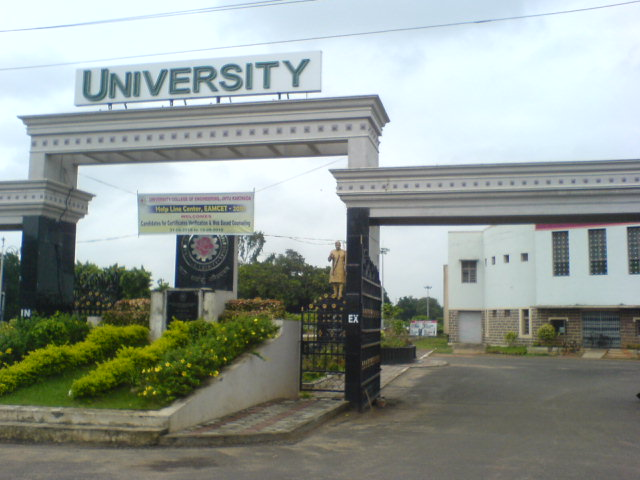
JNTU University entrance

Kakinada, the headquarters of Kakinada district in Andhra Pradesh, is a major educational hub, catering to the growing educational needs of the state. Over the past three decades, the city has seen significant growth in the number of residential colleges offering quality secondary education. Kakinada is home to several professional institutions, providing courses in engineering, medicine, information technology, law, and management at both graduate and postgraduate levels.

Jawaharlal Nehru Technological University (JNTU), Kakinada, offers engineering and business programs, while Rangaraya Medical College is regarded as one of the top medical institutions in the state. Additionally, the Andhra University Postgraduate Centre, established in 1977, provides higher education and is situated on a 50.93-acre (206,100 m^{2}) campus in Thimmapuram, near Kakinada.

== Medical College ==
- Rangaraya Medical College

== Engineering Colleges ==
- Aditya Engineering College
- Kakinada Institute of Engineering and Technology

== General Colleges ==
- P. R. Government College
- Aditya Degree College

== Private Unaided Co-Education Colleges ==
- Ideal College of Arts and Sciences

== University ==
- Jawaharlal Nehru Technological University

== Schools ==
There are more than 600 schools in Kakinada. Some of the important schools are:

- Ashram Public School
- Akshara School
