= Viola Fletcher =

American survivor of the Tulsa race massacre (1914–2025)

- Born: Viola Ford; May 10, 1914; Comanche, Oklahoma, U.S.
- Died: November 24, 2025 (aged 111); Comanche, Oklahoma, U.S.
- Known for: Oldest known living survivor of the Tulsa race massacre
- Spouse: Robert Fletcher (m. 1932; died 1941)
- Children: 3

Viola Fletcher (née Ford; May 10, 1914 – November 24, 2025), also known as Mother Fletcher, was an American woman who, at the time of her death, was the oldest known living survivor of the Tulsa race massacre and a supercentenarian. One hundred years after the massacre, in May of 2021, she testified before Congress about the need for reparations.

== Early life ==
Fletcher was born May 10, 1914, in Comanche, Oklahoma, to Lucinda Ellis and John Wesley Ford. (Note: While The Washington Post reported Fletcher's birthday as May 5, 1914, in 2021, local media in Tulsa report her 110th birthday as May 10, 2024, in 2024.) She was the second oldest of eight children. Her childhood home had no electricity. Before moving to Tulsa the family had been sharecroppers. In Tulsa, the family attended St. Andrew, a Black Baptist church. One younger brother, Hughes Van Ellis, was a newborn at the time of the massacre; Her brother, Hughes, died on October 9, 2023, at the age of 102.

Fletcher told Congress that due to family circumstances after the massacre, she left school after the 4th grade. She returned to Tulsa at the age of 16 and got a job cleaning and creating window displays in a department store. Fletcher was a teacher at Thomas Edison Preparatory in Tulsa. Fletcher died on November 24, 2025 at 111 years old.

== Life ==
=== Experiences during the massacre ===
Her family, including four of her siblings, was living in Greenwood, a wealthy Black neighborhood of Tulsa known as the "Black Wall Street", at the time of the massacre.

Fletcher was seven years old at the time of the massacre. She was in bed, asleep, on May 31, 1921, when the massacre began; her mother woke the family and they fled. The family lost everything but the clothes they were wearing. The oldest known living survivor of the massacre (several months older than Lessie Benningfield Randle, who was born later the same year, 1914), Fletcher reportedly still slept sitting up on her couch with the lights on.

=== Pursuit of reparations ===
In 2020, Fletcher and the other survivors filed suit against the city of Tulsa, the Tulsa Board of Commissioners and the Oklahoma Military Department, seeking reparations. The suit was dismissed by Tulsa County District Judge Caroline Wall in July 2023. Fletcher testified about reparations before the U.S. Congress on May 19, 2021, along with her 100-year-old brother Hughes and Lessie Benningfield Randle, who was 106. Fletcher told Congress:

"I will never forget the violence of the white mob when we left our home. I still see Black men being shot, Black bodies lying in the street. I still smell smoke and see fire. I still see Black businesses being burned. I still hear airplanes flying overhead. I hear the screams"

She testified that the city of Tulsa had used the names of victims and images of the massacre to generate money for the city. In 2022, Fletcher, her brother, and Randle received $1 million from New York philanthropist Ed Mitzen.

A Justice Department review in 2024 found that federal prosecution may have been possible a century ago, but there was no longer an avenue to bring a criminal case launched under the Emmett Till Unsolved Civil Rights Crime Act.

=== Visit to Ghana ===
In August 2021, Fletcher and her brother Hughes visited Ghana. They met with Ghanaian president Nana Akufo-Addo. She was crowned a queen mother and given several Ghanaian names, including Naa Lamiley, which means, "Somebody who is strong. Somebody who stands the test of time", Naa Yaoteley, which means "the first female child in a family or bloodline", and Ebube Ndi Igbo.

=== Oral history project ===
Fletcher was interviewed in 2014 for an oral history project conducted by the Oklahoma Oral History Research program and the Oklahoma State University College of Human Sciences.

In 2021, on the occasion of the centennial of the massacre, an AI-powered conversational video project using StoryFile technology debuted at the Gilcrease Museum and was made accessible to the public online, so people could ask her questions about her experiences.

== Personal life and death ==
In 1932, at the age of 18, she married Robert Fletcher (d. 1941) and moved with him to California, where they both worked in shipyards, Viola as an assistant welder. She left her husband, who had been physically abusive, just before her son, Robert Ford Fletcher, was born and went to live in Bartlesville, Oklahoma.

She had another son, James Edward Ford, and a daughter, Debra Stein Ford, from other relationships. She returned to Oklahoma after World War II and raised three children by herself, while she worked cleaning houses. She worked until she was 85.

Fletcher was also known as Mother Fletcher or Mother Viola Fletcher. In 2023, she wrote a memoir, Don't Let Them Bury My Story, with her grandson.

On May 10, 2024, Fletcher turned 110, and became a supercentenarian.

Fletcher died on November 24, 2025, at the age of 111.

== Bibliography ==
- Howard, Ike; Ford Fletcher, Viola (2023). Don't Let Them Bury My Story: The Oldest Living Survivor of the Tulsa Race Massacre in Her Own Words (Hardcover). Los Angeles: Mocha Media, Inc. ISBN 978-1737168409.
