= Vincent J. Cristofalo =

American cell biologist

Vincent Joseph Cristofalo (1933—2006) was an American cell biologist.

== Biography ==
Born in Philadelphia, Cristofalo received his undergraduate degree from St. Joseph's College and a master's degree from Temple University, followed by a PhD in physiology and biochemistry from the University of Delaware in 1962.

In 1967, Cristofalo joined the University of Pennsylvania as an assistant professor of animal biology and contributed to the establishment of the Institute on Aging. His academic tenure included appointments in physiology and social work. Additionally, he held positions at various institutions, including the Lankenau Institute for Medical Research, where he served as president, and faculties at Temple University, the Wistar Institute, the Medical College of Pennsylvania, Allegheny University of the Health Sciences, and Thomas Jefferson University.

In his administrative roles, Cristofalo was president of the Gerontological Society of America in 1990 and the American Federation for Aging Research from 1996 to 1998. He also served as an editor for the Journal of Gerontology: Biological Sciences.

== Research ==
Cristofalo's early research focused on cancer cell metabolism before shifting to the study of the lifespan of healthy cells and cell senescence. His research explored the effects of factors such as oxygen, vitamin E, and hydrocortisone on cell replication, and he investigated aging and cellular degeneration from a genetic and evolutionary perspective.

Cristofalo co-authored a paper in 1998, titled "Relationship Between Donor Age and the Replicative Life Span of Human Cells in Culture," published in The Proceedings of the National Academy of Sciences. The study presented data challenging the then-prevailing belief about the reduced replicative capacity of cells from older individuals.
