= Music of Fantasia (1940 film) =

Soundtracks to the 1940 film Fantasia

The music for the 1940 animated musical anthology film Fantasia consisted of eight orchestral suites from Johann Sebastian Bach, Pyotr Ilyich Tchaikovsky, Igor Stravinsky, Ludwig van Beethoven, Franz Schubert, named as different segments in the film. The orchestral portions were conducted by Leopold Stokowski and performed by the Philadelphia Orchestra.

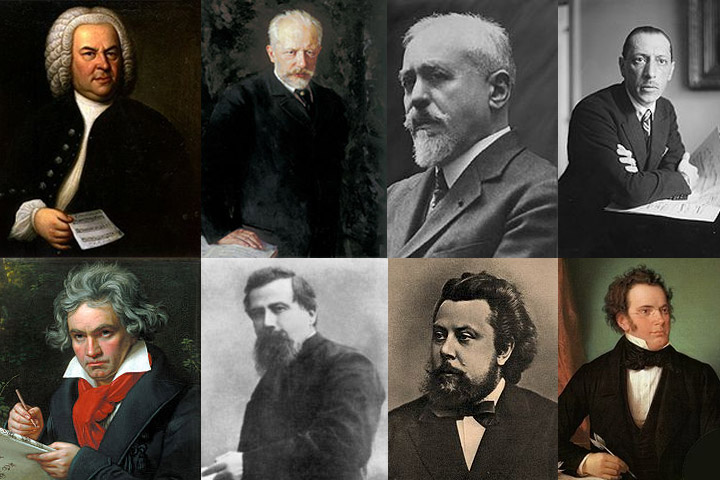
Composers featured in Fantasia (left to right): [top] Johann Sebastian Bach, Pyotr Ilyich Tchaikovsky, Paul Dukas, Igor Stravinsky; [bottom] Ludwig van Beethoven, Amilcare Ponchielli, Modest Mussorgsky, Franz Schubert

Recording of Fantasia was held in January 1938 with the segment The Sorcerer's Apprentice being first to be recorded at the Culver Studios in California. The other segments were recorded during April 1939 at the Academy of Music, with the 90-member crew from the Philadelphia Orchestra. The recording, editing and final mix of the film took place for 42 days, which was completed by July 1939, although minor re-recordings were held afterwards prior to the 1940 release. A mono soundtrack was first released by Disneyland and Buena Vista Records in 1957, followed by a stereo release in 1961.

Disney executives replaced the degrading soundtrack with a new Dolby Stereo recording of Irwin Kostal conducting a 121-piece orchestra and 50-member choir. Kostal's recording was issued by Buena Vista in 1982. A new remastered edition of Stokowski's soundtrack was issued in 1990, certified platinum by the Recording Industry Association of America (RIAA) in 1993 for one million copies sold.

== Production ==
=== Stokowski's original recording ===
Walt Disney wanted to experiment in more sophisticated sound recording and reproduction techniques for Fantasia employing monaural sound so that the audience would feel like they were standing at the podium with Stokowski. Recording for The Sorcerer's Apprentice by Paul Dukas was held at the Culver Studios in California on January 9, 1938. The session held for three hours and involved a single rehearsal; Stokowski picked the 85 musicians himself accustoming to the late-hour recording sessions and acoustically altered with double plywood semi-circular partitions separating the orchestra into five sections as well as acting as a baffle wall to increase reverberation.

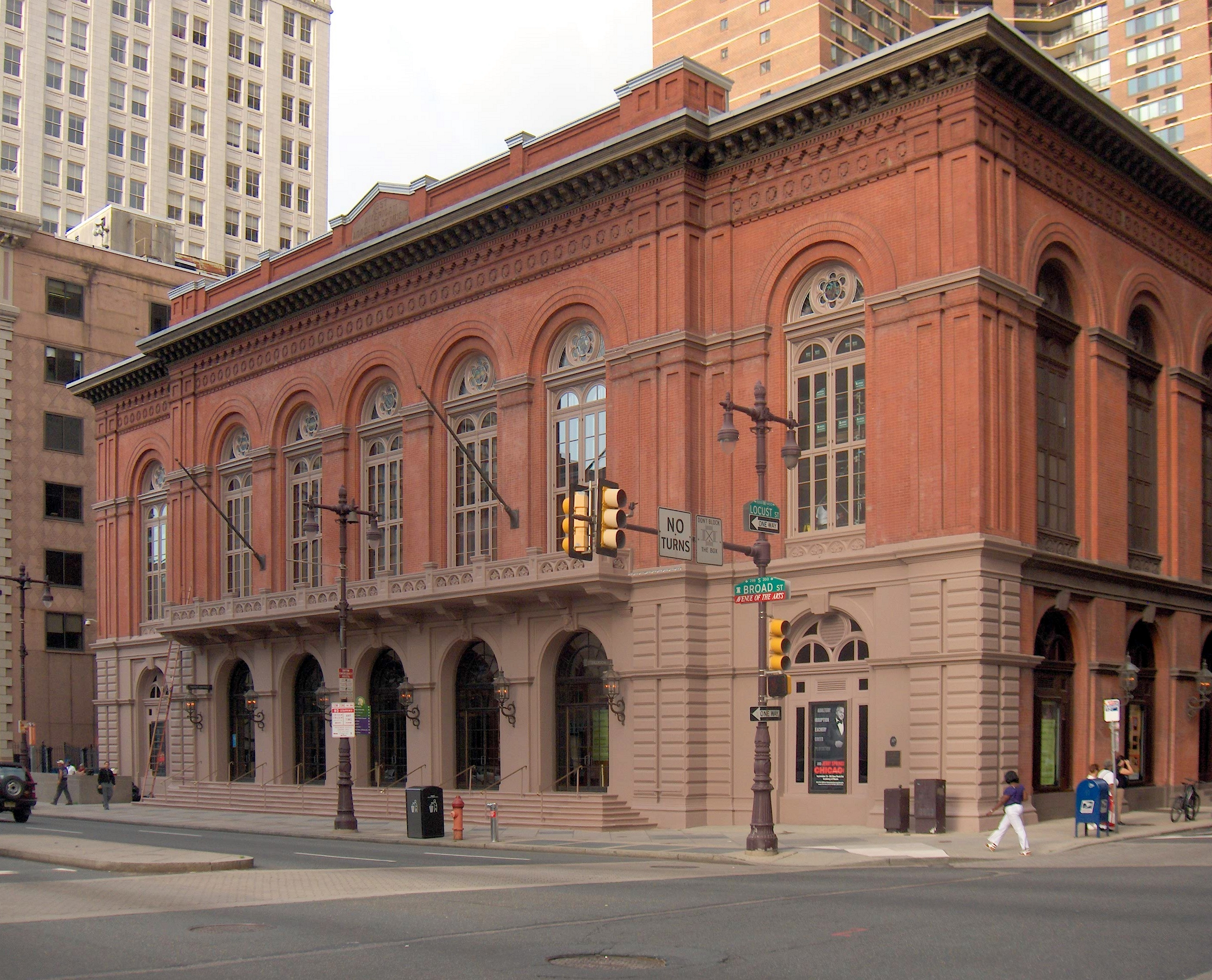
With execption to The Sorcerer's Apprentice, the film's score was recorded at the Philadelphia Academy of Music.

Nearly a year later, Stokowski signed an eighteen-month contract with Disney to conduct the remaining orchestral pieces with the Philadelphia Orchestra. The main recording sessions took place on April 6, 8, and 12, each three hours in length at the Academy of Music, which was chosen for its favourable acoustics. The orchestra involved 90 members, including some students at the Curtis Institute of Music; each player were paid $10 per hour, with the principal players receiving a fee of $400. Ave Maria features the Westminster Choir College under the supervision of Charles E. Henderson, and college affiliate Julietta Novis as the soprano solo. American author Rachel Field was chosen to write original lyrics for one of the wages. Disney paid almost $18,000 as fees for the musicians, technicians and stage personnel.

Although Disney collaborated with engineers for the RCA Corporation to elaborate on a multi-channel audio setup at The Sorcerer's Apprentice, the plan was later abandoned due to budget constraints. Multiple ideas and tests resulted in the development of Fantasound, a then-pioneering pioneering stereophonic surround sound system which innovated some processes widely used today, including simultaneous multitrack recording, overdubbing, and noise reduction. By July 1939, the finished recordings arrived at the studio; a meeting was held on the 14th of that month, that allowed the artists working on each segment to listen to Stokowski's arrangements and suggest alterations in the sound design. Afterwards, some solo parts were subsequently re-recorded in California under Stokowski's direction. The recording, editing and final mix of the sound held for 42 days and a fifth of the film's budget was spent on the Fantasound recording techniques.

=== Irwin Kostal's re-recording ===
In 1981, Disney executives decided to replace the Stokowski's soundtrack with the new, digital recording in Dolby Stereo with conductor Irwin Kostal; the decision taken by president and CEO Ron W. Miller, was mostly due to the original version's music being degraded in quality. Kostal directed a 121-piece orchestra and 50-member choir for the recording that took place across 18, three-hour sessions in January 1982 at the CBS Studio Center in Los Angeles, which costed almost $1.4 million. The sessions further involved members who participated in Stokowski's recording. Kostal found it difficult to pace with Stokowski's direction, but chose Mussorgsky's orchestration of Night on Bald Mountain instead of Stokowski's arrangement, based on Nikolay Rimsky-Korsakov's version. The new recording also corrected a two-frame lag in projection caused by the recording techniques used at the time the film was made. It was further prepared for the film's reissue from April 2, 1982, which had Taylor's scenes replaced with briefer voiceover narration from Hugh Douglas as the studio felt audiences by now had become "more sophisticated and knowledgeable about music."

== Release history ==
The soundtrack was first released as a mono three LP set in sixteen countries by Disneyland and Buena Vista Records in 1957; the recording consisted the musical pieces without the opening narration. A stereo edition LP was issued by Buena Vista Records in 1961. Disney was required to obtain permission from Stokowski, who initially rejected its sale unless the Philadelphia Orchestra Association received a share of the royalties. Kostal's recording was issued on two CDs, two LPs and two audio cassettes by Buena Vista Records in 1982. The remastered Stokowski soundtrack was reissued through CDs and audio cassettes by Buena Vista Records in September 1990, and a later re-issue followed on 2006.

For the film's 75th anniversary in 2015, the Stokowski and Kostal recordings were released by Walt Disney Records on a four-disc album as the fifth volume of The Legacy Collection. The set includes Stokowski's recording of the deleted Clair de Lune segment, and a recording of The Sorcerer's Apprentice and Peter and the Wolf (from Make Mine Music) with added narration by Sterling Holloway; he himself narrated the latter originally.

== Track listing ==
Disc 1
No.	Title	Composer(s)	Length
1.	"Toccata and Fugue in D minor, BWV 565"	Johann Sebastian Bach	9:22
2.	"The Nutcracker Suite – "Dance of the Sugar Plum Fairy""	Pyotr Ilyich Tchaikovsky	2:41
3.	"The Nutcracker Suite – "Chinese Dance""	Pyotr Ilyich Tchaikovsky	1:02
4.	"The Nutcracker Suite – "Dance of the Reed Flutes""	Pyotr Ilyich Tchaikovsky	1:48
5.	"The Nutcracker Suite – "Arabian Dance""	Pyotr Ilyich Tchaikovsky	3:18
6.	"The Nutcracker Suite – "Russian Dance""	Pyotr Ilyich Tchaikovsky	1:04
7.	"The Nutcracker Suite – "Waltz of the Flowers""	Pyotr Ilyich Tchaikovsky	4:25
8.	"The Sorcerer's Apprentice"	Paul Dukas	9:17
9.	"The Rite of Spring"	Igor Stravinsky	22:28
Total length:			55:25

Disc 2
No.	Title	Composer(s)	Length
1.	"Symphony No. 6, Op. 68 – "I. Allegro ma non troppo""	Ludwig Van Beethoven	4:40
2.	"Symphony No. 6, Op. 68 – "II. Andante molto mosso""	Ludwig Van Beethoven	6:23
3.	"Symphony No. 6, Op. 68 – "III. Allegro / IV. Allegro / V. Allegretto""	Ludwig Van Beethoven	10:57
4.	"Dance of the Hours from the opera La Gioconda"	Amilcare Ponchielli	12:13
5.	"Night on Bald Mountain"	Modest Mussorgsky	7:25
6.	"Ave Maria, Op. 52 No. 6"	Franz Schubert	6:27
Total length:			48:05

== Charts ==
Chart (1990)	Peak position
US Billboard 200	190

== Certifications ==
Region	Certification	Certified units/sales
United States (RIAA)	Platinum	1,000,000^{^}
^{^} Shipments figures based on certification alone.

== Bibliography ==
Books

- Barrier, Michael (2008). The Animated Man: A Life of Walt Disney. University of California Press. ISBN 978-0-520-25619-4.
- Culhane, John (1983). Walt Disney's Fantasia. Harry N. Abrams Inc. ISBN 978-3-8228-0393-6.
- Ehrbar, Greg; Hollis, Tim (2006). Mouse Tracks: The Story of Walt Disney Records. University Press of Mississippi. ISBN 978-1-57806-849-4.
- Gabler, Neal (2006). Walt Disney: The Triumph of the American Imagination. New York: Vintage Books. ISBN 978-0-6797-5747-4.
- Gelder, Peter Van (1990). That's Hollywood: A Behind-the-Scenes Look at 60 of the Greatest Films of All Time. Harper Collins. ISBN 978-0-06-096512-9.
- Shepherd, Ashley (2003). Pro Tools for Video, Film and Multimedia. Cengage Learning. ISBN 978-1-59200-069-2.
- Telotte, Jean-Pierre (2008). The Mouse Machine: Disney and Technology. University of Illinois Press. ISBN 978-0-252-07540-7.

Academic papers

- Fernandez, Daniel (May 2017). The Sorcerer's Apprentices: Authorship and Sound Aesthetics in Walt Disney's Fantasia (Master of Arts thesis). Dorothy F. Schmidt College of Arts and Letters, Florida Atlantic University.
