= Padre Faura Street =

Street in Manila, Philippines

Coordinates: 14°34′43″N 120°59′1″E

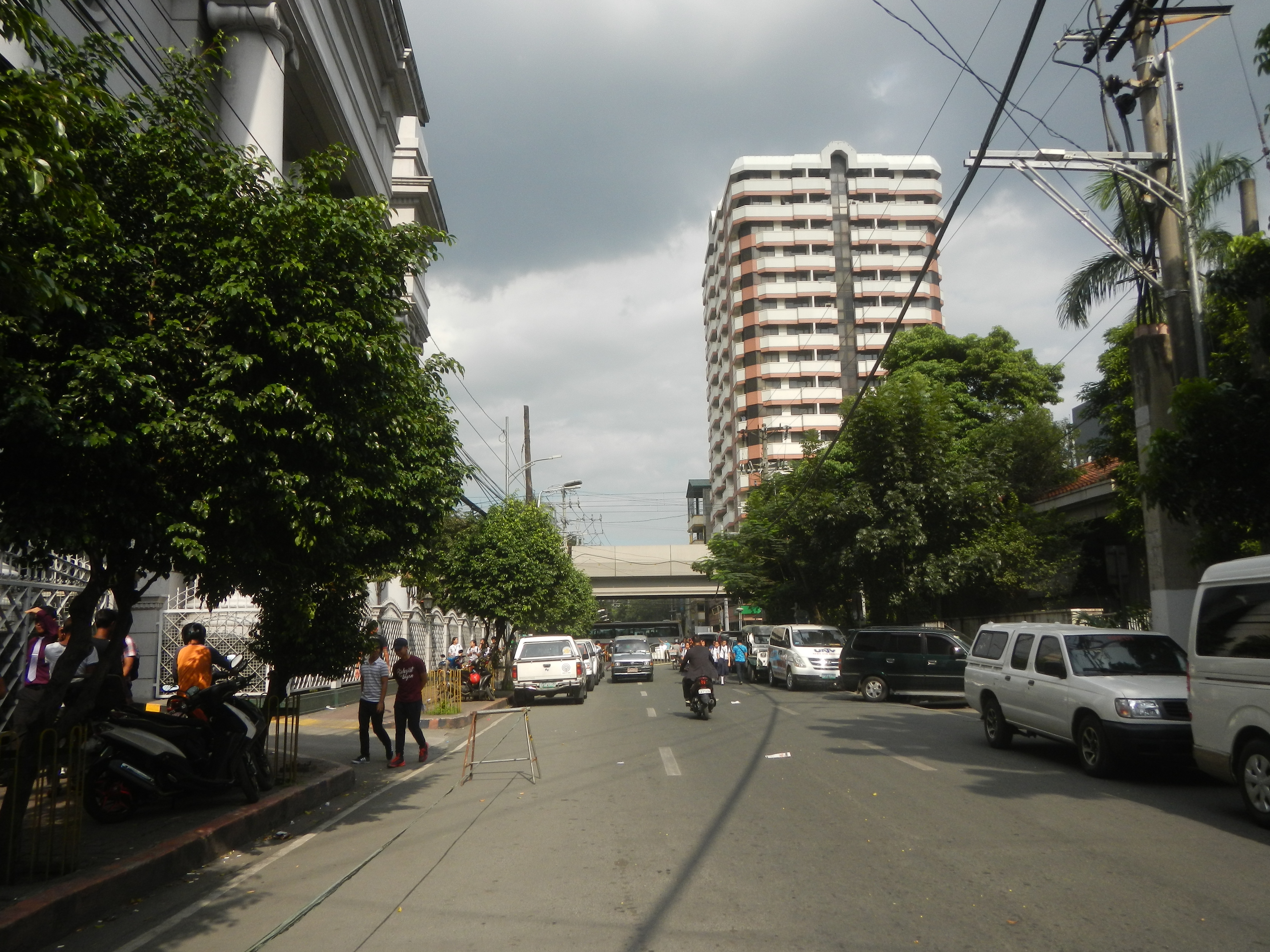
- Padre Faura Street looking east towards Taft Avenue
- Interactive map of Padre Faura Street
- Former name: Observatorio Street
- Namesake: P. Federico Faura
- Length: 1 km (0.62 mi)
- Location: Manila
- East end: Romualdez Street in Paco
- Major junctions: N181 (San Marcelino Street); N170 (Taft Avenue); Maria Orosa Street; Bocobo Street; Mabini Street; Del Pilar Street
- West end: AH 26 (N120) (Roxas Boulevard) in Ermita

Padre Faura Street is an east-west street in downtown Manila, Philippines. It carries traffic one-way westbound from Romualdez Street to Roxas Boulevard. Starting at its eastern terminus at Paco Park in Paco district, the street heads west for a short stretch towards the intersection with Taft Avenue, where the Manila Science High School is located. Past the intersection, the street traverses the district of Ermita, where several important government institutions, such as the Supreme Court, the Department of Justice, and the Philippine General Hospital, are located. Also located along this stretch of Padre Faura are the UP Manila College of Arts and Sciences, Robinsons Place Manila, and some hotels and condominiums. The street ends at the intersection with Roxas Boulevard, just across from the United States Embassy.

The street was named after the Jesuit priest Federico Faura, a Spanish director of the Manila Observatory (Observatorio Meteorológico de Manila), which was located along it. It was formerly called Observatorio Street. The Manila Observatory was located at the former Ateneo Municipal campus along Padre Faura, now replaced by Robinsons Place Manila.

== Points of interest ==
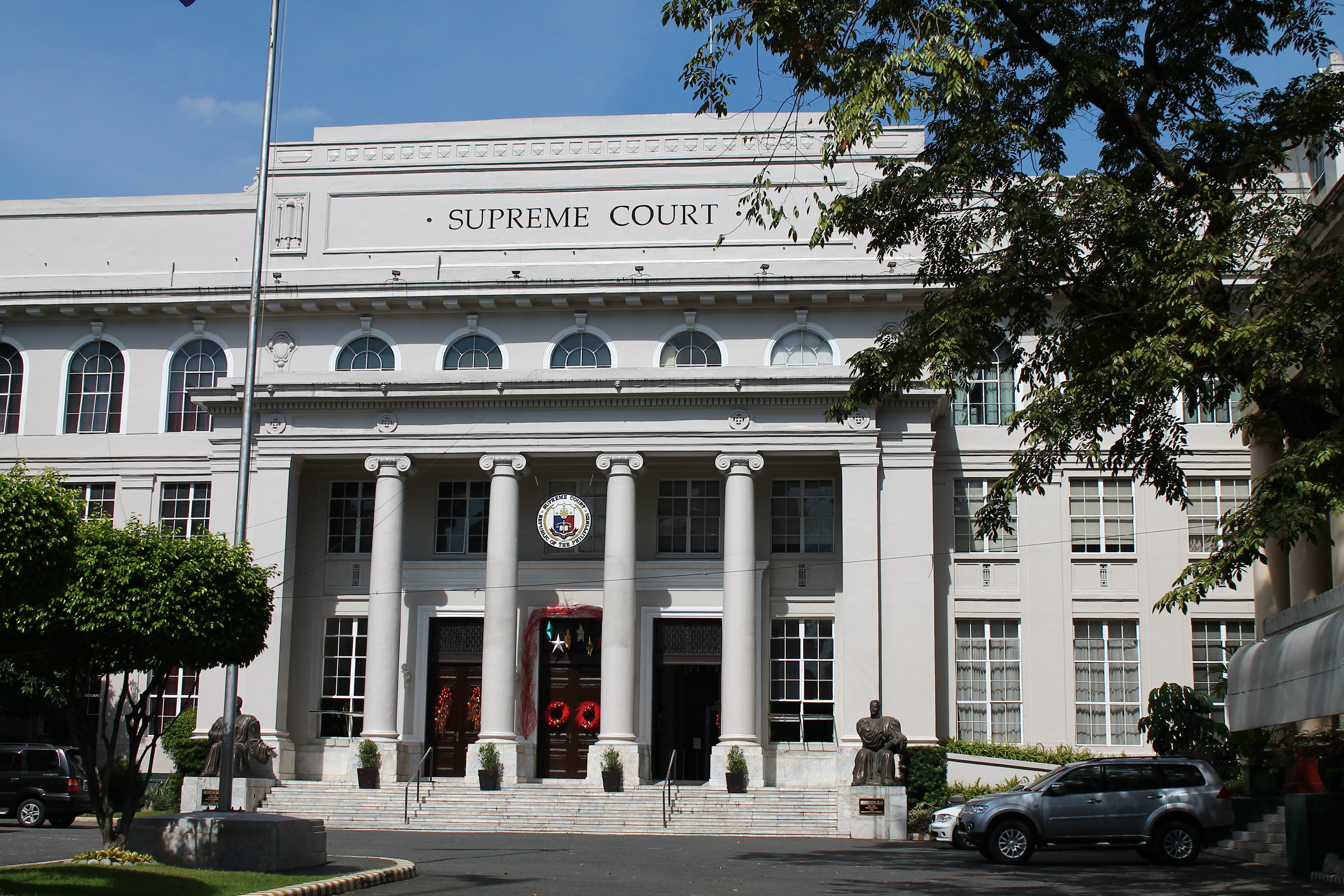
Supreme Court of the Philippines

The street is the location of the Supreme Court of the Philippines Building, the Department of Justice Building and the Philippine General Hospital. Near the intersection with Roxas Boulevard are several hotels and residential towers, such as the 1322 Golden Empire Tower, Citystate Tower Hotel, Grand Riviera Suites, Lotus Garden Hotel Manila, Manila Astral Tower, and Robinsons Adriatico Residences. Paco Park is located on the street's eastern terminus. The Manila Science High School, Ibarra's Garden restaurant, Philippine Airlines Learning Center, and some of the buildings of the University of the Philippines Manila are also located on Padre Faura Street, such as the UP Manila College of Arts and Sciences, UP Manila Learning Resource Center and the UP Manila Oblation Statue.

Landmarks, from east to west:

- Paco Park
- Girl Scouts of the Philippines
- Manila Science High School
- Supreme Court
- University of the Philippines Manila
- Robinsons Manila
- Philippine Airlines Training Center
- 1332 Golden Empire Tower
- United States Embassy

== Intersections ==
The entire route is located in Manila.

km	mi	Destinations	Notes
		Romualdez Street	Eastern terminus.
		San Marcelino Street	
		Agoncillo Street	
		Leon Guinto Street	
		R-2 N170 (Taft Avenue)	Traffic light intersection.
		Maria Orosa Avenue	
		Santa Monica Street	
		Bocobo Street	
		Adriatico Street	
		Mabini Street	Traffic light intersection.
		Del Pilar Street	Traffic light intersection.
		Guerrero Street	
		AH 26 (N120) (Roxas Boulevard) R-1	Western terminus. Entrance to northbound only.
1.000 mi = 1.609 km; 1.000 km = 0.621 mi: Incomplete access
