= Allegheny University =

Allegheny University may refer to:

- Allegheny College
- Allegheny University of the Health Sciences
