= Drexel University College of Arts and Sciences =

Unit of Drexel University in Philadelphia, Pennsylvania

Coordinates: 39.9536°N 75.1894°W

- Established: July 1, 1990
- Affiliations: Drexel University
- Dean: Norma Bouchard
- Location: Philadelphia, Pennsylvania, USA
- Campus: University City Campus
- Website: drexel.edu/coas/

The College of Arts and Sciences (CoAS) is one of the many colleges at Drexel University. It was formed in 1990 when Drexel merged the two existing College of Sciences and College of Humanities together.

== History ==
The College of Arts and Sciences traces its orings back to Drexel Institute of Art, Science and Industry, founded in 1891. As its curriculum broadened, the School of Engineering employed full professors for English, mathematics, and chemistry in 1914. The College of Science was created in 1968, and the College of Humanities and Social Sciences in 1970.

In 1990, the present-day College of Arts and Science was created from a combination of the College of Science and the College of Humanities and Social Sciences. This consolidation was mainly the result of a downturn in enrollments and fiscal shortfalls at the time. After the merger with MCP/Hahnemann in 2002, several departments within the College were reorganized, which resulted in the creation of the Department of Psychology, the Department of Culture and Communication, and the Department of English and Philosophy. In addition, Computer Science was separated from the Department of Mathematics and Computer Science and moved to the College of Engineering; the School of Education was separated from the College of Arts and Sciences.

== Present ==
The current structure of the college is made up of fourteen departments and one interdisciplinary major program that interact with each other, as well as with a broad array of units throughout the university. The College's level of involvement in teaching across the university is exhibited by the fact that it teaches approximately 35% of the total student credit hours of the university each year. The College employs over 300 faculty with research expenditures exceeding $4.6 million. At the undergraduate level, it has nineteen majors (BS, BA), as well as several minor and dual-degree programs. At the graduate level, the CoAs has nine PhD. programs and twelve MS programs.

The CoAS offers majors and minors in 26 different areas of study and is the home of MAYA, Drexel's literary magazine. Students also have the opportunity for taking up an internet-based learning opportunity involving different mediums, such as online discussions, WebCT, and PowerPoint presentations.

== Degrees Offered ==
The College of Arts and Sciences offers twenty majors, eight accelerated degrees, six certificates, nine intermediate proficiency certificates, and 38 minors:

- Majors
  - Anthropology (BA)
  - Biological Sciences (BS)
  - Chemistry (BA, BS)
  - Chemistry-Biochemistry Concentration (BS)
  - Communication (BA, BS)
  - Criminology and Justice Studies (BS)
  - English (BA)
  - Environmental Sciences (BS)
  - Environmental Studies (BS)
  - Environmental Studies and Sustainability (BA)
  - Geoscience (BS)
  - Global Studies (BA)
  - History (BA)
  - Mathematics (BA, BS)
  - Philosophy (BA)
  - Physics (BS)
  - Political Science (BA)
  - Psychology (BS)
  - Sociology (BA)
- Accelerated Degrees
  - Anthropology (BA) / Science, Technology & Society (MS)
  - Anthropology (BA/BS) / Law (JD)
  - Biological Scienced (BS) / Biology (MS)
  - Biological Sciences (BA/BS) / Medicine (MD)
  - Chemistry (BS) / Chemistry (MS)
  - Chemistry (BA/BS) / Medicine (MD)
  - Chemistry (BA/BS) / Law (JD)
  - English (BA) / Publishing (MA)
  - History (BA) / Library and Information Science (MSLIS)
  - History (BA) / Science, Technology & Society (MS)
  - Philosophy (BA) / Public Policy (MS)
  - Philosophy (BA) / Science, Technology & Society (MS)
  - Political Science (BA) / Science, Technology & Society (MS)
  - Sociology (BA) / Science, Technology & Society (MS)
- Certificates
  - Ethical Theory and Practice
  - Interfaith and Religious Studies
  - Medical Humanities
  - Philosophy, Arts, and Humanities
  - Philosophy, Science & Technology
  - Writing and Publishing
- Intermediate Proficiency Certificates
  - Arabic
  - Chinese
  - French
  - German
  - Hebrew
  - Italian
  - Japanese
  - Korean
  - Spanish
- Minors
  - Africana Studies
  - Anthropology
  - Arabic
  - Astrophysics
  - Bioinformatics
  - Biological Sciences
  - Biophysics
  - Bioscience and Society
  - Chemistry
  - Chinese
  - Communication
  - Computer Crime
  - Criminal Justice
  - Ecology
  - English
  - Environmental Studies
  - French
  - Geoscience
  - German
  - Global Studies
  - History
  - Human Factors and Ergonomics
  - Italian Studies
  - Japanese
  - Judaic Studies
  - Korean
  - Mathematics
  - Neuroscience
  - Nonprofit Communication
  - Philosophy
  - Physics
  - Politics
  - Psychology
  - Science, Technology & Society
  - Sociology
  - Spanish
  - Women's and Gender Studies
  - Writing

== Sources ==
- College of Arts and Sciences: About CoAS
- Drexel University Catalog: The College of Arts and Sciences
