= Comanche, Oklahoma =

Town in Oklahoma, United States

- City
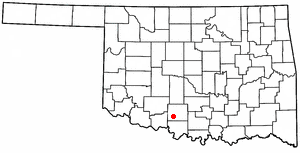
- Location of Comanche, Oklahoma
- Coordinates: 34°20′31″N 97°51′58″W
- Country: United States
- State: Oklahoma
- County: Stephens

Government

Area
  - Total: 4.27 sq mi (11.06 km^{2})
  - Land: 4.24 sq mi (10.97 km^{2})
  - Water: 0.035 sq mi (0.09 km^{2})
- Elevation: 1,083 ft (330 m)

Population (2020)
  - Total: 1,378
  - Density: 325.3/sq mi (125.59/km^{2})
- Time zone: UTC-6 (Central (CST))
  - Summer (DST): UTC-5 (CDT)
- ZIP code: 73529
- Area code: 580
- FIPS code: 40-16450
- GNIS feature ID: 2410206
- Website: cityofcomanche.com

Comanche is a city in Stephens County, Oklahoma, United States. The population was 1,378 at the time of the 2020 Census.

== History ==
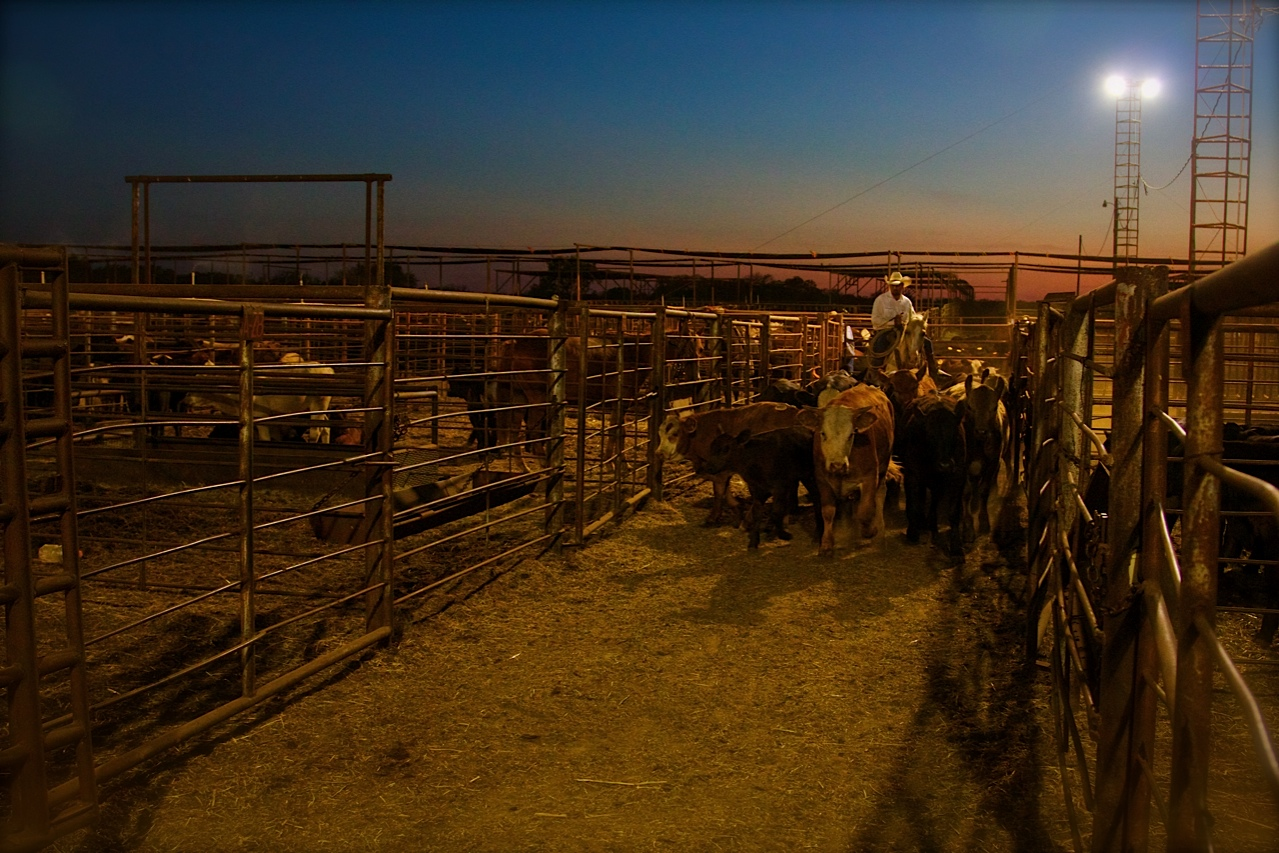
Cattle auction in Comanche

Comanche is a small city in southwest Oklahoma, set in rolling prairie land interspersed with oil fields, ranches, farms, pecan orchards, and timbered areas.

Comanche is located in what was once the famous Louisiana Purchase, a part of which was later in 1855 designated Indian Territory and set aside for the Five Civilized Tribes. Comanche then became part of the Chickasaw Nation and was identified as Comanche, Indian Territory, until statehood in 1907.

The city has had a series of names. The first settlers lived north of the present site and called the settlement Tucker. With the coming of the Rock Island Railroad in 1892, Indian landowner Johnny D. Wilson gave the city its present site on the railroad, and the Tucker post office was moved here in 1893. Many had wanted to call it Wilson Town, and some called it Border Queen because of the annual large celebrations, carnivals, bands, and Indian activities. Mr. Wilson, however, insisted it be named Comanche because of the Comanche Indians who roamed here.

Comanche was incorporated November 23, 1898, and began its progress located about two miles (3.2 km) east of present-day Comanche. The cattle were driven from Texas, through Indian Territory to Kansas for shipment east. Parts of this historic trail can still be clearly seen today.

== Geography ==
According to the United States Census Bureau, the city has a total area of 4.6 square miles (12 km^{2}), all land.

== Climate ==
Climate data for Comanche, Oklahoma
Month	Jan	Feb	Mar	Apr	May	Jun	Jul	Aug	Sep	Oct	Nov	Dec	Year
Mean daily maximum °F (°C)	49.3 (9.6)	54.8 (12.7)	64.2 (17.9)	74.1 (23.4)	81.3 (27.4)	88.9 (31.6)	94.9 (34.9)	94.1 (34.5)	85.5 (29.7)	75.4 (24.1)	63.1 (17.3)	52.8 (11.6)	73.2 (22.9)
Mean daily minimum °F (°C)	25.6 (−3.6)	30.6 (−0.8)	39.4 (4.1)	50.8 (10.4)	58.7 (14.8)	66.9 (19.4)	71.3 (21.8)	70.1 (21.2)	62.8 (17.1)	50.9 (10.5)	39.7 (4.3)	29.9 (−1.2)	49.7 (9.8)
Average precipitation inches (mm)	1.2 (30)	1.7 (43)	2.6 (66)	3 (76)	5.1 (130)	4 (100)	2.3 (58)	2.4 (61)	4.4 (110)	3.4 (86)	2.2 (56)	1.5 (38)	33.7 (860)
Source 1: weather.com
Source 2: Weatherbase.com

== Demographics ==
Historical population
Census	Pop.	Note	%±
1900	547		—
1910	1,301		137.8%
1920	1,427		9.7%
1930	1,704		19.4%
1940	1,533		−10.0%
1950	2,083		35.9%
1960	2,082		0.0%
1970	1,862		−10.6%
1980	1,937		4.0%
1990	1,695		−12.5%
2000	1,556		−8.2%
2010	1,663		6.9%
2020	1,378		−17.1%
U.S. Decennial Census

=== 2020 census ===
As of the 2020 census, Comanche had a population of 1,378. The median age was 41.1 years. 24.5% of residents were under the age of 18 and 20.9% of residents were 65 years of age or older. For every 100 females there were 88.5 males, and for every 100 females age 18 and over there were 91.5 males age 18 and over.

0% of residents lived in urban areas, while 100.0% lived in rural areas.

There were 603 households in Comanche, of which 35.0% had children under the age of 18 living in them. Of all households, 39.8% were married-couple households, 20.9% were households with a male householder and no spouse or partner present, and 32.7% were households with a female householder and no spouse or partner present. About 33.8% of all households were made up of individuals and 17.9% had someone living alone who was 65 years of age or older.

There were 770 housing units, of which 21.7% were vacant. Among occupied housing units, 62.5% were owner-occupied and 37.5% were renter-occupied. The homeowner vacancy rate was 4.5% and the rental vacancy rate was 11.2%.

Racial composition as of the 2020 census
Race	Percent
White	79.9%
Black or African American	0.5%
American Indian and Alaska Native	7.5%
Asian	0%
Native Hawaiian and Other Pacific Islander	0%
Some other race	2.1%
Two or more races	10.0%
Hispanic or Latino (of any race)	6.0%

=== 2000 census ===
As of the 2000 census, there were 1,556 people, 642 households, and 446 families residing in the city. The population density was 340.1 inhabitants per square mile (131.3/km^{2}). There were 757 housing units at an average density of 165.5 per square mile (63.9/km^{2}). The racial makeup of the city was 87.53% White, 0.06% African American, 8.35% Native American, 0.26% Asian, 0.64% from other races, and 3.15% from two or more races. Hispanic or Latino of any race were 1.74% of the population.

There were 642 households, out of which 30.7% had children under the age of 18 living with them, 53.6% were married couples living together, 10.7% had a female householder with no husband present, and 30.5% were non-families. 27.7% of all households were made up of individuals, and 15.6% had someone living alone who was 65 years of age or older. The average household size was 2.42 and the average family size was 2.96.

In the city, the population was spread out, with 25.5% under the age of 18, 9.6% from 18 to 24, 24.6% from 25 to 44, 22.4% from 45 to 64, and 17.9% who were 65 years of age or older. The median age was 38 years. For every 100 females, there were 95.0 males. For every 100 females age 18 and over, there were 91.3 males.

The median income for a household in the city was $24,960, and the median income for a family was $28,654. Males had a median income of $26,250 versus $17,500 for females. The per capita income for the city was $13,612. About 20.1% of families and 21.8% of the population were below the poverty line, including 34.3% of those under age 18 and 13.4% of those age 65 or over.

== Education ==
Comanche is served by the Comanche Public School system and the nearby Cameron University branch located in Duncan.

== Notable people ==
- Alvin Dark, World Series champion with the New York Giants as their shortstop in 1954 and with the Oakland Athletics as their manager in 1974, was born in Comanche.
- Viola Fletcher, survivor of the Tulsa race massacre, was born in Comanche in 1914
- Boyd Franklin Morgan Actor and American football running back in the National Football League for the Washington Redskins.

== Recreation ==
Recreation in the Comanche Area is divided into lake activities and sports. Waurika Lake, a 10,000-acre (40 km^{2}) lake, lies eight to ten miles (16 km) southwest of Comanche on access roads. The lake's recreational area offers all related activities (camping, swimming, fishing, boating, and hunting). Comanche Lake, three miles (4.8 km) east on Hwy. 53, offers the same recreations on a smaller scale.

== Government ==
Comanche has a Council Manager Form of Government. Progress is encouraged by Comanche citizens, officials, and civic groups.

== Media ==
Comanche and its surrounding area is served by the weekly newspaper "The Comanche Times"
