= 1322 Golden Empire Tower =

Residential skyscraper in Manila, Philippines

- Interactive map of the 1322 Golden Empire Tower area

General information
- Status: Completed
- Type: Residential
- Location: 1322 Roxas Boulevard, Ermita, Manila, Philippines
- Coordinates: 14°34′34″N 120°58′48″E
- Construction started: 1996
- Opening: 2002
- Owner: Moldex Land, Inc.
- Operator: CB Richard Ellis, Philippines

Height
- Roof: 203 m (666.01 ft)

Technical details
- Floor count: 55 above ground, 2 underground
- Floor area: 125,500 m^{2} (1,350,870.76 sq ft)
- Lifts/elevators: 10

Design and construction
- Architects: Architecture International, in cooperation with GF & Partners Architects
- Developer: Moldex Land, Inc.
- Structural engineer: Aromin & Sy + Associates
- Main contractor: D.M. Consunji, Inc.

1322 Golden Empire Tower (formerly known as 1322 Roxas Boulevard) is a 57-storey residential skyscraper in Manila, Philippines. It is owned by Moldex Land, Inc., part of the Moldex Group of Companies. Standing at 203 meters (666 feet), it is the tallest building in the City of Manila, and is the 12th-tallest building in the country and Metro Manila as well. The building has 55 floors above ground, and 2 basement levels for parking.

== Construction and design ==
The 1322 Golden Empire Tower was designed by international architectural firm Architecture International, in cooperation with local architectural firm GF & Partners Architects. Structural design was provided by Aromin & Sy + Associates, and was reviewed by Arup.

Other members of the design team are R.J. Calpo & Partners (Mechanical Works); DCCD Engineering Corp. (Electrical Works); NBF Water & Wastewater Services (Now N.B. Franco Consulting Engineers - Sanitary and Plumbing Works); Radian Technology, Inc. (Fire Protection Works); and I.P. Santos & Associates (Landscaping).

Consultants for the project include J.A. Shillinglaw & Associates (Curtain Walls); Dr. Salvador F. Reyes (Foundation); Rolf Jensen & Associates (Fire Protection); Mel Consultants Pty. Ltd. and Rowan Williams Davis & Irwin (Wind Tunnel Testing); and Horton-Lees Lighting Design Inc. (Lighting).

Technical services were provided by Philippine Geoanalytics (Soil Investigation) and Watcon Inc. (Hydrogeological Studies).

Project construction team include TCGI Engineers (Project / Construction Management); Davis Langdon & Seah Philippines, Inc. (Quantity Surveying); and D.M. Consunji, Inc. (General Contractor).

== Location ==
The building is located along Roxas Boulevard near Manila Bay. The building block is bounded by three streets in which it also has access points, namely, Roxas Boulevard, Padre Faura Street and Leon Ma. Guerrero Street.

== Features ==
Among the building's amenities are a fully equipped fitness center; sauna and private massage room; greens and mini-gardens; a swimming pool with bar and poolside party area, and a children's playroom

The building is equipped with high-speed elevators with control panels that prevent changes to floor destinations in mid-ascent or descent. It also has a CAT-5 UTP cables for voice, data and video communications that serve all information technology requirements; and lobby-to-unit video entry phone for guest identification.

For safety, the building has smoke evacuators in each floor designed to siphon smoke from the hallways in cases of fire, supported by automatic smoke/fire detection and alarm system with quick response sprinklers, and pressurized fire exits/stairwells.

The roof deck has a night-rated helipad, which can accommodate helicopter take-off and landing requirements in any time of the day.

The skyscraper is also equipped with a central Building Monitoring System (BMS) with technologically advanced equipment that supervise the entire property's security features.

== See also ==
- List of tallest buildings in the Philippines
