= Glen Krutz =

American political science scholar and author

Dean of the University of Colorado Boulder College of Arts and Sciences
- Incumbent
- Assumed office July 6, 2022
- Preceded by: Steven Leigh

Personal details
- Education: University of Nevada, Reno; Texas A&M University

Glen Krutz is an American political science scholar and author, served as the Dean of the University of Colorado Boulder College of Arts and Sciences beginning on July 6, 2022. He resigned 20 months later, stepping down from the role on June 1, 2024. Before his appointment at CU Boulder, Krutz served as the dean of the Oklahoma State University College of Arts and Sciences, where he also held the Puterbaugh Foundation Chair and was a professor in the Department of Political Science.

== Early life and education ==
Glen Krutz completed his undergraduate and master's degrees at the University of Nevada, Reno, and earned his doctorate from Texas A&M University.

== Career ==
Krutz's career has been marked by contributions to the field of political science, particularly in the areas of political institutions and public policy. He has held academic positions at Oklahoma State University and Arizona State University, demonstrating leadership in both teaching and administrative roles. He served as the dean of the College of Arts and Sciences at CU Boulder for 20 months until his resignation on April 15, 2024.

== Research ==
Krutz's research explores political institutions, public policy, agenda-setting, and institutional change. He has contributed to cross-disciplinary environmental projects and has authored several books, including "Hitching a Ride: Omnibus Legislating in the U.S Congress", "Treaty Politics and the Rise of Executive Agreements: International Commitments in a System of Shared Powers", and the open-source text about the American federal government.

=== Selected publications ===
- Krutz, Glen S. (2001). Hitching a Ride: Omnibus Legislating in the U.S. Congress. Parliaments and Legislatures. The Ohio State University Press. ISBN 978-0-8142-5071-6.
- Krutz, Glen S.; Peake, Jeffrey S. (2009). Treaty Politics and the Rise of Executive Agreements: International Commitments in a System of Shared Powers. University of Michigan Press. p. 264. ISBN 978-0-472-02211-3.
- Krutz, G. S. (2005). "Issues and institutions: "Winnowing" in the US Congress". American Journal of Political Science. 49 (2): 313–326. doi:10.1111/j.0092-5853.2005.00125.x.

== Awards and honors ==
Krutz has received the Patrick Fett Award of the Midwest Political Science Association, the E.E. Schattschneider Award from the American Political Science Association, and the Carl Albert Dissertation Award. He was also named the Outstanding Political Scientist of the Year by the Oklahoma Political Science Association.
