= Louie Mar Gangcuangco =

Filipino physician, HIV researcher & novelist (b.1987)

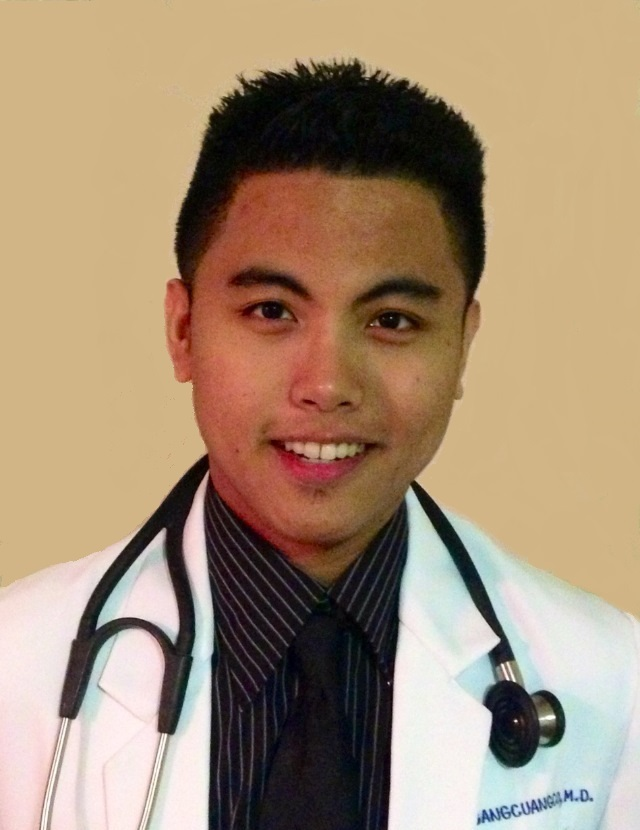
- Born: March 26, 1987 (age 39); Mandaluyong, Philippines
- Occupations: Novelist, Medical Doctor, HIV researcher, HIV counselor
- Writing career
- Notable works: Orosa-Nakpil, Malate, Gee, My Grades Are Terrific! A Student's Guide to Academic Excellence
- Website: www.researchgate.net/profile/Louie_Mar_Gangcuangco/

Louie Mar Gangcuangco (born March 26, 1987) is a Filipino physician, HIV researcher and novelist. He is the author of the novel Orosa-Nakpil, Malate (2006) and is working as Assistant Professor of Medicine for the Hawaii Center for AIDS at University of Hawaiʻi at Mānoa and as an HIV specialist and primary care physician at Waikiki Health Center. He also leads the Street Medicine program of Waikiki Health, in collaboration with the Waikiki Business Improvement District and The Institute for Human Services. In 2026, Gangcuangco was named to the Pacific Business News 40 Under 40 list.

== Early life and education ==
Gangcuangco finished his primary education in Montessori de San Juan (MSJ) in 1999. He graduated from Manila Science High School (Masci) in 2003.

Gangcuangco was two years accelerated in college under the Integrated Liberal Arts and Medicine (Intarmed) curriculum of the UP College of Medicine at the University of the Philippines Manila. He had his elective clerkship in Infectious Diseases at the David Geffen School of Medicine in UCLA. From June 2009 to April 2010, he trained under the Straight Internal Medicine Internship program of the Philippine General Hospital.

Gangcuangco received his BS in Basic Medical Sciences degree in 2007 and Doctor of Medicine degree from the UP College of Medicine in May 2010. He has a master's degree in Biomedical Sciences (Tropical Medicine) from the University of Hawaiʻi at Mānoa and a master's degree in Clinical Trials from the London School of Hygiene and Tropical Medicine.

== Career ==
In 2010, Gangcuangco headed one of the largest HIV testing projects among men having sex with men in Metro Manila. The findings were presented at the XVIII International AIDS Conference in Vienna, Austria and were published at the Southeast Asian Journal of Tropical Medicine and Public Health. The study entitled, "Prevalence and risk factors for HIV infection among men having sex with men in Metro Manila, Philippines," stirred national debate and attracted media attention because of the high HIV infection rate found among the participants.

In December 2011, Gangcuangco left his positions as faculty member of the San Beda College of Medicine (San Beda University) and the Ateneo School of Medicine and Public Health (Ateneo de Manila University) to pursue HIV research fellowship at the Nagasaki Institute of Tropical Medicine.

Gangcuangco trained in Internal Medicine at Bridgeport Hospital in Bridgeport, Connecticut. In 2017, Gangcuangco was placed on one year of probation after being accused of fourth-degree sexual assault by a patient. The case led him to lose his position at Bridgeport Hospital, and upon expiration of his visa, Gangcuango returned to the Philippines under the Balik Scientist Program of the Philippine Department of Science and Technology. He then returned to Griffin Hospital in Connecticut and completed a Preventive Medicine residency program in 2020.

After completing Preventive Medicine residency, Gangcuangco joined the University of Hawaii and served as the director of the Pacific AIDS Education and Training Center for Hawaii and US-affiliated Pacific Islands. Gangcuangco currently serves as Assistant Professor of Medicine at the Hawaii Center for AIDS. His research projects are focused on the cardio-metabolic complications of HIV and aging, neuro-cognitive dysfunction, and inflammation. He is also affiliated with the Queen's Medical Center. Gangcuangco currently serves as Assistant Professor of Medicine at the Hawaii Center for AIDS. His research projects are focused on the cardio-metabolic complications of HIV and aging, neuro-cognitive dysfunction, and inflammation.

Dr Gangcuangco served as a guest editor for the journal Tropical Medicine and Infectious Diseases journal on the special issue of HIV Transmission and Control. He also serves as an Editorial Board member for the journal Therapeutic Advances in Infectious Diseases (Sage Publishing).

== Published books ==
=== Orosa-Nakpil, Malate (2006) ===
Gangcuangco's interest in infectious diseases inspired him at 18 years old, to write the novel, Orosa-Nakpil, Malate, which was published in 2006. It is an anthropological exposition of the mechanics of HIV transmission in the Philippine gay district of Malate, Manila.

Orosa-Nakpil, Malate is critically acclaimed for promoting HIV and AIDS awareness. It was featured in the talk show Sharon in June 2006, in an episode aired internationally through The Filipino Channel. In August 2006, Gangcuangco was awarded the Y Idol Award (Youth Idol Award) by Studio 23’s Y Speak. Later that month, the Sentro ng Wikang Filipino conferred a Sertipiko ng Pagpapahalaga for Orosa-Nakpil, Malate.

Orosa-Nakpil, Malate became a National Book Store Best Seller in April 2007. It has been featured in several publications, including the Generation Pink Magazine’s The Great Escape Issue; The Flame: The Official Liberal Journal of the Humanities of the University of Santo Tomas; Icon Magazine’s Career Issue; The Manila Collegian, The Nightmare Before Christmas Issue; and The Philippine Star’s My Favorite Book, Sunday Lifestyle.

=== Gee, My Grades Are Terrific (2008) ===
In 2008, Gangcuangco published his second book, Gee, My Grades Are Terrific: A Student’s Guide to Academic Excellence, a self-help book for students. The English version of Orosa-Nakpil, Malate was released in September 2009 and the second edition of Gee My Grades Are Terrific was published in August 2011. Gangcuangco is considered by Pinoy Panitikan as one of the most influential authors of the Philippines.
