= K.P.M. Trust =

K.P.M. Trust is an educational trust established in 1972 to provide educational services in the Coimbatore region of India.

The trust runs the Rathinam College Technology Park and seven education institutions:

- Rathinam College of Arts and Science
- Rathinam Technical Campus
- Rathinam Institute of Management
- Rathinam School of Architecture
- Rathinam College of Physiotherapy
- KPM Matriculation Higher Secondary School
- KPM Primary School

The trust currently has about 2500 students attending these institutions.
