= Manila Science High School =

Public high school in Manila, Philippines

- Mataás na Páaraláng Pang-aghám ng Maynilà (Filipino)

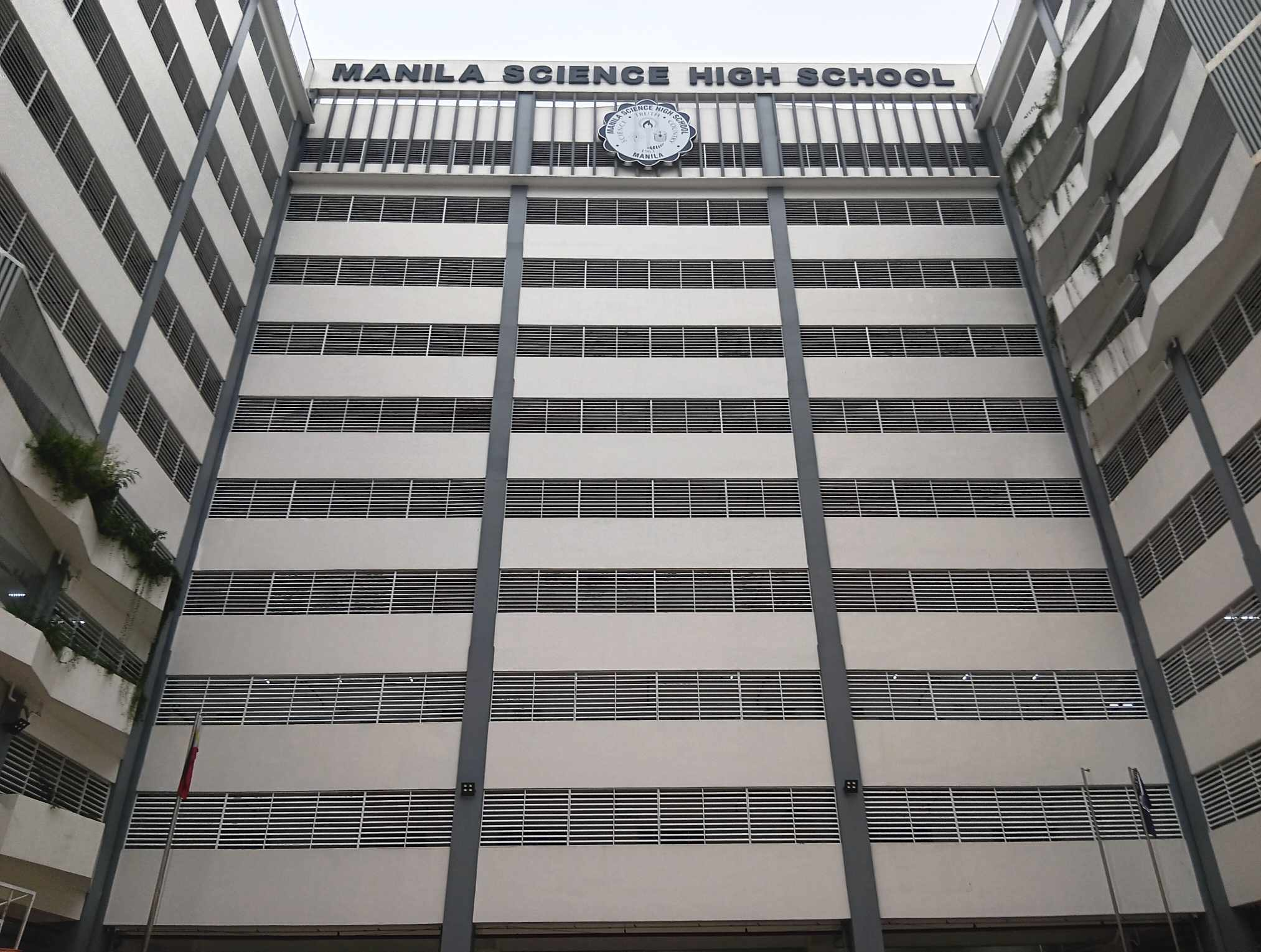
- Façade of the new main building

Location
- Taft Avenue corner Padre Faura Street, Ermita; National Capital Region; Manila; Philippines; 14°34′50″N 120°59′10″E

Information
- School type: Public Science High School
- Motto: Science, Truth, and Country (Agham, Katotohanan, at Bayan)
- Established: 1963
- Founder: Augusto Alzona
- School district: District 5
- Principal: Mr. Mark Gil Tabor (July 2024 – present)
- Grades: 7 to 12
- Enrollment: 1,875 Students (S.Y. 2025-2026)
- Language: English, Filipino, Spanish, Japanese, Mandarin and French
- Campus: Manila
- Campus size: 1 hectare
- Student Union/Association: SSLG (Supreme Secondary Learner Government)
- Colors: Royal blue and white
- Slogan: Sustaining the Tradition of Excellence
- Song: Awit ng MPPM
- Fight song: MaSci High Cheer
- Teams: ATOM (AThletes Of Masci)
- Newspaper: 'The Nucleus' (English) 'Ang Ubod' (Filipino)
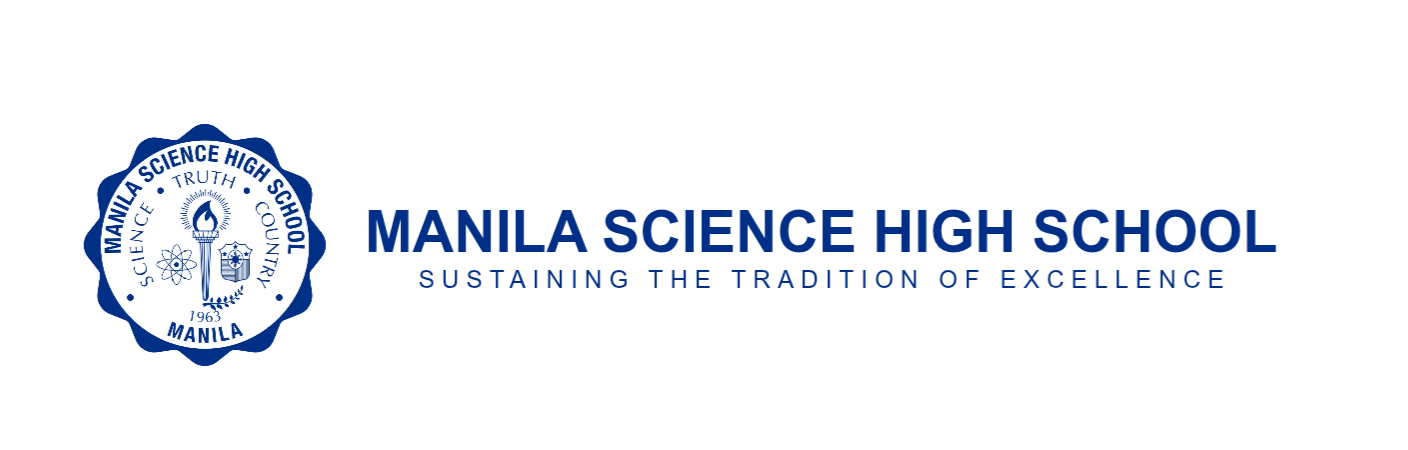

Manila Science High School (Filipino: Mataás na Páaraláng Pang-aghám ng Maynilà), colloquially known as MaSci, is a public science high school in the Philippines. It is located at the corner of Taft Avenue and Padre Faura Street in Ermita, Manila. Established on October 1, 1963, it is the first science high school in the Philippines.

== History ==
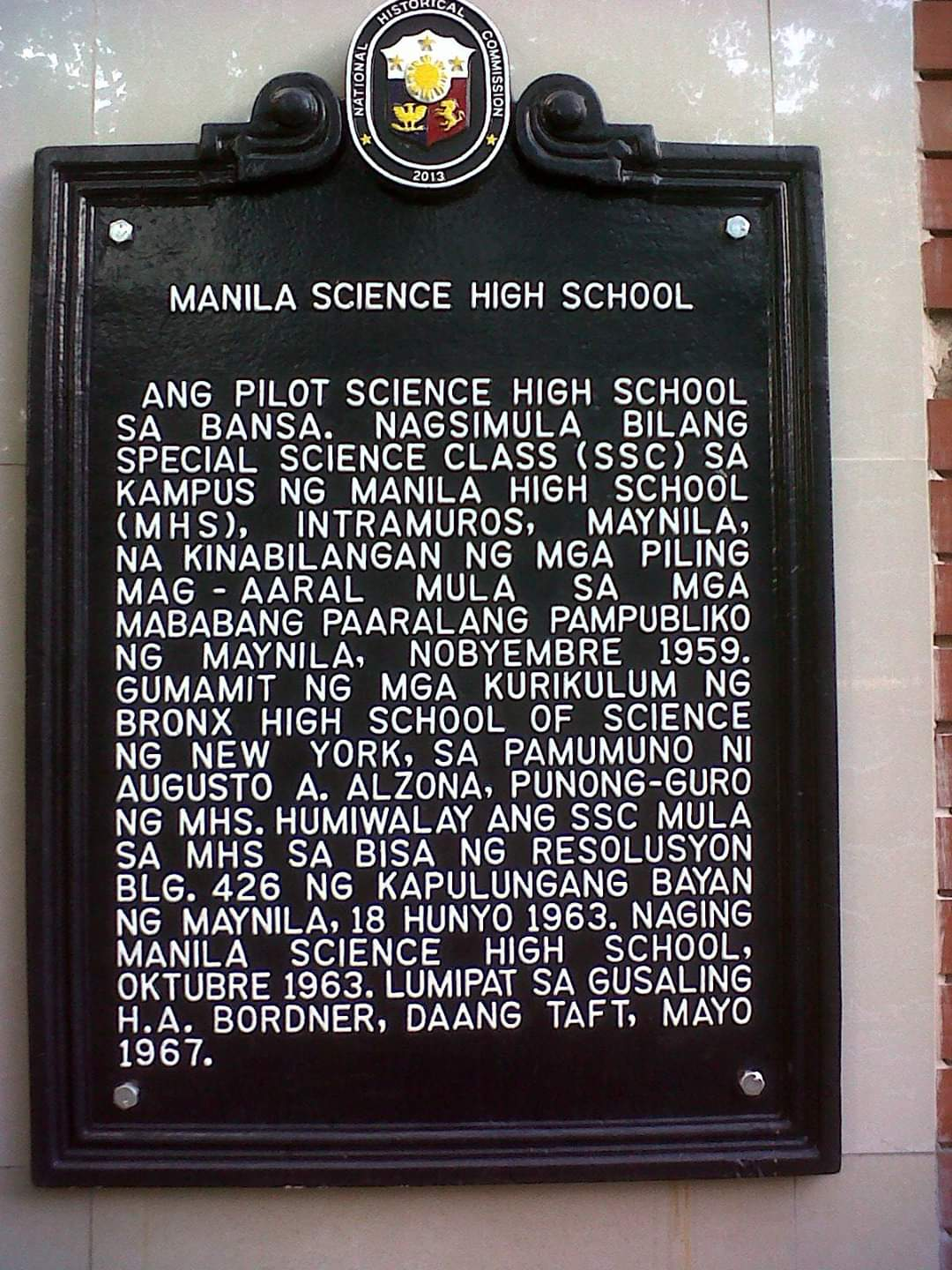
Historical marker installed in 2013.

Ramon Magsaysay, the 7th President of the Philippines, was the first to envision a Science High School in the Philippines in his 1956 State of the Nation Address where he underscored the great need of stepping up the development of fundamental and applied research in science and technology which has "long been neglected."

Taking action, the Philippine Congress passed Republic Act No. 1606, creating the National Science Board, composed of representatives from the following institutions: the National Research Council of the Philippines, the University of the Philippines, the Science Foundation of the Philippines, the Institute of Science and Technology, the Philippine Association for the Advancement of Science, the Philippine Confederation of Professional Organizations, the Department of Agriculture and Natural Resources (now the departments of Agriculture and Environment and Natural Resources), the Department of Health, the Department of Commerce and Industry (now the Department of Trade and Industry), various manufacturing industries, and the National Economic Council.

This was closely followed by Republic Act No. 2067, known as the Science Act of 1958, which proposed to integrate, coordinate, and intensify scientific and technological research and development to foster invention, whilst also renaming the board as the National Science Development Board (now known as the Department of Science and Technology).

In conjunction, the Department of Education implemented Republic Act No. 1606 by issuing Department Orders 1 and 5, series of 1958, for the launching of Science Talent Research.

November 25, 1959 marked the start of the school's journey. With 36 students screened through a competitive examination, the developing science high school had its beginnings in a single-storey building in Intramuros. In its second year, the section was called the "Special Science Class." March 28, 1963, witnessed each of the 32 graduates of the Special Science Class receive a gold medal. It was the first time in the history of Philippine education wherein each member of the graduating class was a gold medalist.

On October 1, 1963, Manila Science High School was established by virtue of Municipal Resolution No. 426 signed by Mayor Antonio Villegas. Credit for the school's early success goes to then Manila High School Principal Augusto Alzona – the "Father of Manila Science High School". Modeled after the Bronx High School of Science, the special science curriculum was designed to meet the needs of scholars gifted in science and mathematics. However, opportunities, training, and experiences in varied fields were also made available.

After five years in Intramuros, the school moved to its present site in Ermita in 1966 with its first principal, Honesto Valdez (1963–1977). By 1977, Phase I of the Main Building was completed while the construction of Phase II was still ongoing.

In September 1977, Evelina P. Barotilla, the second principal, saw the completion of the Manila Science High School Complex and the renovation of the H.A. Bordner Building. The Home Economics Building was built in 1980. The whole construction project was financed by the Special Education Fund under the chairmanship of Dr. Josefina Navarro, Superintendent of City Schools, Manila.

In 1988, the school's status was changed from city school to national high school, allowing students outside the City of Manila and the National Capital Region to be eligible for admission. From that year until 2000, Manila Science High School was further sharpened under the supervision of Daisy H. Banta. Her leadership saw the completion of the Computer Science building; she also spearheaded the School of the Future program, and the French language program. It was also during her tenure in 1999 that Manila Science ranked 1st nationwide in the National Secondary Achievement Test.

=== 21st century ===
The new millennium ushered in the arrival of Susan A. Yano, the fourth principal, the completion of the Antonio Maceda Building, and the revival of the Manila Science High School Alumni Association.

During the tenure of principal Flora A. Valdez, a government project in the Amadome was completed in time for the new school year, being formally inaugurated and turned over by Manila 5th District Representative Amado Bagatsing, the project's namesake, on September 8, 2010.

Due to the implementation of laws for the May 2010 polls, Manila Science did not have a principal until such time that the elected Mayor of Manila appointed new school administrators.

A groundbreaking ceremony for the construction of a new 10-storey building with a roof deck was held on July 26, 2021, during the mayorship of Isko Moreno. The new building would occupy a 3,690.80-square-meter (39,727.4 sq ft) lot on the site of the main building and the Antonio Maceda building. Each floor would cover 2,466.88 m^{2} (26,553.3 sq ft) and have two offices. There would be five elevators, each with a 24-person capacity. All of the 158 classrooms — each measuring 168 m^{2} (1,810 sq ft) — will be fully airconditioned. Other planned facilities for the new building include a 189 m^{2} (2,030 sq ft) library, a 270 m^{2} (2,900 sq ft) canteen, a 459 m^{2} (4,940 sq ft) auditorium, a 777 m^{2} (8,360 sq ft) gymnasium and a 1,187.56 m^{2} (12,782.8 sq ft) outdoor sports arena. On December 14, 2023, the new building was inaugurated and was turned-over to the school administration by Mayor Honey Lacuna. At that time, Mr. June Hayden R. Sinson was serving as the School Principal of Manila Science High School. He led the institution through the height of the COVID-19 pandemic and oversaw MaSci’s transition to online learning modalities.

In September 2021, the leadership was turned over to Dr. Ligaya G. Quides, who served as the Concurrent Principal while also holding the position of Principal at Raja Soliman Science and Technology High School. She later retired from government service.

On November 4, 2022, Mr. Manolo G. Peña was formally installed as the 13th Principal of Manila Science High School. He was known for his unifying slogan: “One MaSci” and “Talino para sa Kapwa”, which reflected his vision of inclusive excellence.

From February 2024 to July 2024, Dr. Roland L. Dela Cruz assumed the role of Concurrent Principal, temporarily leading the school while also serving as principal of Manuel A. Roxas High School. His stewardship ensured continuity in leadership until the appointment of the next principal.

On July 15, 2024, Mr. Mark Gil V. Tabor, former Head Teacher of Science, returned as the 15th Principal of Manila Science High School and began the full implementation of face-to-face classes in the newly turned-over 10-storey building, and strengthened the mechanism of school’s child protection policy. He currently serves as principal.

== Admission ==
Prospect students must take an entrance exam (either the Manila Science Admission Test or the United Science Highschool Admissions Test) to be admitted. In some cases, interviews are also held as an additional screening phase after passing the MSAT.

== Academics ==
One of the main features of Manila Science High School is its specialized curriculum focusing on Science, Technology, Engineering, and Mathematics (STEM). JHS students take multiple science and mathematics courses per year in contrast with the Department of Education's prescribed curriculum for regular schools. In addition, information technology and computer science subjects are offered for all JHS grade levels. Majority of the non-STEM courses (usually those under humanities) follow the competencies prescribed by the regular curriculum.

The SHS curriculum, on the other hand, follows the curriculum for all SHS institutions. At present, Manila Science only offers Science, Technology, Engineering, and Mathematics (STEM) strand.

=== STEM Courses ===
==== Science ====
First-year (Grade 7) students are introduced to fundamental concepts under general science, earth science, and environmental science. By the succeeding years they will take separate courses, each with full focus on one branch or subbranch of science. Students start with general biology on their second year (Grade 8), then progress to taking one chemistry course and one physics course simultaneously on their third and fourth year (Grades 9 and 10).

As of the S.Y. 2020-2021, electronics and advanced physics became separate courses, and the former was no longer under the school's science department. Meanwhile, robotics courses are offered as electives for Grades 9 and 10.

==== Research Program ====
In addition, JHS students also take a science research program. The research course is only offered for the first half of the school year; by the second half of the year, students focus on various specialized science courses (life science, physical science, and advanced biology). For Grade 10, however, research is integrated into the advanced chemistry course.

The research program for SHS includes both qualitative and quantitative research as prescribed by the Department of Education's SHS curriculum. In addition, students must produce their own research capstone project as a major requirement before graduating.

==== Mathematics ====
The mathematics curriculum at Manila Science provides students with advanced-level courses. Similarly to science courses, each math course focuses on a particular subdiscipline. Core subjects for all JHS students focus on algebra, statistics, geometry, trigonometry, and precalculus. All these are essential for students to advance to college-level mathematics in SHS.

For Grades 9 and 10, students may also enroll in advanced mathematics courses as electives. These courses primarily focus on competitive mathematics, as well as advanced statistics, number theory, calculus, and mathematical investigation and modelling.

==== Computer Science and ICT ====
The ICT course is offered for Grades 7 and 8, primarily focusing on the introduction to computing systems and software as well as computer science fundamentals including web programming. These courses serve as prerequisites for the formal computer science courses for Grades 9 and 10, where students delve deeper into computer programming, logic, and algorithmic thinking.

=== Non-STEM Courses ===
As a basic education institution, Manila Science follows the regular curriculum implemented in all schools for non-STEM courses, which include humanities, social sciences, and values education. Albeit, the competencies and teaching standards for these core courses were raised to keep up with the academic aptitude of the students. In addition, all Grade 10 students are required to take another humanities course. As for MAPEH (Music, Arts, Physical Education and Health) courses, the school employs separate teachers for music (and arts) and physical education and health.

=== Elective Courses ===
Incoming Grade 9 and Grade 10 students are required to take one (1) elective subject for a year. Elective courses offered include specialized topics in STEM, as well as journalism, business management, foreign languages, and technical writing. Most electives for Grade 9 are prerequisites to their respective courses for Grade 10; as a result, Grade 10 electives require enrollment in their prerequisite course in Grade 9. As of the recent school years, the mechanical drafting course has been removed from the roster of electives and is now made a required course for all Grade 9 students.

== Location ==
Situated along Taft Avenue, the school is widely accessible by public transportation through the Manila Light Rail Transit System (LRT) at Line 1, where the school is close to the United Nations Station, just a few meters away from the school campus. It is located in front of the Supreme Court and near Robinsons Place Manila, National Bureau of Investigation, University of the Philippines Manila, and Philippine General Hospital.

== Notable alumni ==
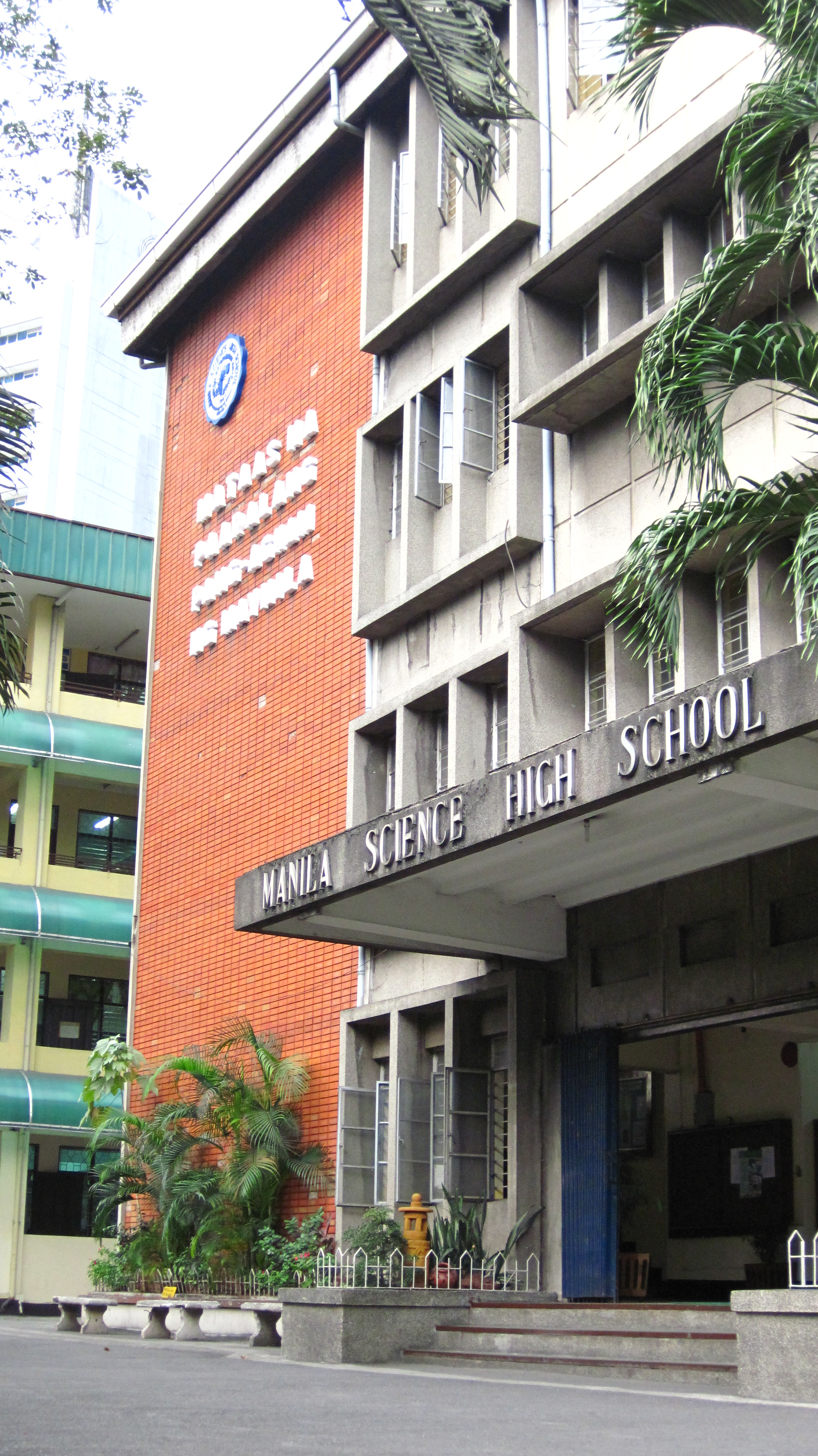
Old Manila Science High School façade

- Cristeta Pasia Comerford (Class of 1979)
  - Culinary artist and former chief cook for the White House. The first woman appointed in the position and the first of Filipino descent.
- Von Glenn Hernandez (Class of 1983)
  - Environmental activist and 2003 Goldman Environmental Prize winner
- Alvin Patrimonio (Class of 1983)
  - Professional basketball player, four-time Most Valuable Player of the Philippine Basketball Association.
- Beethoven V. Bunagan (Class of 1986)
  - a.k.a. Michael V., Philippine actor, composer, singer and parodist.
- Reev Robledo (Class of 1993)
  - Music composer, songwriter, teacher and author. He has written various theme songs for various television networks.
- Marizel Sarangelo (Class of 1997)
  - a.k.a Tuesday Vargas, Philippine singer, comedian and Talentadong Pinoy talent scout.
- Louie Mar Gangcuangco (Class of 2003)
  - Author of the best-selling Filipino novel Orosa-Nakpil, Malate; homosexuality, HIV-AIDS and gay literature activist
- Renee Co (Class of 2014)
  - Member of the House of Representatives of the Philippines for Kabataan Partylist since 2025
