= Saginaw Valley State University College of Arts and Behavioral Sciences =

Coordinates: 43°30′49″N 83°57′40″W

Saginaw Valley State University is a state university in Michigan in the United States. The College of Arts and Behavioral Sciences was the original college at the university when it was established in 1963.

== Undergraduate programs ==
- Applied studies
- Art
- Communication
- Creative writing
- Criminal justice
- English
- Gender studies*
- Gerontology*
- Graphic design
- History
- International studies
- Music
- Philosophy*
- Political science
- Pre-social work
- Professional and technical writing
- Psychology
- Public administration
- Social work
- Sociology
- Theatre
- Youth services*

Programs marked with an asterisk are only available as a minor

== Graduate programs ==
- Communication and multimedia (MA)
- Administrative science (MAS)

== Language Programs ==
- French
- German*
- Polish*
- Spanish
