= Ashram Public School =

Coordinates: 16.987971°N 82.239166°E

- Kakinada, East Godavari district, Andhra Pradesh; India

Information
- Type: Independent
- Motto: matru devo bhava pitru devo bhava acharya devo bhava
- Established: 1987
- School district: East Godavari District
- Chairman: Sri P. Bangara Raju
- Grades: LKG-12
- Campus size: 38 acres (150,000 m^{2})
- Website: www.ashrampublicschool.com

Ashram Public School (Telugu: ఆశ్రమ్ పబ్లిక్ స్కూల్) is a co-educational, English medium school in Kakinada, East Godavari district in the Indian state of Andhra Pradesh. It was founded in 1987 by a service-oriented private trust, Vishnu Sevashram and Yogashram. The trust is a non-profit organization that owns 38 acres of land with the objectives of propagating gurukulam (education), yoga and Ayurveda. The school includes a 5 hectare mango grove that provides a spot of greenery in the midst of a concrete jungle. The school opened in June 1987.

== Vision ==
The school aims transform students into respectable citizens imbued with principles, culture and refinement. The objectives of Ashram Public School is to provide an educational environment conductive to the intellectual, emotional and physical growth of its students.

== Academics and admissions ==
Ashram Public School, which is affiliated to the Central Board of Secondary Education, Delhi, offers education right down from kindergarten to Class 12. The academic session in the school usually starts from April 1 and closes on March 31, the next year. Admissions usually open in April and close by June.

== Infrastructure ==
=== Classrooms ===
There are three main buildings on the campus. The first is the administrative block located at the entrance. Following a short walk, you'll find the Tapaswiji block on one side, and opposite to it, the Swamy Swachandha block.

The administrative block hosts classes from playschool to 2nd standard, with sections A to J (maximum). The Swachandha block accommodates classes from 3rd to 7th standard, with sections A to G. The Tapaswiji block is dedicated to senior secondary classes, from 9th to 12th standard, and includes facilities for computer science, physics, chemistry, biology, and ATAL Tinkering labs.

All classrooms are spacious, with a capacity of 35 to 40 students, allowing for a conducive learning environment. Additionally, the school offers a wide range of extracurricular activities such as karate, singing, dancing, swimming, and spoken English classes, enriching the overall educational experience.

=== Library ===
The school's official website says that the library has about 12000 books in total in three languages, Hindi, Telugu and English.
