= University of North Dakota College of Arts and Sciences =

College at the University of North Dakota

Coordinates: 47.9247258°N 97.0675495°W

UND College of Arts and Science
- Type: Public
- Established: 1883
- Dean: Bradley Rundquist
- Faculty: 200+
- Undergraduates: 2,100
- Location: Grand Forks, North Dakota, USA
- Nicknames: A&S
- Website: arts-sciences.und.edu

The University of North Dakota College of Arts and Science (A&S) is the liberal arts and sciences unit of the University of North Dakota in Grand Forks, North Dakota. The College of Arts and Sciences was established in 1883, and is the oldest of nine colleges at the University, with over 200 regular faculty members in eighteen departments. The departments are organized into four divisions: fine arts, social sciences, humanities, and math & science. The college currently enrolls approximately 2,200 undergraduate students. It offers bachelor's, master's and doctoral degrees along with a number of undergraduate and graduate certificates. The Office of the Dean is headquartered in Twamley Hall, with departments housed in 9 buildings on campus.

== History ==
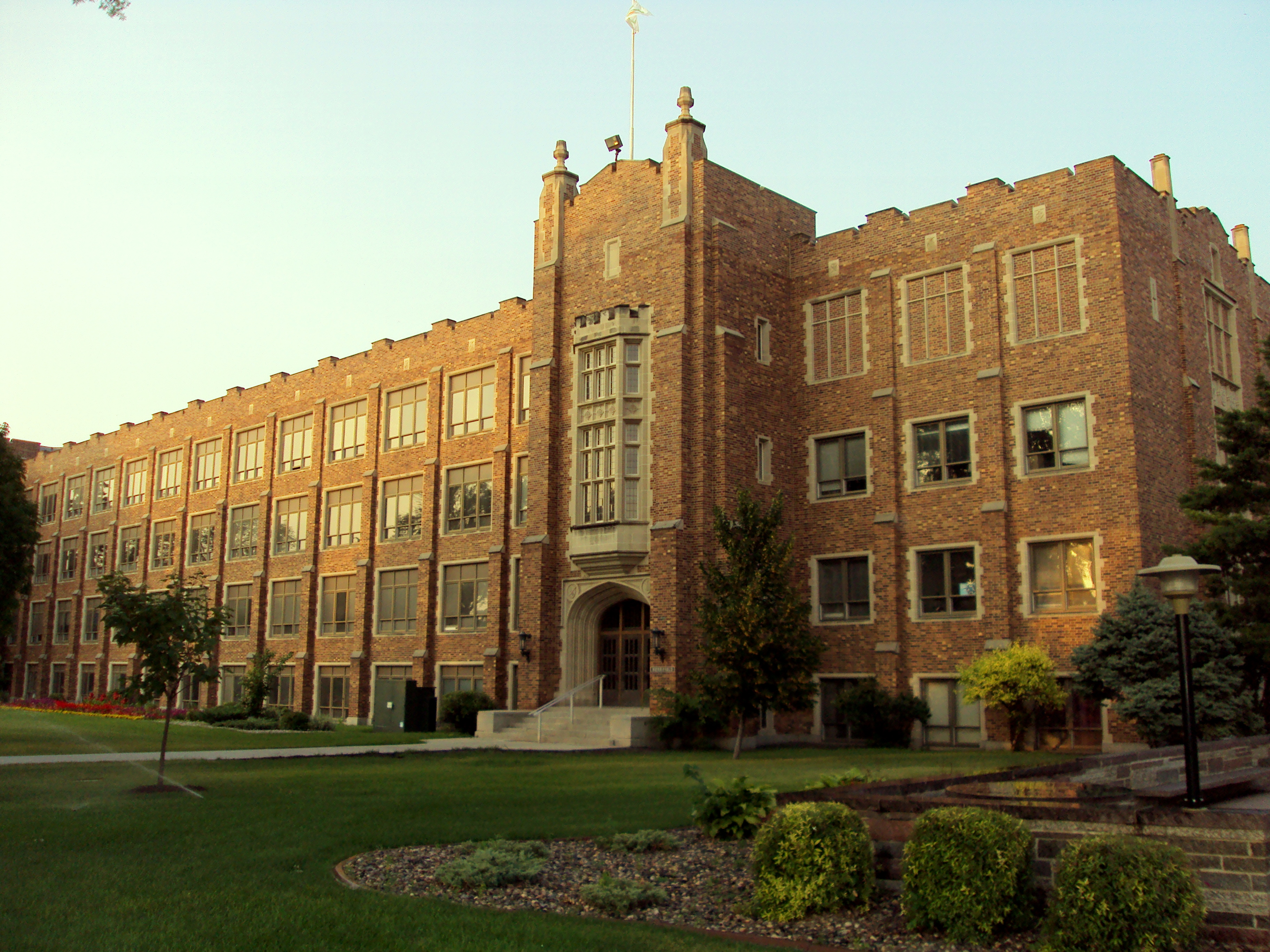
Merrifield Hall, (1929) Home to several departments in the College of Arts and Sciences

The College of Arts and Sciences dates from the founding of the University in 1883, and has had organic continuity from that date, in spite of some temporary changes in name and structure. The “Act for Establishing a Territorial University at Grand Forks” provided for a College of Arts “co-existent with” a College of Letters. In 1901 the name “College of Liberal Arts” was adopted, and retained until 1943, when “College of Science, Literature and Arts” was substituted. The latter name was kept until 1967. The President of the University served in effect as dean of the College until 1901, to be followed by George S. Thomas (1901-1911), Melvin A. Brannon (1911-1914), Vernon P. Squires (1914-1930), William G. Bek (1930-1948), Robert Bonner Witmer (1948-1965), and interim associate dean Philip A. Rognlie (1965–66). Bernard O’Kelly was dean from 1966 until his retirement in 1995 when he was succeeded by John Ettling (1995-1998). Albert Fivizzani served as interim dean (1998-2001) until Martha A. Potvin became dean (2001-2011). Kathy Tiemann served as interim dean from 2011 to 2013. In June 2013, Debbie Storrs was named the dean and held the position until 2018. Bradley Rundquist was named interim dean in July 2018 and permanent dean in July 2019.

The College includes 18 academic departments: Anthropology, Art and Design, Biology, Chemistry, Communication, Communication Sciences and Disorders, Criminal Justice, English, Geography & GISc, History & American Indian Studies, Mathematics, Modern & Classical Languages & Literatures, Music, Philosophy & Ethics, Physics & Astrophysics, Psychology, Sociology, and Theatre Arts. The College also includes eight special interdisciplinary programs: Environmental Studies, Forensic Science, General Studies, International Studies, Health Studies, Pre-Health, Social Science and Women & Gender Studies.

The College enrolls all undergraduates who wish to complete studies for the Bachelor of Arts, Bachelor of Fine Arts, Bachelor of Music or Bachelor of Science degree with concentration in some substantive or applicative field of study within the traditionally broad spectrum of the liberal arts.

About the College

- Established in 1883
- over 200 faculty members in 18 departments
- 4 divisions
- Enrolls 2,200 undergraduate students
- 37 undergraduate majors
- 7 accelerated bachelor's/master's programs
- 16 master's programs
- 9 doctoral programs
- 23 certificates

== Notable Events ==
- The UND Writers Conference, a literary conference that is free and open to the public.

== Notable alumni ==
- Maxwell Anderson, playwright, author, poet, journalist and lyricist
- Sam Anderson, actor
- Dennis Bounds, anchor KING 5 News
- Tom Brosseau, singer songwriter
- Phil Jackson, professional basketball coach
- Thomas McGrath, poet
- Michael Halstenson, musician and composer
- Jon Hassler, novelist
- Chuck Klosterman, author
- Irv Kupcinet, Chicago Sun-Times columnist; national syndicated talk show host; winner of 15 Emmy awards and a Peabody award.
- Shadoe Stevens, radio host, voiceover actor, and television personality
- Dave St. Peter, president of the Minnesota Twins
- Edward K. Thompson, former editor of LIFE magazine
- Era Bell Thompson, former editor of Ebony magazine
- Larry Watson, Milkweed National Fiction Prize-winning author
