= Silliman University College of Arts and Sciences =

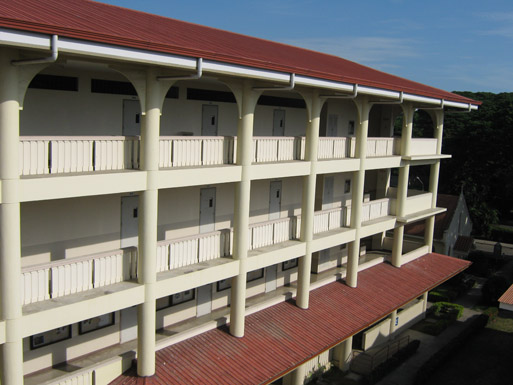
- Type: Private
- Established: 1909
- Location: Hibbard Avenue, Dumaguete, Philippines
- Website: www.su.edu.ph

The Silliman University College of Arts and Sciences is one of the constituent colleges of Silliman University, a private research university found in Dumaguete, Philippines. Granted Level III accreditation status by recognized accrediting agencies in the Philippine educational system, the College provides undergraduate and graduate instruction in various areas of learning such as in the fields of Anthropology, Creative Writing, English Language, Filipino, History, Literature, Philosophy, Political Science, Sociology, Physics, Chemistry, Biology, Mathematics among others.

The College traces its origins to the year 1909 when the then Silliman Institute offered its first classical two-year A.B. course. In 1921, the College obtained recognition for its offering of a four-year A.B. degree. At about the same time, a science course was also offered, a B.S. degree major in Chemistry.

From its early years of existence until the Second World War, the College operated as two independent entities: the College of Liberal Arts and the College of Sciences. Both were then administered by Silliman's Department of Instruction. These two colleges functioned independently of each other, housing departments such as Bible (1902), Biology (1909), Chemistry (1909), Mathematics (1920), English (1923), and Spanish (1936). In 1947, the College of Liberal Arts and the College of Sciences merged to form the present-day College of Arts and Sciences..

== Academics ==
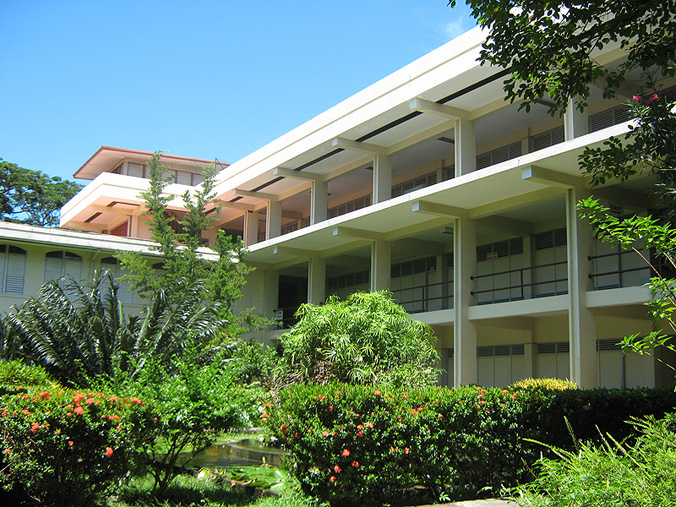
Science Complex

=== Departments ===
At present, the College is composed of the following departments:

- Anthropology and Sociology
- Biology
- Chemistry
- English and Literature
- History and Political Science
- Filipino and Foreign Languages
- Mathematics
- Philosophy
- Physics
- Psychology
- Social Work

== Alumni ==
- Carlos P. Garcia, 8th President of the Philippines
- Antonio Villamor, Ambassador to the Kingdom of Saudi Arabia.
- Lorenzo Teves, Senator of the Philippines
- Roseller Lim, Senator of the Philippines
- Robert Barbers, Senator of the Philippines
- Jesus Elbinias, Presiding Justice of the Philippine Court of Appeals.
- Vicente Sinco, 8th President of the University of the Philippines and founder of Foundation University
- Emilio Macias, Governor of Negros Oriental
- Leopoldo Ruiz, Philippine Consul-General at Chicago, U.S.
- Julian Teves, Governor of Negros Oriental
- George Arnaiz, Congressman, Negros Oriental
- Simeon Toribio, Filipino Olympian and Congressman
- Cornelio Villareal, Speaker of the House, Congress of the Philippines
- Guillermo Villanueva, Governor of Negros Oriental
- Felipe Antonio B. Remollo -Mayor of Dumaguete
