= Mater Dei College =

Private Roman Catholic college in Tubigon, Bohol, Philippines

Coordinates: 9°57′0.34″N 123°58′34.4″E

- Motto: Sapientia, Caritas, Oratio (Latin)
- Motto in English: Wisdom, Love, Prayer
- Type: Private, Catholic school
- Established: 1983; 43 years ago
- President: Dr. Mariano M. Lerin
- Undergraduates: Approx. 2493 (A.Y. 2026-2027)
- Postgraduates: Approx. 327 (A.Y. 2025-2026)
- Location: Tubigon, Bohol, Philippines
- Campus: 1
- Alma Mater song: "Mater Dei Hymn"
- Colors: Blue and White
- Nickname: MDC
- Website: https://materdeicollege.edu.ph

Mater Dei College (also referred to by its acronym MDC) is a private, Roman Catholic, co-educational basic and higher education institution located in Tubigon, Bohol, Philippines. It was established in 1983, with the school's full operation starting in 1984.

== History ==
It was during the term of Hon. Eufrasio Mascarinas as mayor of the town that the school was established. Bohol's prominent residents together with the local government unit had joined hands to build a community college for local residents who are economically challenged to send their children to big cities to obtain college education. During that time, Tagbilaran City was the only nearest place that offered college education and only few were capable of sending their children to Cebu and Manila for higher education.

It is through the efforts of then Sangguniang Bayan secretary, Cesar Mascarinas, parish priest Rev. Fr. Camilo Auza and an educator Lourdes H. Torrefranca, Ph.D., that conceived the idea of founding a college brought it into a reality. Finally, Resolution no. 78 (series of 1983) of the town council was passed to petition the then President Ferdinand Marcos to approve the opening of a private college in Tubigon. The first set of the Members of the board of trustees and Incorporators of the school were:

- Rev. Fr. Josemaria S. Luengo, Ph.D.
- Lourdes H. Torrefranca, Ph.D.
- Most Rev. Felix S. Zafra, D.D.
- Benjamin L. Mejorada, Ph.D.
- Msgr. Camilo V. Auza, H.P.
- Rose P. Alfafara, O.D.
- Mariano M. Lerin, Ph.D.; CPA
- Cesar C. Mascarinas, M.A.
- Dr. Isadora S. Pastor
- Atty. Mario Ortiz

== Colleges ==
Mater Dei College consists of six colleges namely:

- College of Accountancy, Business and Management- Business Department (CABM-B)
- College of Accountancy, Business and Management- Hospitality Department (CABM-H)
- College of Arts and Sciences and Technology (CAST)
- College of Criminal Justice (CCJ)
- College of Nursing (CON)
- College of Education (COE)

== Course offering ==
=== Graduate programs ===
- Master of Arts major in English Language Teaching (MA-ELT)
- Master of Arts major in Mathematics Teaching (MAMT)
- Master of Arts major in Educational Management (MAEM)
- Master of Arts major in Business Management (MABM)
- Master of Arts major in Public Services Management (MAPSM)
- Master of Arts major in Values Education (MAVED)

=== Baccalaureate programs ===
- Bachelor of Science in Nursing (BSN)
- Bachelor of Science in Information Technology (BSIT)
- Bachelor of Science in Computer Science (BSCS)
- Bachelor of Science in Information Systems (BSIS)
- Bachelor of Science in Tourism Management (BSTM)
- Bachelor of Science in Hotel & Restaurant Management (BSHRM)
- Bachelor of Science in Accountancy (BSA)
- Bachelor of Science in Business Administration (BSBA) in:
  - Financial Management
  - Marketing Management
  - Operations Management
- Bachelor of Science in Criminology (BSCRIM)
- Bachelor of Elementary Education (BEED) in:
  - Special Education
  - Pre-Elementary Education
- Bachelor of Secondary Education (BSED) in:
  - English
  - Filipino
  - Social Studies
  - Mathematics
  - Values Education
  - Science
- Bachelor of Physical Education (BPED)

=== Pre-baccalaureate programs ===
- Associate in Computer Technology (ACT)
- Associate in Hotel & Restaurant Management (AHRM)

=== Basic education ===
- Preschool
- Elementary
- Junior High School
- Senior High School
