= University of West Florida College of Arts and Sciences =

College at University of West Florida

Coordinates: 30.5495°N 87.2181°W

The University of West Florida College of Arts and Sciences (CAS) is the liberal arts college at the University of West Florida. It is the largest of UWF's three colleges.

== Organization ==
- Division of Anthropology and Archaeology
  - Department of Anthropology
  - Department of Archaeology
  - Florida Public Archaeology Network
- School of Allied Health and Life Sciences
  - Department of Biology
  - Department of Clinical Laboratory Sciences
  - Department of Nursing
- School of Fine and Performing Arts
  - Department of Art
  - Department of Music
  - Department of Theatre
- School of Science and Engineering
  - Department of Computer Science
  - Department of Electrical and Computer Engineering
  - Department of Mathematics and Statistics
  - Department of Physics
- Other departments and academic units:
  - Department of Chemistry
  - Department of Communication Arts
  - Department of English
  - Department of Environmental Studies
  - Department of Foreign Languages
  - Department of Government
  - Department of History
  - Department of Marine Biology
  - Department of Maritime Studies
  - Department of Philosophy
  - Department of Psychology
  - Interdisciplinary Studies
  - Student Success Programs
  - University Advising Center
  - University Honors Programs
