= Rathinam Global University =

Rathinam Global Deemed To Be University
- Type: Private, Deemed University
- Established: 2001
- Founder: Dr. Madan A Sendhil
- Accreditation: NAAC, NIRF, NBA, QS
- Affiliations: UGC
- Location: Coimbatore, India
- Campus: 10.9346°N 76.9786°E
- Website: rathinamglobal.edu.in

Rathinam Global University (RGU), officially Rathinam Global Deemed to be University is a private deemed university in Coimbatore, Tamil Nadu, India. It was established in 2001 by the Rathinam Arumugam Research and Education Foundation and is located within the Rathinam Techzone Campus on Pollachi Main Road, Eachanari. The university offers undergraduate, postgraduate and doctoral programmes in various disciplines and is recognized by the University Grants Commission (UGC).

== Rathinam Techzone ==
The management started a Software Park in 2002 within the college campus. Rathinam Software Park operates with 14 national and multinational IT/ITES companies. The management has also started a large scale IT/ITEs Park under Special Economic Zone (SEZ) scheme.

== Founder ==
The founder chairman of the college, Dr. Madan A Sendhil is an NRI with a postgraduate degree in Computer Engineering from the University of Central Florida. He also has worked for US organizations such as Motorola, Image Soft Technologies and Time Sys. He started Rathinam Educational Institutions and Software Technology Park in 2001. Prof. R. Manickam is the Chief Executive Officer and Prof. B. Nagaraj is the Chief Business Officer Rathinam College of Arts & Science is headed by Principal Dr. S. Balasubramaniyam.

== Rankings ==
Among arts and science colleges in India, Rathinam College of Arts and Science ranked 74th among arts and science colleges by India today in 2019 and Ranked no. 3 in the male-female student ratio in 2020. NIRF ranking 4 consecutive years. Ranked 13th best institution in Tamil Nadu by education world. Ranked 101 as top arts colleges in 2020 by outlook.

== Courses ==
=== Department of Commerce ===
- B.com.
- B.com. CA
- B.com. PA
- B.com. BPS
- B.Com. Banking and Insurance (B&I)
- B.Com. Information Technology (IT)
- B.Com. Accounting & Finance (A&F)
- B.Com. Financial Services (FS)
- B.Com. Corporate Secretaryship (CS)
- M.com.
- M.com. CA

=== Department of Computer Science ===
- B.Sc. Computer Science
- B.C.A. (Computer Applications)
- B.Sc. Information Technology
- B.Sc. Computer Technology
- M.Sc. Information Technology
- M.Sc. Computer Science
- M.Sc. Data Science and Business Analytics
- M.Phil. in Computer Science
- Ph.D. in Computer Science

=== Department of Mathematics ===
- B.Sc. Mathematics
- M.Phil. in Mathematics

=== Department of Management ===
- B.B.A. (Bachelor of Business Administration)
- M.B.A. (Master of Business Administration)

=== Department of Visual Communication ===
- B.Sc. Visual Communication & e-Media
- M.A. (Mass Communication and Journalism)

=== Department of Costume Design & Fashion ===
- B.Sc. Costume Design & Fashion

=== Department of English ===
- B.A. English Literature
- M.A. English Literature

=== Department of Science ===
- B.Sc. Physics

=== Department of Bio-Science ===
- B.Sc. Microbiology
- B.Sc. Biotechnology

== Academics ==
The college has autonomous status, and it is having its own Board of Study (BOS) Team.

Name and Designation	Position in the Council
Dr M. Muralidharan, Principal, Rathinam College of Arts & Science, Coimbatore	Chairperson
Prof. Padmanabhan, Dean of Academic Affairs and Controller of Examinations, STC, Pollachi, Coimbatore	External Member
Mr Abuthahir, Managing Director, Fatima Tyres (P) Ltd, Coimbatore	External Member
Dr Dharani, Managing Director, Orbito Asia Health Care and Diagnostics, Coimbatore	External Member
Mr Manikandan, Architect, DNA Studio and Design India (P) Ltd	External Member
Dr V. Narmathabai, Professor & Head, Department of Botany, Bharathiar University, Coimbatore	University Nominee
Dr V. Thayalan, Professor & Head, Department of Linguistics, Bharathiar University, Coimbatore	University Nominee
Dr R. Vijayaraghavan, Professor, Department of Statistics, Bharathiar University, Coimbatore	University Nominee
Dr G. Jagadeesan, Joint Director of collegiate Education, Coimbatore	State Government Nominee
Dr Madan A. Sendhil, Chairman Rathinam group, Coimbatore	Member
Dr S. Raja, Asst. Prof. in Computer Science	Member
Mr A. Uthiramoorthy, Asst. Prof. in Computer Science	Member
Dr Juliana Gnana Selvi, Asst. Prof. in Computer Science	Member
Mrs Jeyanthi Prasanna, HOD of Mathematics	Member
Mrs Hemalatha, HOD of Management	Member
Miss Dhanvi A, Asst. Prof. in CDF	Member
Dr D. Rajbalaji, Assistant Professor, Department of BCA	Member
Dr V. Parameswari, HOD of Tamil	Member
Dr Richard Robert Raa, HOD of English	Member
Dr Muralidharan, HOD of CS&BCA	Member
Mr V. Sathishanandan, HOD of Visual Communication	Member
Dr J. P. Kumar, Director, MBA	Member
Dr A. Sumathi, HOD of Commerce	Member Secretary

== Sports ==
Along with contemporary sports such as Football, Cricket, Volleyball, Basketball, Handball, Coco and Table Tennis, Rathinam College of Arts & Science also promotes traditional sports like Kabaadi and traditional martial arts like Kalaripayattu, Silambam also finds its place in the extra-curricular activities. The campus accommodates a cricket ground with training nets, a dedicated basketball court and a gym.

== Facilities ==
Classrooms are equipped with digital projectors and audio systems for interactive learning sessions. Separate hostels for boys and girls, a recreation centre, gym, wash centres for hostel students and restaurant with multiple food courts are the major facilities. There is also a fully functioning Entrepreneur Development Cell (EDC) to motivate and create Entrepreneurs.

== Community radio station ==
A community radio station named Rathinavani 90.8 is functioning inside the campus and it is maintained by the students.

== Notable Visitors to College ==
- Dr. K. Rosaiah – Governor of Tamil Nadu
- Dr Mylswamy Annadurai – ISRO Scientist
- Prof. H. Devaraj – Vice Chairman, University of Grants Commission, New Delhi
- Thiru. K. Baghya Raj – Director, Film Industry
- Padmashri Actor Vivek – Actor, Film Industry
- Mr. Karthik Raja – Composer, Film Industry
- Ravi Mohan - Actor, Producer, Film Industry
- Soori (actor) - Actor, Film Industry
- Dr. C. Sylendra Babu IPS – Commissioner of Police, Coimbatore Retd
- L. Murugan - Minister of State in the Ministry of Parliamentary Affairs of India
- V. Muraleedharan - Former Minister of State for External Affairs of India

== Student life ==
Along with periodical industrial visits, guest lectures and seminars there are few more extracurricular activities being conducted by the management.

Rathinam Fest: Each and every year, a mega state level cultural meet is being organized in the name of Rathinam Fest. Tycoons: Department of Commerce and Management are organizing an intercollegiate cultural festival named "Tycoons" which also gives importance to curricular activities such as paper presentations, seminars, quiz, etc.

== Alumni ==
The Rathinam Alumni Association is an international organization with chapters throughout the world, connecting alumni in networking, social events and fundraising.

== See also ==
- K.P.M. Trust
