= Ideal College of Arts and Sciences =

Coordinates: 17.08346°N 82.18650°E

Ideal College of Arts and Sciences (A), Kakinada
- Type: Autonomous Institution
- Established: 1970
- President: N. S. Murthy
- Principal: Dr T Satyanarayana
- Location: Kakinada, Andhra Pradesh, India
- Campus: Urban
- Website: idealcollege.edu.in

The Ideal College of Arts and Sciences is located in Kakinada, Andhra Pradesh, India. The Ideal Junior College and the Ideal College of Arts and Sciences are the result of work by educationists including P.V.N. Raju, Sri P.V. Ramana Murthy, P. Chiranjeevini Kumari, D.N. AppaRao, N.S.R. Sastry and Sri Mandalika Satyanarayana.

== Motto ==
The motto of the institution is "Vidya Darsaha - Viswa Sreyaha" - The ideals of education is to make universal harmony

== History ==
The Society got permission from the government in 1970 for a Junior College and in 1974 for the opening of the Degree College. The college now has B.A, B.Com and B.Sc with Computer Science, Agriculture, Fisheries, Food Technology, Food Science & Nutrition, BCA, BBA & BBA Digital Marketing at the graduate level and M.Sc. Applied Chemistry, M.Sc. Organic Chemistry, M.Sc. Analytical Chemistry, Master Business Administration (MBA), M.A.Economics, M.Sc. Applied Mathematics, Master of Computer Applications (MCA), M.Sc.Computer Sciences at the postgraduate level.

== Dr. PVN Raju Vidya Pranganam ==
The Junior College and Degree College are on "Dr. PVN Raju Vidya Pranganam", Samalkota Road, whereas engineering and postgraduate courses run in Narasanna Nagar, Vidyut Nagar, Kakinada.

== Ideal Institute of Technology ==
The Ideal Institute of Technology was established under the aegis of the governing body of the Ideal College of Arts and Sciences in 2009. It has permission from the All India Council for Technical Education, New Delhi and is affiliated to JNTUK, Kakinada.

The National Assessment and Accreditation Council (NAAC) accredited the college in 2024 with a grade of A.
