= Dorothy F. Schmidt College of Arts and Letters =

College in Boca Raton, Florida, U.S.

The Dorothy F. Schmidt College of Arts and Letters is located in Boca Raton, Florida and is one of the ten academic colleges of Florida Atlantic University. The D.F. Schmidt College of Arts and Letters is made up by several centers and schools focused on the humanities, social sciences, and liberal arts. It offers degrees at the undergraduate and graduate levels.

== Background ==
By 2003, the college was officially recognized for its namesake, the Dorothy F. Schmidt College of Arts and Letters. It currently offers 18 academic programs, including 26 bachelor's degrees, 17 minors, 12 certificate programs, and 20 graduate degrees. As of 2023, Dr. Michael J. Horswell (Ph.D., University of Maryland) serves as Dean of the college.

As one of the larger colleges that makes up Florida Atlantic University, the D.F. Schmidt College of Arts and Letters hosts some of the university's more prominent programs. This includes the Leon Charney Diplomacy Program and the 500-seat University Theatre located on the Boca Raton campus. In 2020, Florida Atlantic University opened the Avron B. Fogelman Sports Museum, the university's first sports museum, under the purview of the D.F. Schmidt College of Arts & Letters. The museum gained local popularity since its collection includes memorabilia from Babe Ruth, Kobe Bryant, and Tiger Woods.

== Offerings & Departments ==
=== Offerings ===
The college awards the following degrees:

Undergraduate

- Bachelor of Arts
- Bachelor of Architecture
- Bachelor of Fine Arts
- Bachelor of Music
- Bachelor of Music Education
- Bachelor of Public Management
- Bachelor of Public Safety Administration

Graduate

- Master of Arts
- Master of Fine Arts
- Master of Music
- Master of Public Administration
- Master of Nonprofit Management
- Master of Arts in Teaching
- Doctor of Philosophy

In addition to degree programs, the college offers a number of non-degree programs including certificates and professional development.

=== Departments & Schools ===
- Anthropology
- School of Architecture
- School of Communication and Multimedia Studies
- School of Public Administration
- Comparative Studies
- English
- History
- Languages, Linguistics, and Comparative Literature
- Music
- Philosophy
- Political Science
- School of Interdisciplinary Studies
- Sociology
- Theatre and Dance
- Visual Arts and Art History
- Women Gender and Sexuality Studies

== Accreditation ==
The college is fully accredited through the university by the Southern Association of Colleges and Schools Commission on Colleges
