= University of the Philippines College of Arts and Sciences =

Filipino college

University of the Philippines Manila College of Arts and Sciences
- Type: State, Non-sectarian
- Established: 1951 - as the UP Extension College in Manila
- Chancellor: Michael L. Tee, MD, MHPED
- President: Angelo A. Jimenez
- Dean: Ma Teresa G De Guzman, PhD
- Location: Rizal Hall, Padre Faura Street, Ermita, Manila, Philippines
- Website: cas.upm.edu.ph

The University of the Philippines Manila College of Arts and Sciences (CAS) is one of the nine-degree granting units of the University of the Philippines Manila. It is the largest college by population of UP Manila.

The college offers subjects under the general education curriculum. It provides education to around 1,200 non-CAS students and 1,700 CAS students annually. It is the college which offers the most number of subjects every semester.

== History ==
When the University of the Philippines transferred to Diliman, the U.P. Board of Regents approved a resolution creating a University Extension Division on June 21, 1951. The Division was to be located in the original Manila campus of the university, and had for its mission, service the working students. Courses offered included undergraduate subjects in the general education program leading to an Associate in Arts or a bachelor's degree in arts, Business Administration, Education and Law and three graduate programs: Master of Education, Master of Arts and Master in Industrial Management.

On November 22, 1966, the Board of Regents adopted a resolution specifying the Plan of Operations for the Extension Division which provided for the following: 1.) limitation of curricular offerings to undergraduate courses of the College of Arts and Sciences; and 2.) creation of an Academic Advisory Committee to oversee the program of courses with the Director of the Extension Division as chairman, and the Dean of the College of Arts and Sciences, U.P. Diliman and the Director for Undergraduate Studies as members. As a result of this resolution, the supervision of some of the programs, specifically the graduate program in education and the undergraduate program in Business Administration were transferred to the mother colleges. The Extension Division was also renamed College of Arts and Sciences, Manila unit. At this point, the future of the Extension Unit became uncertain.

In 1969, with the assumption of Salvador Lopez as U.P. President, the atmosphere of uncertainty somehow changed. In 1969, the Manila unit was elevated to college status with "U.P. Extension in Manila" as its new name and designation of its head was changed from director to dean. Prof. David G. Wico, director then, assumed the title of dean in his last year of service at the university.

After Dr. Bonifacio S. Salamanca took over as dean, the college experienced vigorous growth. Expansion included the institution of new degree programs, such as B.S. Biological Sciences and the appointment of more full-time faculty members and administrative personnel. This led to the creation of three academic committees which later evolved into the Divisions of Humanities, Physical and Biological Sciences, and Social Sciences.

In 1973, the name of the college was further changed to U.P. College in Manila.

On March 19, 1975, U.P. President O.D. Corpuz issued Administrative Order No. 17, advising the college to re-examine its goals. Dr. Nestor N. Pilar was appointed dean in 1978. The college's objectives of giving an arts and sciences education were re-emphasized. A new degree program, B.A. Development Studies was also offered.

When Atty. Edgardo J. Angara assumed the U.P. presidency, he created two committees: one to re-examine curricular offerings (Committee to Review Academic Programs or CRAP) and the other, the Management Review Committee or MRC to re-examine the organizational structure and management of the university. It was the latter's recommendation which was approved by the Board of Regents later embodied in Executive No. 4. This made possible the creation of the autonomous University of the Philippines in Manila on October 22, 1982.

This started the rapid growth of U.P. Manila. In 1985, under Dr. Benjamin Lozare, the Division of Physical and Biological Sciences was renamed Division of Natural Sciences and Mathematics and the B.S. Biological Sciences became B.S. Biology. New curriculum offerings which included B.A. Organizational Communication, B.A. Philippine Arts were instituted. Under the stewardship of Dean Angela P. Sarile, the CAS has 5 departments: Biology, Arts and Communication, Physical Education, Physical Sciences and Mathematics and Social Sciences.

== Departments ==
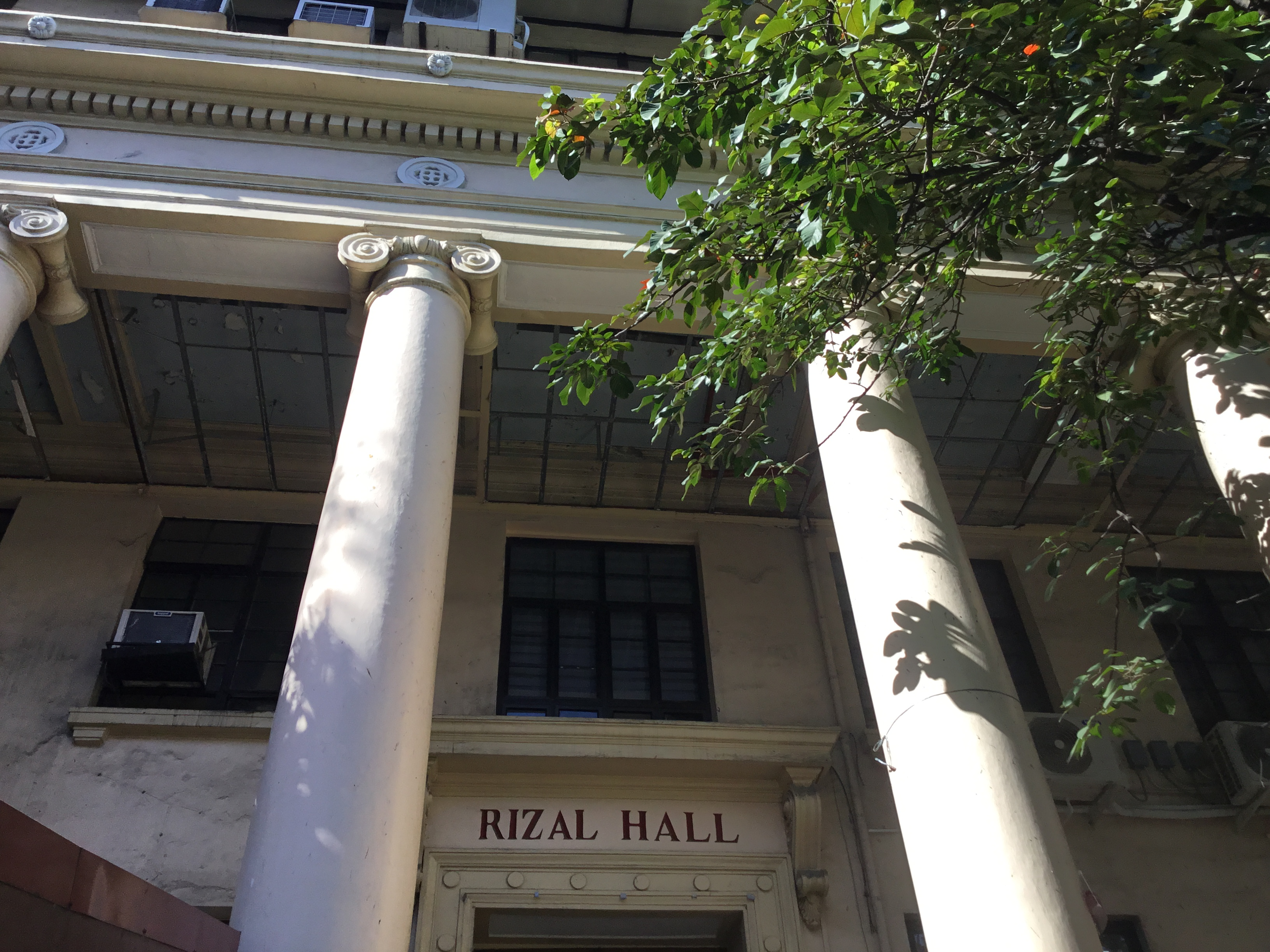
Entrance of the Rizal Hall.

The college is divided into six academic departments which offer courses in the Natural and Social Sciences, The Humanities and Physical Education.

- Department of Arts and Communication
  - Chair: Arwin M. Vibar, PhD
- Department of Behavioral Sciences
  - Chair: Archie Lawrence P Geneta, MA, RPsy
- Department of Biology
  - Chair: Kimberly B. Benjamin, PhD
- Department of Physical Sciences and Mathematics
  - Chair: Marie Josephine M. de Luna, PhD
- Department of Social Sciences
  - Chair: Ruth Shane E Legaspi, MBA
- Department of Physical Education
  - Chair: Ace C. Domingo, MSCHS

== Academic programs ==
The college offers the following academic degree programs:

- Undergraduate program
  - Bachelor of Science in Applied Physics (Health Physics)
  - Bachelor of Arts in Behavioral Sciences
  - Bachelor of Science in Biochemistry
  - Bachelor of Science in Biology
    - Biomedical-Environmental Science Track
    - Microbiology Track
  - Bachelor of Science in Computer Science
    - Major in Health Informatics
    - Major in Statistical Computing
  - Bachelor of Arts in Development Studies
  - Bachelor of Arts in Social Science (Area Studies)
  - Bachelor of Arts in Organizational Communication
  - Bachelor of Arts in Philippine Arts
  - Bachelor of Arts in Political Science
- Graduate Programs
  - Master in Management
    - major in Business Management
    - major in Public Management
    - major in Educational Management
  - Master of Arts in Health Policy Studies (in partnership with College of Public Health)
  - Master of Science in Health Informatics (Bioinformatics track)(in partnership with College of Medicine)

== Officials ==
Deans of the College of Arts and Sciences
Bonifacio S. Salamanca	1973-1978
Nestor D. Pilar	1978-1984
Benjamin V. Lozare	1984-1987
Angela P. Sarile	1987-1994
Fatima A. Castillo	1994-1997
Josefina G. Tayag	1997-2000
Marilou G. Nicolas	2000-2006
Reynaldo H. Imperial	2007-2012
Alex C. Gonzaga	2013-2015
Leonardo R. Estacio Jr.	2015–2021
Ma. Constancia O. Carrillo	2021-2023
Ma. Teresa G. De Guzman	2023-Present
