= Oklahoma State University College of Arts and Sciences =

Coordinates: 36.1232°N 97.0703°W

Oklahoma State University primary logo

The Oklahoma State University College of Arts and Sciences serves as the liberal arts and science components of Oklahoma State University in Stillwater, Oklahoma. The College of Arts and Sciences is the largest college at Oklahoma State University with over 24 departments and programs and a great diversity of students. The College of Arts and Sciences also encompasses the School of Visual and Performing Arts. The College of Arts and Sciences includes both undergraduate and graduate studies in many different fields and pre-med and pre-law training. Bachelor degrees include: Bachelor of Arts (BA), Bachelor of Science (BS), Bachelor of Fine Arts (BFA), and Bachelor of Music (BM).

The interim dean is Keith Garbutt, preceded by Glen Krutz.

== Departments ==
- Aerospace Studies
- Art
- Art History
- Biology
- Communication Sciences and Disorders
- Chemistry
- Computer Sciences
- English
- Foreign Languages
- Geography
- Geology
- Graphic Design
- History
- Integrative Biology
- Mathematics
- Media and Strategic Communications
- Microbiology and Molecular Genetics
- Military Science
- Music
- Philosophy
- Physics
- Plant Biology, Ecology, and Evolution
- Political Science
- Psychology
- Sociology
- Statistics
- Theatre
