= Allegheny University of the Health Sciences =

Allegheny University of the Health Sciences (1994–1998) was a medical school in Philadelphia that was formed in 1994 through a merger of the Medical College of Pennsylvania (MCP) and Hahnemann University. As part of MCP Hahnemann School of Medicine, the largest private medical school in the United States, Allegheny University was under the new University of the Health Sciences, which also included schools for allied medical disciplines. Prior to the merger, the Medical College of Pennsylvania had been the first medical school to be purchased by a hospital (Pittsburgh's Allegheny General Hospital). The new university and other hospitals all were units of the Allegheny Health, Education and Research Foundation (AHERF).

On July 21, 1998, Allegheny University of the Health Sciences became the first US medical school to declare bankruptcy with a deficit of $25–35 million as part of the financial collapse of the parent organization, which had run up a deficit under the policy of rapid expansion led by its president Sherif S. Abdelhak claimed to be $1.3 billion. Eight of the hospitals were taken over by the for-profit Tenet Healthcare Corporation in a deal where Tenet acquired the schools of the university, but induced Drexel University to manage them as the MCP Hahnemann University of Health Sciences.

In 2002 the MCP Hahnemann University of Health Sciences was merged into Drexel University as the Drexel University College of Medicine and the Drexel University College of Nursing and Health Professions.
