= University of the Philippines Manila =

Public university in Manila, Philippines

- Unibersidad ng Pilipinas Maynila (Filipino)
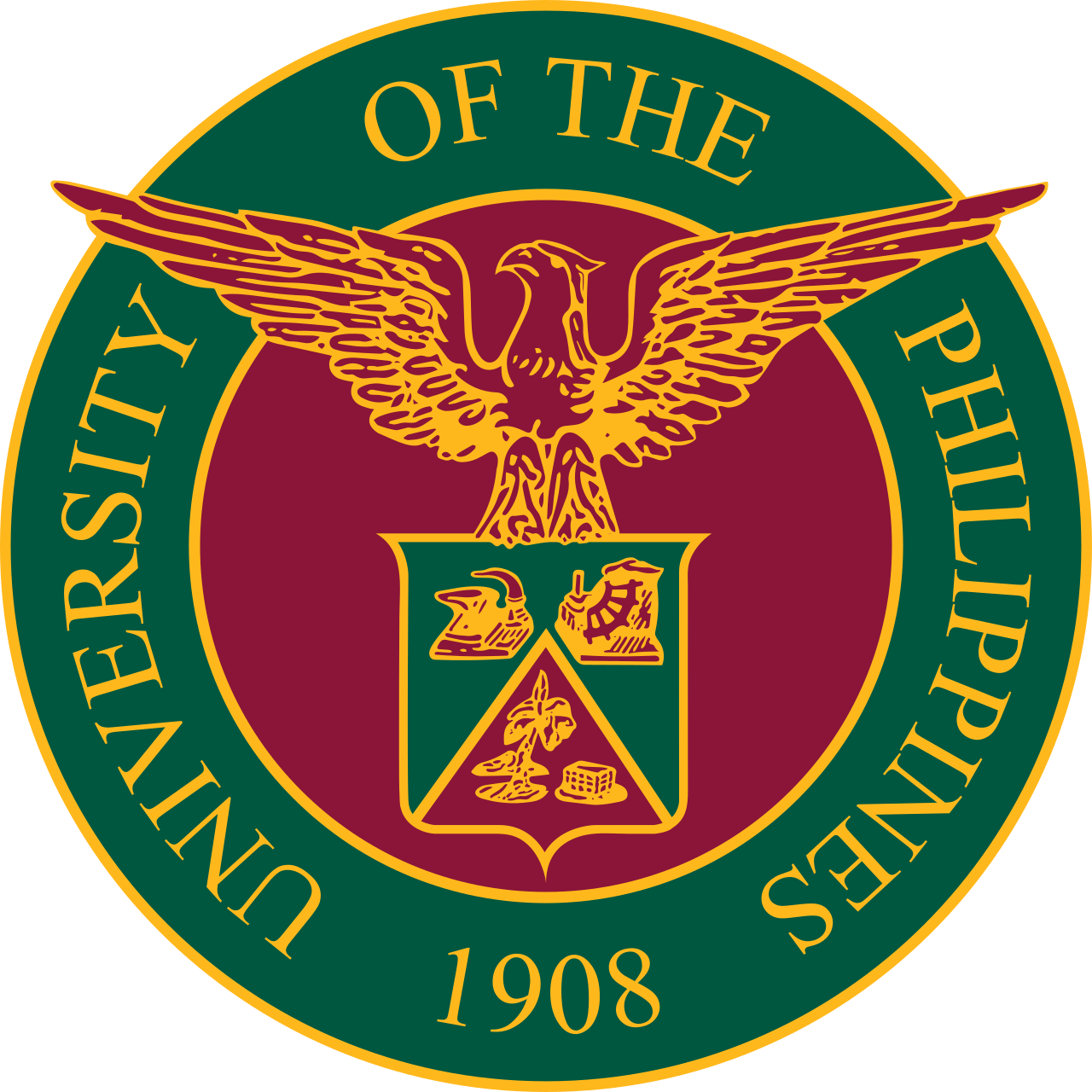
- Former names: Philippine Medical School (1905–1908); University of the Philippines (1908–1949); UP Extension in Manila (1949–1972); UP Health Sciences Center (1967–1982); UP College Manila (1972–1983)
- Motto: “Honor, Excellence, Service”
- Type: National University, Medical University, Research University
- Established: December 1, 1905 (120 years and 346 days)
- Academic affiliations: Association of Pacific Rim Universities; ASAIHL; ASEA UNINET; ASEAN University Network; South Manila Inter-Institutional Consortium
- Chancellor: Michael L. Tee
- President: Angelo Jimenez
- Students: 6,110 (2022)
- Undergraduates: 4,750 (2022)
- Postgraduates: 1,360 (2022)
- Location: Manila, National Capital Region, Philippines; 14°34′45″N 120°59′00″E
- Campus: Urban; total 14 ha (35 acres)
- Colors: UP Maroon and UP Forest Green
- Website: www.upm.edu.ph

- Location in Manila Location in Metro Manila Location in Luzon Location in the Philippines

The University of the Philippines Manila (UP Manila or UPM; Filipino: Unibersidad ng Pilipinas Maynila) is a public research university located in Ermita, Manila, Philippines. It is the oldest of nine constituent universities of the University of the Philippines System and serves as the primary institution for health sciences within the system.

While the University of the Philippines was formally established by the University Act of 1908, the Manila campus traces its institutional origins to the establishment of UP’s Manila-based colleges and school between 1909 and 1911, as the capital city was the intended site for the university's main operations. In 1979, the campus was reorganized as the Health Sciences Center, becoming the second autonomous constituent unit of the UP System. It was officially renamed the University of the Philippines Manila in 1983. Its academic programs are primarily concentrated in medicine, dentistry, pharmacy, public health, nursing, and the allied health sciences, offering a range of undergraduate, graduate, and professional degrees.

UP Manila administers and operates the Philippine General Hospital, the largest public hospital in the Philippines and the country’s national referral center for tertiary health care. The university is also home to the National Institutes of Health (NIH).

Its 14-hectare campus occupies two large city blocks. The campus contains pre-war heritage buildings and structures built during the American Period and designed by American architect William E. Parsons. These were declared to be historical landmarks by the National Historical Commission of the Philippines.

== History ==
=== Philippine Medical School ===
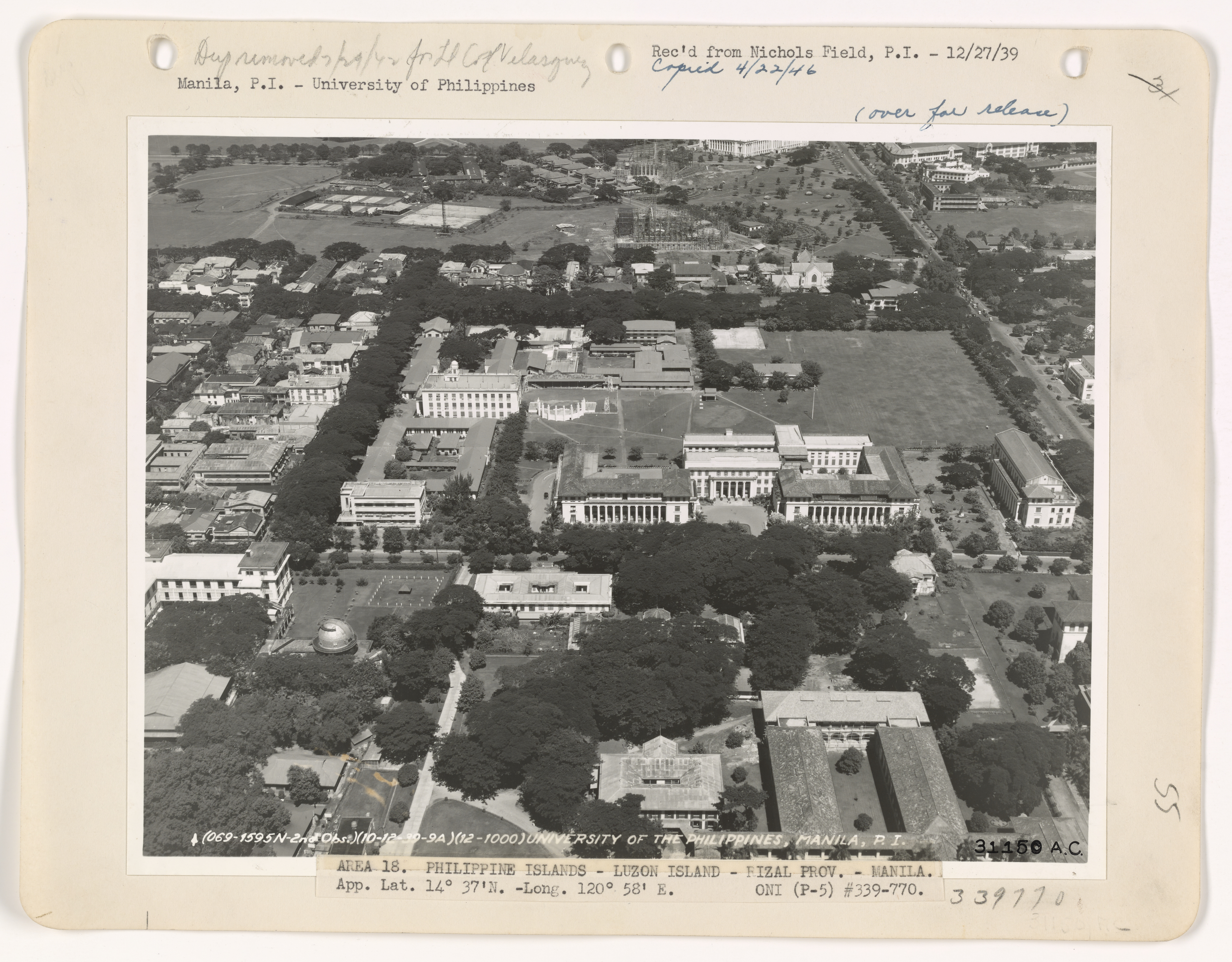
Aerial view of the university, 1939

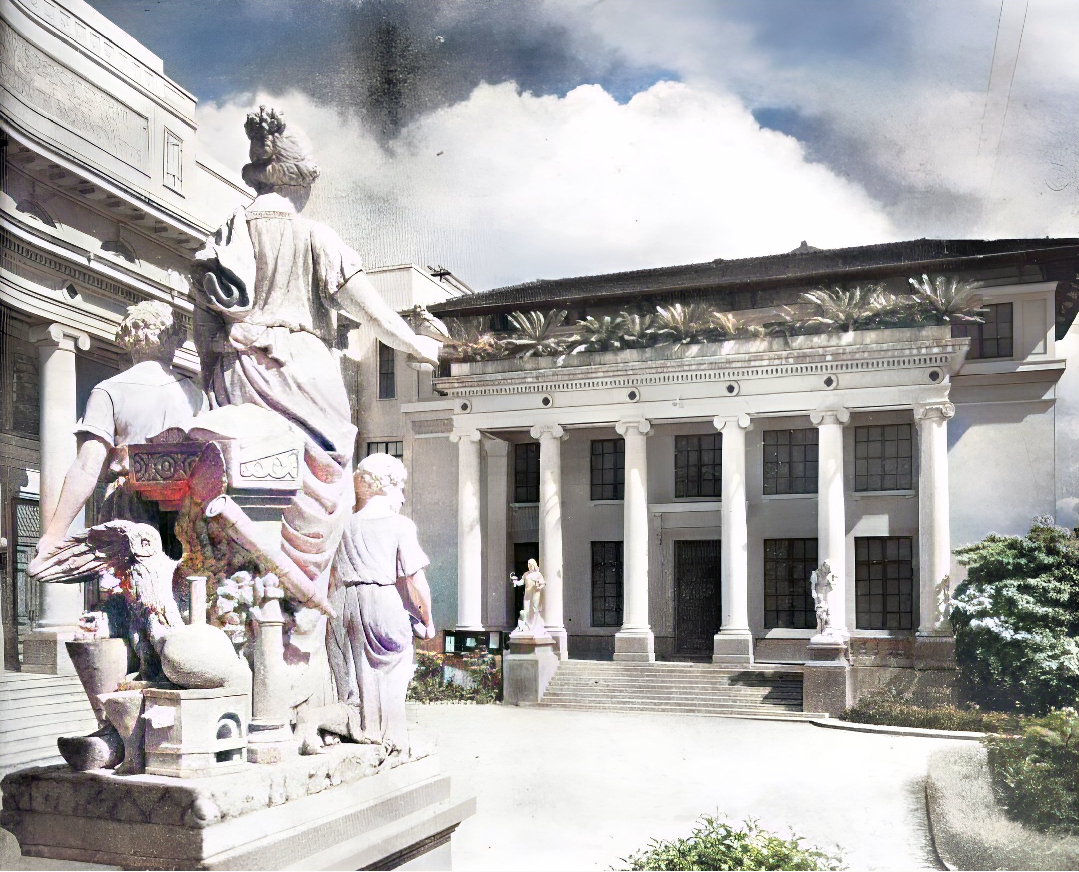
The pre-war Rizal Hall housed the College of Liberal Arts and other UP units in Padre Faura.

On December 1, 1905, the Philippine Medical School was established under Commonwealth Act No. 1415. It opened on June 10, 1907, and was housed at the School for the Deaf and Blind located on Malecon Drive (now Bonifacio Drive). On June 18, 1908, the Philippine Assembly passed the Act No. 1870, also known as the University Charter, marking the birth of the University of the Philippines. The Act renamed the Philippine Medical School as the University of the Philippines College of Medicine and Surgery. The control and management of the medical school was entrusted to the University of the Philippines Board of Regents on December 8, 1910. Its name was shortened to the University of the Philippines College of Medicine on March 1, 1923.

UP opened its doors in 1909 with the School of Fine Arts, the College of Liberal Arts, College of Medicine, College of Veterinary Medicine, College of Engineering and the College of Law. It also operates the UP College of Agriculture in Los Baños, Laguna. These schools and colleges, established on different locations, were transferred to the UP Campus along Pedro Gil Street, Ermita, Manila on July 1, 1910, except for the College of Agriculture.

In 1907, the US government passed a law establishing the Philippine General Hospital (PGH). It was founded by Dean C. Worcester, an American who was a member of the United States Philippine Commission. On September 1, 1910, the 350-bed capacity hospital was opened to the public for health care delivery and clinical instruction and training of medical students. Dr. Paul Freer served as its first Medical School Dean until 1912. On February 5, 1915, the Philippine Legislative Act No. 2467 reorganized the Training School for Nurses into the PGH School of Nursing and established it as a department of PGH. A few years later, in 1914, 1915 and 1927, the School of Pharmacy, Department of Dentistry and the School of Public Health were created, respectively, under the UP College of Medicine. These units eventually became full-fledged degree-granting units in 1935, 1948, and 1932, respectively.

=== World War II ===
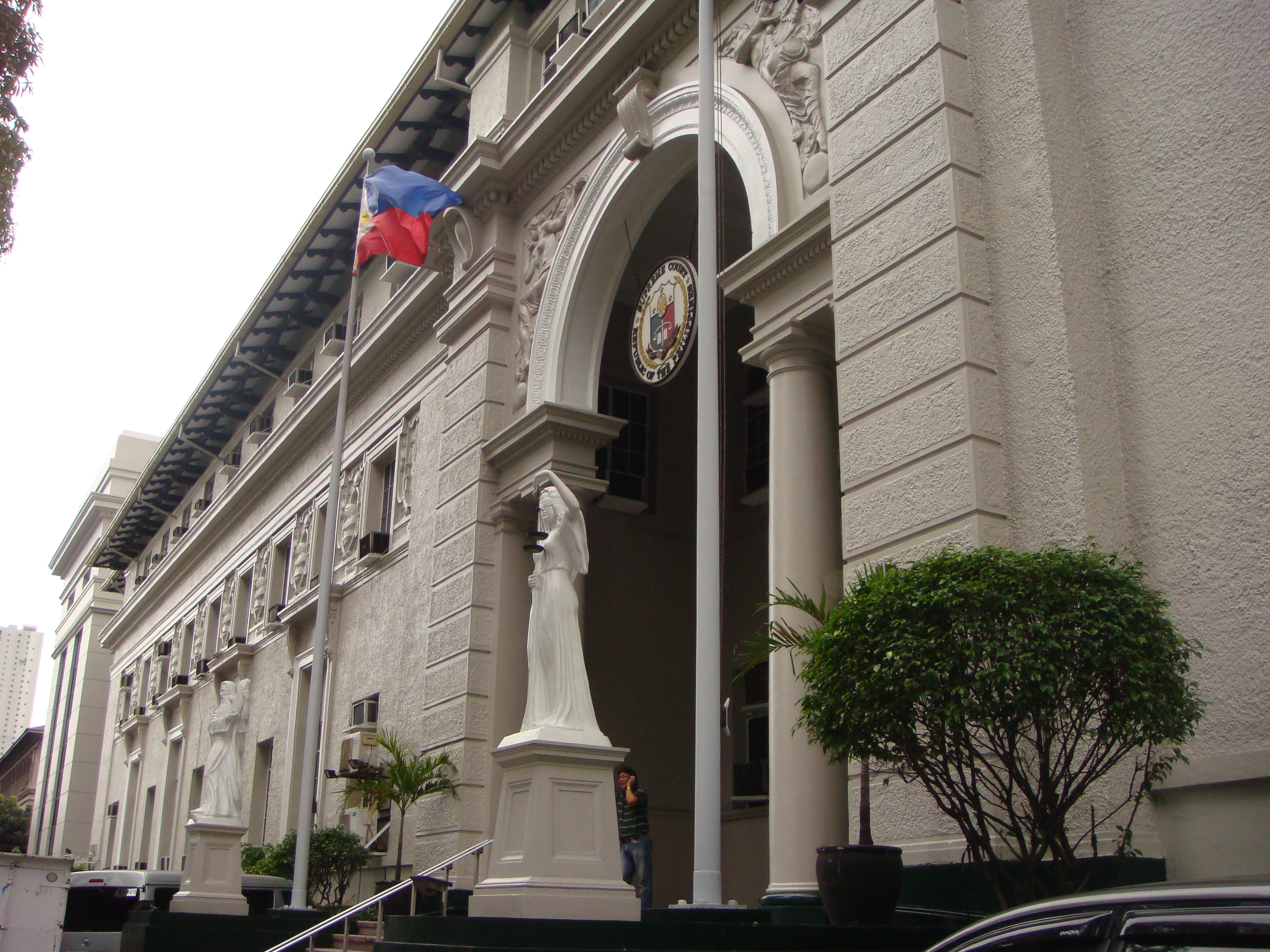
The Old Supreme Court Building was known as the UP Villamor Hall during the American Colonial Period. It formerly housed the Conservatory of Music and School of Fine Arts.

The university was destroyed during the Battle of Manila in 1945. However, the College of Medicine under then Dean, Dr. Antonio G. Sison, and PGH were still able to fulfill their mandate of attending to the injured and the sick. On December 15, 1948, much the university transferred to its sprawling 493 hectare campus in Diliman, Quezon City. Three units, Medicine, Dentistry and Public Health, were left behind in the war-torn UP Campus in Manila. On the 40th anniversary of the University of the Philippines in 1949, the original Oblation was transferred to UP's Diliman Campus in Quezon City from its original site along Padre Faura Street in Manila as a symbol of transfer of administrative seat. In April 1948, the UP College of Nursing, which established in the Diliman Campus, instituted the first baccalaureate program in Nursing in the Philippines. More academic units were established in the 1960s. These included the School of Allied Medical Professions (1962), housed then at the National Orthopedic Hospital (now called the Philippine Orthopedic Center), and the Philippine Eye Research Institute in 1965.

=== Health Sciences Center ===
With the clamor to meet the health science education needs of the growing population, a Health Sciences Center within the University of the Philippines was created through the passage of RA 5163 on June 17, 1967. It was mandated to seek and emphasize the highest standards of training and research in the various health sciences. However, the Center at the Diliman Campus did not materialize due to fiscal constraints.

In 1972, the UP College Manila was instituted as the first extension unit to offer liberal arts courses. Thereafter, UP was reorganized into the University of the Philippines System to effect institutional unity, while allowing decentralization of authority and autonomy of the component units through Presidential Decree No. 58, promulgated on November 20, 1972, under the administration of President Ferdinand E. Marcos. It was approved by the Board of Regents at its 828th meeting on November 21, 1972, and was implemented on January 1, 1973.

=== Contemporary history ===
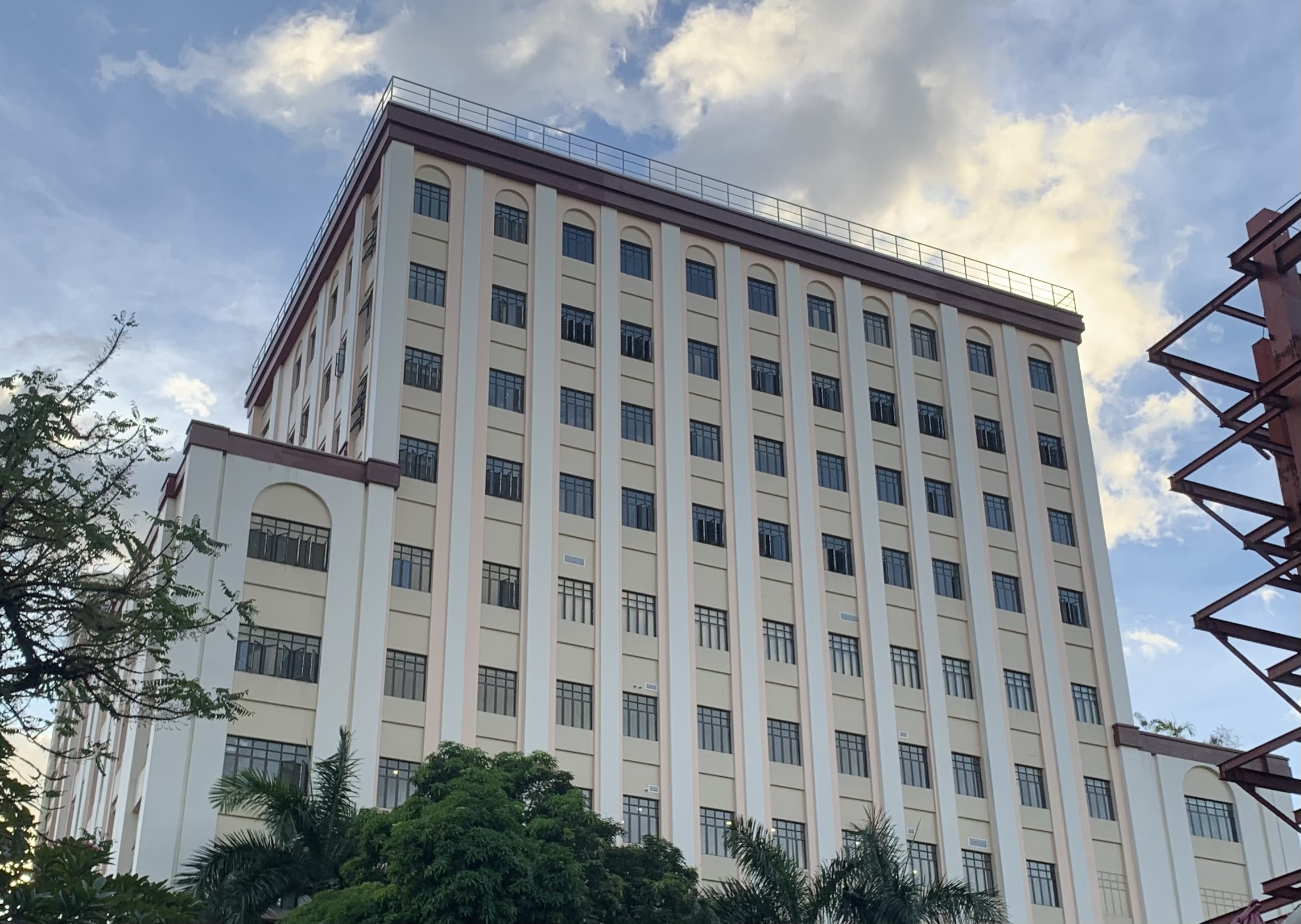
To accommodate more students and functions, UPM is constructing high-rise buildings. The new Medical Sciences Building of the College of Medicine was finished in 2022.

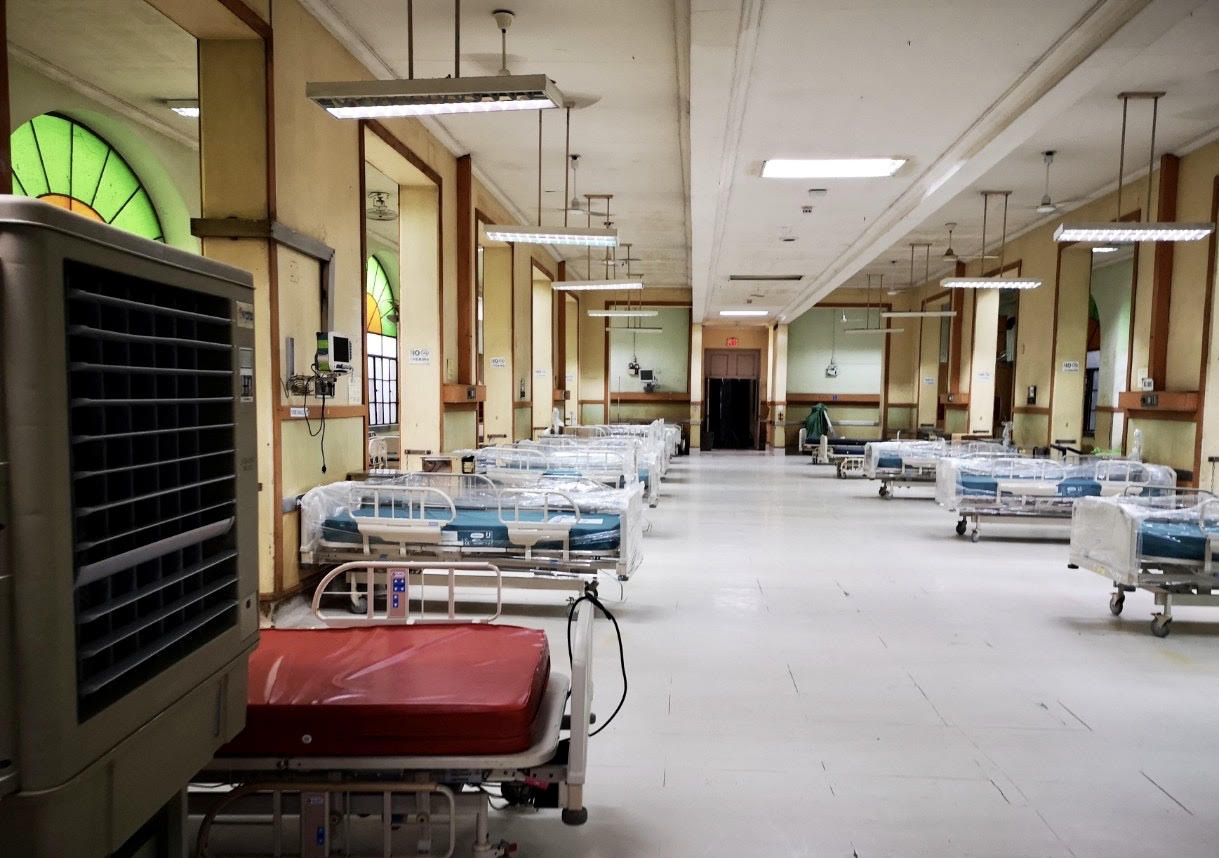
PGH converted several wards in the Main Block Building to accommodate COVID-19 cases.

Since 2001, the College of Medicine and the College of Nursing are recognized as Centers of Excellence by the Commission on Higher Education. In addition, the College of Nursing is a WHO Collaborating Center for Leadership in Nursing Development in the Asia-Pacific region. The Southeast Asian Ministers of Education Organization named the College of Public Health as the SEAMEO-TROPMED Regional Center for Public Health, Hospital Administration, and Environmental and Occupational Health. The National Teacher Training Center for the Health Professions is a WHO Regional Education Development Center for Health Professions Education.

The centennial celebration of the University of the Philippines began on January 8, 2008. As part of UP's centenary, an Oblation statue in front of the Philippine General Hospital was unveiled in December 2008.

In 2013, UP Manila was badly criticized when Kristel Tejada, a 16-year-old behavioral sciences student, committed suicide because she couldn't pay for her tuition fee for the second semester and was left with no choice but to drop out of school. The Tejada family also has to pay the loan Kristel had taken for her first semester tuition. This event led to numerous student protests nationwide, mostly coming from the state universities and colleges, and the students from the UP System. The university was later pressured to lift its "no-late-payment" policy on tuition.

During the COVID-19 pandemic, UP Manila became fundamental to the country's primary healthcare response. In March 2020, the UPM National Institutes of Health was designated COVID testing center and started COVID testing through its locally produced SARS CoV-2 PCR Detection Kit. Later that month, the Department of Health assigned the Philippine General Hospital as COVID-19 referral center for Metro Manila. To make room for COVID patient wards, PGH temporarily suspended outpatient and elective surgery services and offered teleconsultations instead. The hospital, which already lacked spaces for patients, suffered patient overcrowding while it remained understaffed. Through the years, PGH workers also protested against low salaries, job contracting, delayed hazard pay and COVID-19 benefits, insufficient equipment, and budget cuts.

To address the lack of funding and equipment, several UPM units developed different COVID-19 technologies, including the GenAmplify™ COVID-19 rRT-PCR Detection Kit; OstreaVent II; Mechanical Ambu Bag Insufflator; Ginhawa Ventilator; SIBOL innovations such as the RxBox-Telemetry, SIBOL Telepresence, Powered Air-Purifying Respirator, SaniPod, E-Steth Project, and Ultraviolet Irradiation Cabinet; UP Manila Bayanihan Na! Employee Symptoms Tracking System (BESTS); and PGH Bayanihan Center Current Inventory Levels and Donations Tracker. In March 2021, the first official COVID-19 vaccine in the Philippines was administered at PGH to its director, Dr. Gerardo Legaspi.

UPM is the only Philippine university that entered the global Top 500 of the U.S. News & World Report 2026-2027 Best Global Universities.

== Campus ==
University of the Philippines Manila campus map as of September 2024
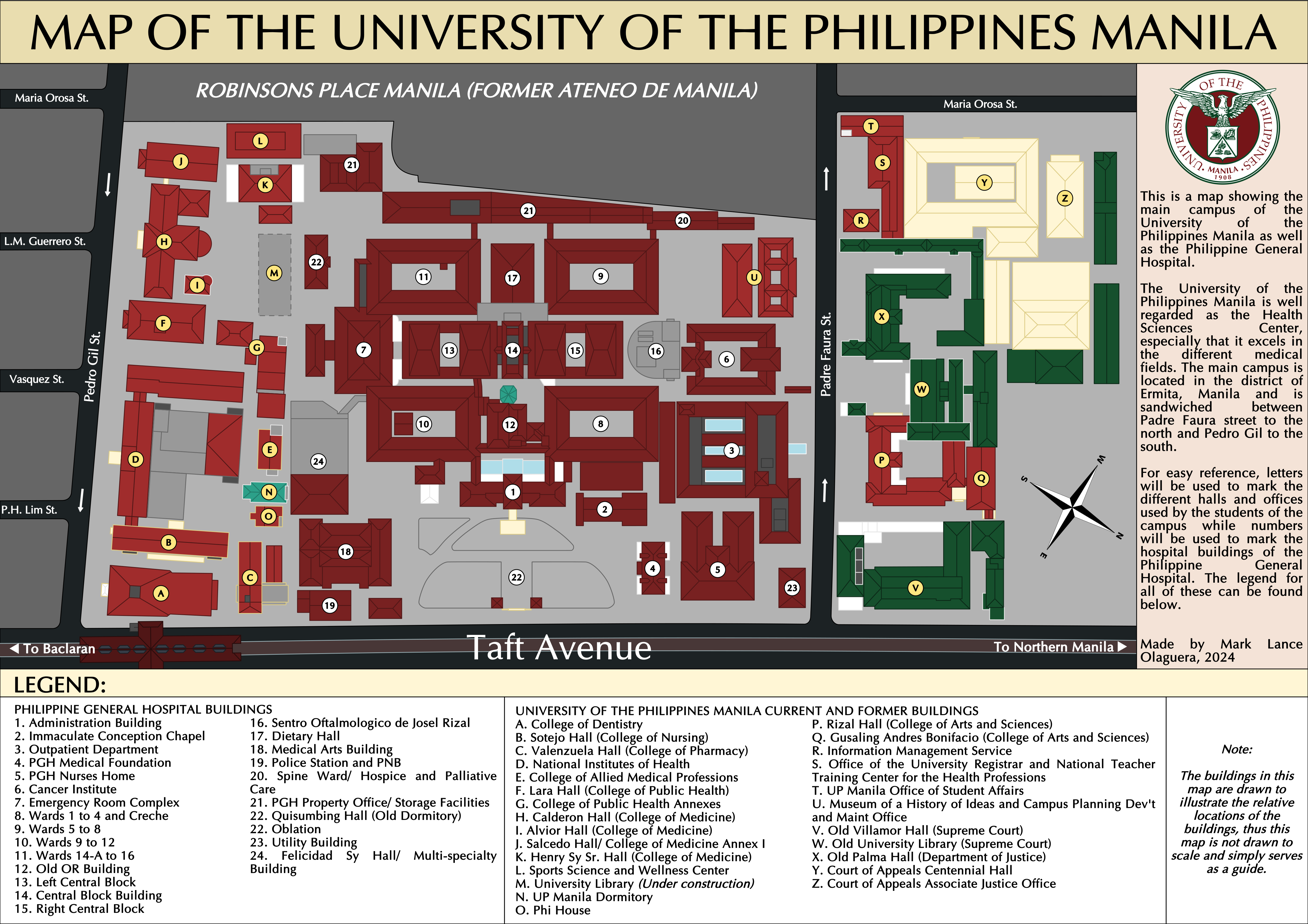

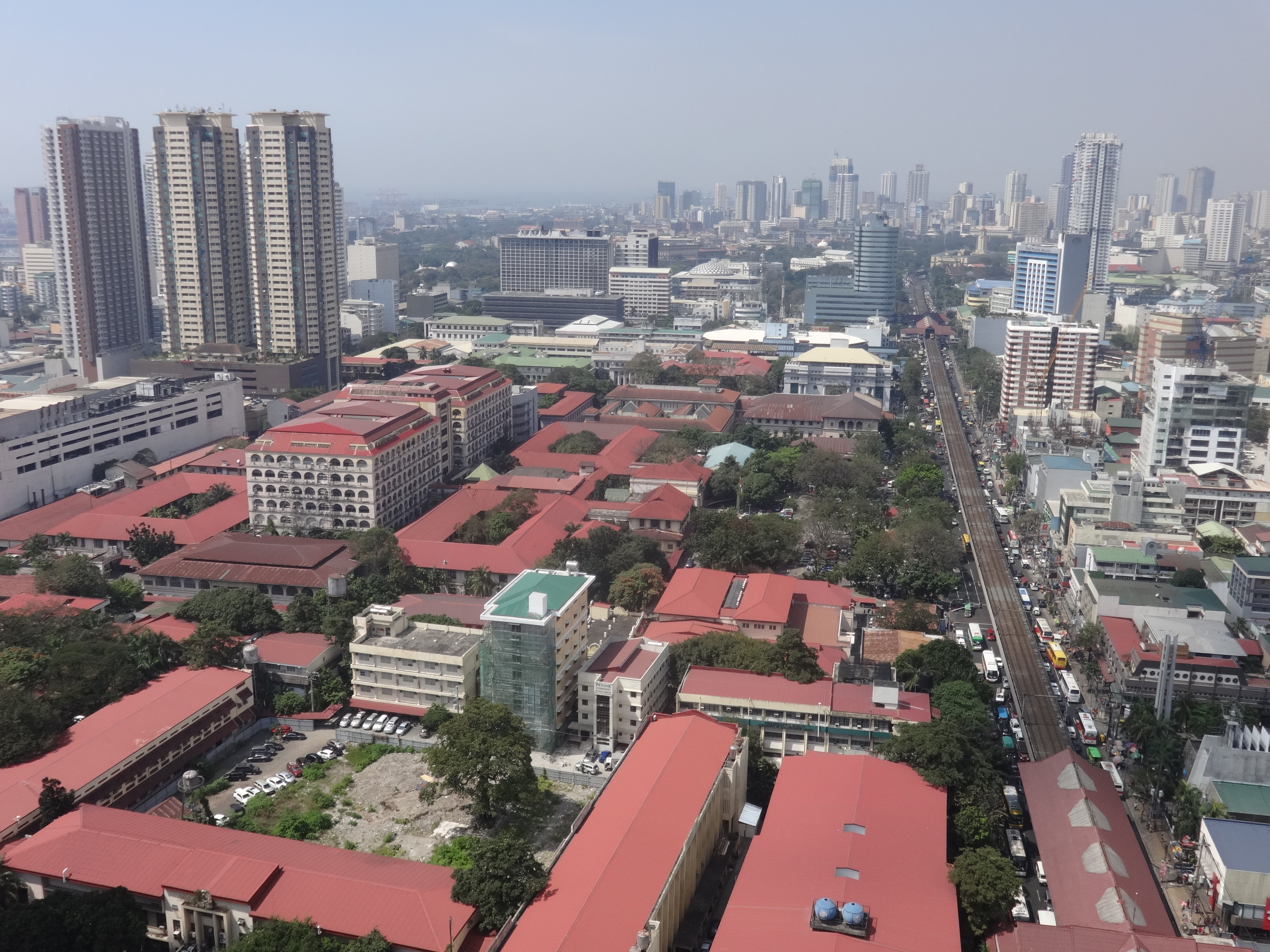
Aerial view of the campus.

The University of the Philippines Manila is situated in the bustling area of Ermita, Manila. Its 14 ha (35 acres) campus of which 10 ha is reserved for the Philippine General Hospital and the National Institutes of Health. It is the second largest university campus in the City of Manila after the 22 ha (54 acres) University of Santo Tomas. The campus is bounded by United Nations Avenue to the north, Taft Avenue to the east, María Orosa Avenue and Robinsons Place Manila to the west and by Pedro Gil Street to the south. The university is served by the United Nations and Pedro Gil Station of the LRT Line 1.

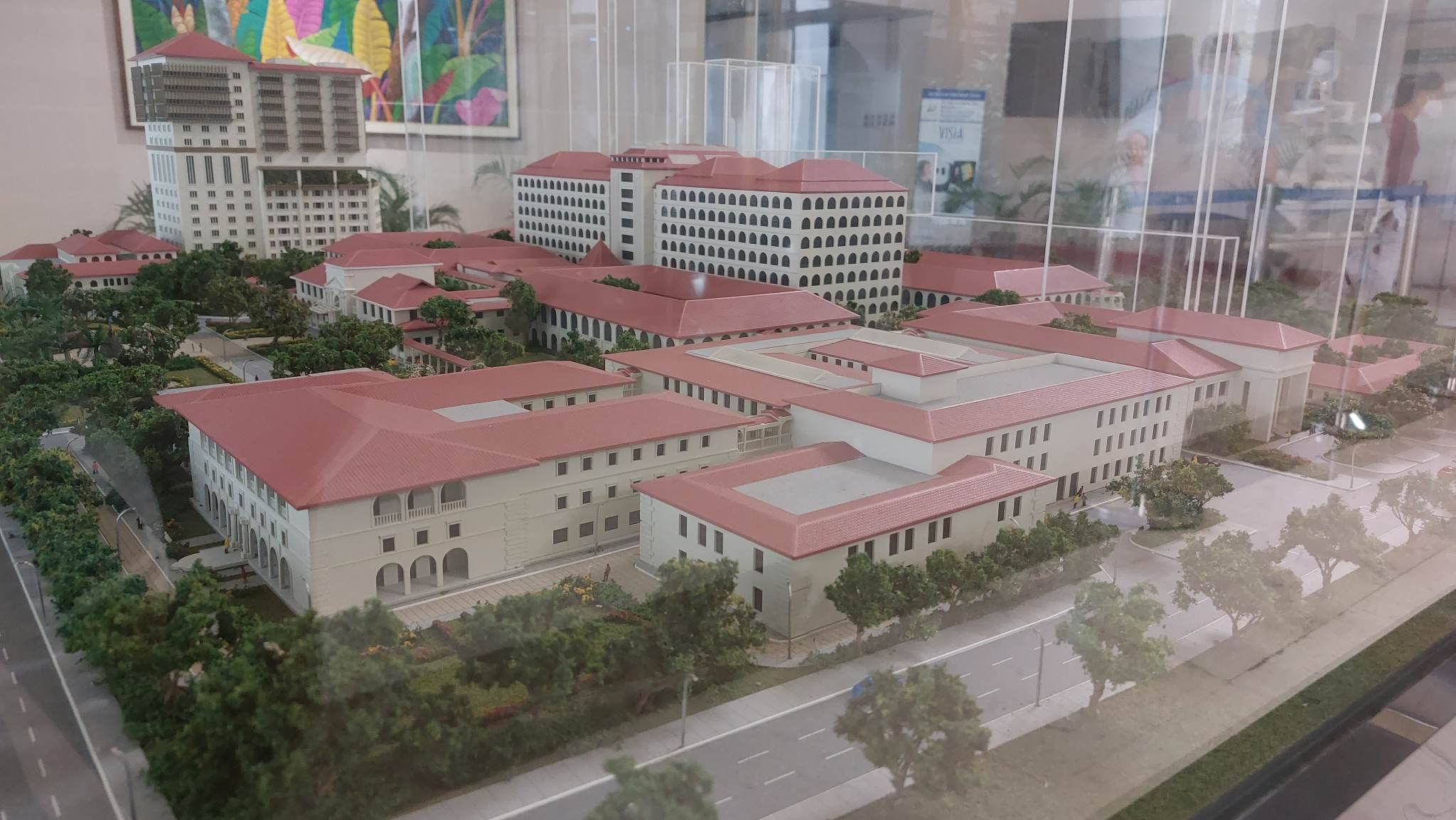
A diorama of UPM and PGH featuring current, under construction, and proposed buildings. Some buildings such as Rizal hall and the Office of the University Registrar are not included in the diorama.

UP Manila buildings vary in age from the American era buildings built in early 1900s to high rise facilities in 2020s. Most of UPM's buildings are designed in Neoclassical style, a theme which has been preserved in recent architectural additions. Many buildings in the campus were designed by American Architect William E. Parsons, in accordance with the Burnham Plan of Manila. The Calderon Hall of the College of Medicine and the Administration Building of the Philippine General Hospital were the first buildings constructed on the campus site. PGH became the template for many tropical hospitals in Asia and tropical America. This was followed by the construction of the University Hall (now Department of Justice) and Rizal Hall in the Padre Faura Street, both used by most UP colleges and executive offices before the World War II. In 2013, the National Historical Commission of the Philippines (NHCP) declared several sites within the campus as heritage zones and were listed in the National Registry of Historic Sites and Structures in the Philippines.

NHCP-protected buildings and structures including its settings:

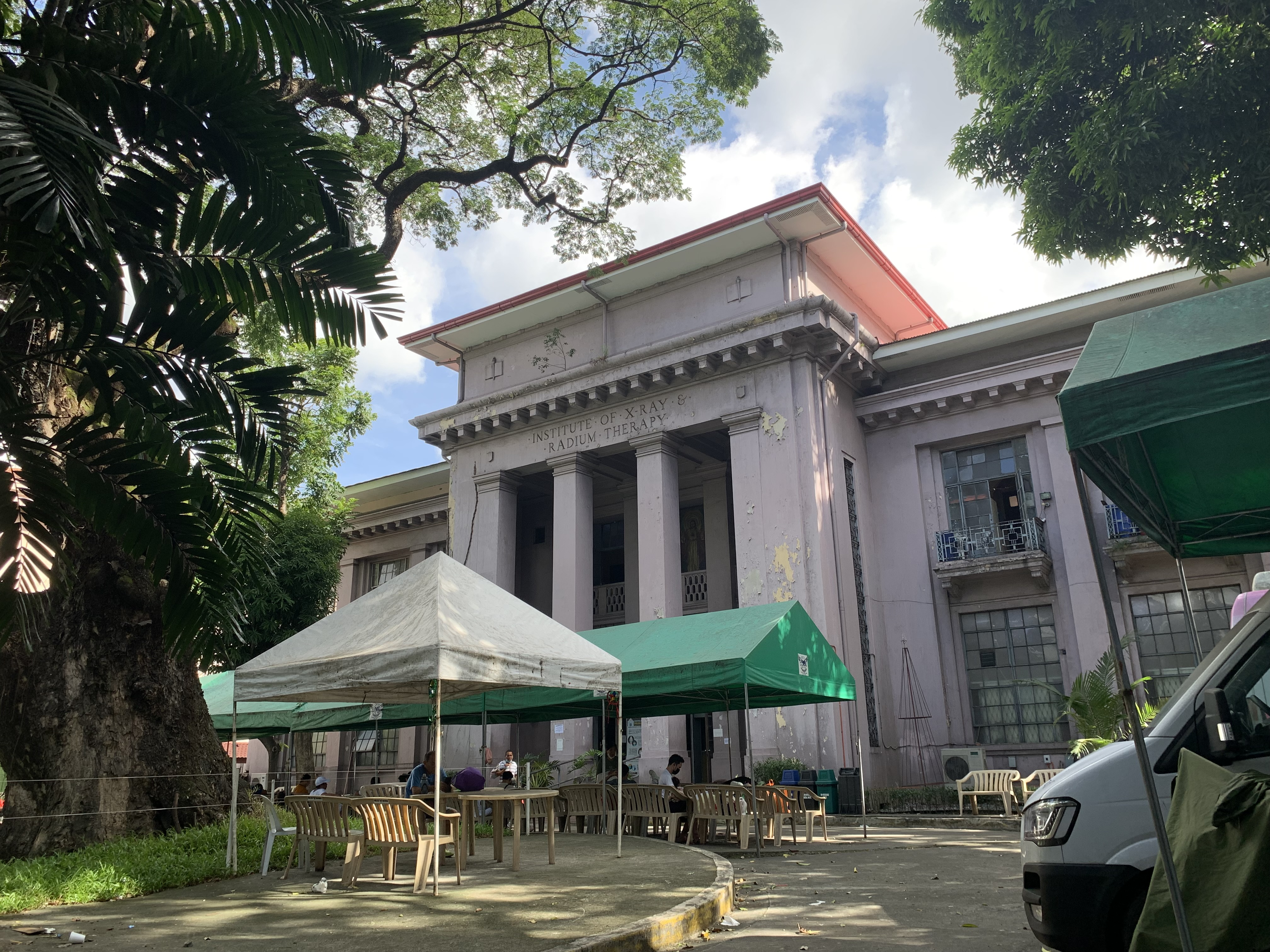
Cancer Institute

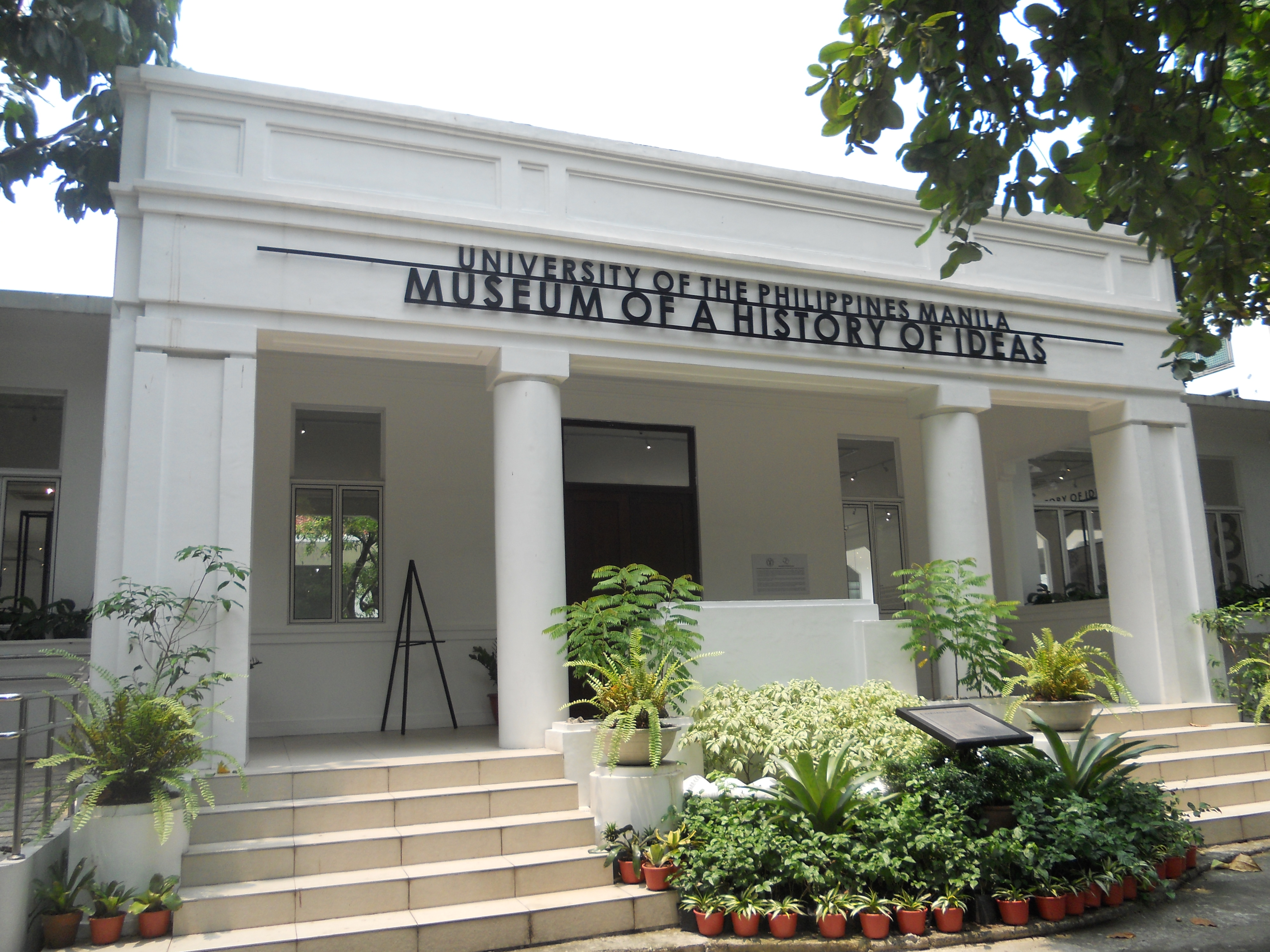
Old Dentistry Building

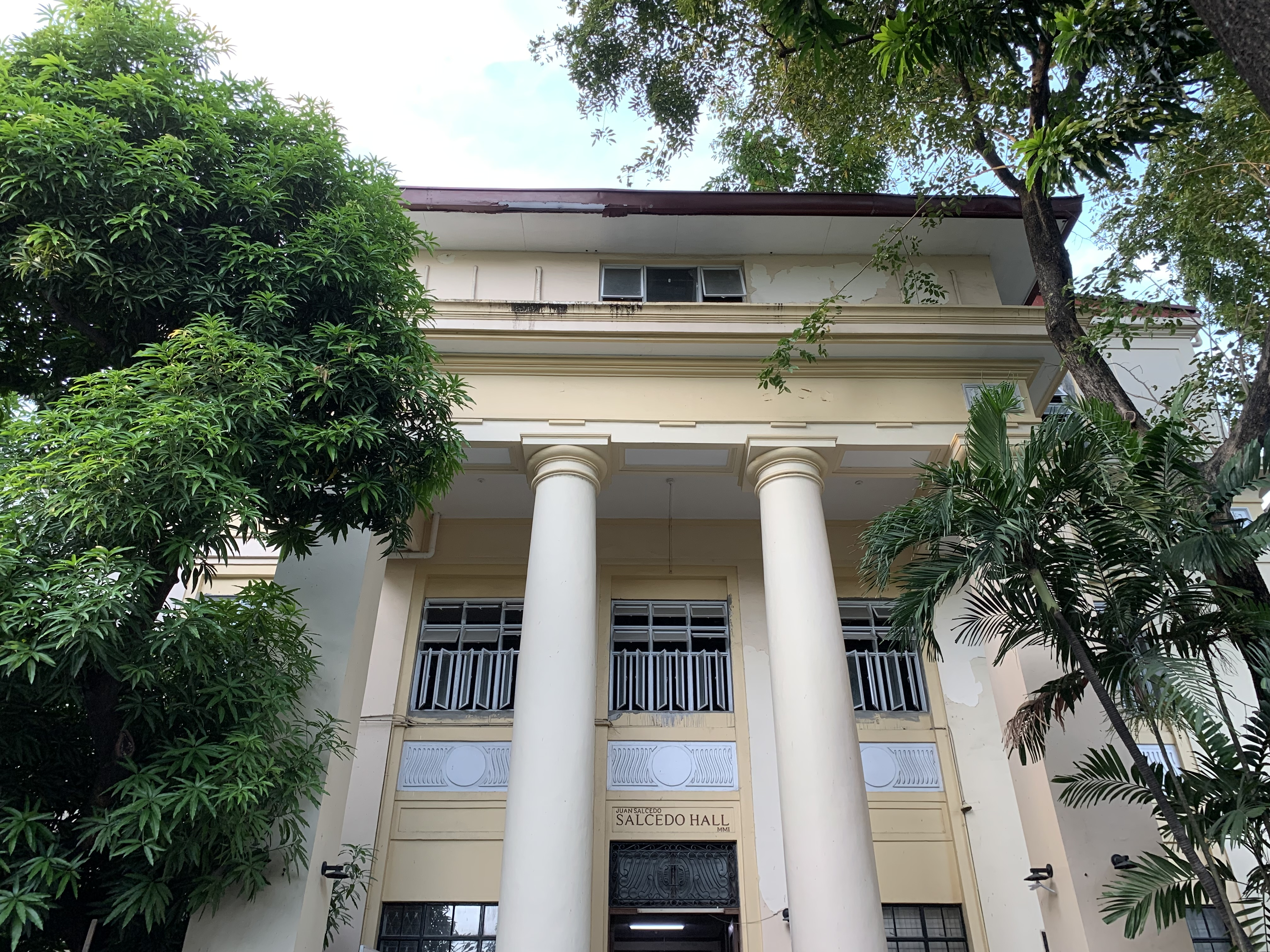
Juan Salcedo Hall

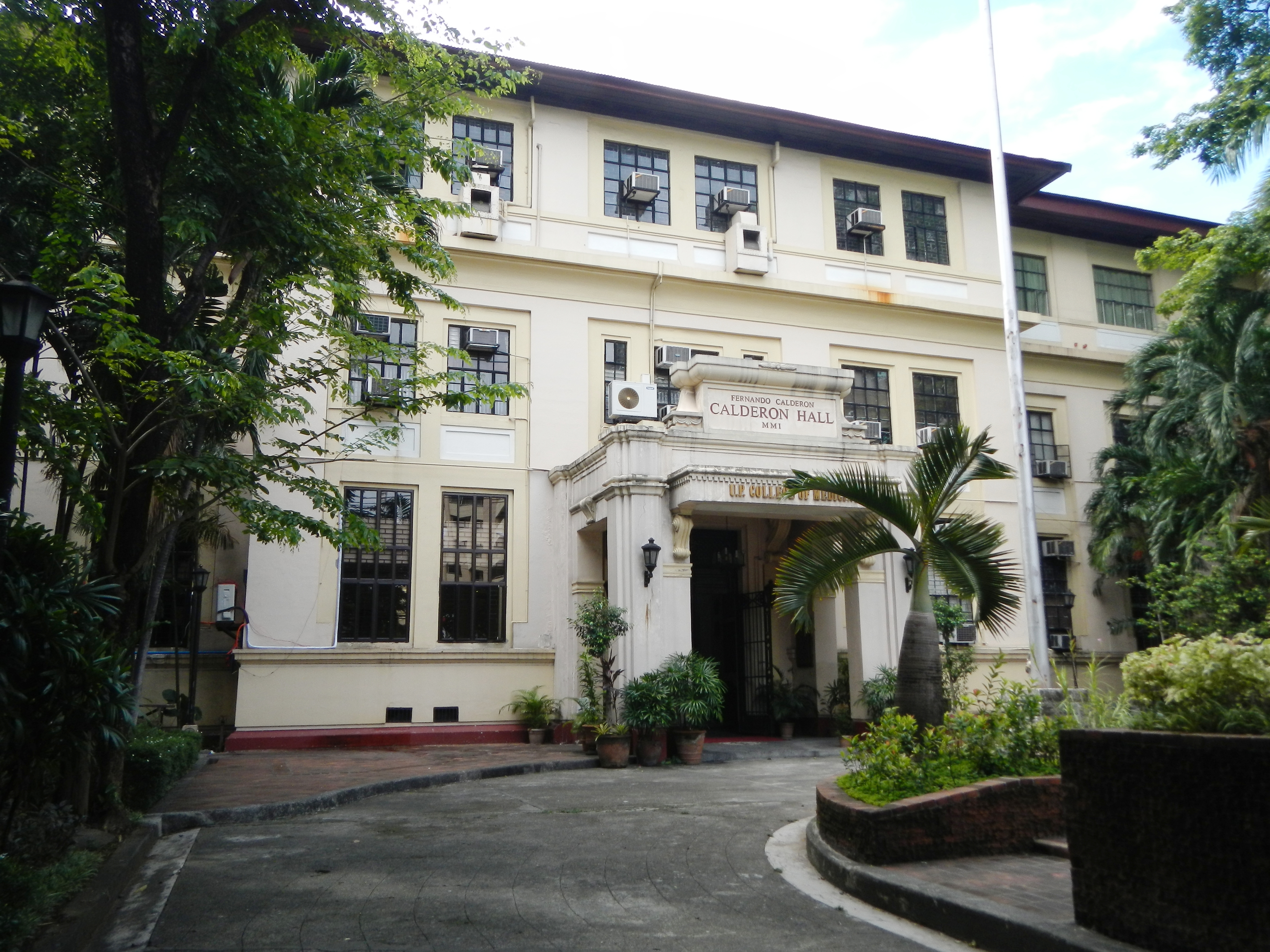
Fernando Calderon Hall

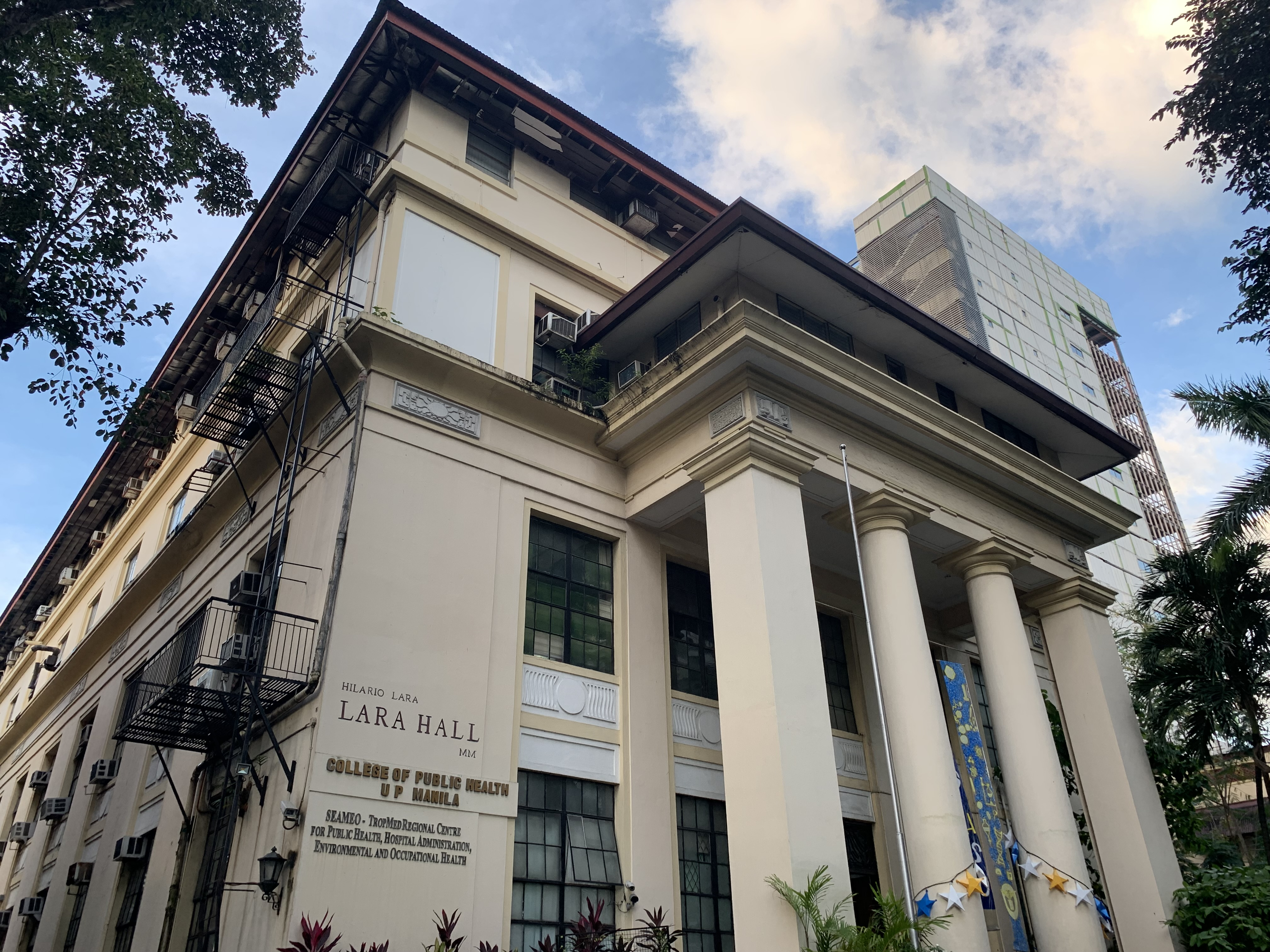
Hilario Lara Hall

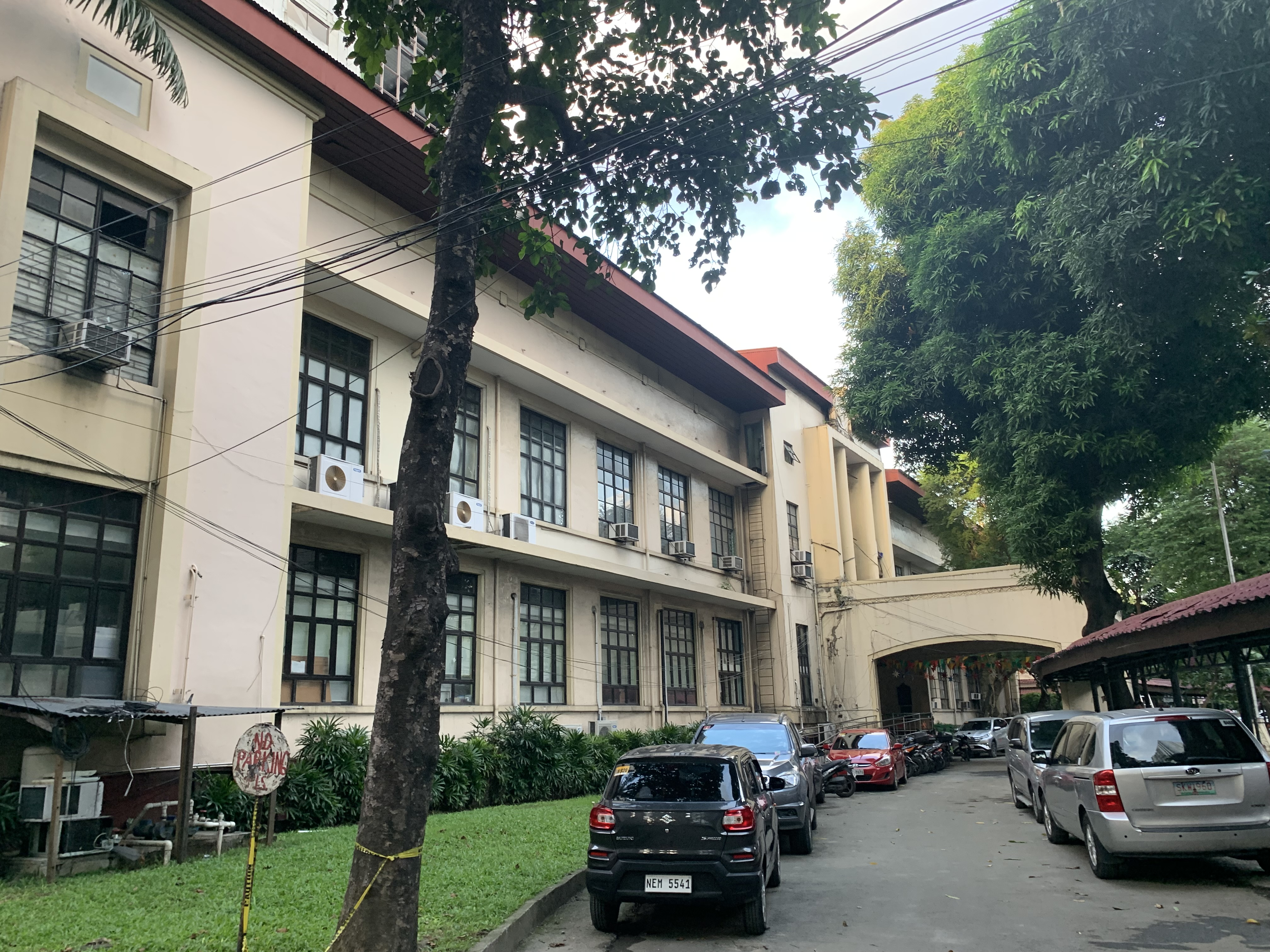
National Institutes of Health

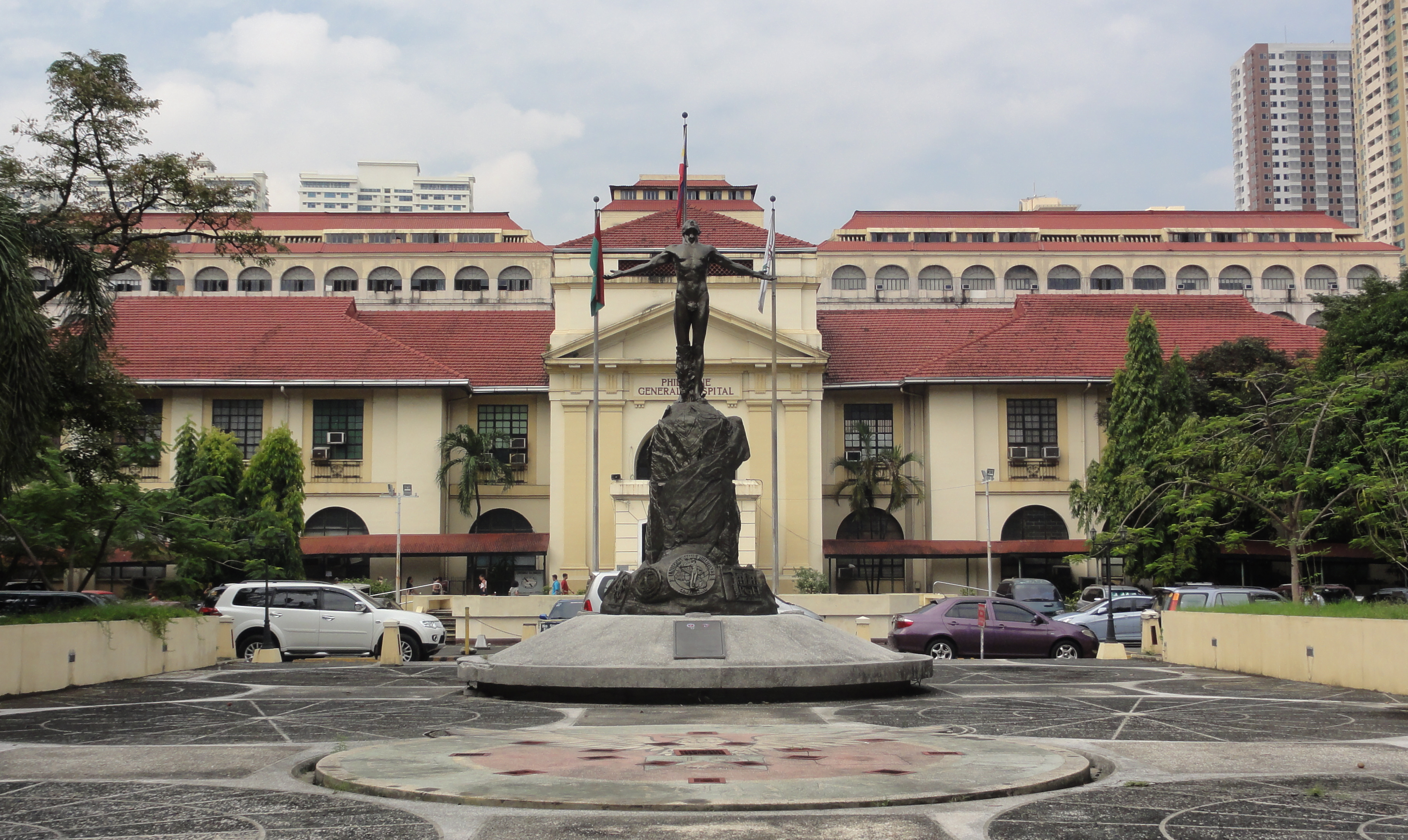
Philippine General Hospital

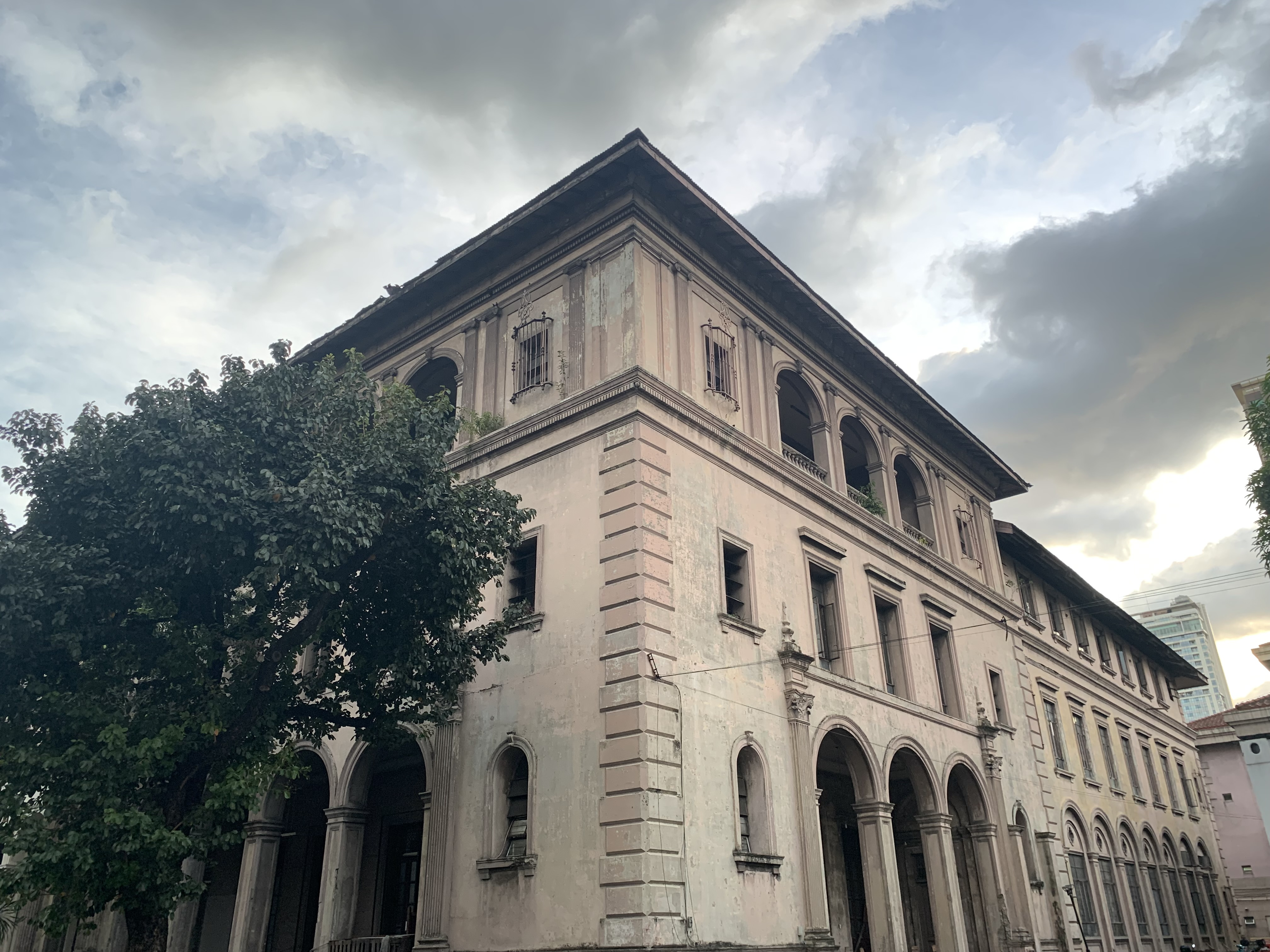
Nurses' Home

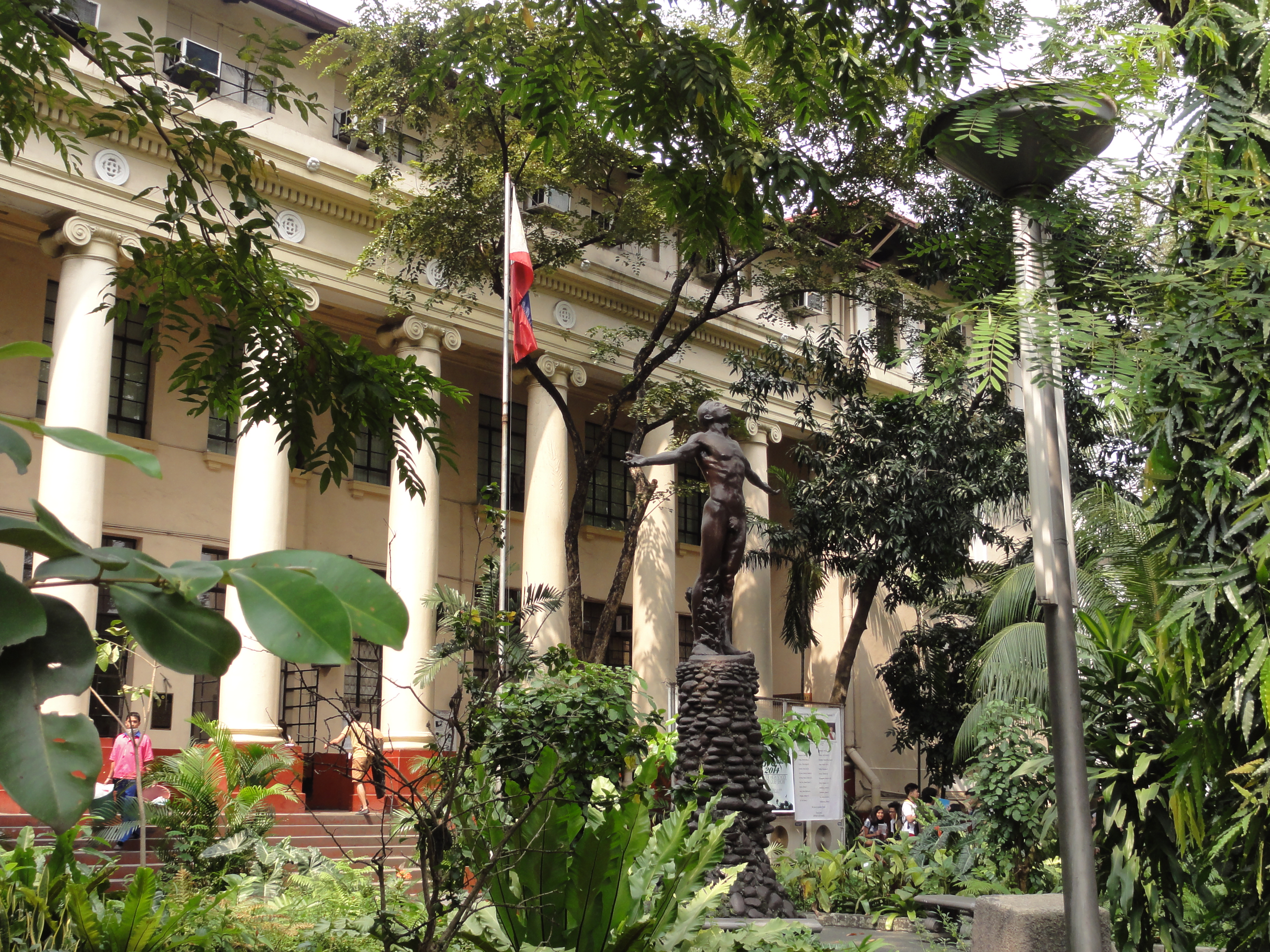
Rizal Hall

The maintenance and planning for campus buildings are provided by the UP Manila Campus Planning, Development and Maintenance Office (CPDMO) It manages the creation of spaces that support and enhance teaching, research, and public service activities of UP Manila. It is also tasked to recover the lots and heritage buildings that belongs to the university which are now occupied by the National Bureau of Investigation, Court of Appeals, Department of Justice, and the Supreme Court of the Philippines. The Supreme Court has announced its plans to vacate its UP Campus site in Manila and move to the Bonifacio Capital District in Taguig with the Court of Appeals upon the completion of their new state-of-the-art building. The Department of Justice is also slated to move to New Clark City. CPDMO is located on the former UP College of Dentistry Annex Building, which was constructed in the 1960s.

=== Academic facilities and satellite campuses ===
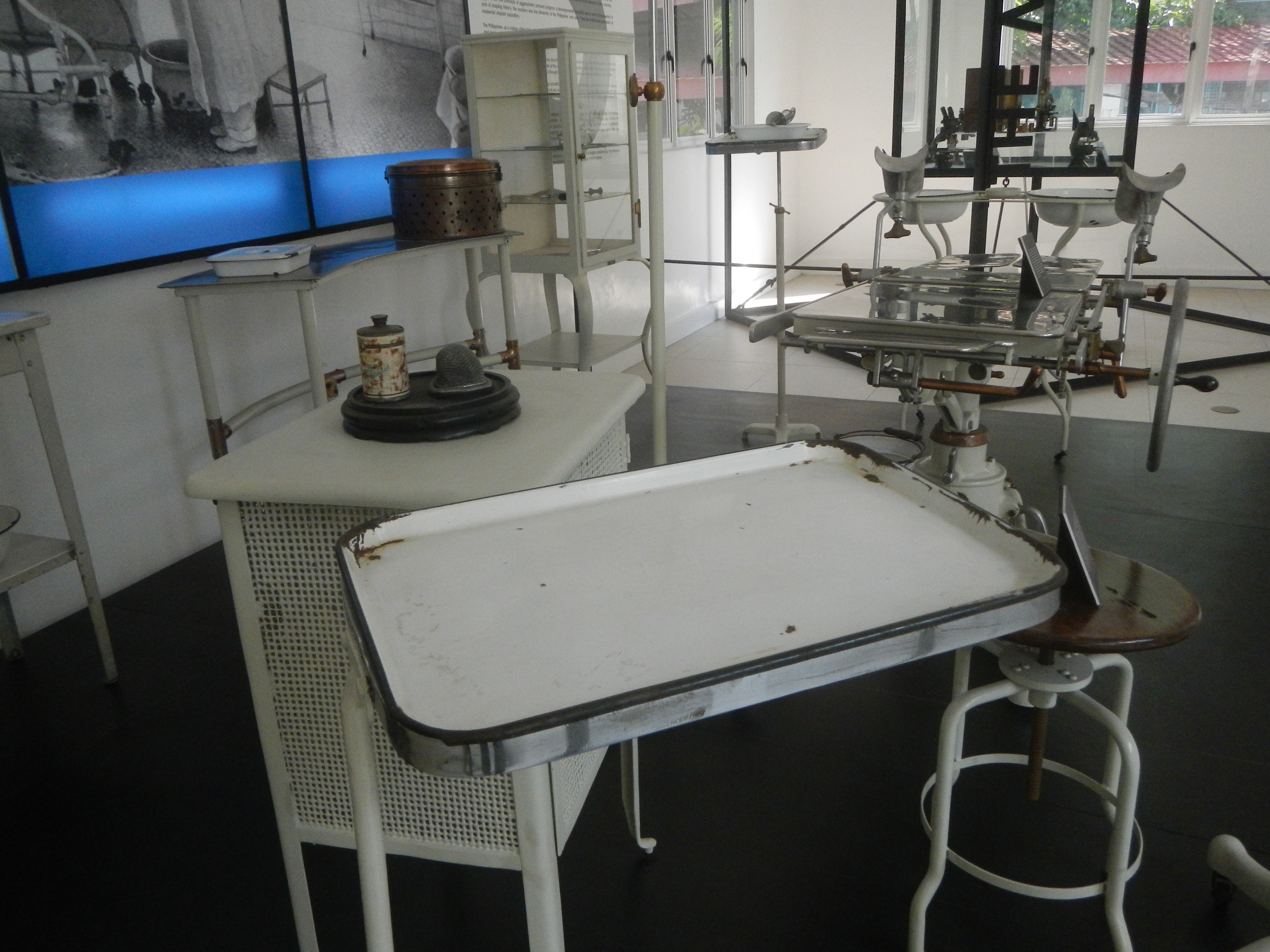
Old PGH medical equipment are exhibited in the UP Manila Museum of a History of Ideas.

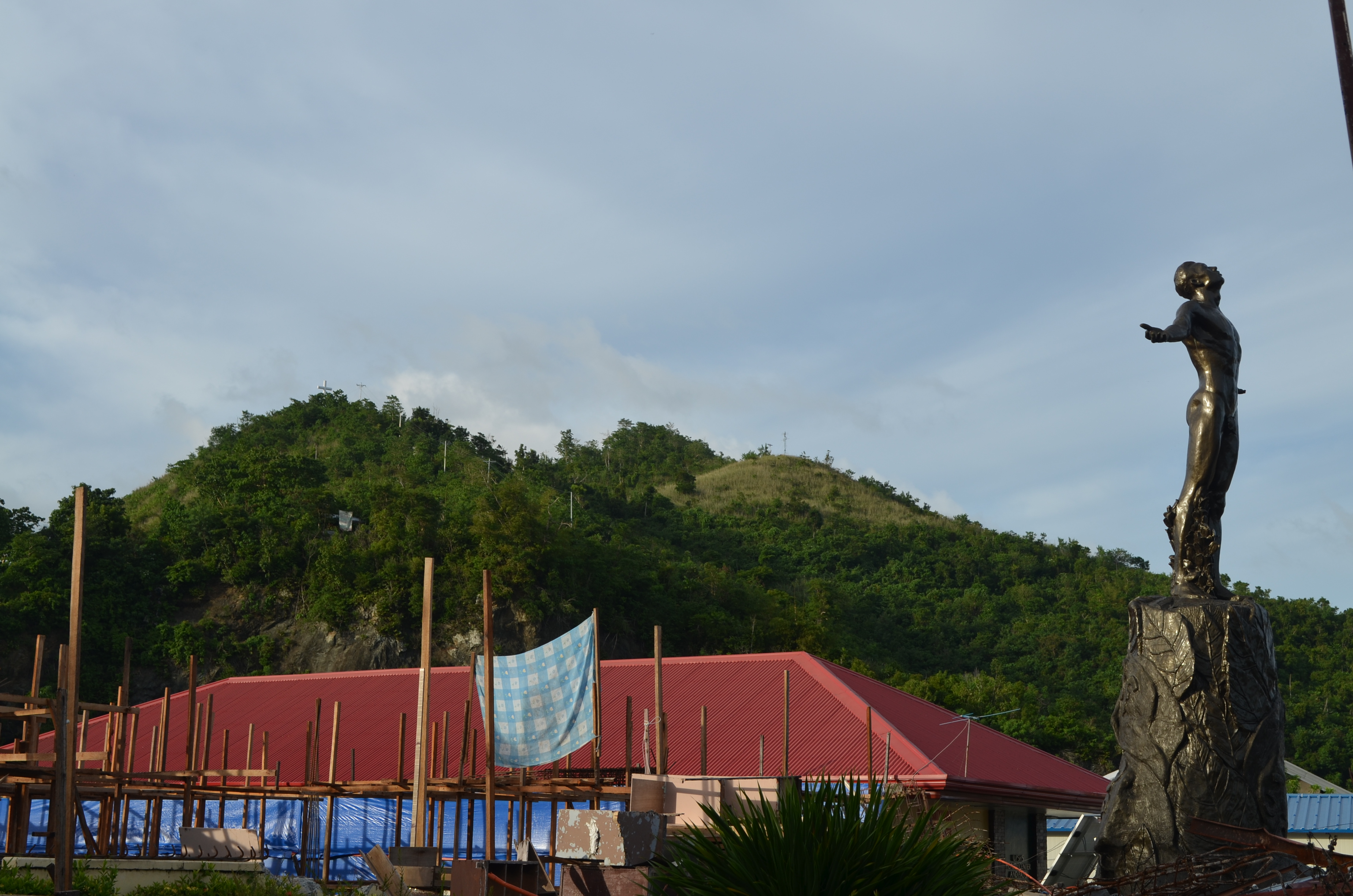
The UPM School of Health Sciences main campus in Palo, Leyte.

The UP Manila University Library and its nine college-based units compose the campus's library network, and as of October 2000 the library has a total collection of 189,874 volumes, including videos, sound recordings, and photographs. Since 1995, the University Library was a member of the Department of Science and Technology – Engineering, Science and Education Library Network Project. The UP College Medicine Library, officially as the Dr. Florentino B. Herrera, Jr. Medical Library, is a center for the study of medical and clinical sciences, and its collections are particularly strong in the subjects of basic and clinical biomedical subjects. It occupies the building adjacent to the University Library. Both library buildings were permanently closed in 2016, after they were endangered when the foundation of the nearby under-construction UP College of Medicine Academic Center sank.

On October 22, 2014, the university inaugurated the UP Manila Museum of a History of Ideas. The museum showcases the contributions of the University of the Philippines to the critical imagination that shaped the Philippines as a nation in the early 20th century. It was opened to the public on December 2, 2014.

The Philippine General Hospital has also several planned expansions beyond its Manila headquarters. In 2019, a PGH polyclinic named the Philippine General Hospital Satellite for Sports Medicine and Wellness (PGH-SSMW) was opened to serve the 2019 Southeast Asian Games. It will be eventually expanded into a full hospital to serve the New Clark City, alongside future branches of the College of Medicine and the National Institutes of Health in the upcoming UP campus in the area. The university also aims to build PGH branches in Los Baños and Diliman to build a hospital network to service UP constituents. However, the construction of PGH Diliman is facing scrutiny due to its impact to a protected forest area and its prioritization over upgrade of the current Manila facility.

== Academics ==
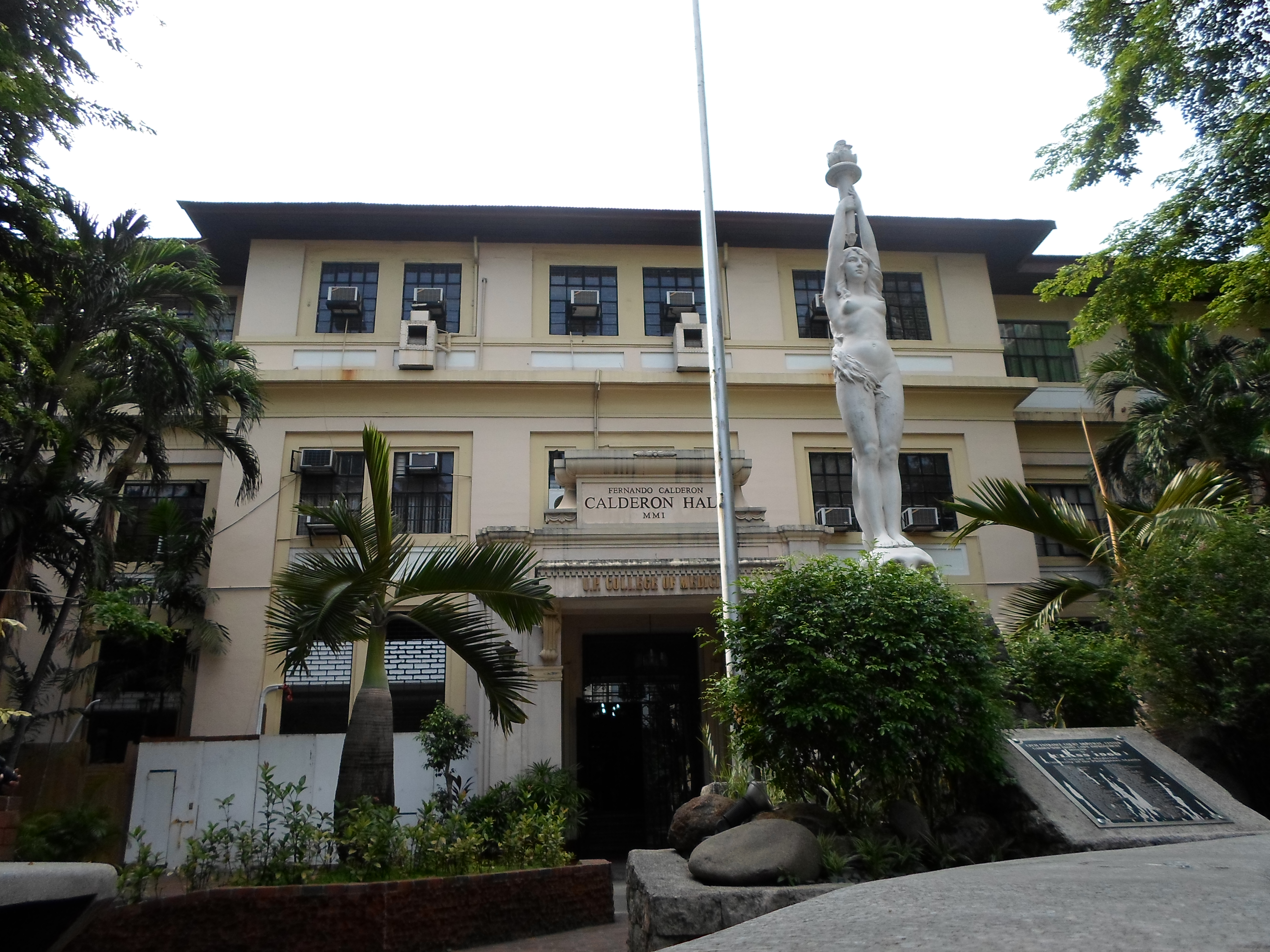
Calderon Hall, the home of the UP College of Medicine. The college is the first Center of Excellence for Medicine in the country.

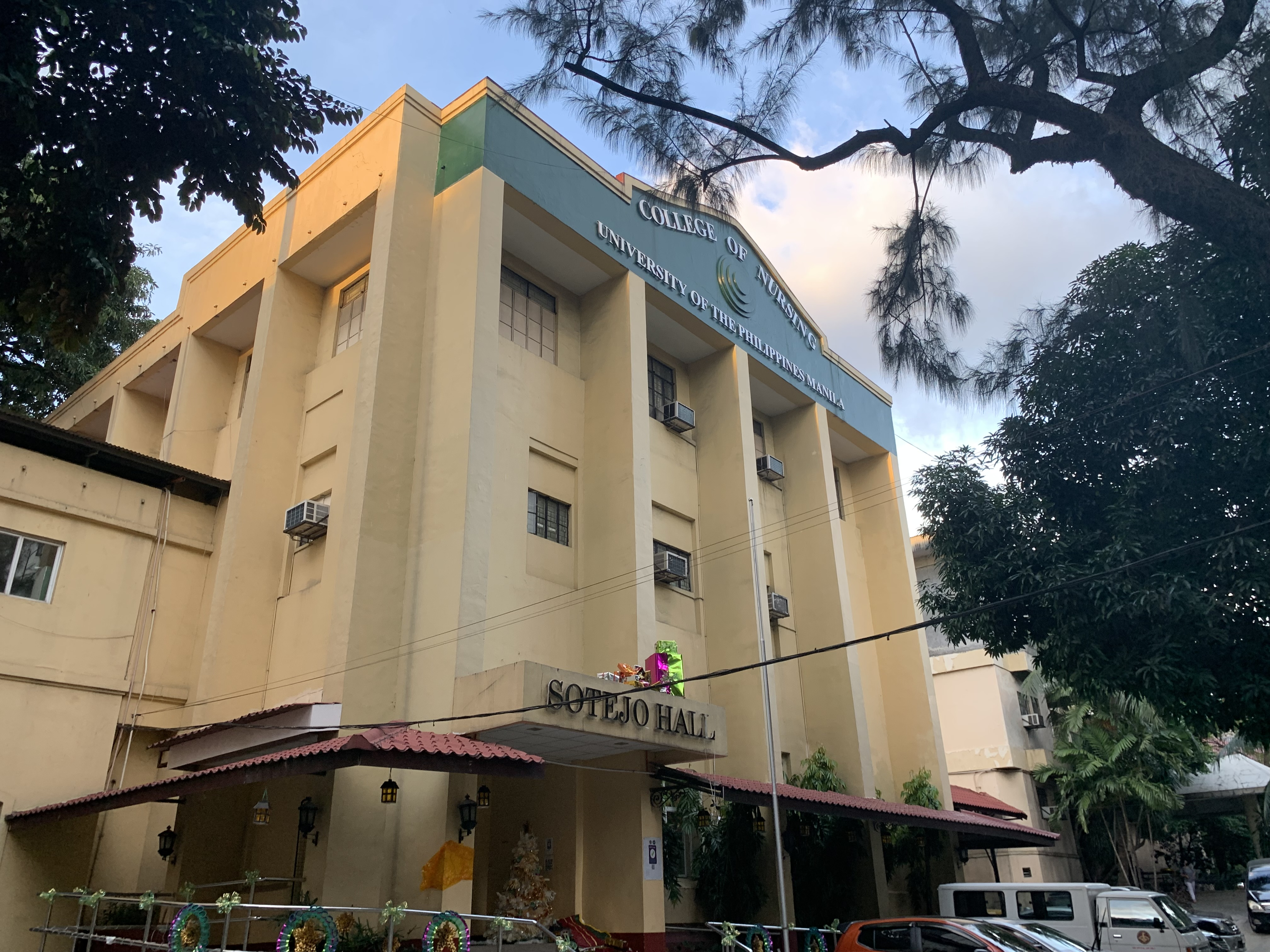
Sotejo Hall, home of the College of Nursing. The college is a World Health Organization Collaborating Center for Leadership in Nursing Development.

UP Manila offers 79 health-related undergraduate and graduate programs in nine degree-granting units. The university's academic units are broadly organized into seven colleges, the National Teacher Training Center for Health Professions, and the School of Health Sciences. The Philippine General Hospital and National Institutes of Health also form part of the university as training and research centers. As the leading institution for medical education and research, UP Manila is regarded as the National Health Sciences Center of the Philippines and designated as one of the four pillars of the Metro Manila Health Research and Development Consortium.

The university has multiple programs which were the first of their kind in the Philippines, such as the seven-year Integrated Arts and Medicine (INTARMED) Program, MS in Medical Informatics, MS in bioethics, Master of Rehabilitation Science, MS in Clinical Audiology, and MA in Health Policy Studies. The university also offered the first baccalaureate programs in nursing, organizational communication, and public health in the Philippines. Moreover, the UPM School of Health Sciences offers the first stepladder health sciences curriculum in Asia that allows students to take integrated courses on community health work, midwifery, nursing, and community medicine towards a Doctor of Medicine degree.

The College of Medicine and the College of Nursing has been recognized by the Commission on Higher Education as National Centers of Excellence since 2001. In addition, the World Health Organization has designated the College of Nursing as WHO Collaborating Center for Leadership in Nursing Development and the National Teacher Training Center for the Health Professions as WHO Regional Development Center in Health Professions Education in the Western Pacific Region. The College of Public Health also hosts the SEAMEO-Tropmed Regional Centre for Public Health, Hospital Administration, Environmental and Occupational Health.

=== Admissions ===
Admission to the university is very selective. Prospective undergraduate students must pass the University of the Philippines College Admission Test (UPCAT), which is part of the admission requirements for all the component units of the University of the Philippines System.

An applicant for the Doctor of Medicine program can enter through direct entry at Learning Unit 1, where only high school graduates from the top male and female UPCAT scorers are accepted, or lateral entry at Learning Unit 3, where college graduates who passed the National Medical Admission Test (NMAT) are accepted. On the other hand, the School of Health Sciences directly admits scholars nominated by the far-flung communities served by its campuses.

=== Financial aid ===
The university spends most of its budget to the students. For the school year of 2017 to 2018, UP Manila offers tuition-free education to its medical students through a cash grants program. It was funded through the ₱317.1 million allocation for eight selected state universities and colleges nationwide which offers medical programs, with each institution receiving an allotment of ₱39 million. Students who will benefit from this program are expected to render a one-year "return service" to the Philippines for every cash grants he or she receives. The program, although separate in nature, is still a part of the ₱8.3 billion free tuition program for undergraduate students in all state universities and colleges nationwide, or the Universal Access to Quality Tertiary Education Act, which prompted the university to stop collecting tuition fees to all undergraduate students indefinitely.

=== Research ===
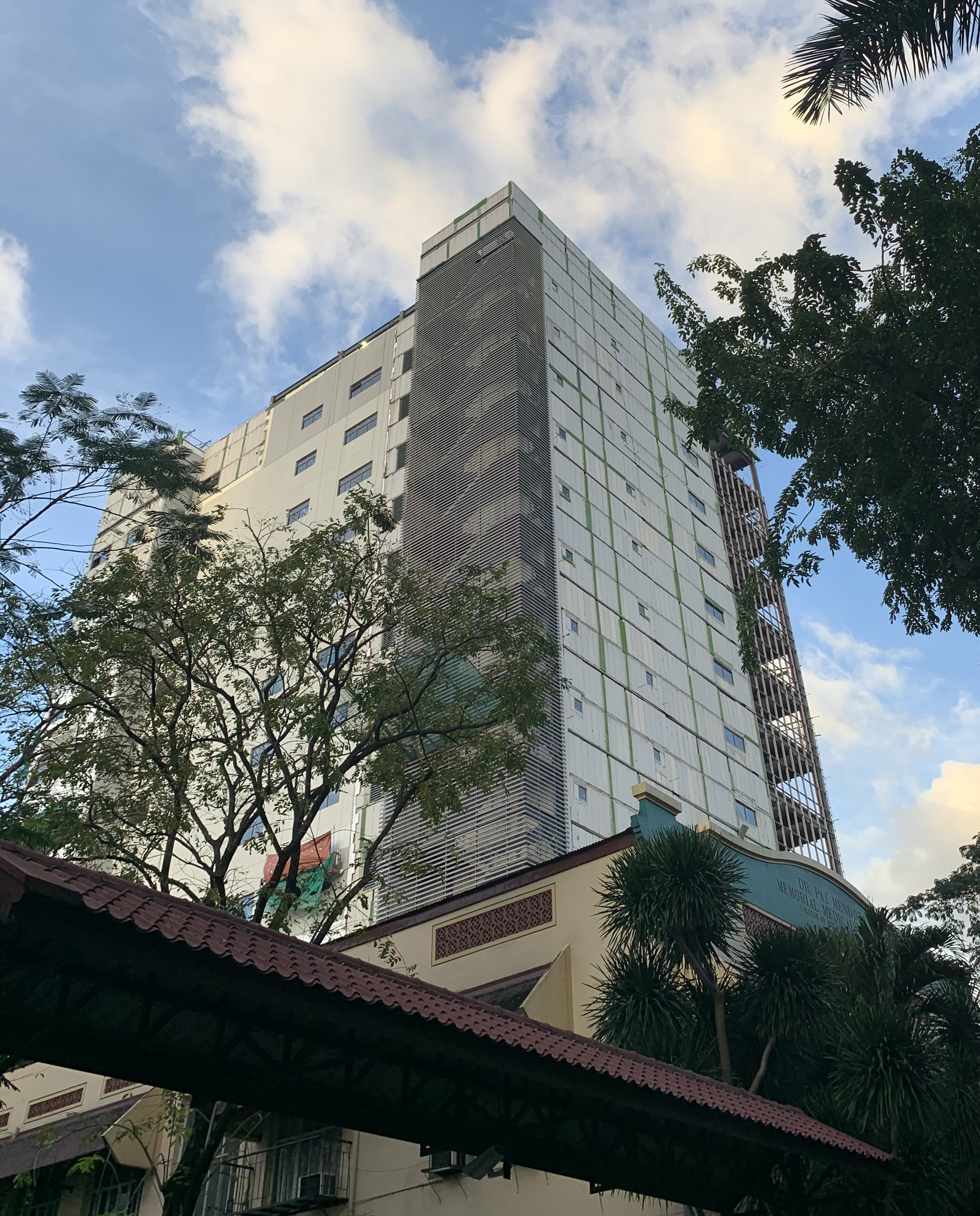
The new building of the National Institutes of Health is currently under construction.

The research units of UP Manila are housed in the National Institutes of Health (NIH), which also serves as the national health research center of the Philippines. As governed by the Health Research and Development Act of 1998, NIH conducts biomedical and public health research intended improve Philippine health services, promotion, and systems. The Manila Studies Program, a regional studies research center based in the College of Arts and Sciences, also conducts research and projects on heritage, urban development, and policy-related issues.

As the national university, UP Manila also provides technical support and research on health legislation. UP Manila research experts have worked towards the passage of the Newborn Screening Act in 2004, Universal Newborn Hearing Screening and Intervention Act of 2009, and the Rare Diseases Act of the Philippines of 2016 among others. UP Manila has also strongly opposed the conduct of local scientific studies and the legalization of medical marijuana.

Researches which exerted the biggest national impact on Philippine health care include several research-based program recommendations generated through the national surveys on blindness and the studies on Hepatitis B, diarrhea, and common parasitic infections, which were adopted by the Department of Health; commercialization of five herbal medicinal formulations (lagundi, yerba buena, tsaang gubat, sambong and akapulko); textbooks and instructional manuals which are also used by other academic institutions; and the performance evaluation of PhilHealth, the country's national health insurance program. Since the COVID-19 pandemic in 2020, the National Institutes Health has produced various research on COVID-19 testing, healthcare, and vaccination. NIH also locally produced coronavirus test kits and ventilators to address the lack of health supplies and equipment.

=== Rankings and reputation ===
The US News Best Global Universities Ranking places UPM at 447th place worldwide and 112th place in Asia. The Center for World University Ranking (CWUR) ranks UPM as second among all Philippine universities and 1,648th worldwide.

== Student life ==
UP Manila is a part on the University Belt, a de facto sub-district of the City of Manila where there is a high concentration or a cluster of colleges and universities.

=== Activism ===
Students of UP Manila are known for their activism, since the Supreme Court of the Philippines, the Court of Appeals, and the Department of Justice are located within its grounds. The university has plenty of student groups focused on political change. It also has a variety of partisan groups ranging from liberal to conservative, and several third party organizations.

== People ==
University of the Philippines Manila Chancellors
Name	Tenure of office
Conrado Ll. Lorenzo, Jr.	1984-1987
Ernesto O. Domingo	1987–1993
Perla D. Santos-Ocampo	1993-1999
Alfredo T. Ramirez	1999-2002
Marita V. T. Reyes	2002-2005
Ramon L. Arcadio	2005–2011
Manuel B. Agulto	2011–2014
Carmencita M. David-Padilla	2014–2023
Michael L. Tee	2023-present
References

The university has produced remarkable alumni in their respective fields. The 10th and current chancellor of the university is Dr. Michael L. Tee, who succeeded Dr. Carmencita M. Padilla, a National Scientist, in 2023.

=== 20th century ===
Notable people from UP Manila include Elpidio Quirino, the sixth President of the Philippines, who graduated from the university with a law degree in 1915. Fe del Mundo, a pediatrician, was known as the first woman to be admitted as a student in Harvard Medical School, and was the founder of the first pediatric hospital in the Philippines. She graduated from the university in 1933 as valedictorian of her class. In 1924, Alejandro Melchor, who served as a Secretary of National Defense, obtained his civil engineering degree with the highest honors at that time when the UP College of Engineering was still based in Manila. Other notable UP Manila alumni includes Martino Abellana, a renowned Cebuano painter, and Trinidad Tarrosa-Subido, a linguist and poet.

=== 21st century ===
Political figures who were graduates of UP Manila include Jinggoy Estrada, a Philippine Senator, and Enrique Manalo, who served as the Undersecretary for Policy of the Department of Foreign Affairs. Revolutionary leader Nur Misuari was also a graduate of UP Manila, who obtained his political science degree in 1962.

UP Manila alumni who served in the field of medical and health profession include three Secretaries of the Department of Health: Juan Flavier (1992-1995), who also served as a Senator from 1995 to 2007, Esperanza Cabral (2009-2010), and Enrique Ona (2010 to 2014).

Americans who graduated from UP Manila include two Brigadier General of the United States Air Force: Van N. Backman who obtained his Bachelor of Arts degree in 1955, and Patricia C. Lewis, who earned her master's degree from the university in 1977. Ernesto Domingo, a National Scientist of the Philippines, also graduated from the university. Alfredo Bengzon, the president and CEO of The Medical City obtained his doctor of medicine degree from the university. UPM alumni in academia include Paulo Campos, who was known for his work on nuclear medicine, Luciano P.R. Santiago, and Gregorio F. Zaide. The latter two are multi-awarded historians. In film, entertainment, and television, UPM is represented by comedian actress Maricel Laxa, and Vinci Montaner, a founding member of the band Parokya ni Edgar. Other prominent graduates include Victoria Tauli-Corpuz, an international activist for Igorot ethnicity and Norman King, the first Aeta graduate of the entire university system.

Some people, such as Diosdado Macapagal, the 9th Philippine President, Paz Latorena, a writer, and Grace Poe, a senator, attended UPM but did not graduate. Internationally recognized actor Elijah Canlas is currently taking BA Philippine Arts at the university.

Notable University of the Philippines Manila alumni include:

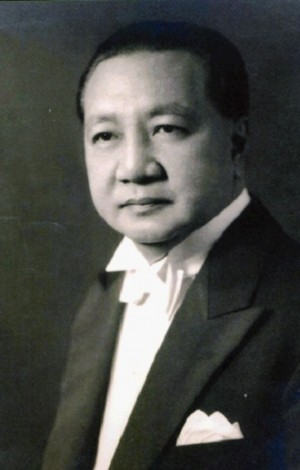
Elpidio Quirino, 6th president of the Philippines

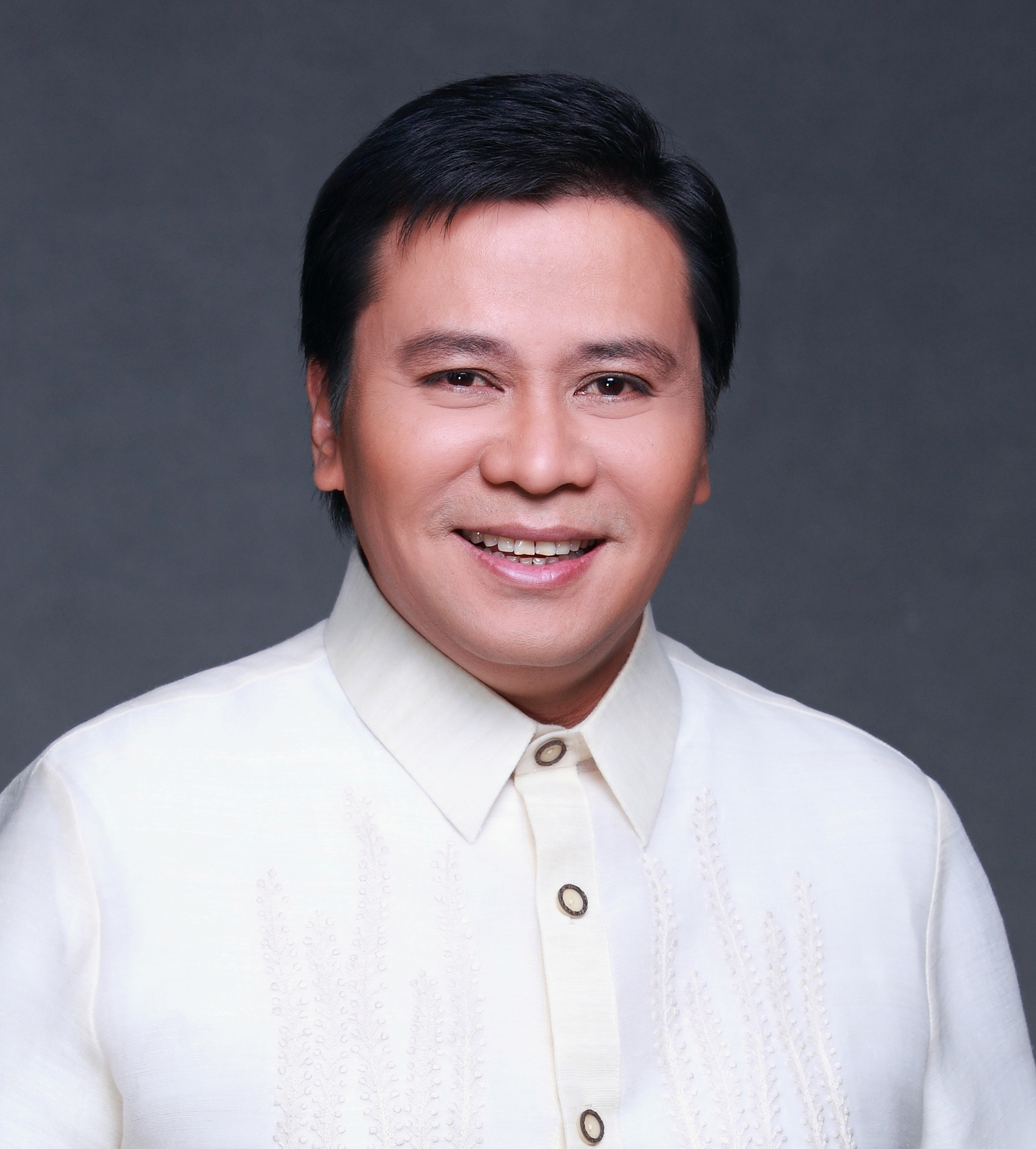
Jinggoy Estrada, Senator of the Philippines

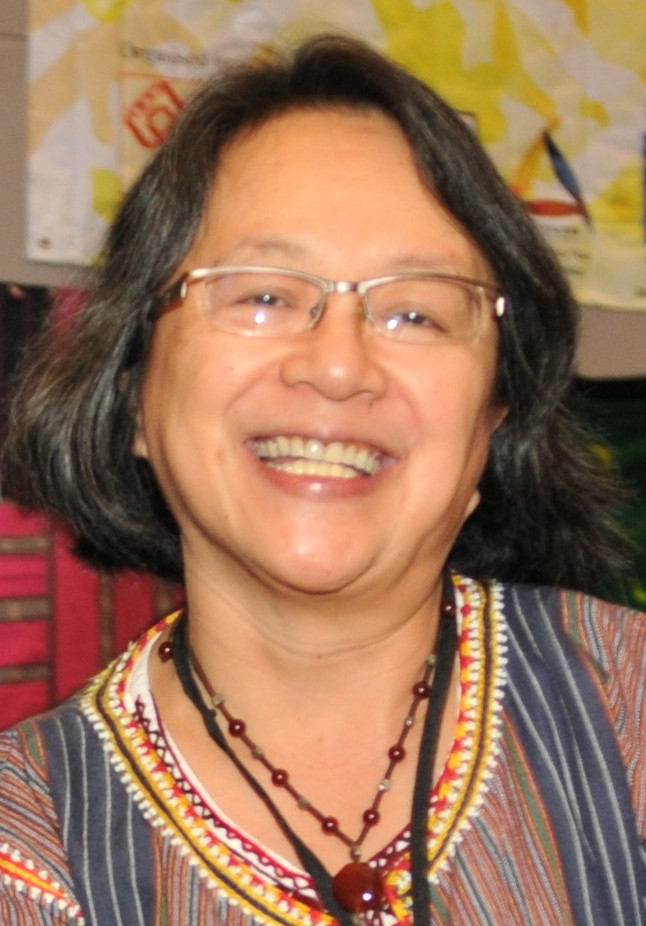
Victoria Tauli-Corpuz, international indigenous activist of Igorot ethnicity

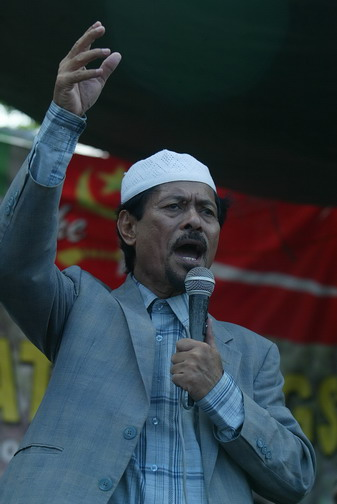
Nur Misuari, Moro revolutionary politician

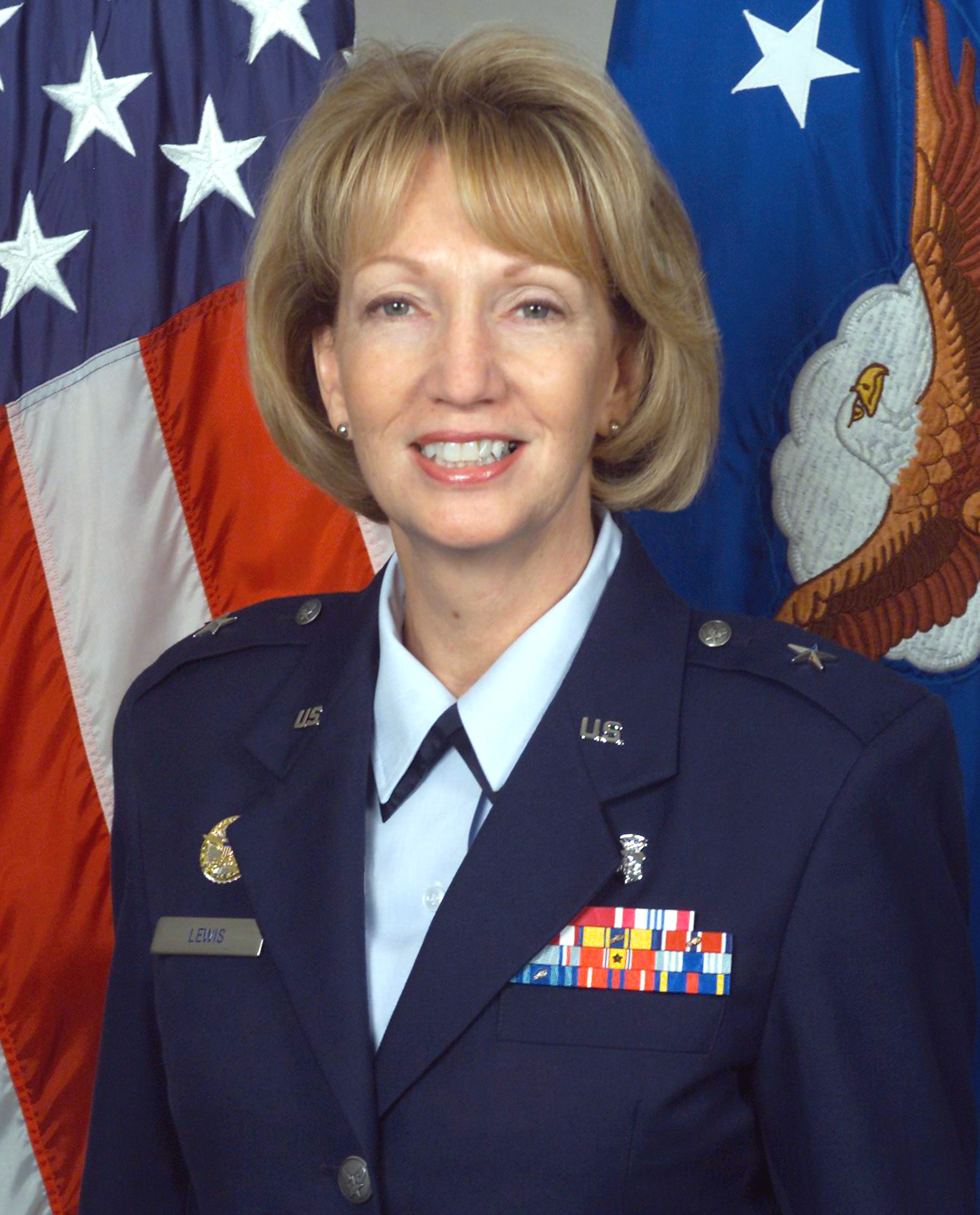
USAF Brigadier General Patricia C. Lewis

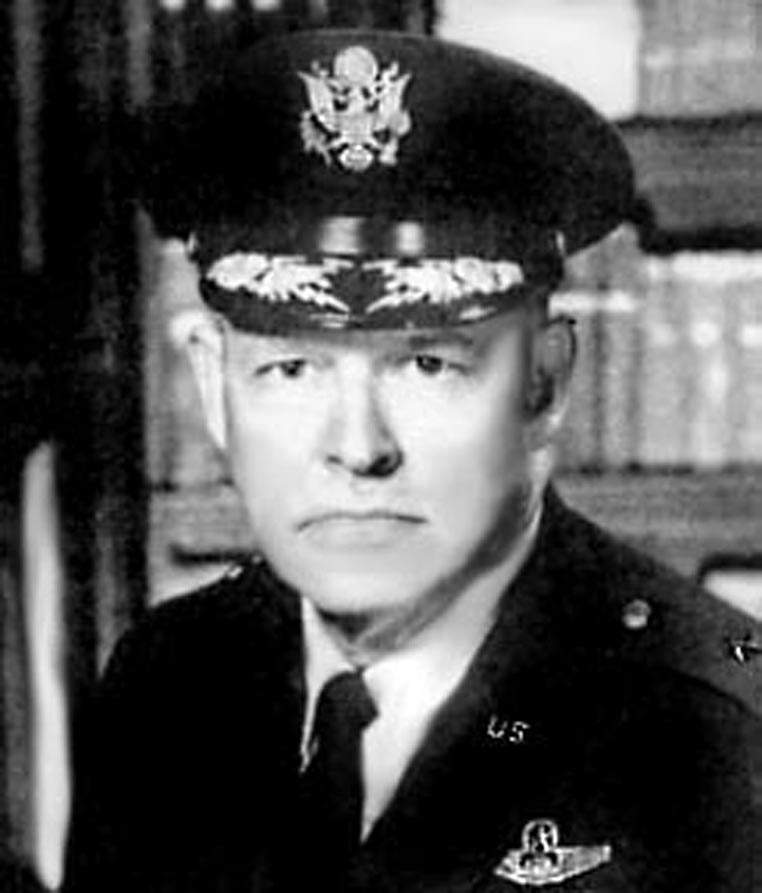
USAF Brigadier General Van N. Backman

== See also ==
- University of the Philippines Baguio
- University of the Philippines Cebu
- University of the Philippines Diliman
- University of the Philippines Los Baños
- University of the Philippines Mindanao
- University of the Philippines Open University
- University of the Philippines Tacloban
- University of the Philippines Visayas
