= Van N. Backman =

United States Airforce General

Van Nesbitt Backman
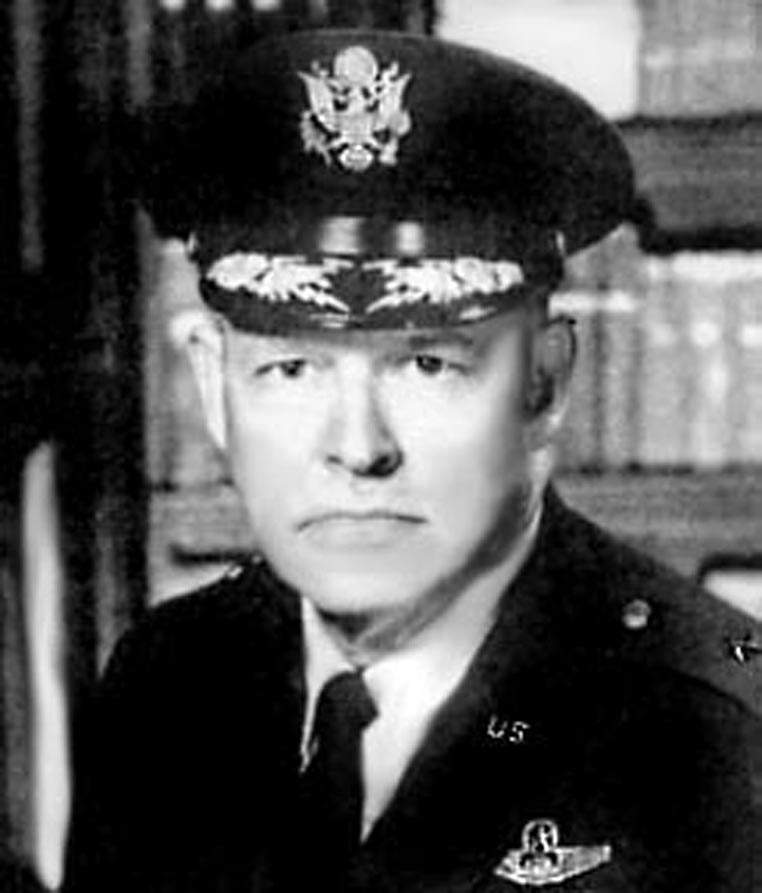
- Born: August 9, 1919; Milan, Washington, United States
- Died: October 25, 2015 (aged 96); Bemidji, Minnesota
- Military career
- Allegiance: United States of America
- Branch: United States Air Force
- Service years: 1942–1973
- Rank: Brigadier general
- Awards: Order of the Sword, Bronze Star Medal, Air Medal, Joint Service Commendation Medal, Air Force Commendation Medal, Air Force Outstanding Unit Award

Van Nesbitt Backman (August 9, 1919 – October 25, 2015) was a brigadier general in the United States Air Force who served as commander of the 62nd Military Airlift Wing, Military Airlift Command, McChord Air Force Base, Washington.

== Biography ==
Backman was born in Milan, Washington in 1919 and graduated from high school in Pine River, Minnesota. He graduated from the University of the Philippines Manila, in 1955 with a Bachelor of Arts degree and received a master's degree in international affairs from The George Washington University in 1964. He entered the Army aviation cadet program in January 1942 and received his pilot wings and commission as second lieutenant in August 1942.

In August 1942 he was assigned as pilot for a photographic squadron at Peterson Army Air Field, Colorado and later went with the squadron to the Southwest Pacific Area. During World War II he flew 65 combat missions in the P-38 and F-5 aircraft with the 5th Photographic Reconnaissance Group and also flew combat missions in the B-25 with the 308th Bombardment Wing. He is credited with a total of 147 combat hours. In April 1946 he was relieved from active duty and became a member of the Reserve at Wold-Chamberlain Airport, Minneapolis, Minnesota.

Backman was recalled to active duty in September 1948 as air provost marshal, 1001st Inspector General Unit, Langley Air Force Base, Virginia. In January 1950 Backman went to Andrews Air Force Base, Maryland and served as air provost marshal for Military Air Transport Service and later as director of security. From July 1953 to February 1954 he served as commander of the 14th Air Rescue Group at Palm Beach International Airport, Florida. He next served as deputy commander of the 2d Air Rescue Group in the Philippine Islands and then Hawaii. In August 1956 he entered the Air Command and Staff College at Maxwell Air Force Base, Alaska.

Backman returned to Andrews Air Force Base in July 1957 where he again was assigned to the inspector general, Military Air Transport Service and moved with the command to Scott Air Force Base, Ill. From June 1960 to August 1963 he was assigned as deputy group commander and subsequently as assistant deputy commander for operations, Headquarters 1608th Air Transport Wing at Charleston Air Force Base, S.C. From June to September 1960 he was on temporary duty as deputy commander for the provisional wing established to support operations in the Congo. He then returned to his organization at Charleston Air Force Base.

From July 1963 to June 1964 he attended the U.S. Naval War College in Newport, Rhode Island. After graduating he went overseas to Okinawa as deputy for operations, Detachment 1, 315th Air Division, (later reorganized as the 374th Troop Carrier Wing). In June 1967 he returned to the United States and was assigned to the Organization of the Joint Chiefs of Staff, Washington, D.C. as a member of the Operations Division, Special Assistant for Strategic Mobility.

Backman was appointed vice commander, 63d Military Airlift Wing, at Norton Air Force Base, California, in July 1969. He became commander of the 62d Military Airlift Wing, MAC, at McChord Air Force Base, Washington, in March 1970. His military decorations and awards include the Bronze Star Medal, Air Medal with oak leaf cluster, Joint Service Commendation Medal, Air Force Commendation Medal, and Air Force Outstanding Unit Award Ribbon with two oak leaf clusters. He was promoted to the temporary grade of brigadier general effective June 1, 1971, with date of rank May 27, 1971. He retired on June 1, 1973, as brigadier general.
