= Ernesto Domingo =

Filipino scientist

Ernesto O. Domingo ONS
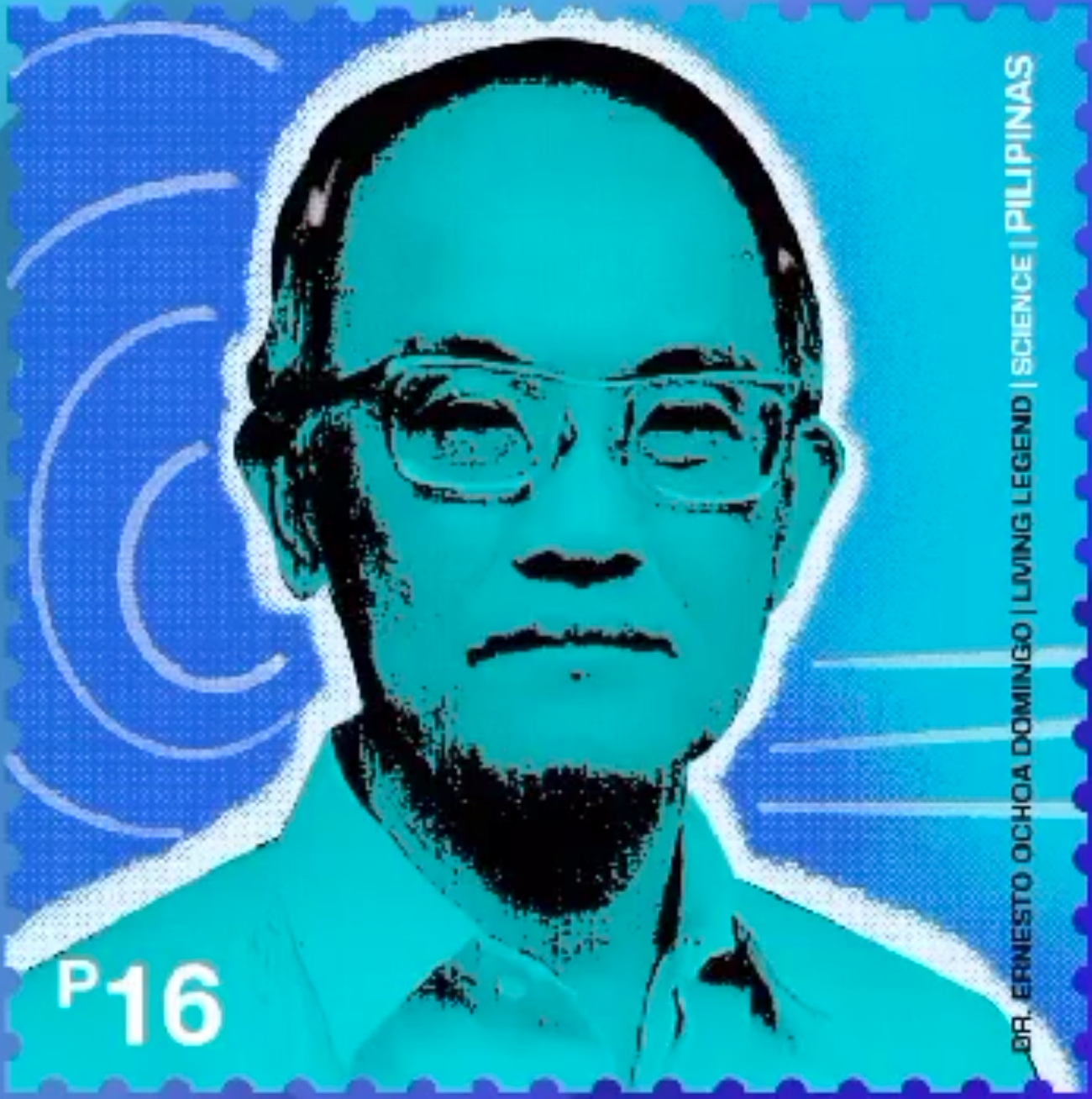
- Domingo on a 2022 stamp of the Philippines

2nd Chancellor of University of the Philippines Manila
- In office 1987–1993
- Preceded by: Conrado Ll. Lorenzo, Jr.
- Succeeded by: Perla Santos-Ocampo

Personal details
- Born: June 28, 1930 (age 96) Malabon, Philippine Islands
- Party: People's Reform Party
- Education: University of the Philippines Manila
- Occupation: Doctor and Educator
- Awards: Order of National Scientists of the Philippines (2010); Ramon Magsaysay Award

Ernesto O. Domingo (born June 28, 1930) is a National Scientist of the Philippines and professor emeritus at the University of the Philippines College of Medicine at UP Manila. He was born in Malabon City. Domingo is a specialist in hepatology and gastroenterology. He organized the UPM Liver Study Group and undertook important investigations of viral hepatitis and liver disease, establishing a causal link between chronic hepatitis B and liver cancer. His study has saved millions of individuals from life-threatening illnesses and decreased healthcare expenditures by identifying the preventive approach to liver cancer.

Domingo taught at UP Manila for 34 years, starting as an assistant professor and eventually becoming a full professor. He has fought for the hepatitis vaccine to be made mandatory and available to all, as he is worried about the poor's access to health care. He has also successfully advocated for a bill that provides annual fiscal assistance for neonatal hepatitis immunization by working closely with politicians. He has received the 2013 Ramon Magsaysay Award for his work.
