= Perla Santos-Ocampo =

Filipino pediatrician (1931–2012)

Perla Dizon Santos-Ocampo ONS

3rd Chancellor of University of the Philippines Manila
- In office 1993–1999
- Preceded by: Ernesto Domingo
- Succeeded by: Alfredo T. Ramirez

Personal details
- Born: Perla Dizon Santos; July 25, 1931 Dagupan, Pangasinan, Philippine Islands
- Died: June 29, 2012 (aged 80) Metro Manila, Philippines
- Education: University of the Philippines Manila
- Occupation: Pediatrician
- Known for: National Scientist of the Philippines
- Awards: Order of National Scientists of the Philippines (2010)

Perla Dizon Santos Ocampo, MD ONS (née Santos; July 25, 1931 – June 29, 2012) was a Filipina pediatrician.

== Early life and education ==
Perla Santos-Ocampo was born in Dagupan, Pangasinan on July 25, 1931. She pursued a medical degree at the University of the Philippines Manila and graduated in 1955. She also pursued post-graduate pediatrics training at the UP-Philippine General Hospital, and a fellowship at Case Western Reserve University in Cleveland, Ohio in the United States.

== Career ==
The policy of the Philippine Department of Health on diarrhea-related health concerns was based on Santos-Ocampo's research on diarrheal disease. Her research on the relation of malnutrition and child growth and development was instrumental to the country's fight against child malnutrition.

Santos-Ocampo also served as the Chancellor of the University of the Philippines Manila where she was noted for developing academic programs to increase the quality of health education offered by the university. She was also instrumental to the establishment of the National Institutes of Health, the National Graduate School of the Health Sciences, and the National Telehealth Center.

Santos-Ocampo was honored as a National Scientist of the Philippines on 2011.

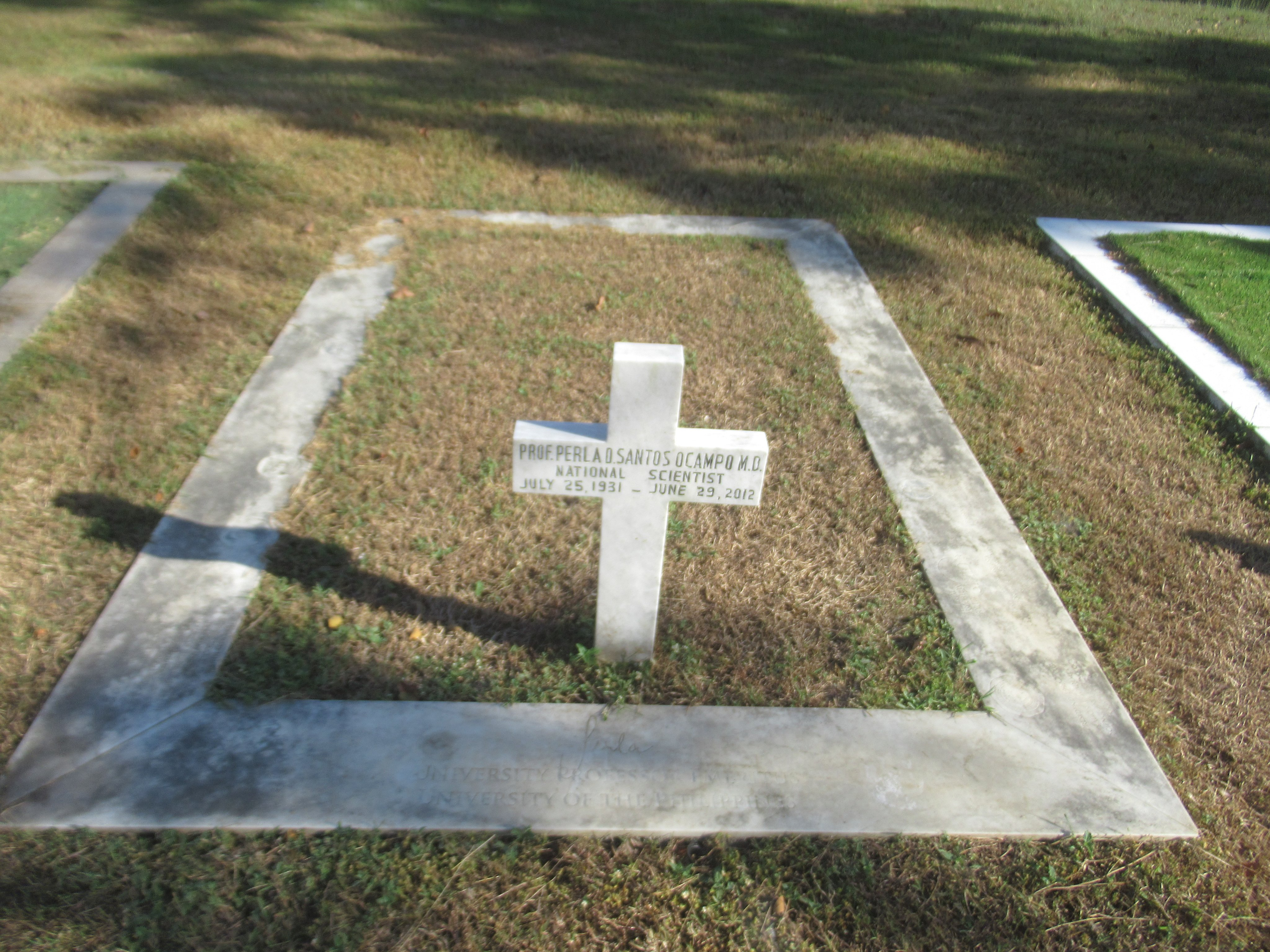
Santos-Ocampo's grave at the Libingan ng mga Bayani.

== Death ==
Perla Santos-Ocampo died on June 29, 2012. She died of respiratory failure due to colon cancer.
