= Trinidad Tarrosa-Subido =

Filipina writer (1912–1994)

- Born: June 14, 1912; Shanghai, China
- Died: February 7, 1994 (aged 81)
- Education: University of the Philippines
- Occupation: Writer
- Spouse: Abelrado Subido (m.1939)

Trinidad Tarrosa-Subido (14 June 1912 – 7 February 1994) was a Filipina linguist, writer, and poet who wrote of the Filipino woman’s experience using the English language during and after the American colonial period in the Philippines. She wrote under many names, sometimes using her full name of Trinidad Tarrosa-Subido, Tarrosa Subido, Trinidad L. Tarrosa, T.L. Tarrosa, and even used the name Eloisa.

== Biography ==
Tarrosa-Subido was born to Filipino parents in Shanghai, China, where her father worked as a musician. Her immediate family had moved to British Hong Kong when she was young, and lived there for a few years until her father died. After her father died, Tarrosa-Subido and her mother returned to Manila in 1917. She was sent to live with her mother's family when they returned to Manila, and her aunt taught at Quiapo Primary School, where she was admitted a year earlier than typically allowed. It is believed that this is because she already spoke English, learning the language in Hong Kong.

=== Education ===
Tarrosa-Subido graduated from Manila East High School, and in 1929, she took the civil service examination in order to work in the Bureau of Education, and passed it with a grade of 97 percent, the highest then on record. She enrolled as a working student at the University of the Philippines Manila (UP) in 1932. She loved her time at UP and even became a member of the UP Writers Club and contributed her sonnets. It was here that she met her husband, Abelardo Subido, and they married in 1936. With her husband, they established the Manila Post Publishing Company and published many of their own works, along with kickstarting a daily newspaper, the Manila Post. She leaves a legacy at the university as she wrote the UP Women's Club Song, and the poem that is recited for school rituals. Tarrosa-Subido graduated cum laude with a Bachelor of Philosophy in English in 1937. Being able to write literature in English at this time was unseen for many women, and Tarrosa-Subido defied expectations doubly as she had a great command of the language, along with writing about topics that were typically not meant for women. She wrote of more than just love stories, she also wrote of the woman's experience of post-colonial Philippines, and how they moved politically into the Modern Filipina.

== Career and writing ==
=== Career ===
Tarrosa Subido was encouraged to begin writing and publishing her stories when she worked at the Bureau of Education by one of her senior colleagues. She was published in the Graphic, and "was selected by Jose Garcia Villa as one of the best poems of 1931".

In 1933, she was published in the Philippine Magazine, and was also printed in an American publication. It was the first Filipino poem to be printed in America, and because of this, she was invited to the Malacanang to read her sonnets to government officials.

She then began to work at the Institute of National Language. In 1940, she published Tagalog Phonetics and Orthography, which she co-authored with Virginia Gamboa-Mendoza. In 1945, she and her husband published poems titled Three Voices, with an introduction by Salvador P. Lopez. After the war, the Subidos put up a daily newspaper, The Manila Post, which closed in 1947 and made her a freelance writer.

Tarrosa-Subido's journalism career was well-established, as she became a magazine editor for the Philippines Herald, a managing editor of the Philippine Journal of Home Economics, and editor of the Women and Clubs section of the Kislap-graphic magazine. It was also in the Kislap-graphic magazine that she had a weekly column titled "Homemaking is my Business." In 1950, her translation in English of "Florante at Laura" by Francisco Balagtas was recognized.

=== Feminism and contributions to women ===
She retired in 1971, and in 1984, she was invited by the Women in Media Now to write the introduction to Filipina I, the first anthology consisting of works made exclusively by Filipino women. She was honored in 1991 by the Unyon ng Mga Manunulat sa Pilipinas (UMPIL).

Her contributions to women can be seen in her involvement with women's clubs in the Philippines, where she held the following roles:

1. President, Philippine Association of Women Writers;
2. Director, Manila Newspaperwomen's Club;
3. Member, Civic Assembly of Women of the Philippines;
4. Member, National Movement for Free Elections;
5. Member, Citizen's Committee for Moral Crusade;
6. Member, Manila Girl Scouts Council.

=== Brief history of the feminist movement in the Philippines ===
In 1954, she was commissioned to write "The Feminist Movement in the Philippines" This book was a testament to the roots of feminism in the Philippines, and within it Tarrosa-Subido said that due to the time constraint, she was "not allowed to do full justice to the subject". It was also within this book that Tarrosa-Subido summarized many of the successes of feminism for the political, civil, economic, and social standing of women. She noted that it was not an easy compilation to write.

She began the book by discussing the past of the feminist movement in the Philippines, and how colonialism has affected their lives. In the first chapter, she details that in pre-Spanish times, women were equal to men. They were able to hold high positions in society and were recognized as individuals. It was during American rule that women were subjugated and Tarrosa-Subido discusses how Filipino women had to regain their equality by taking advantage of the systems that were established by the American administration. She goes on to further describe the political and social gains of women in the Philippines in the book, from documenting the suffrage movement to how women are expected to behave in the home. She did not portray women as passive members of society, she wrote about the key roles they played and the significance they had in reclaiming their own agency. Filipino women, especially transpacific Filipino women, were very critical of the Philippine-American relations, and were actively wrestling with these connections. Tarrosa-Subido does note that the pre-colonial woman is most closely representative of the model for women's equality to men.

She sees women as having an active role in their own lives, and this has been seen in her poetry as well. In her poem "Subterfuge," it was the woman who encourages her lover to come to her, and this shows how Tarrosa-Subido views women as mobilized through their context.

=== Posthumous legacies ===
==== Posthumous writings ====
In 2002, her family published a manuscript Tarrosa-Subido had been working on at the time of her death. Titled Private Edition: Sonnets and Other Poems (Milestone Publications), the retrospective volume contains 89 poems, a few of them revised and retitled versions of the originals. One of them is "To My Native Land," which is one of her most impactful writings.

==== Legacies in the Philippines ====
The context of women in the Philippines is based in a conservative, religious patriarchy, valuing the typical nuclear family. It is largely Roman Catholic, due to the Spanish colonial legacies, and these together have cemented patriarchal rule, and the further colonization of the Philippines by the United States of America reinforced this.

To this day, women are affected by the legacies of the patriarchy. This has been highlighted by Dorothy Friesen, and furthermore she details how it is through Filipino women writing about their experience that they were able to highlight their obstacles and hardships. It was also through this that women were able to come together and mobilize to fight back against the oppressive Marcos government. After this administration, a political party was formed called the General Assembly Binding Women for Reforms, Integrity, Equality, Leadership, and Action (GABRIELA), which advocates for women and the socioeconomic equality in government. They have brought women together across the Philippines, and have tried to connect with the youth and educate them on women's rights issues by interacting with celebrities. This, however, has showcased the patriarchy which Tarrosa-Subido highlighted in her poetry. The women involved with GABRIELA have been threatened with rape and death by Philippine Generals. This showcases Tarrosa-Subido's truth that feminism in the Philippines is growing and evident, but is still developing.
