= National Social Scientist of the Philippines =

Philippine order

Order of National Social Scientists

Awarded by Philippines
- Type: Order
- Awarded for: Life achievement in the social sciences
- Status: Currently constituted
- Sovereign: President of the Philippines

Precedence
- Next (higher): Order of Gabriela Silang
- Next (lower): Gawad Mabini
- Equivalent: Order of National Artists, Order of National Scientists, Gawad sa Manlilikha ng Bayan, Order of Lakandula – Special Class of Champion for Life
- Ribbon bar of the order

The Order of National Social Scientists, abbreviated as ONSS (Filipino: Orden ng mga Pambansang Alagad ng Agham Panlipunan) is an honor given by the Republic of the Philippines. The Order of National Social Scientists is the highest national recognition conferred upon Filipinos for life achievement in the Social Sciences.

== Background ==
Presidential Decree No. 1003-A issued by President Ferdinand Marcos on December 17, 1976, created the National Academy of Sciences composed of outstanding scientists. The Academy was authorized to "establish not more than ten yearly awards to scientists for distinguished achievement in science who shall be accorded by the President the rank and title of "National Scientist"".

== Nomination and selection ==
The recipients of the Order of National Social Scientists are recommended annually by the National Academy of Science and Technology. It is the task of the Academy, which is composed of Filipino scientists, to recommend not more than ten (10) individuals who shall be accorded by the President the rank and title of National Social Scientist. It is the President of the Philippines who makes the ultimate selection, which is based on "distinguished individual or collaborative achievement in science and technology." National Social Scientists are given gratuities and are entitled to privileges enjoyed by National Scientists.

The Honors Code of 2003 was the code that created the Order of National Social Scientists, grouped and ranked with the Order of National Scientists and the Order of National Artists as the Order of Artistic, Cultural, and Scientific Merit of the Republic. This in effect removed social scientists under the purview of the Order of National Scientists, and established it as a separate order. As of 2020, the award has been given to a total of eight (8) social scientists. The last conferment was held last 2011 to National Scientist Raul V. Fabella for his significant contributions in the field of Economics.

== Benefits ==
Awardees are conferred the rank and title of "National Social Scientist", with an accompanying medallion and citation. They are also given a financial gratuity with the amount determined by the Academy. In addition, they are entitled to the same privileges enjoyed by National Artists of the Philippines, which include a monthly life pension, medical and hospitalization benefits, and a place of honor, in line with protocular precedence, at national state functions. They are likewise by law entitled upon death to a state funeral conducted by the National Academy and the Armed Forces of the Philippines, befitting their recognized status as heroes of the Philippines.

== Roster of National Social Scientists ==
As of August 2020, there have been five (5) men and three (3) women who have been designated as National Social Scientist in the roster where two (2) of them are currently living. The most recent conferment was made to honor NS Raul V. Fabella.

Image	Name	Field of Specialization	Declaration/ Proclamation	Year Conferred
Official portrait of Teodoro Agoncillo, National Academy of Science and Technology	Teodoro Agoncillo	Philippine History		1985
Official portrait of Encarnacion Alzona from the National Academy of Science and Technology	Encarnacion Alzona	History		1985
Jose Encarnacion Jr., National Academy for Science and Technology	José Encarnación Jr.	Economics		1987
Alfredo Lagmay, National Academy of Science and Technology	Alfredo Lagmay	Experimental Psychology		1988
Gelia T. Castillo ONS	Gelia Castillo	Rural Sociology		1999
	Onofre Corpuz	Political Economics and Government		2004
Mercedes Concepcion	Mercedes Concepcion	Demography	Presidential Proclamation No. 1980, January 14, 2010	2010
Raul Fabella, National Academy of Science and Technology	Raul Fabella	Economics	Presidential Proclamation NO. 208, July 27, 2011	2011
