= Julian Banzon =

Filipino biochemist (1908–1988)

Julian Banzon ONS
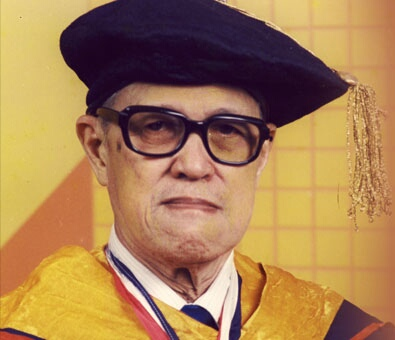
- Julian Banzon from the Official Gazette of the Republic of the Philippines
- Born: 25 March 1908; Balanga, Bataan, Philippine Islands
- Died: 13 September 1988 (aged 80)
- Citizenship: Filipino
- Education: University of the Philippines Manila; Iowa State University
- Spouse: Vicencia Fernandez
- Children: 10
- Awards: Order of National Scientists of the Philippines (1986)
- Scientific career
- Fields: Biochemistry
- Workplaces: University of the Philippines Los Baños
- Thesis: Fermentative utilization of cassava; the production of ethanol (1949)

Julián Arca Banzón (March 25, 1908 – September 13, 1988) was a Filipino biochemist and a National Scientist of the Philippines. Banzon is credited for his research in alternative fuel. He researched on the production of ethyl ester fuels from sugarcane and coconuts and devised a method of extracting residual coconut oil through chemical means.

== Early life and education ==
Julian Banzon was born on March 25, 1908, to Manuel S. Banzon and Arcadia Arca in Balanga, Bataan.

Banzon graduated from the University of the Philippines in Manila in 1930 with a degree of Bachelor of Science in chemistry. After some years working as an instructor at his alma mater, in 1937 he entered the Iowa State University in the United States as a UP pensionado. Banzon obtained a Doctor of Philosophy degree in biochemistry and a minor in Microbiology in 1940. The topic of his doctoral dissertation was the “fermentative utilization of cassava.”

== Career ==
Right after Banzon's graduation from the University of the Philippines, he worked as an assistant instructor at the University of the Philippines College of Agriculture in 1930 and was later promoted to instructor in agricultural chemistry in the same college. Banzon later pursued graduate studies.

Banzon later returned to the Philippines to work as an assistant professor in agricultural chemistry at the UP College of Agriculture. His teaching stint as an assistant professor ended in 1951. He later served as associate professor, associate chemist, and assistant head of the Department of Agricultural Chemistry from 1951 to 1955. Banzon received an aid for his study on the use of radioisotopes in agriculture in through an ICA Type A grant in 1956. In 1958, he was appointed as chief scientist of the Philippine Atomic Energy Commission. One of the highlights of Banzon's career was his tenure as the first director of the Philippine Atomic Research Center from 1960 to 1963. He was given a plaque of appreciation by the research center.

Banzon resumed his career at the UP College of Agriculture, where he worked as professor and chairman of the department of agriculture chemistry from August 1, 1963, to March 24, 1970. He was the officer-in-charge of the division of food science and technology at UP Los Baños from March 25, 1970, to June 30, 1972. From July 1972 to March 1973, he served as a professor of food and science technology, and retired from the UP College of Agriculture at the end of his teaching stint in 1973.

Banzon was frequently invited to attend scientific conferences abroad. He participated in the board of governors meeting of the International Atomic Energy Agency (IAEA) and in the general conference in Vienna, Austria, both held in 1960. In October 1981, he was an attendee of the Fourth Japan Conference on Radioisotopes held in Kyoto, Japan. Banzon also went to Bangkok, Thailand to attend the IAEA's Study Group Meeting on the Utilization of Research Reactors held from December 17 to 21, 1962. He was also part of the Philippine delegation to attend the 11th Pacific Science Congress held in Tokyo, Japan and 12th Pacific Science Congress in Canberra, Australia held in August 1966 and August 1971 respectively.

He also held the position of chairman at the division of chemical and pharmaceutical science of the National Research Council of the Philippines and was a member of the Chemical Society of the Philippines' board of directors, from 1972 to 1973. Banzon was also member of the Society for the Advancement of Research, the Sigma Xi of Iowa State University and the Radioisotopes Society of the Philippines. Banzon was also the president of the Gamma Sigma Delta Honor Society of Agriculture, UP Los Baños Chapter.

He was named as one of the members of the National Academy of Science and Technology (NAST) along with Clare Baltazar and Armando Dalisay on July 9, 1981. From 1985 to 1988, he was a member of the NAST executive council.

== Awards ==
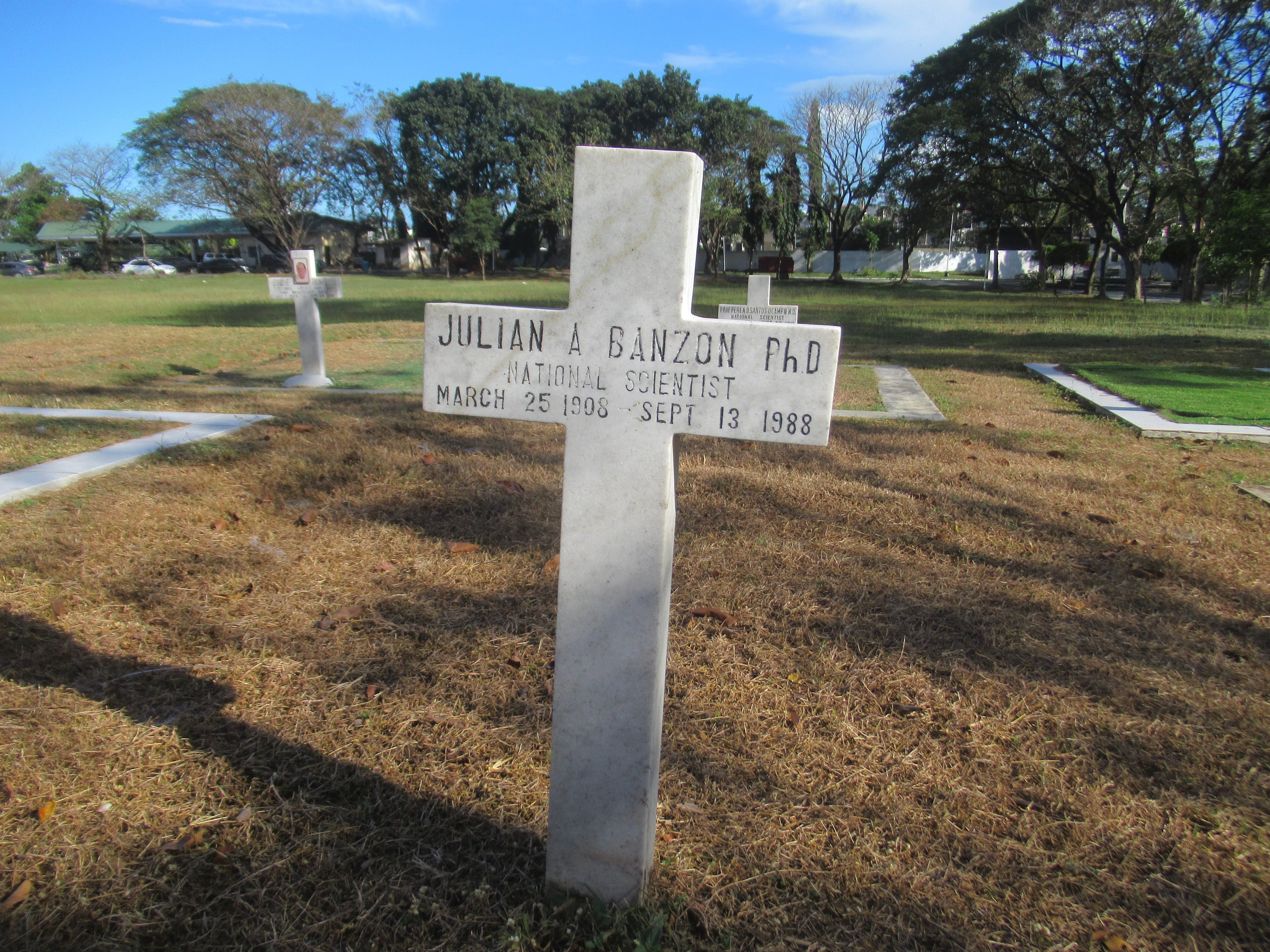
Banzon's grave at the Libingan ng mga Bayani.

Banzon received numerous awards for his works. On July 14, 1959, the office of the secretary of the Department of Agriculture and Natural Resources awarded him a certificate of merit for his “Distinguished Research Work on Extraction of Coconut Oil”. He was also awarded a plaque as outstanding chemical graduate by the UP Chemical Society of the Philippines and the PHILSUGIN award for research by the Crop Society of the Philippine in 1976. Banzon was also named "Chemist of the Year" by the Professional Regulation Commission in 1978. In 1980 he was awarded Distinguished Service Award by the Integrated Chemists of the Philippines, Incorporated, and in 1986, the University of the Philippines conferred him with its Distinguished Alumnus Award. In July 1986, he was conferred National Scientist of the Philippines by then President Corazon Aquino for his contribution in the field of chemistry in the country.
