= Gawad Mabini =

Philippine order

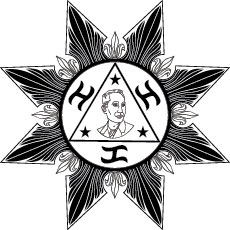
- Emblem of the Gawad Mabini, which appears on the collar bestowed on members.

Awarded by Philippines
- Type: Order
- Awarded for: Filipinos who have rendered distinguished service or promoted the interests of the Republic of the Philippines at home and abroad
- Status: Currently constituted
- Sovereign: President of the Philippines
- Grades: Grand Cross; Commander; Member

Precedence
- Next (higher): Order of National Artists, Order of National Scientists, Order of National Social Scientists, Gawad sa Manlilikha ng Bayan, Order of Lakandula - Special Class of Champion for Life
- Next (lower): Order of the Golden Heart
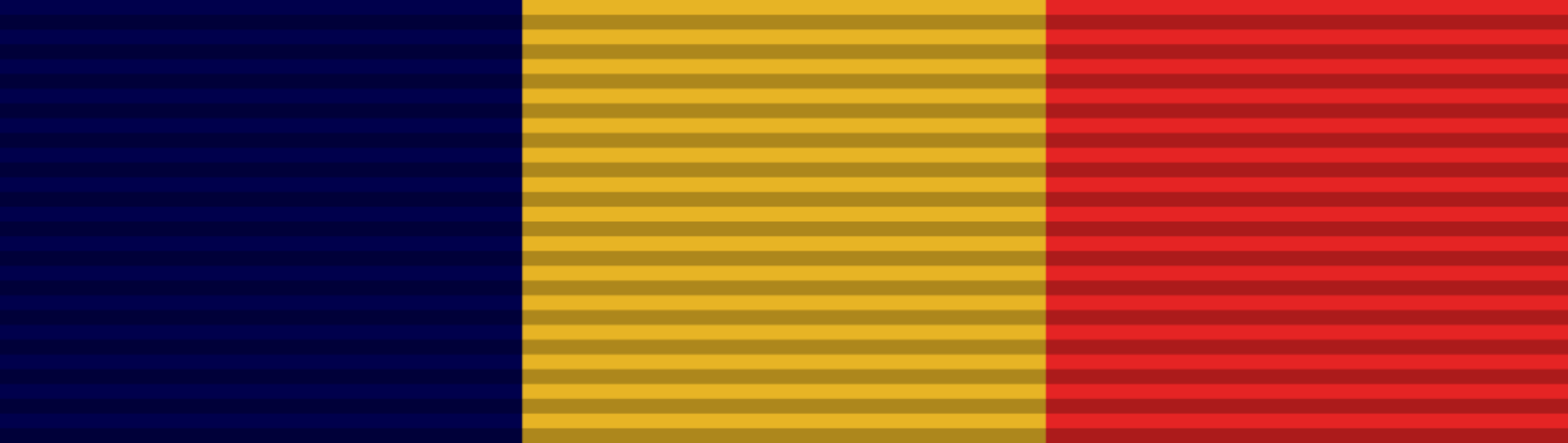
- Ribbon bar of the order

Gawad Mabini is an order of the Philippines bestowed by the President.

== History ==
Created by President Ferdinand Marcos through Presidential Decree No. 490 on June 24, 1974, the Gawad Mabini may be conferred upon personnel of the DFA, both in the Home Office and in the Foreign Service, and upon Filipinos who have rendered distinguished service or promoted the interests of the Republic of the Philippines at home and abroad.

== Award ==
The Gawad Mabini may be conferred by the Secretary of Foreign Affairs in the name and by authority of the President.

The Gawad Mabini shall be conferred on July 22 of every year, to commemorate the birth anniversary of Apolinario Mabini, the first Secretary of Foreign Affairs of the Republic of the Philippines.

== Ranks ==
The Gawad Mabini shall be composed of three ranks :

Grand Cross (GCrM) (Dakilang Kamanong) - Conferred upon a former or incumbent Secretary of Foreign Affairs, Chief of Mission, cabinet member or other high official who headed a Philippine delegation to an important international conference on a ministerial level and as a result thereof, made substantive contributions to public interest and public welfare

Commander (CM) (Dakilang Kasugo) - Conferred upon an officer with a rank between career minister to foreign service officer class IV, or upon personnel of a government agency who serves as an Attache in a Foreign Service establishment, as recommended by the Chief of Mission or the Principal Officer of the post served, as the case may be, or by the Secretary of Foreign Affairs, in the case of personnel in the Home Office.

Member (MM) (Kasugo) - Conferred upon a staff officer or employee of the DFA, as recommended by the Chief of Mission or the Principal Officer of the post served, as the case may be, or by the Secretary of Foreign Affairs, in the case of personnel in the Home Office.

== Notable Recipients ==
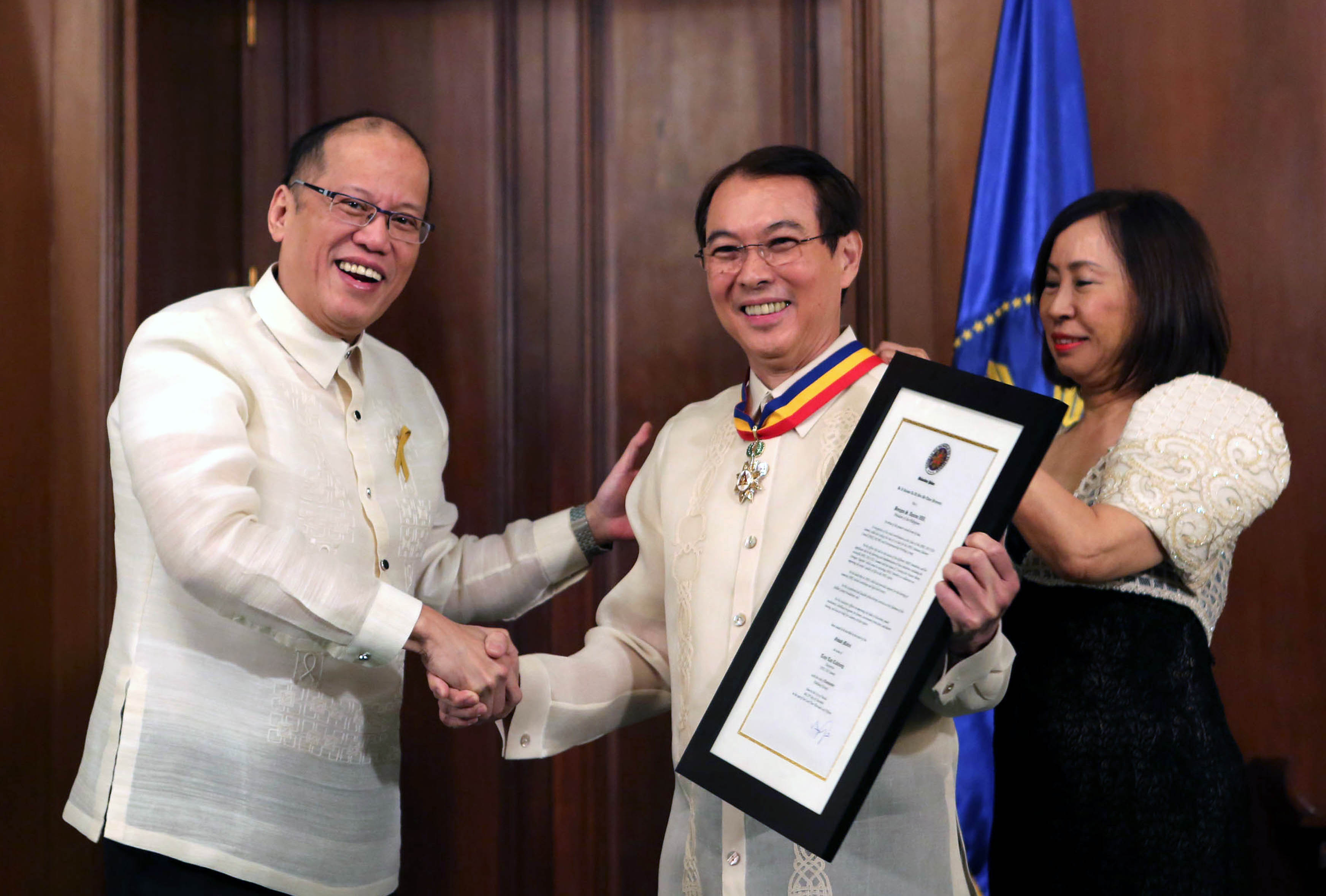
President Benigno S. Aquino III confers the Gawad Mabini with the rank of Commander (Dakilang Kasugo) on APEC CEO Summit chairperson Tony Tan Caktiong in a ceremony at the Music Room of the Malacañan Palace

Grand Cross (Dakilang Kamanong)

- Diosdado Macapagal (1994) – 9th President of the Philippines
- Salvador Laurel (1996) – 8th Vice President of the Philippines, and 16th Secretary of Foreign Affairs
- Carlos P. Romulo (2005, posthumous) – 4th President of the United Nations General Assembly, 14th Secretary of the Department of the Foreign Affairs
- Narciso Ramos (1996, posthumous) – 13th Secretary of Foreign Affairs, and one of the founding fathers of the Association of Southeast Asian Nations
- Arturo Tolentino (1995) – 15th Secretary of Foreign Affairs
- Manuel Yan (1998) – 17th Secretary of Foreign Affairs
- Manuel Collantes (2001) – acting Minister of Foreign Affairs in 1984.
- Enrique Manalo (2017) – acting Secretary of Foreign Affairs and Undersecretary for Policy of the Department of Foreign Affairs
- Leticia Ramos-Shahani (1994) – former senator, former Deputy Minister of Foreign Affairs, and former UN Assistant Secretary-General for Social and Humanitarian Affairs
- Mamintal A.J. Tamano (2001) – former senator, and former Deputy Minister of Foreign Affairs
- Imelda Marcos (1979) – former First Lady of the Philippines, and appointed Ambassador Plenipotentiary and Extraordinary. First recipient of the Order.
- León Ma. Guerrero (1982) – former Undersecretary of Foreign Affairs, and former ambassador
- Rafael Ileto (1998) – former ambassador to Iran and Turkey from 1975 to 1980, and to Thailand, Cambodia, and Laos from 1980 to 1986.
- Roy Cimatu (2003) – Special Envoy to the Middle East and head of the Middle East Preparedness Team (MEPT) in 2002
- Domingo Lucenario Jr. (2007) – former ambassador to Kenya and Philippine Permanent Representative to the United Nations Environment Program (UNEP) and the United Nations Human Settlement Program (UN Habitat.
- Federico M. Macaranas (2001) – former Undersecretary for Economic Affairs at the Department of Foreign Affairs
- Lauro Baja (1999) – former Undersecretary of Foreign Affairs

Commander (Dakilang Kasugo)

- Tony Tan Caktiong (2016) – for his contributions as chairman of the Asia-Pacific Economic Cooperation (APEC) 2015 Chief Executive Officers (CEO) Summit.
- Jaime Augusto Zobel de Ayala (2015) – for his contributions as chairman of the APEC 2015 Private Sector Advisory Council and co-chaired the ABAC Sustainable Development Working Group.

== Sources ==
EXECUTIVE ORDER NO. 236 of September 19, 2003, ESTABLISHING THE HONORS CODE OF THE PHILIPPINES TO CREATE AN ORDER OF PRECEDENCE OF HONORS CONFERRED AND FOR OTHER PURPOSES .
