= Clara Lim-Sylianco =

Filipino chemist (1925–2013)

Clara Y. Lim-Sylianco ONS
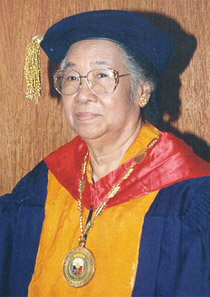
- Official portrait, National Academy of Science and Technology
- Born: August 18, 1925; Guihulngan City, Negros Oriental, Philippine Islands
- Died: 23 July 2013 (aged 87)
- Education: Silliman University (B.S., 1949); University of the Philippines (M.S., 1953); University of Iowa (Ph.D., 1957)
- Occupation: Chemist
- Known for: Organic Chemistry; Biochemistry
- Awards: Order of National Scientists of the Philippines (1994)

Clara Y. Lim-Sylianco (18 August 1925 – 23 July 2013) was a Filipino chemist who was granted the title of National Scientist of the Philippines in 1994. Lim-Sylianco's research focused on mutagens, antimutagens, and bio-organic mechanisms. She has published articles, books, and monographs in organic chemistry, biochemistry, genetic toxicology, and molecular nutrition. Also an educator, Lim-Sylianco has written books that are used as reference texts in college chemistry courses in the Philippines.

== Education ==
Lim-Sylianco received an associate degree for the pre-medicine program at Silliman University in 1947. However, she switched out of the Medicine track shortly after to pursue a bachelor's degree in chemistry, where she graduated as magna cum laude in 1949. Lim-Sylianco then pursued a master's in Chemistry at University of the Philippines in 1949. There, she worked as a research assistant until 1951 and later took on an instructor role until she graduated in 1953. After receiving a Fulbright scholarship, she went to the United States to pursue her doctoral studies in biochemistry and organic chemistry at the University of Iowa. She was a research assistant in the university's Department of Pediatrics from 1953 to 1955 and a research fellow in the Department of Biochemistry from 1955 to 1957.

== Career and research ==
Lim-Sylianco moved back to teach at the chemistry and biochemistry departments of the University of the Philippines in 1957. From 1970 to 1973, she served as a consultant for the National Institute of Science and Technology. Lim-Sylianco was a prolific researcher, making contributions to several fields such as environmental mutagens and anti-mutagens, biochemical nutrition, bioorganic mechanisms, and mutagenicity of Philippine medical plants (trilaurin, trilinolein, etc.). In 1989, she became a member of the International Advisory Committee on Anti-mutagens. She was also dedicated to chemical education and wrote textbooks on organic chemistry and molecular biochemistry that were adopted nationally. These include: Principle of Organic Chemistry, 5th ed., 1975; Modern Biochemistry, 1976; Monograph Series on Molecular Biochemistry: Nucleic Acids, Protein, Carbohydrates, Lipids, 1974; Laboratory Manual in Organic Chemistry, 1965; and Laboratory Manual in Biochemistry, 1961.

== Awards and recognition ==
In 1958, she became a Fellow of the Royal Society.

In 1977, she received the Gregario Y. Zara Award.

From 1974 to 1977, she was the University of the Philippines Endowment Professional Chair in Chemistry.

She was recognized as a National Scientist of the Philippines in 1994.
