= National Scientist of the Philippines =

Philippine order

Order of National Scientists
- Seal of the National Academy of Science and Technology, which appears on the collar bestowed on members.

Awarded by Philippines
- Type: Order
- Awarded for: Having made significant contributions to the development of Philippine sciences
- Status: Currently constituted
- Sovereign: President of the Philippines

Statistics
- First induction: 1978
- Last induction: 2024

Precedence
- Next (higher): Order of Gabriela Silang
- Next (lower): Gawad Mabini
- Equivalent: Order of National Artists, Order of National Social Scientists, Gawad sa Manlilikha ng Bayan, Order of Lakandula - Special Class of Champion for Life
- Ribbon bar of the order

The Order of National Scientists of the Philippines (Tagalog: Orden ng mga Pambansang Alagad ng Agham ng Pilipinas), abbreviated as ONS, is the highest award accorded to Filipino scientists by the Philippine government. Members of the order are known as National Scientists.

The award was created on December 16, 1976, by President Ferdinand Marcos through Presidential Decree Nos. 1003 and 1003-A, which also created the National Academy of Science and Technology. For the purposes of the law, a scientist is defined as "an individual who has earned a doctoral degree in any field of the sciences" and "has demonstrated and earned distinction in independent research or significant innovative achievement in the basic and applied sciences, including agricultural, engineering, and medical sciences, in mathematics and in the social sciences as manifested by published works in recognized scientific and technical journals." It was elevated to the status of order in 2003.

== Nomination and selection ==
It is the task of the National Academy of Science and Technology, which is composed of Filipino scientists, to recommend not more than 10 scientists annually to the president of the Philippines for conferment of the rank of National Scientist. The president makes the ultimate selection, which is based on "distinguished individual or collaborative achievement in science and technology."

== Benefits ==
Awardees are conferred the rank and title of National Scientist, with an accompanying medallion and citation. They are also given a financial gratuity with the amount determined by the National Academy. They are entitled to the same privileges enjoyed by National Artists of the Philippines, which include a monthly life pension, medical and hospitalization benefits, and a place of honor, in line with protocular precedence, at national state functions. They are likewise by law entitled upon death to a state funeral conducted by the National Academy and the Armed Forces of the Philippines, befitting their recognized status as heroes of the Philippines.

== Roster of National Scientists ==
Since 1978, 44 men and women have been designated as National Scientist in the roster; 11 of them are currently living. The most recent conferment was made to honor Romulo Davide. Honorees such as the Ramon Magsaysay Award recipient pediatrician Fe del Mundo have garnered international recognition.

As of August 2024, the National Scientists of the Philippines are:

President	Year	National Scientist	Province	Division	Field
Ferdinand Marcos	1978	Juan Salcedo, Jr.	Manila	Health Sciences	Nutrition and public health
Ferdinand Marcos	1978	Alfredo C. Santos	Pampanga	Mathematical and Physical Sciences	Physical chemistry
Ferdinand Marcos	1978	Gregorio Y. Zara	Batangas	Engineering Sciences and Technology	Engineering and inventions
Ferdinand Marcos	1980	Fe Del Mundo	Manila	Health	Pediatrics
Ferdinand Marcos	1980	Eduardo Quisumbing	Laguna	Biological Sciences	Plant taxonomy, systematics, and morphology
Ferdinand Marcos	1982	Geminiano T. de Ocampo	Bulacan	Health Science	Ophthalmology
Ferdinand Marcos	1982	Casimiro del Rosario	Cebu	Mathematical and Physical Science	Physics, astronomy, and meteorology
Ferdinand Marcos	1982	Gregorio Velasquez	Bulacan	Agricultural Sciences	Phycology
Ferdinand Marcos	1983	Francisco Fronda	Nueva Ecija	Agricultural Science	Animal husbandry
Ferdinand Marcos	1983	Francisco Santos	Bulacan	Health Sciences	Human nutrition and agricultural chemistry
Ferdinand Marcos	1983	Carmen Velasquez	Pangasinan	Agricultural Sciences	Parasitology
Ferdinand Marcos	1985	Teodoro Agoncillo (Note: Posthumous award)	Batangas	Social Sciences	Philippine history
Ferdinand Marcos	1985	Encarnacion Alzona	Laguna	Social Sciences	Philippine history
Ferdinand Marcos	1985	Hilario Lara	Cavite	Health Sciences	Public health
Corazon Aquino	1986	Julian Banzon	Bataan	Mathematical and Physical Sciences	Chemistry
Corazon Aquino	1986	Dioscoro L. Umali	Laguna	Agricultural Sciences	Agriculture and rural development
Corazon Aquino	1987	Jose Encarnacion, Jr.	Manila	Social Sciences	Economics
Corazon Aquino	1987	Luz Oliveros-Belardo	Rizal	Mathematical and Physical Sciences	Phytochemistry
Corazon Aquino	1988	Alfredo Lagmay	Manila and Ilocos Norte	Social Sciences	Experimental psychology
Corazon Aquino	1989	Paulo Campos	Cavite	Health Sciences	Nuclear medicine
Fidel V. Ramos	1994	Pedro Escuro	Camarines Sur	Agricultural Sciences	Genetics and plant breeding
Fidel V. Ramos	1994	Clara Lim-Sylianco	Negros Oriental	Mathematical and Physical Sciences	Biochemistry and organic chemistry
Fidel V. Ramos	1998	Dolores Ramirez	Laguna	Agricultural Sciences	Biochemical genetics & cytogenetics
Fidel V. Ramos	1998	Jose R. Velasco	Cavite	Agricultural Sciences	Plant physiology
Joseph Estrada	1999	Gelia T. Castillo	Laguna	Social Sciences	Rural sociology
Joseph Estrada	2000	Bienvenido Juliano	Laguna	Mathematical and Physical Sciences	Biochemistry
Gloria Macapagal Arroyo	2001	Clare Baltazar	La Union	Biological Sciences	Systematic entomology
Gloria Macapagal Arroyo	2001	Benito Vergara	Manila	Agricultural Sciences	Plant physiology
Gloria Macapagal Arroyo	2004	Onofre Corpuz	Tarlac	Social Sciences	Political economics and government
Gloria Macapagal Arroyo	2005	Ricardo Lantican	Laguna	Agricultural Sciences	Plant breeding
Gloria Macapagal Arroyo	2006	Lourdes Cruz	Cavite	Mathematical and Physical Science	Biochemistry
Gloria Macapagal Arroyo	2008	Teodulo Topacio, Jr.	Manila	Agricultural Sciences	Veterinary medicine
Gloria Macapagal Arroyo	2010	Mercedes Concepcion	Manila	Social Sciences	Demography
Gloria Macapagal Arroyo	2010	Ernesto Domingo	Manila	Health Sciences	Internal medicine / gastroenterology
Gloria Macapagal Arroyo	2010	Perla Santos Ocampo	Pangasinan	Health Sciences	Pediatrics
Benigno Aquino III	2011	Raul Fabella	Negros Occidental	Social Sciences	Economics
Benigno Aquino III	2011	Bienvenido Nebres	Benguet	Mathematical and Physical Sciences	Mathematics
Benigno Aquino III	2014	Angel Alcala	Negros Occidental	Biological Sciences	Biological sciences
Benigno Aquino III	2014	Ramon Barba	Ilocos Norte	Agricultural Sciences	Horticulture
Benigno Aquino III	2014	Edgardo Gomez	Manila	Biological Sciences	Marine biology
Benigno Aquino III	2014	Gavino Trono	Negros Occidental	Biological Science	Marine biology
Rodrigo Duterte	2019	Emil Javier	Laguna	Biological Science	Plant breeding
Bongbong Marcos	2023	Carmencita Padilla	Manila	Health Sciences	Medical genetics, pediatrics
Bongbong Marcos	2024	Romulo Davide	Cebu	Agricultural Sciences	Plant pathology and nematology

== See also ==
- National Scientist of the Republic of Korea

== Bibliography ==
- National Scientists of the Philippines (1978–1998). Pasig, Philippines: Anvil Publishing, Inc. 2000. ISBN 978-9712709326.
