= Rodolfo Cabangbang =

Filipino agronomist

- Awards: Outstanding Young Scientist of the National Academy of Science and Technology
- Scientific career
- Fields: agronomy
- Institutions: University of the Philippines Los Baños; Southeast Asian Regional Center for Graduate Study and Research in Agriculture

Rodolfo P. Cabangbang was a Filipino agronomist. He was a fellow of the Southeast Asian Regional Center for Graduate Study and Research in Agriculture at the University of the Philippines in Los Baños in the province of Laguna. He previously taught in the department of agronomy of the university. In 1982 he was named an Outstanding Young Scientist by the National Academy of Science and Technology, for his work on the development of locally adapted varieties of cotton.
