= Lourdes J. Cruz =

Filipino biochemist

Lourdes J. Cruz ONS
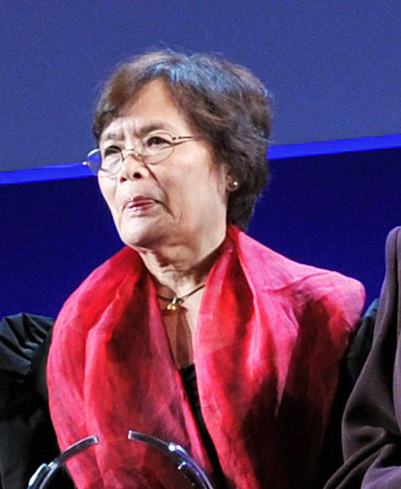
- Lourdes J. Cruz at the 2010 UNESCO-L’Oréal Prize for Women in Science Awards Ceremony at the UNESCO Headquarters, Paris.
- Born: Lourdes Jansuy Cruz; May 19, 1942 (age 84); Tanza, Cavite
- Education: University of the Philippines Diliman; University of Iowa
- Occupation: Biochemist
- Awards: Order of National Scientists of the Philippines (2006)

Lourdes J. Cruz (born May 19, 1942) is a Filipino biochemist whose research has contributed to the understanding of the biochemistry of toxic peptides from the venom of fish-hunting Conus marine snails. Throughout the Philippines, she is known as the Sea Snail Venom Specialist. The characterization of over 50 biologically active peptides from the snail's venom had been made possible, in part, by her studies. Scientific findings regarding the peptides found in snails have applications in diagnostic tools for cancers and the development of drugs for the treatment of neurological disorders. She has also contributed to the development of conotoxins as tools for examining the activity of the human brain. Her contributions to science have earned her several awards and acknowledgements including being named a National Scientist of the Philippines in 2006.

== Life and education ==
Cruz was born on May 19, 1942, in Tanza, Cavite. Cruz received her undergraduate degree in chemistry from the University of the Philippines Diliman in 1962 where she researched trypsin inhibitors. She later traveled to the United States to receive her master's and doctorate in biochemistry from University of Iowa in 1966 and 1968 respectively. Cruz worked at the International Rice Research Institute after completing both undergraduate and graduate degrees. She also completed a five-month postdoctoral position at Kansas State University.

== Research ==
Cruz has published over 130 academic papers and has a prolific career in research. In 1970, Cruz worked as an assistant professor at the University of the Philippines College of Medicine. She began her research on Conus geographus, a venomous fish-hunting cone snail found in the waters of Marinduque and Mindoro of the Philippines whose sting can result in death in humans. Her work focused on the isolation of peptides from the conotoxins in the snail's venom during a time their effects were still unknown. Her research shed light on the effects of conotoxins on the central nervous system and their connection to muscular paralysis, drowsiness, involuntary motion and motor function. Today, conotoxin peptides are used extensively in biochemical probes. For example, two classes of conotoxins are used as analytical agents: ω-conotoxin has been widely used for studying neuronal calcium channels and μ-conotoxin has been used when controlling muscular activity to observe events at the synapse.

Cruz has also pursued research in connecting science and technology to poor and indigenous rural communities. In 2001, she launched an initiative called the Rural LINC Program which allowed indigenous women in the Philippines to work at a fruit-processing plant in order to combat poverty. Additionally, she currently serves as the project leader for the Future Earth Philippines Program, an effort to reduce unsustainable practices like deforestation, coral reef degradation, pollution, and irresponsible mining and agriculture in the Philippines.

== Awards ==
Awards won include:

- NAST Outstanding Young Scientist Award, (1981)
- NRCP Achievement Award in Chemistry (1982)
- L'Oréal-UNESCO Award for Women in Science (2010)
- Outstanding Women in the Nation's Services Award - TOWNS Foundation and Lions Club (1986)
- Academician - National Academy of Science and Technology (1987)
- Professional Achievement Award in Biochemistry - University of the Philippines Alumni Association (1991)
- Sven Brohult Award - International Foundation Science (1993)
- Medal of Distinction (research) - Philippine Society for Biochemistry and Molecular Biology (1994)
- Outstanding Alumnus - University of the Philippines Chemistry Alumni Foundation (1996)
- Gregorio Y. Zara Award in Basic Science - Philippine Association for Advancement of Science (2000)
- Service Award - Philippine Society for Biochemistry and Molecular Biology (2001)
- Outstanding ASEAN Scientist and Technologist Award (2001)
- Gawad Chancellor Award for Research (2002)
- Proclaimed as National Scientists - President of the Republic of the Philippines (2006)
