= National Academy of Science and Technology Awards =

National Academy of Science and Technology recognizes worthy contributions of Filipino scientists in the advancement of science and technology in the country during its Annual Scientific Meeting. It includes the following recognitions: Outstanding Young Scientists (OYS), The World Academy of Sciences for Developing Countries (TWAS) Prize for Young Scientists in the Philippines, NAST Talent Search for Young Scientists, NAST Environmental Science Award, NAST-LELEDFI Award for Outstanding Research in Tropical Medicine, Outstanding Scientific Papers, Outstanding Books and Outstanding Monographs.

== Outstanding Young Scientists ==
The Outstanding Young Scientists (OYS) is given to young Filipino scientist (younger than 41 years old) who have made significant contributions to science. Recipients include Rodolfo Cabangbang, agronomist, 1982.

== The World Academy of Sciences for Developing Countries (TWAS) Prize for Young Scientists in the Philippines ==
The TWAS Prize for Young Scientist is given to outstanding young Filipino scientists (must not be 41 years) by the NAST in the fields of Biology, Chemistry, Mathematics, or Physics.

| Year | Field | Name | Rationale |
|---|---|---|---|
| 2014 | Mycology (Biology) | Thomas Edison E. dela Cruz, Dr. Rer. Nat | "for his important research on the biodiversity and ecological patterns of marine and mangrove fungi, fungal endophytes, macrofungi, and fruticoselichens." |
| 2014 | Genetics (Biology) | Ian Kendrich C. Fontanilla, Ph.D. | "for his significant contributions to the pioneering DNA barcoding studies" |
| 2013 | Physics | Raphael A. Guererro, Ph.D. | "in recognition of his research on volume holographic storage and animation" |

== NAST Environmental Science Award ==
| Year | Name | Affiliation | Rationale |
|---|---|---|---|
| 2014 | Damasa Magcale-Macandog, Ph.D. | University of the Philippines Los Baños | "for her exemplary research program that addressed the environmental issues and problems of the Laguna Lake ecosystem" |

== NAST-LELEDFI Award for Outstanding Research in Tropical Medicine ==
| Year | Name | Affiliation | Study |
|---|---|---|---|
| 2013 | Vicente Y. Belizario Jr., M.D. | National Institutes of Health | Sentinel surveillance of soil-transmitted helminthiasis in preschool-age and school-age children in selected local government units in the Philippines: Follow-up assessment |

== NAST Talent Search for Young Scientist ==
| Year | Prize | Name | Affiliation | Outstanding scientific and technology contribution entitled: |
|---|---|---|---|---|
| 2015 | First Prize | Drandreb Earl O. Juanico, Ph.D. | Technological Institute of the Philippines | Epidemic cycle induced by intervention in a susceptibility-structured population |
| 2015 | Second Prize | Charlotte Kendra D.Z. Gotangco, Ph.D. | Ateneo de Manila | A sensitivity analysis of surface biophysical, carbon, and climate impacts of tropical deforestation rates in CCSM4-CNDV |
| 2015 | Third Prize | Romar B. dela Cruz, Ph.D. | University of the Philippines Diliman | Cheating-immune secret schemes from codes and cumulative arrays |
| 2015 | Special Citation | Rose Ann G. Franco, M.S. | University of the Philippines Los Baños | Utilization of polyvinylphosphonic acid (PVPA) and its effect on the material properties and biocompatibility of polyvinyl alcohol (PVA) electrospun membranes |
| 2015 | Special Citation | Pierangeli G. Vital, Ph.D. | University of the Philippines Diliman | Microbiology quality of fresh produce from open air markets and supermarkets in the Philippines |
| 2014 | First Prize | Angel B. Encarnacion, Ph.D. | Bureau of Fisheries and Aquatic Resources | Application of ergothioneine-rich extract from an edible mushroom (Flammulina velutipes) for melanosis prevention in shrimp, (Penaeus monodon and Letopenaeus vannamei) |
| 2013 | First Prize | Aaron Joseph L. Villaraza, Ph.D. | University of the Philippines Diliman | Macromolecules, dendrimers and nanomaterials in magnetic resonance imaging: The interplay between size, function and pharmacokinetics |
| 2013 | Second Prize | Manuel Joseph C. Loquias, Dr.math. | University of the Philippines Diliman | Coincidence isometries of a shifted square lattice |
| 2013 | Third Prize | Allan Patrick G. Macabeo, D.Nat.Sci. | University of Santo Tomas | Stereoslective routes to aryl-substituted y-butyrolactones and their applications towards the synthesis of highly oxidised furanocembranoids |

== Other NAST Awards ==
- Outstanding Book or Monograph Award: given to books and/or monographs written by a majority of Filipino authors and published by Filipino publishers based in the Philippines within five years preceding the award.
- Outstanding Scientific Paper Award: given to outstanding scientific papers published in Philippine scientific or technical journals within five years preceding the award.
