= Luz Oliveros-Belardo =

Filipina pharmaceutical chemist (1906–1999)

Luz Oliveros-Belardo ONS
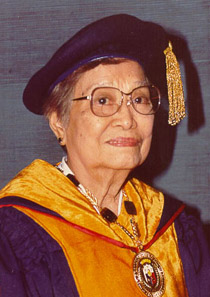
- Official portrait, National Academy of Science and Technology
- Born: Luz Belarmino Oliveros; November 3, 1906; Navotas, Rizal, Philippine Islands
- Died: December 12, 1999 (aged 93)
- Resting place: Libingan ng mga Bayani
- Education: University of the Philippines Manila (BS, MS); University of Connecticut (PhD)
- Occupation: Pharmaceutical chemist
- Spouse: Ricardo Belardo
- Children: 2
- Awards: Order of National Scientists of the Philippines (1987)

Luz Oliveros-Belardo (November 3, 1906 – December 12, 1999) was a Filipina pharmaceutical chemist, honored with the National Scientist of the Philippines award by the Philippine government in 1987.

== Early life ==
Luz Oliveros was born in Navotas, then a municipality of Rizal, to Aurelio Oliveros and Elisa Belarmino. She held undergraduate (Bachelor of Science in Pharmacy) and master's degrees in Pharmaceutical Chemistry from the University of the Philippines in Manila. In 1957, she earned a PhD in Pharmacy at the University of Connecticut, with a dissertation involving molecular refraction in terpenes.

== Career ==
Luz Oliveros-Belardo was director of the Natural Sciences Research Center at the Philippine Women's University. She became dean of the College of Pharmacy in 1947. Her research focused on extracting essential oils and other chemicals from native Philippine plants for pharmaceuticals, food production, scents, and other applications. For example, she developed an experimental formulation based on apitong (Dipterocarpus grandiflorus) oleoresin that was suitable for motor fuel.

In 1965–1966, she was named an AAUW fellow by the American Association of University Women to pursue her research at Stanford University. In 1974, the Philippine Association of University Women recognized her with their Achievement Award in Natural Science. She received the National Scientist Award in 1987.

Dr. Luz Oliveros-Belardo extracted 33 new Philippine essential oils from native plants and studied their chemical and physical properties. Her first research was on the chemical and pharmacological properties of Tanglad Tagalog (Cymbopogon ciratus) and found that its chemicals, such as potassium citrate that is an effective diuretic compound capable of resisting increased blood pressure. She was one of the first Southeast Asians that conducted studies on Chichirica (Vinca rosea) leaves and found that it is rich in alkaloids, glycosides, terpenoids, sterols, fatty acids, and volatile oil.

== Personal life ==
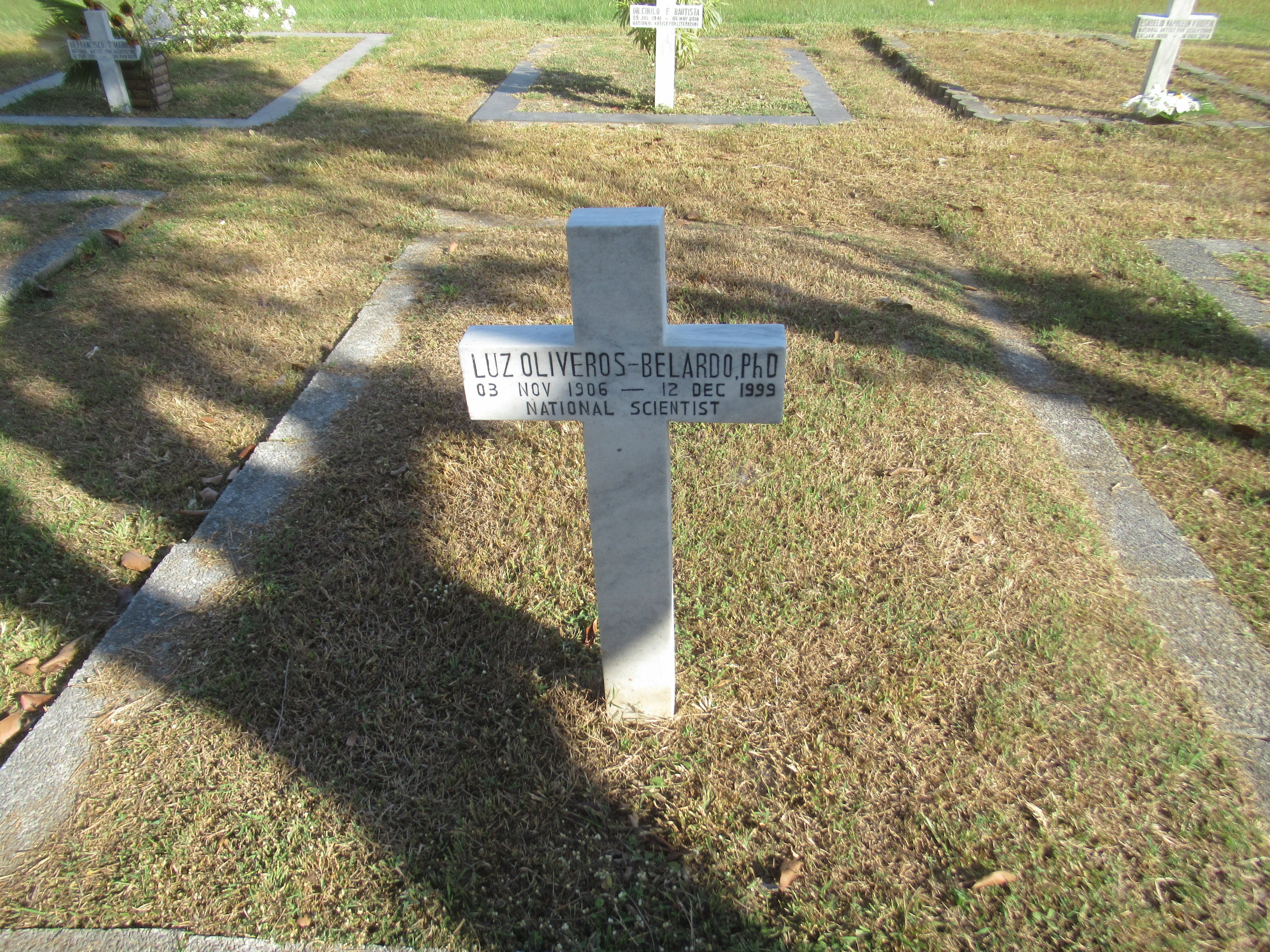
Oliveros-Belardo's grave at the Libingan ng mga Bayani.

Luz Oliveros married a dentist, Ricardo A. Belardo. They had two daughters. She died in 1999, aged 93 years. Her remains were buried at Libingan ng mga Bayani in Taguig.
