= Benito Vergara =

Filipino scientist (1934–2015)

Benito Vergara ONS
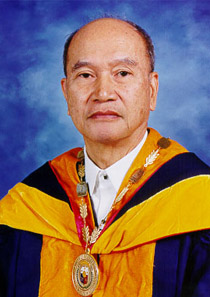
- Official portrait, National Academy of Science and Technology
- Born: Benito S. Vergara; June 23, 1934
- Died: October 24, 2015 (aged 81)
- Education: University of the Philippines Diliman; University of Hawaii at Manoa; University of Chicago
- Known for: Farmer's Primer on Growing Rice
- Spouse: Lina Manalo-Vergara
- Children: 3
- Awards: Order of National Scientists of the Philippines (2001)
- Scientific career
- Fields: Plant Science
- Workplaces: International Rice Research Institute

Benito S. Vergara (June 23, 1934 – October 24, 2015) was a scientist in the plant sciences, and was conferred the rank and title of National Scientist of the Philippines in 2001, the highest honor bestowed by the Philippine Government for the work of Filipino scientists. Vergara was also behind the development of the Rice Museum and Learning Center, and is known for his extensive plant catalogues in rice and ornamental plant varieties, as well as his work starting the Farmer's Primer on Growing Rice, an illustrated manual explaining basic rice growing concepts.

== Early life and education ==
Benito Vergara was born on June 23, 1934, to Jose Vergara, a medical doctor, and Luisa Sibug Vergara, a nurse. He was the youngest boy of eight children, and was raised primarily by his older sisters Betty, Lucy, and Belen Vergara who taught him household skills and chores.

In 1955, he attained his Bachelor's degree in Botany from the University of the Philippines Diliman as a pre-medicine major to become a medical doctor like his father. In his senior year at UP Diliman, Vergara was recommended to replace a friend who had backed out of an opportunity to pursue a master's degree in the University of Hawaii at Manoa to become a Jesuit priest. The opportunity to attain a master's degree abroad in place of his friend, was described by Vergara as a turning point in his life wherein his education led him to become a scientist instead of a medical doctor. After accepting the recommendation to go to UH Manoa, Vergara completed his Master's degree in Botany in 1959 before attending the University of Chicago for his PhD in Plant Sciences and completing it in 1960.

After his education, Vergara returned to the Philippines intending to join the UP faculty. Instead, he was asked by the International Rice Research Institute (IRRI) Director Robert Chandler, to help start the IRRI laboratory with Bienvenido Juliano, another scientist who will eventually be awarded National Scientist in 2000. The work at the IRRI would involve cataloguing, screening, and eventually breeding different varieties of rice. In 1961, Vergara joined the IRRI as an Associate Plant Physiologist in 1961.

== Work in the IRRI ==
Vergara and Juliano were given the task to build the IRRI laboratory from scratch as there were no research programs, gene bank, screening protocols, or other scientists involved. Vergara and Juliano were given blank checks to order laboratory equipment and supplies for the laboratory, before being joined by other scientists to set the research agenda for the plant physiology work at the institute. After starting the laboratory, Vergara became the head of the Plant Physiology Department and head of the Agronomy, Plant Physiology, and Agroecology Department until 1991. In 1992, he was promoted to Director for Administration until his retirement in 1996.

Vergara's work in the IRRI focused on three major research areas: the flowering response of rice to photoperiodism, rice physiology, and deep water rice.

== Literature publications ==
=== The farmer's primer on growing rice ===
While working in the IRRI and traveling to rice-growing countries, Vergara noticed that farmers and extension workers had difficulty with technical and scientific information about growing rice. Vergara identified the source of the problem to be the materials and language used to explain rice growing concepts. Due to this gap, Vergara collaborated with his student, Fred Bacorro, and created an illustrated manual on planting rice that would discuss concepts such as farm management, farm analysis, and improvement. In 1979, the first print run of Vergara's book The Farmer's Primer on Growing Rice was published as a commercial book. After the first print run, the IRRI took over publication of the primer in 1982. Since its publication, the primer has been translated into over 50 languages, and is in use around the world among agriculturists, extensions workers, and farmers.

=== Plant catalogue ===
After the publication of The Farmer's Primer on Growing Rice, Vergara continued to catalogue plants. He published a collection of catalogues that primarily focused on rice, before moving to ornamental plant varieties.

=== Children's literature on rice ===
Vergara led a children's book project called Gabby Ghas endorsed by the Department of Education. The goal of the book was to teach children the process of rice production from the planting stage to the feeding stage. The book centers around Gabby Ghas, a tiny grain of palay on a journey of self-discovery to feed a hungry boy. The book was written in 2009 by Virna Karla Sebastian, Erika Thea Ajes, and Aya Arce.

Gabby Ghas has won several awards conducted by the Asia Rice Foundation, the Alpha Phi Omega service sorority, and the Philippine Department of Education.

== Rice museum ==
During Vergara's last years at IRRI, Vergara developed a rice museum to educate the public on the science and culture of rice around the world. The Riceworld Museum and Learning Center was established in1994 in the University of the Philippines, Los Baños, Laguna and is the only museum and learning center in the world dedicated to rice and rice farmers around the world.

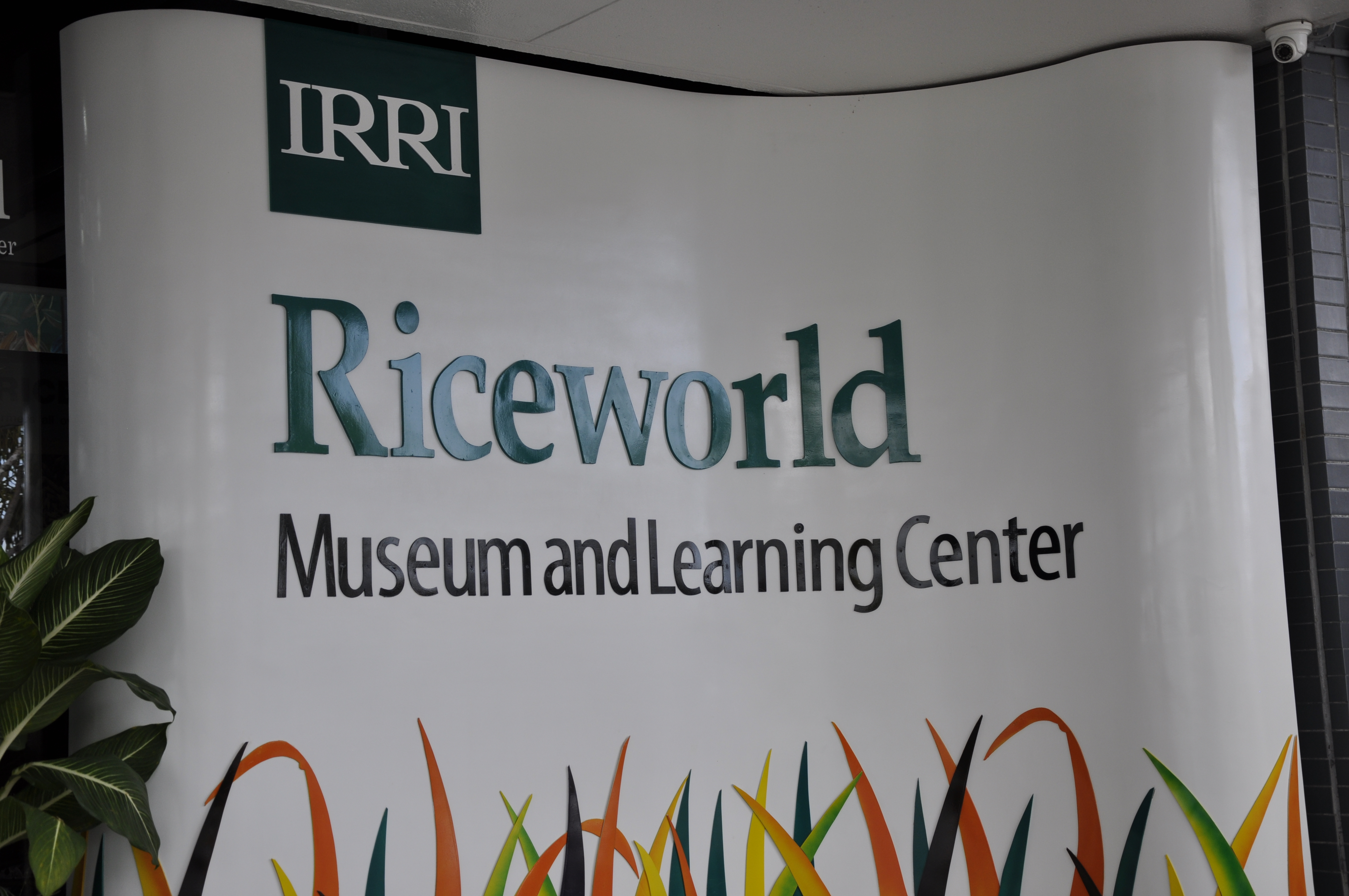
International Rice Research Institute's Riceworld Museum and Learning Center

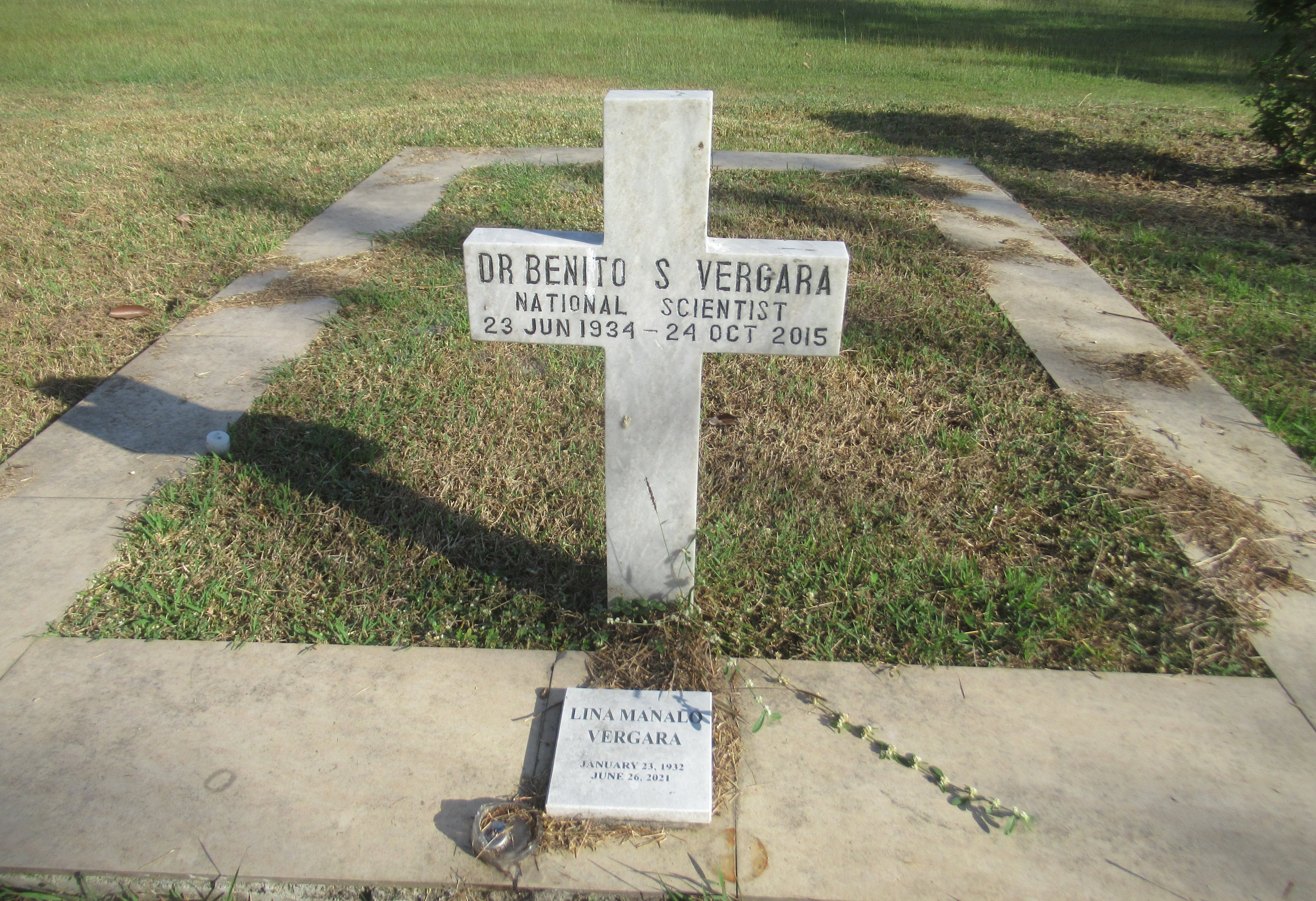
Vergara's grave at the Libingan ng mga Bayani.

== Later life and death ==
Vergara was married to Lina Manalo-Vergara, IRRI's first head librarian. He has two sons, Sunny and Happy Vergara, a daughter, Joy Vergara, and four grandchildren.

On October 24, 2015, at the age of 81, Vergara died of a heart attack.

== Other accomplishments ==
Vergara was a member of the Ornamental Team of the Philippines Council for Agriculture and Resource Research. He was also president of the Los Baños Orchid Society.

== Awards ==
Vergara won numerous awards for his scientific work, and work within his community. Awards include:

- Outstanding Young Man, 1961
- Outstanding Phi Sigman, 1977
- Outstanding Alumnus of the UP Botanical Society, 1986
- Academician to the National Academy of Science and Technology Philippines, 1987
- American Society of Agronomy Fellow, 1986
- National Scientist, 2001
- Outstanding Citizen of Los Baños, 2004
