= Ramon Barba =

Filipino inventor and horticulturist (1939–2021)

Ramon Barba ONS
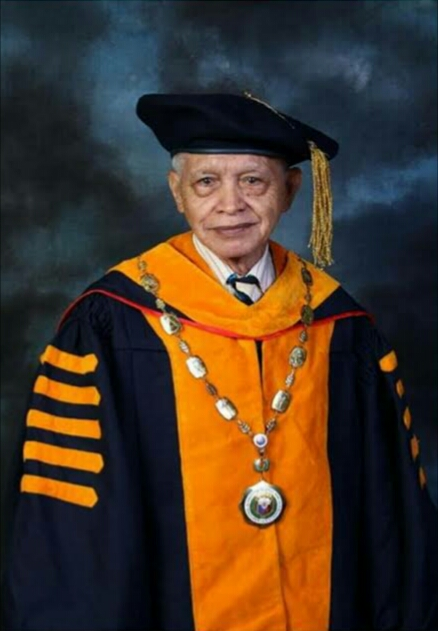
- Official portrait, National Academy of Science and Technology
- Born: August 31, 1939; San Nicolas, Ilocos Norte, Philippine Commonwealth
- Died: October 10, 2021 (aged 82)
- Education: University of the Philippines Los Baños; University of Georgia; University of Hawaii at Manoa
- Occupation: Horticulturist
- Awards: Order of National Scientists of the Philippines (2014)

Ramon Cabanos Barba ONS (August 31, 1939 – October 10, 2021) was a Filipino inventor and horticulturist best known for inventing a way to induce more flowers in mango trees using ethrel and potassium nitrate. Barba was proclaimed a National Scientist of the Philippines in June 2014.

== Early life and education ==
The son of Juan Madamba Barba and Lourdes Cabanos of San Nicolas, Ilocos Norte, Barba was born on August 31, 1939, the youngest of four siblings. He finished his elementary schooling at Sta. Rosa Academy in 1951. After high school, he went to the University of the Philippines, where orchid researcher Helen Layosa Valmayor became his biology laboratory instructor.

Barba then took up a Bachelor of Science course in agriculture at the University of the Philippines Los Baños, majoring in Agronomy and Fruit Production, eventually graduating in 1958. His grandfather, Juan Cabanos, was an official of the Bureau of Plants and Industry (BPI); his instructor, L.G. Gonzales, is considered the "father of Philippine horticulture."

== Career in horticulture ==
=== Graduate studies ===
Barba received a scholarship from the University of Georgia where he began conducting experiments on inducing the flowering of plants using gibberellic acid and potassium nitrate as a fertilizer. He graduated with distinction with a Master of Science in Horticulture from the university in 1962.

Barba then took up a PhD course in plant physiology, specializing in Tropical Fruits and Tissue Culture from the East-West Center of the University of Hawaii at Manoa, graduating in 1967.

=== Induction of flowering of the mango by chemical spray ===
There were initial objections to Barba's research proposals for inducing flowering in mango. He conducted experiments with help from his friends Jose and Rita Quimson of Quimara Farms in San Jose del Monte, Bulacan. Previously, mangoes were only available in the Philippines in May; owing to Barba's innovation as initially tested at Quimara Farms, mango trees can be induced to flower out of season using potassium nitrate and not only in May, which would lead to fruiting several times a year without harming the plants, drastically elevated the productivity of the mango farms. His study, titled Induction of Flowering of the Mango by Chemical Spray was named best paper by the Crop Science Society of the Philippines (CSSP) in 1974. Barba was recognized as one of the Ten Outstanding Young Men in Agriculture that same year.

In an interview released by the World Intellectual Property Organization in 2011, Barba recounts that he did not initially file a patent for his method, wanting farmers to be able to use the technique freely. Eventually, though, somebody else tried to patent the process, so Barba preemptively filed a patent application, choosing simply not to charge royalties for the use of his method.

In 2001, Barba also cautioned fruit farmers that "too much flower inducer spraying (is) bad for mangoes".

=== Other studies ===
Barba advanced the research on various tropical crops besides mangoes. His many research breakthroughs include banana micropropagation and tissue culture of sugarcane and tissue culture of calamansi, all of which have lasting impacts on the respective agribusiness potentials of these commodities.

== Awards ==
- 2014: National Scientist of the Philippines
- 2016: Asian Scientist 100, Asian Scientist

== Death ==
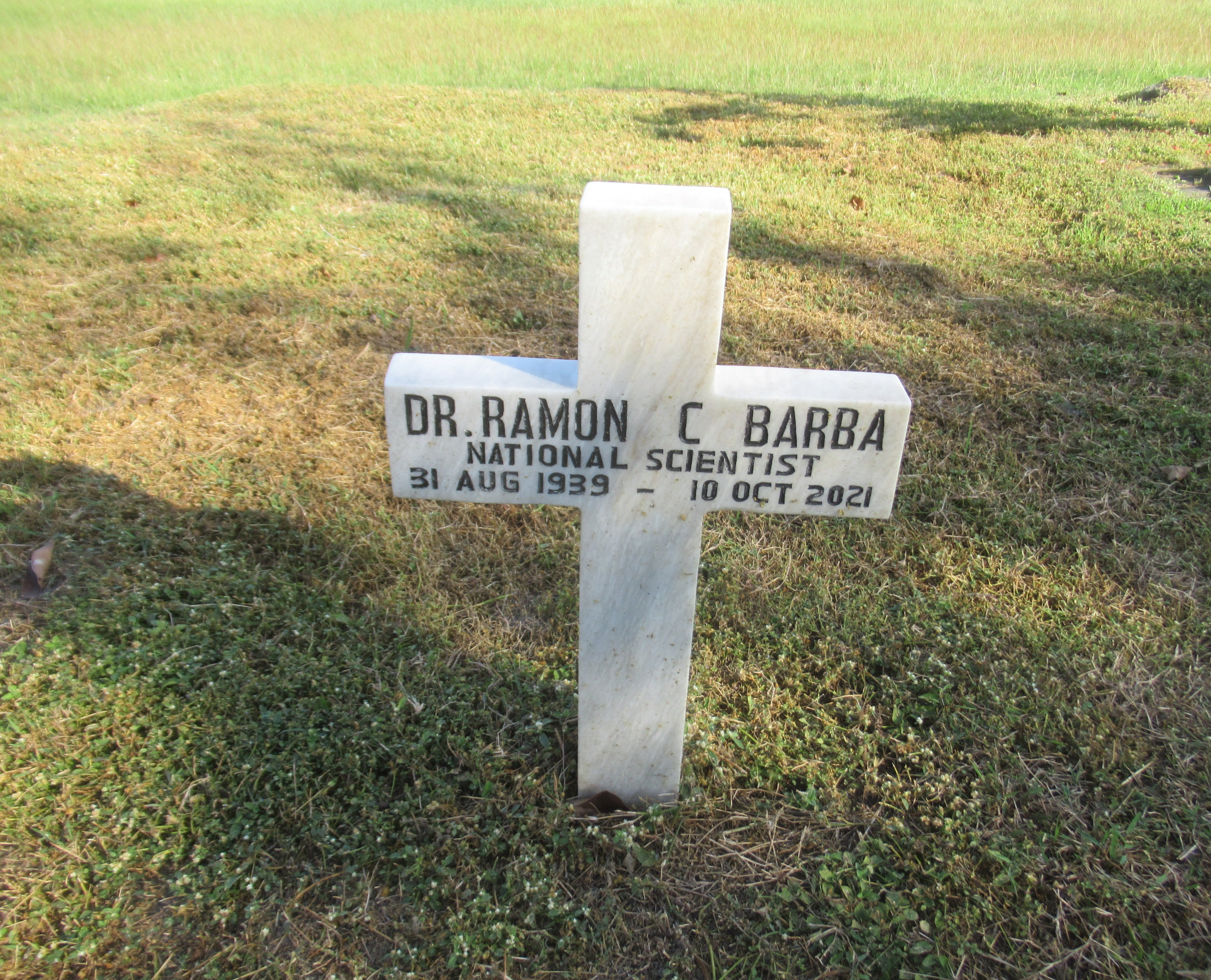
Barba's grave at the Libingan ng mga Bayani.

Barba died on October 10, 2021, at the age of 82. A state funeral was accorded to Barba, who was laid to rest at the Heroes’ Cemetery in Taguig on October 16.
