= Casimiro del Rosario =

Filipino scientist

Casimiro del Rosario ONS
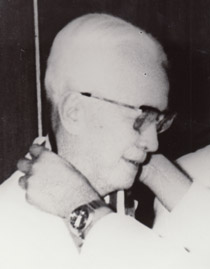
- Official portrait, National Academy of Science and Technology
- Born: Casimiro Villacin del Rosario; June 13, 1896; Bantayan, Cebu, Philippines
- Died: September 15, 1982 (aged 86)
- Education: University of the Philippines (B.A., 1915; B.S., 1918); Yale University (M.S., 1924); University of Pennsylvania (Ph.D., 1932)
- Awards: Order of National Scientists of the Philippines (1982)
- Scientific career
- Fields: Physics, Meteorology

Casimiro Villacin del Rosario (June 13, 1896 – September 15, 1982) was a Filipino scientist. He was named a national scientist in the Philippines in 1983 for being a pioneer in physics, meteorology, and astronomy in the Philippines. Del Rosario is recognized for his restoration of the war-damaged Philippine Observatory and for his leadership in establishing various observatories to study the changing times and galaxies. He was an officer of the World Meteorological Organization and led the establishment of the Philippine Science High School.

== Biography ==
On June 13, 1896, Del Rosario was born in Bantayan in the Philippine province of Cebu. His parents were Pantaleon del Rosario, a farmer, and Benita Villacin. Being four years old when he was in first grade, he went the University of the Philippines after graduating from the Cebu High School. He was nineteen when he completed his first undergraduate degree, a Bachelor of Arts from the University of the Philippines in 1915. He obtained another undergraduate degree in civil engineering from the same university in 1918. Del Rosario then taught his alma mater for some time, after which he left for the United States for further study. He completed his master's in physics at Yale University in 1924, topping his graduating class of 48 international students. During his time at Yale, he received the coveted Junior Sterling Research Fellowship and was also a roommate of Ernest O. Lawrence. In 1926, he was awarded a four-year fellowship by the Bartol Research Foundation in Philadelphia. He obtained his PhD in 1932 from Penn with the dissertation "Very Soft X-ray Spectra of Heavy Elements".

Due to the recognition of his published research by leading American physicists, del Rosario was offered to teach at the Howard University in Washington. He chose to go back to the Philippines and taught physics at the University of the Philippines. He was later appointed dean of this faculty and was one of the only two UP professors with a PhD in physics. At the outbreak of World War II in 1941, he joined the Weather Bureau and acted as the chief of the Astronomical Division. His wartime contributions to the guerrilla effort against the Japanese include the establishment of the Guerilla Weather Station in Bulacan's Victory Hill and building three reflecting telescopes with 9-inch and 1 2-inch apertures to help the guerrillas with their defensive tactics and reconnaissance efforts.

From 1946 to 1958, del Rosario was head of the Philippine Weather Bureau. He presided over the restoration of the status of the Philippine Observatory and also the restoration of the Philippine Astronomical Observatory. He also helped establish the Philippine Atmospheric, Geophysical and Astronomical Services Administration (PAGASA). He was the chairman of the Division of Physical and Mathematical Sciences of the National Research Council of the Philippines, and was the first vice-chairman and also executive director of the National Science Development Board, the forerunner of the Department of Science and Technology. From 1954 to 1957, del Rosario was an ex-officio member of the executive committee of the World Meteorological Organization (WMO) and was president of a regional association of the WMO, which included the Philippines, Australia, Indonesia, New Zealand among others.

As a scientist, one of del Rosario's major contributions to astrophysics was his research into ultra-violet light of different wavelengths, which required high vacuum photography. He also investigated ionizing radiation and its effects, electrical discharge in a high vacuum, and many others. He was also co-founder of the Bartol Research Foundation, which did pioneering research in physics. He received various awards for his work, such as the Presidential Award in 1965. He also received the University of the Philippines Alumni Award and was appointed National Scientist of the Philippines in 1982.

Del Rosario maintained his hobby of making telescopes in his retirement years. He was married to Esperanza Ouano, and he died in 1982 at the age of 86.

== Selected bibliography ==
- del Rosario, C.: The Effect of a Hydrogen Atmosphere on the Velocity Distribution Among Thermionic Electrons, Phys. Rev., 28, 4, 769, October 1926.
- del Rosario, C.: Low-pressure electric discharge in intense electric fields, Journal of the Franklin Institute, 203, No.2, 243–250, February 1927.
- del Rosario, C.: Low-pressure electric discharge, Journal of the Franklin Institute, 205, No.1, 103–111, January 1928.
- Swann, W.F.G., del Rosario, C.: The effect of radioactive radiations upon euglena, Journal of the Franklin Institute, 211, No.3, 303–318, March 1931.
- Swann, W.F.G., del Rosario, C.: The effect of certain monochromatic ultraviolet radiation on euglena cells, Journal of the Franklin Institute, 213, No.5, 549–560, May 1932.
- del Rosario, C.: Very Soft X-Ray Spectra of Heavy Elements, Phys. Rev., 41, 2, 136, July 1932.

== Sources ==
- National Historical Institute (1992), Filipinos in History, Vol III, Manila, NHI
- Carlos Quirino (1995) Who's who in Philippine history, Tahanan Books, Manila
