= Romulo Davide =

Filipino philanthropist and scientist

Romulo Davide ONS
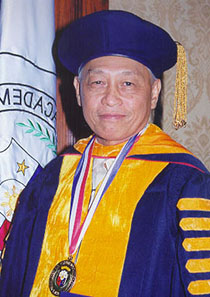
- Official portrait as Academician of the National Academy of Science and Technology
- Born: March 14, 1934 (age 92); Argao, Cebu
- Education: University of the Philippines Los Baños (B.S., 1957); Oklahoma State University (M.S., 1962); North Carolina State University (Ph.D., 1965)
- Spouse: Clara Lebumfacil
- Parents: Hilario P. Davide Sr. (father); Josefa L. Gelbolingo (mother)
- Relatives: Hilario Davide Jr. (Brother); Hilario Davide III (Nephew)
- Awards: Ramon Magsaysay Award (2012); Order of National Scientists of the Philippines (2024)
- Scientific career
- Fields: Nematology
- Workplaces: University of the Philippines Los Baños

Romulo Gelbolingo Davide (born March 14, 1934, in Argao, Cebu) is a Filipino philanthropist, scientist and farmers' advocate who is a recipient of the Ramon Magsaysay Award in 2012.

== Personal life ==
He is the older brother of Chief Justice Hilario G. Davide, Jr. and is the fifth of seven children. His father, Hilario Panerio Davide, was a school superintendent while his mother, Josefa Lopez Gelbolingo, was a public school teacher. He is married to Clara Lebumfacil, who is also a scientist. He is a member of the Upsilon Sigma Phi fraternity.

== Scientific career ==
He is regarded as the father of Nematology in the Philippines for his discovery of nematode-trapping fungi P. lilacinus and P. oxalicum leading to creating BIOCON, the first Philippine biological pesticide against nematode pests as a substitute to chemicals. Davide studied at the University of the Philippines Los Baños College of Agriculture in 1953-1957. He became a pioneer of the Farmer-Scientists RDE Training Program (FSTP), a program that trains marginal farmers to employ scientific methods in farming, and package and market their products effectively. Implemented countrywide in the Philippines, FSTP has lifted thousands of farmers from poverty to a new life of independence and affluence. He became professor emeritus of University of the Philippines Los Baños specializing in Plant Pathology and Nematology at the Plant Pathology Department of the College of Agriculture.

On August 8, 2024, Davide was proclaimed as a National Scientist of the Philippines by President Bongbong Marcos for his work in nematology and plant pathology.
