= Francisco O. Santos =

Filipino nutritionist and biochemist

Francisco O. Santos ONS
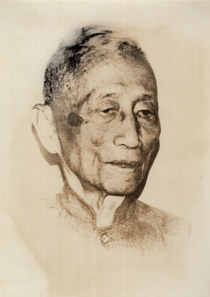
- Official Portrait, National Academy of Science and Technology
- Born: June 3, 1892; Calumpit, Bulacan, Philippines
- Died: February 19, 1983 (aged 90); Los Baños, Laguna, Philippines
- Education: University of the Philippines Manila; Yale University
- Awards: Order of National Scientists of the Philippines (1983)
- Scientific career
- Fields: Pharmaceutical Chemistry; Nutrition; Biochemistry
- Workplaces: University of the Philippines Los Baños

Francisco O. Santos (3 June 1892 – 19 February 1983) was a Filipino nutritionist and biochemist. His researches involved comprehensive investigations on the nutritional value of many Filipino foods. He was named a National Scientist of the Philippines in 1983 by President Ferdinand E. Marcos.

== Biography ==
Born in Calumpit, Bulacan on June 3, 1892, he obtained his medical bachelor's degree in 1912 and his master's degree in 1919 from the University of the Philippines Manila. He obtained his doctorate from Yale University in 1928. Santos became an instructor at University of the Philippines Los Baños. There, he became dean from 1945 to 1955. He also led the Institute of Nutrition in 1948. Santos stayed at the university for forty-five years.

He died on February 19, 1983 in Los Baños, Laguna.

== Research ==
Santos conducted studies on local nutritional problems. This include understanding rice diet and beriberi and analyzing the compositions of food materials.

In terms of food composition, Santos discovered that the properties found on sweet potatoes, including shoots and leaves, can help combat beriberi. He also studied the nutrients such as vitamin B and C found on local fruits. His researches, similar with the researches of Marciano Gutierrez, observed the effects of food income in diet. Studies led by Santos and Isabelo Concepcion concern the diets of athletes, students in government institutions, and army personnel.

Santos also advocated for subsistence farming or home gardening. He believed that this can be a financially-viable option than buying supermarket produce.

== Awards ==
In 1955, he received the Distinguished Service Medal due to his contribution in Philippine nutrition. In 1958, he received the Andres Soriano Award in chemistry. He was also named as an Academician by the National Academy of Science and Technology in 1980. He was posthumously awarded as a National Scientist of the Philippines shortly after his death in 1983.
