= Order of Gabriela Silang =

Philippine order

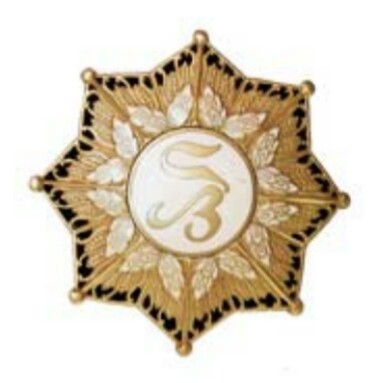
- Badge of the Order

Awarded by Philippines
- Type: Order
- Awarded for: Spouses of heads of State and/or of government
- Status: Currently constituted
- Sovereign: President of the Philippines
- Grades: Member

Precedence
- Next (higher): Order of Lakandula, Order of Sikatuna, Philippine Legion of Honor
- Next (lower): Order of National Artists, Order of National Scientists, Order of National Social Scientists, Gawad sa Manlilikha ng Bayan, Order of Lakandula - Special Class of Champion for Life
- Ribbon bar of the order

The Order of Gabriela Silang (Filipino: Orden ni Gabriela Silang) is an all-female order of the Philippines It is named after Philippine national heroine, Gabriela Silang.

== Award and Rank ==
The Order of Gabriela Silang is a single-class Order which may be conferred upon the spouses of heads of state and/or of government, both Filipino and foreign.

== Insignia ==
The ribbon of the order is red with yellow and blue borders.

== Recipients ==
- Elena Ceaușescu (April 9, 1975)
- Queen Alia al-Hussein of Jordan (March 1, 1976)
- Beatrix of the Netherlands (1979)
- Sirikit, Queen of Thailand
- Danielle Mitterrand (11 July 1989)
- Josephine Bongo, First Lady of the Republic of Gabon
- Queen Sofía of Spain (2 April 1995)):
- Empress Michiko of Japan (December 3, 2002)
- Laura Bush, First Lady of the United States of America (October 18, 2003)
- Luz Magsaysay, First Lady of the Philippines (21 August 2004)
- Aurora Quezon, First Lady of the Philippines (April 28, 2005)
- Victoria Syquia Quirino-Delgado, First Lady of the Philippines (5 December 2005)
- Empress Masako of Japan (May 27, 2026)

== See also ==
- List of awards honoring women
