= Alfredo Lagmay =

Filipino psychologist (1919–2005)

Alfredo Villagracia Lagmay ONS
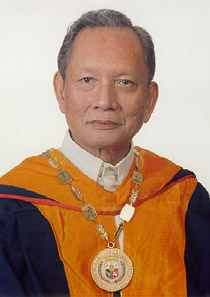
- Official portrait, National Academy of Science and Technology
- Born: August 14, 1919
- Died: December 15, 2005 (aged 86)
- Education: University of the Philippines Diliman; Harvard University
- Occupation: Psychologist
- Awards: Order of National Scientists of the Philippines (1988)

Alfredo Villagracia Lagmay (August 14, 1919 –December 15, 2005) was a respected Filipino psychologist and Professor Emeritus of Psychology at the University of the Philippines Diliman. He received his Ph.D. in psychology from Harvard University and trained under the psychologist and founder of the radical behaviorism movement B.F. Skinner.

He was conferred the distinction of National Scientist of the Philippines, the highest recognition given to Filipino scientists, in 1988. He is the father of University of the Philippines geology professor Mahar Lagmay.

== Biography ==
Lagmay was born on August 14, 1919, in Manila. His father was an immigrant from Ilocos who works in a pre-war gas company, Sacony. As a child whose family is struggling with poverty, he had a hobby of reading books and diligent study despite discouragement from family members. As a result of his diligent studying, he graduated Burgos Elementary School as a valedictorian.

Lagmay continued his education at Aurellio High School. He was an athletic individual as he was part of the 100-meter dash sports team in high school. He also became an athlete during his undergraduate years at the University of the Philippines Diliman (UP).

Due to his struggle from poverty, he sought for employment at UP. He worked with the Property Division of the UP administration. After a year, he worked with the Dean of Men's office and afterwards as a reception clerk to then UP President Bienvenido M. Gonzales. He worked on daytime and attend evening classes since 1939. During this time, he wanted to pursue a career in medicine but in 1941 changed his mind to pursue psychology.

He applied for undergraduate admission and scholarship to ten U.S. universities but two of them replied. However, World War II began and Lagmay had to delay his studies. After the war, he shifted to philosophy due to the lack of teachers in psychology at the time. In 1947, he received his bachelor's degree in Philosophy as cum laude. In UP Diliman, he also gained his master's degree in philosophy in 1951.

In 1955, Lagmay received his doctoral's degree in psychology at Harvard University.

== Researches ==
Lagmay's researches include experimental analysis of behavior, relaxation, hypnosis, and other related studies. As a graduate of Harvard in the 1950s, he worked with B.F. Skinner, over which he became a part of Skinner's research team in experimental psychology. Upon his return in the Philippines, he became officer-in-charge at the UP Psychology Department from 1955 to 1957. In 1964, he published his experiments conducted at Harvard. It was entitled "The Pacing of Behavior: A Technique for the Control of the Free Operant" published in the Natural and Applied Science Bulletin. His work was considered to be the first major scholarly contribution in scientific psychology in the Philippines.

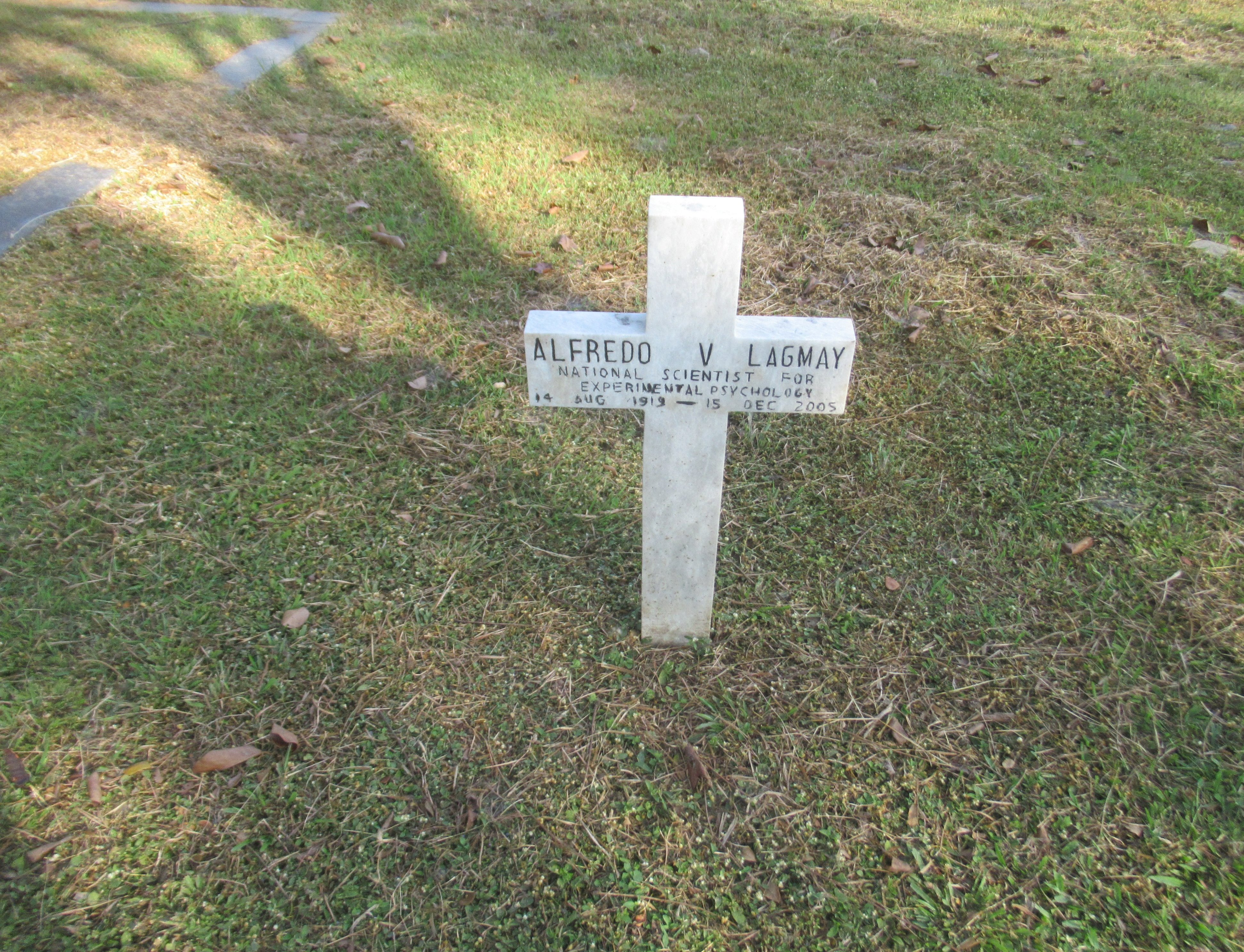
Lagmay's grave at the Libingan ng mga Bayani.

Lagmay made an article about the Filipino psychology of bahala na, which was first delivered at a psychology conference in 1976 and published in the Philippine Journal of Psychology. The article was a result of dissatisfaction by Lagmay to a 1968 article by Lynn Bostrom published in the Silliman Journal. Bostrom compared bahala na to American fatalism where she observed that the "bahala na" fatalistic attitude permeates within the daily lives of Filipinos and is more prevalent in the Philippines than in the United States. Her paper lacks empirical data and this led Lagmay to make a thematic apperception test conducted with 15 participants from Metro Manila. In Lagmay's article, he observed that the "bahala na" attitude does not avoid the problem but rather the person is committed to meeting the problem. He also brings importance about the improvisation or extemporization as the person is looking for ways to solve it.
