= Clare R. Baltazar =

Filipina entomologist (1927–2024)

Clare Baltazar ONS
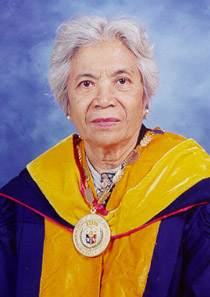
- Official portrait as National Scientist, National Academy of Science and Technology
- Born: Clare Rilloraza Baltazar; November 1, 1927; San Fernando, La Union, Philippine Islands
- Died: July 13, 2024 (aged 96); San Fernando, La Union, Philippines
- Resting place: Manila Memorial Park – Sucat
- Education: University of the Philippines (BSA); University of Wisconsin (MS, PhD)
- Awards: Order of National Scientists of the Philippines (2001)
- Scientific career
- Fields: Systematic entomology economic entomology

Clare Rilloraza Baltazar (November 1, 1927 – July 13, 2024) was a Filipina entomologist. She specialized in systematic entomology and economic entomology. Through her research on Philippine Hymenoptera, Baltazar discovered eight previously undescribed genera and 108 species of parasitic wasps. Her work on Hymenoptera was important to future biological pest control in the Philippines. She was named a National Scientist of the Philippines in 2001.

== Early life and education ==
Clare Rilloraza Baltazar was born on November 1, 1927, in San Fernando, La Union.

Baltazar began her studies at the University of the Philippines in 1943. She earned a BSA summa cum laude in entomology in 1947. She then studied economic entomology at the University of Wisconsin, earning an MS in 1950. She studied in the United States from 1955 to 1957 through a two-year fellowship from the Bureau of Plant Industry, Manila. She studied at N.C. State College before earning her PhD in systematic entomology from the University of Wisconsin in 1957.

== Career ==
Baltazar started a catalogue of Philippine Hymenoptera in 1950. During her studies in the United States from 1955 to 1957, she completed a large portion of the catalogue, which was published in 1966. In 1957, she received the first of two Guggenheim Fellowships for the preparation and publishing of the work. She conducted postdoctoral research at the Smithsonian Institution in 1965 and 1966 through the second fellowship. The 1966 monograph, A catalogue of Philippine Hymenoptera, included 235 entries for species of ants.

Through her research on Philippine Hymenoptera, Baltazar discovered eight previously undescribed genera, one subgenus, and 108 species of parasitic wasps. Her work on Hymenoptera was an important precursor to future biological pest control in the Philippines.

In 1979, she wrote Philippine Insects: An Introduction, the first authoritative textbook on insects of the Philippines.

== Death ==
Baltazar died in San Fernando, La Union on July 13, 2024, at the age of 96. A state necrological service was held for her at the DOST compound on July 18. This included a requiem mass presided by National Scientist Fr. Bienvenido Nebres. Her remains were accorded a state funeral and were buried in the Manila Memorial Park – Sucat.

== Awards and honours ==
Baltazar received the Jose Rizal Pro Patria Award from the President of the Philippines in 1980. In 1981, the Philippine Association of Entomologists presented her with the L. B. Uichanco Memorial Award for the Most Outstanding Entomologist. The alumni association of the University of the Philippines College of Agriculture granted her a Distinguished Alumnus Award in 1984. A hybrid of Hibiscus rosa-sinensis was named for her in 2000, Hibiscus rosa-sinensis 'Clare R. Baltazar'.

She was named a National Scientist of the Philippines in 2001.

== Described taxa ==
Baltazar described 108 species of parasitic wasps endemic to the Philippines. She also described the following genera:

- Barthasis (1972)
- Hybomischos (1961)
- Hypsotypos (1963)
- Ischnobracon (1963)
- Pachymelos (1961)
- Millironia (1964)
- Sychnostigma (1961)
- Triancyra (1961)

== Selected publications ==
- Baltazar, C.R. (1961). "New generic synonyms in parasitic Hymenoptera". Philippine Journal of Science. 90 (3): 391–395.
- Baltazar, Clare R. (15 March 1964). "The genera of parasitic Hymenoptera in the Philippines, Part 2" (PDF). Pacific Insects. 6 (1): 15–67.
- Baltazar, C.R. (1964). "Import and export of biological control agents in the Philippines (1850-1960)". Philippine Journal of Agriculture. 28 (1–2): 1–30.
- Baltazar, C. R. (1966). "A catalogue of Philippine Hymenoptera (with a bibliography, 1758-1963)". Pacific Insects Monograph. 8: 1–488.
- Baltazar, Clare R. "Reclassification of some Indo-Australian and African Braconinae and Rogadinae (Braconidae, Hymenoptera)". Philippine Journal of Science. 98 (1969): 259–277.
- Alba, Melanie C.; Baltazar, C.R. (1987). "Trichogrammatids in the Philippines". Philippine Entomologist. 7 (3): 253.
