= Mercedes Concepcion =

Filipino social scientist

Mercedes B. Concepcion ONS
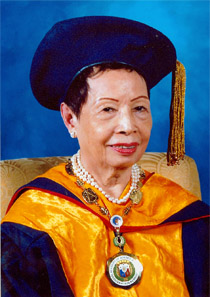
- Official portrait, National Academy of Science and Technology
- Born: June 10, 1928 (age 98)
- Education: University of the Philippines (B.S., 1951); University of Sydney (Certificate, 1954); University of Chicago (Ph.D., 1963)
- Occupation: Social Scientist
- Known for: Demography; Statistics; Sociology
- Awards: Order of National Scientists of the Philippines (2010)

Mercedes B. Concepcion (born June 10, 1928) is a Filipino social scientist who was named a National Scientist of the Philippines in 2010. Concepcion was also dubbed the "Mother of Asian Demography" because of her contributions in population studies and policy within the region. In 2002, she was named the "First Filipino Demographer" by the Philippine American Foundation. A few years later, she won the 2005 United Nations Population Award for her outstanding work in population studies on social and economic development, urbanization, and public health and welfare. Concepcion is currently the Vice President of the Executive Council of the National Academy of Science and Technology (NAST) and is a Trustee for both the Philippine Center for Population and Development (PCPD) and Foundation for Adolescent Development, among several other roles.

== Education ==
Concepcion earned her bachelor's degree in Chemistry at the University of the Philippines in 1951. From 1953 to 1954, she studied Biostatistics at the University of Sydney School of Hygiene and Public Health under the Colombo Plan Fellowship. Years later, she received another fellowship from the Population Council of New York to pursue a Ph.D. in Sociology from the University of Chicago.

== Career and research ==
Shortly following her studies at the University of Sydney, Concepcion returned to the Philippines in 1955 to become first Filipino staff member of the United Nations Statistical Training Centre at the University of the Philippines. After finishing up her Ph.D. at the University of Chicago, she returned to the Philippines again to serve multiple leadership roles. She was member and chairperson of the Preparatory Committees for the Asian Population Conferences of 1963, 1972, 1984, and 1994. Concepcion also worked with the Vatican as one of the two Asian members of the Birth Control Commission in 1964. This commission led to the formation of the famous encyclical Humanae Vitae in 1968. She also became the first Director of the newly established UP Population Institute (UPPI) in 1964. In 1967, she was the first and sole Philippine Representative to the United Nations (UN) Population Commission. In addition, Concepcion was the first Woman to chair this UN Population Commission from 1969 to 1977, and the first Asian woman to be elected President of the International Union for the Scientific Study of Population in 1981-1985.

In the late 1970s and early 1980s, she headed the Organization of Demographic Associates (ODA) composed of population institutes in Asia. Here, she implemented research studies on migration, urbanization, the elderly, and population and development issues. She also chaired the Steering Committee on the Social and Psychological Determinants of Fertility Regulation of the World Health Organization. This Committee reviewed research and action program proposals for funding.

In 1986, Concepcion chaired the Committee to Review the Philippine Statistical System. Approximately twenty years later, she was again appointed to the Committee to Review the Philippine Statistical System which recommended legislation for setting up the Philippine Statistics Authority which was passed into law on 31 October 2013. Her reviews led to the creation of the National Statistical Coordination Board as well as the reorganization of agencies such as the National Statistics Office, Statistical Research and Training Center, Bureau of Agricultural Statistics, and Bureau of Labor and Employment Statistics.

Concepcion was also involved with different social science organizations. She was one of the founding members of the Philippine Social Science Council and served as its first chairperson. She remains an active member of the Philippine Sociological Society, Philippine Statistical Association, and Philippine Population Association.

Adding to the list of roles, Concepcion has also served as a consultant for several international organizations such as the United Nations Population Fund, the UN Development Fund, the UN Statistical Office, the UN Training and Research Institute for the Advancement of Women, and the Economic and Social Commission for Asia and the Pacific.

== Awards and recognition ==
In 2002, Concepcion was named the "First Filipino Demographer" by the Philippine American Foundation.

In 2005, she won the United Nations Population Award for work in population studies on social and economic development, urbanization, and public health and welfare.

In 2010, she was bestowed the honor of "National Scientist of the Philippines " according Proclamation No. 1980 signed by President Gloria Macapagal Arroyo.
