= José Encarnación Jr. =

Filipino economist and academic (1928–1998)

José Encarnación Jr. ONS
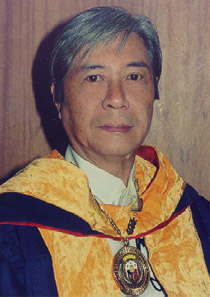
- Official portrait, National Academy of Science and Technology
- Born: José Concepcion Encarnación Jr. November 17, 1928; Manila, Philippines
- Died: July 5, 1998 (aged 69); Quezon City, Philippines
- Education: University of the Philippines Diliman; Princeton University
- Occupation: Economist
- Awards: Order of National Scientists of the Philippines (1987)

José Concepcion Encarnación Jr. (November 17, 1928 – July 5, 1998) was a Filipino professor of economics at the University of the Philippines Diliman, where he served as dean of the School of Economics from 1974 until his retirement in 1994.

== Education ==
Encarnación was educated at UP Diliman (PhB, MA Philosophy) and at Princeton University (PhD Economics). He was a fellow of the Upsilon Sigma Phi fraternity. At Princeton he was a student and dissertation advisee of William J. Baumol. The only Filipino economist of his generation to work in the field of theory, Encarnación was best known for advancing the theory of lexicographic preferences, which in the words of Richard Day, Encarnación "almost singlehandedly kept alive". In 1963, he was accorded as a member of the Ten Outstanding Young Men (TOYM) Awardee for Economics.

In 1987, he was named National Scientist, the highest recognition of scientific achievement given by the Republic of the Philippines. In 2008, the main building of the School of Economics at the University of the Philippines was renamed Encarnación Hall in his honor.

== Major contributions ==
=== Lexicographic preferences ===
Lexicographic preferences map a set of alternatives X onto a set of vectors, for which reason lexicographic preferences are also known as vector-valued preferences. (A mapping onto the set of real numbers instead yields real-valued utility.) Formally one posits a mapping V: X→ R^{n}, where n refers to the arbitrarily many or few dimensions of the vector and corresponds to the number of criteria of choice. Hence, let the vector v(x) = [v_{1}(x), v_{2}(x),...] represent the scores v_{i}(x) of an alternative x on various characteristics or criteria i = 1,2,...., arranged in decreasing order of importance. Define v(y) similarly. Then x is better than y if the first nonzero component of the vector difference v(x)- v(y) is positive. The term lexicographic refers to the fact that dictionaries similarly order words by their successive components, i.e. letters.

=== L*-ordering ===
One disadvantage of simple lexicographic ordering as described above is that subsequent criteria come into consideration only when the objects being compared are tied with respect to the preceding criteria. For example, in choosing a restaurant, price, cuisine quality, and ambience may be considerations, in decreasing order. Under simple lexicographic ordering, among all restaurants with the same price, those with the best cuisine would be preferred. And among those with the same price and the same quality of cuisine, the one with the best ambience would be chosen. These further criteria would be irrelevant, however, if there was a unique restaurant with the lowest price, since this one would always be preferred to more expensive ones, no matter how bad their cuisine or ambience. This is the implication of making price the first criterion.

Such a prediction is obviously unrealistic, however, and it is closer to experience to say that people have minimum acceptable levels or "thresholds" for certain criteria. The process of selecting a restaurant, for example, involves a continual process of narrowing down one’s choice by the application of successive criteria. First, restaurants where a meal per head does not exceed a certain price; from among those that pass that criterion, those whose quality of cuisine falls no lower than a specified level; then finally from those that pass the two previous criteria, those whose atmosphere is best.

It is this process that Encarnación formalized in 1964. If u_{i}(x) represents the degree of achievement in criterion i when in possession of x, a threshold level u_{i}* may be defined corresponding to a satisficing or satisfactory level of that criterion. The novel idea is that further increases in the value of u_{i} beyond u_{i}* do not matter. The importance of an alternative x with respect to the ith criterion may then be written as v_{i}(x) = min(u_{i}(x),u_{i}*). Hence, ordering wants or criteria in decreasing order of importance, define the vector v(x) = [v_{1}(x), v_{2}(x),...]. Then in the now-familiar vector comparison, x is preferred to y if and only if the first nonzero component of the vector difference v(x) - v(y) is positive. This revised lexicographic ordering incorporating thresholds, with which Encarnacion's name has become inextricable, has since become known as an L* ordering to distinguish it from the ordinary lexicographic, or L-ordering.

=== L*-orderings under uncertainty ===
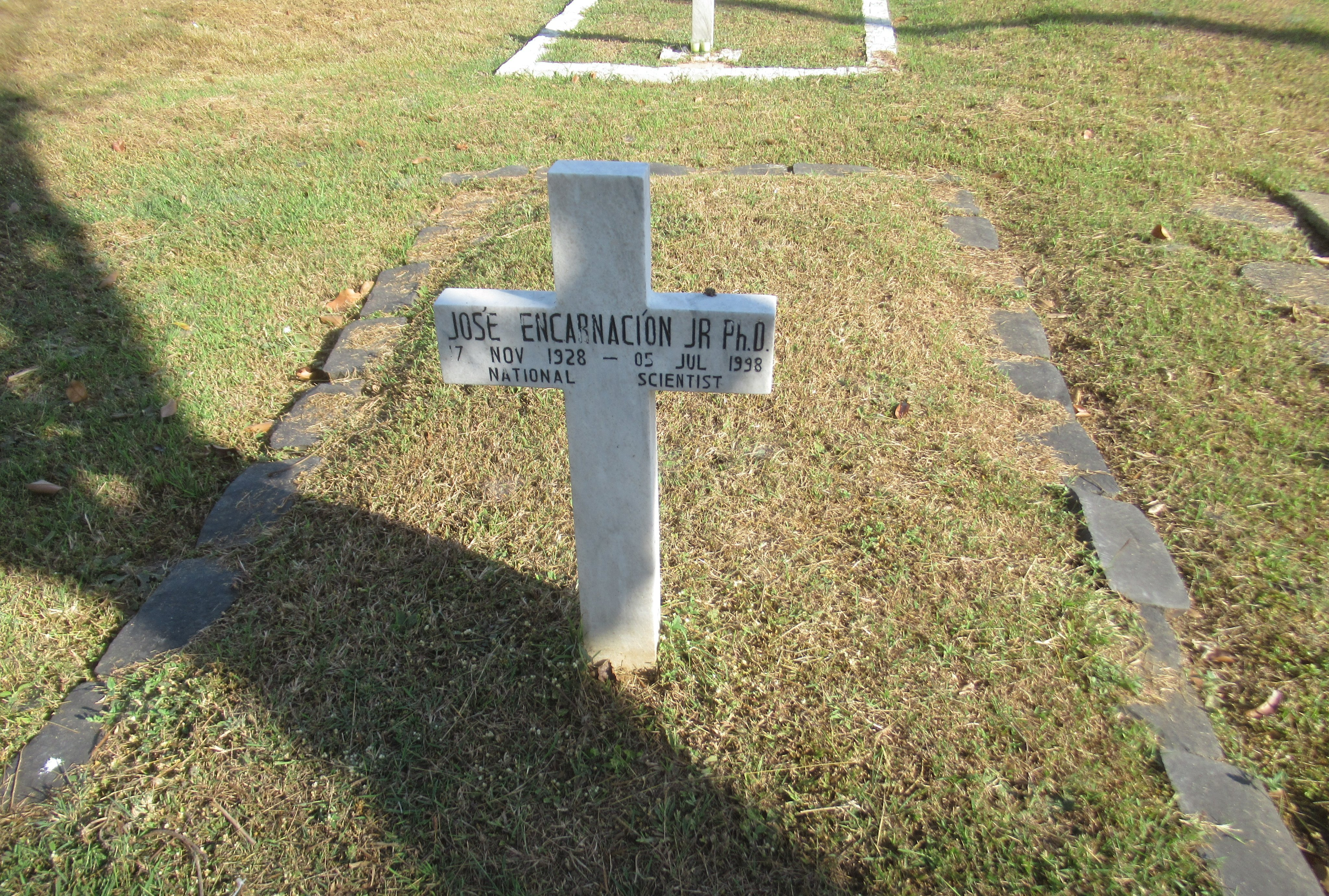
Encarnación Jr.'s grave at the Libingan ng mga Bayani.

Lexicographic preferences have also been found useful in describing choices under uncertainty. Let w_{i} = w_{i}(x, p(x)) be the ith utility from a vector of prospects x = (x_{1},..., x_{k},...) which has associated probabilities p(x) = (p_{1}(x_{1}),...,p_{k}(x_{n})). Note that the criterion function w_{i} depends explicitly not only on x but also on the probabilities associated with x. One may then define w_{¡}* as the satisficing level of w_{¡} and proceed to define lexicographic preference in the customary manner, with v(x) = [v_{1}(x),v_{2}(x),...] and v_{i}(x) = min (w_{i} (x, p(x), w_{i}*) for all i. It is straightforward to reproduce expected utility as a particular case by defining some primitive utility function u(.) that depends only on the individual x_{k}. In this case, one may write w_{1}(x, p(x)•u(x)), where u(x) = [u(x_{1}), u(x_{2}),...] and set w_{1}* sufficiently high to obtain the usual subjective expected utility. If other criteria are allowed to come into play, on the other hand, different possibilities arise. For example, for some i, w_{i} may depend only on the probability of ruinous levels of x, or on the maximal values of x. Encarnación [1987] uses preferences of this form in an ambitious attempt to reconstruct and explain all the apparent "paradoxes" in choice theory. Apart from lexicographic comparisons the new element introduced into the structure was the notion of significant differences in the values of criterion functions. Choice between two uncertain alternatives x and y, he suggests, turns on whether they differ significantly on the following lexicographically arranged criteria: (1) expected value, (2) the possibility of a large loss, (3) the possibility of maximal gain, and finally (4) expected value once more. Unlike his earlier 1964 formulation, however, this later version allows for intransitivity.
