= Gregorio Y. Zara =

Filipino scientist

Gregorio Y. Zara ONS
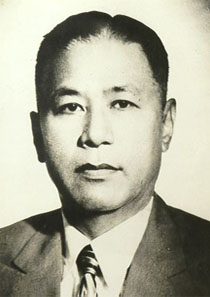
- Official portrait, National Academy of Science and Technology
- Born: Gregorio Ynciong Zara; 8 March 1902; Lipa, Batangas, Philippine Islands
- Died: 15 October 1978 (aged 76)
- Resting place: Himlayang Pilipino Memorial Park, Quezon City
- Education: University of the Philippines Manila; University of Michigan; Massachusetts Institute of Technology; University of Paris
- Occupations: Engineer and Inventor
- Awards: Order of National Scientists of the Philippines (1978)

Gregorio Ynciong Zara (8 March 1902 – 15 October 1978) was a Filipino engineer, physicist, a National Scientist, and inventor. He was known as the father of videoconferencing for having invented the first two-way videophone. He was also one of the country's pioneer aeronautical engineer having invented an airplane engine that ran on plain alcohol as fuel. This was due to the country's overstock of popular alcohol Tanduay, Tuba and Lambanog. Among his other notable inventions include a solar-powered water heater,, the discovery of the physical law of electrical kinetic resistance called the Zara effect,, and a propeller-cutting machine, among others.

== Education ==
A native of Lipa, Batangas, Zara finished primary schooling at Lipa Elementary School, where he graduated as valedictorian in 1918. In 1922, he again graduated valedictorian in Batangas High School, an accolade which warranted him a grant to study abroad. With full support from his parents he then enrolled at the University of the Philippines in Manila.

Zara then enrolled at the Massachusetts Institute of Technology (MIT) in the United States, and graduated with a degree of BS in Mechanical Engineering in 1926. After that he obtained a Master of Science in engineering (Aeronautical Engineering) at the University of Michigan in 1927, where he graduated as summa cum laude. In 1930, Zara then sailed to France to take up advanced studies in physics at the Sorbonne University in Paris. He graduated summa cum laude with a degree of Doctor of Science in physics, with "Tres Honorable," the highest honor conferred to graduate students.

== Career ==
Upon his return to the Philippines, Zara was appointed Technical Assistant on aviation matters in the office of the Secretary of Department of Public Works and Communications (DPWC). Subsequently, he became Chief of the aeronautical division of the DPWC. In 1936, he was assistant director and chief aeronautical engineer in the Bureau of Aeronautics of the Department of National Defense. For 21 years, he was director of aeronautical board, a position he held and confirmed by the Congress of the Philippines up to 1952. Considered expert in the field, he was chosen to be the technical editor of Aviation Monthly and at various times. On November 28, 1958, he was appointed as a Member, and subsequently as Vice Chairman and executive director of the National Science Development Board, where a number of science projects were impetus, including the Philippine Atomic Energy Commission.

While busy in government positions, Zara also was an educator. He was an instructor of aeronautics at the Valeriano Aviation School, at the American Far Eastern School of Aviation (1933) and at the Far Eastern University (1937–41). After his retirement from the government service in 1946, he joined the Far Eastern Air Transport Incorporated (FEATI). In 1945–1946, he served as President of FEATI Enterprises, Inc. Other positions he held were: Executive Vice President and Dean of Engineering and Technology at FEATI University (1946–); President of FEATI Scientific and Manufacturing Corp., Inc. (1956); 1st Vice President and Director, FEATI Industries, Inc. (1956–); Dean of the Institute of Science, Director of Research, and Director, Graduate School (1959–); and Director of FEATI Bank and Trust Co. (1961–). He also became the Vice Chairman of the Board of Trustees of FEATI University (1946–).

He was also a member of the board of directors of the National Shipyards and Steel Corporation and of the Civil Aeronautics Board.

== Marriage and children ==
On September 1, 1934, he married the former Miss Philippines and Queen of the 1933 Philippine Carnival, Engracia Laconico, and had four children: Antonio, Pacita, Josefina, and Lourdes.

== Death ==
On October 15, 1978, at the age of 76, Zara died of heart failure. The Philippine government accorded him a state funeral. He is interred at Himlayang Pilipino Memorial Park, Quezon City.

== Awards and Recognitions ==
During his lifetime he received several awards, which include the following:

- 1951 - Awarded Plaque and Diploma of Merit - Business Writers Association of the Philippines
- 1952 - Awarded Certificate of Merit for Exhibit of Philippine Made Propellers - Philippine International Fair
- 1953 - Aeronautical Engineer of the Year - Civil Aeronautics Administration (now CAAP)
- 1954 - Diploma of Merit and Gold Medal for invention a device for using alcohol as airplane fuel
- 1957 - Silver Wing Award and Plaque - Civil Aeronautics Administration (now CAAP)
- 1959 - Presidential Diploma of Merit and Distinguished Service Medal for his pioneering works and achievements in solar energy, aeronautics and television
- 1961 - Most Distinguished Scientist Citizen - Philippine Institute of Public Opinion and Philippine Institute of Leadership
- 1961 - Most Outstanding Scientist - Independent Radio Commentators and Announcers Society of the Philippines
- 1961 - Most Outstanding Aeronautical Engineer of the Year - Philippine Council Science and Technology (PHILCOST)
- 1961 - Plaque of Honor for Outstanding Contributions for Safety in the Philippine Aviation- Air Safety Week of the Philippines
- 1961 - First Prize and Certificate of Merit for TV-Telephone - National Economic Protectionism Association(NEPA)
- 1961 - First Prize and Certificate of Merit for Philippine made Airplane Propellers - National Economic Protectionism Association(NEPA)
- 1961 - First Prize and Certificate of Merit for Solar Oven - National Economic Protectionism Association(NEPA)
- 1966 - Presidential Gold Medal and Diploma of Honor for Science and Research
- 1966 - Cultural Heritage Award for Science Education and Aero Engineering
- 1969 - Plaque of Merit - Philippine Inventors Commission
- 1973 - Recognition Award - Association of Management and Industrial Engineers of the Philippines
- 1976 - Sigma Technology Award - Council of Technology and Allied Sciences of the Philippines
- 1977 - Distinguished Service Award - Philippine Association for the Advancement of Science

In 1978 he was conferred the Order of National Scientist by President Ferdinand Marcos.
