= Raul Fabella =

Filipino economist

Raul V. Fabella ONS
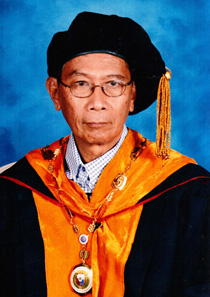
- Official portrait, National Academy of Science and Technology
- Born: April 12, 1949 (age 77); Bacolod, Negros Occidental, Philippines
- Occupation: Economist

Academic background
- Education: Seminario Mayor-Recoletos (AB); University of the Philippines Diliman (MA); Yale University (PhD)
- Awards: Order of National Scientists of the Philippines (2011)

Raul V. Fabella (born 12 April 1949) is a Filipino academic, economist and National Scientist of the Philippines.

== Early life and education ==
He was born to Estelito Fabella and Magdalena Villaseñor in Bacolod, Negros Occidental. Raul is the grandnephew of Gabriel Fabella, father of June 12th. Raul's grandfather Adriano was Gabriel's brother.

Fabella was educated at the Seminario Mayor-Recoletos in Baguio (now the Casiciaco Recoletos Seminary; A.B. in philosophy, 1970) and the University of the Philippines School of Economics at UP Diliman (M.A. in economics, 1975). He obtained his Ph.D. from the Department of Economics of Yale University in 1982 with the dissertation "Economies of Scale in the Household Production Model and Intra-Family Allocation of Resources". His entire academic career has been spent with the faculty of the University of the Philippines School of Economics (UPSE), which he served as dean from 1998 to 2007.

== Career ==
Fabella has written articles in both theoretical and applied fields: political economy and rent-seeking; the theory of teams; regulation; international economics; and mathematical economics. Notable concepts associated with him are the "Olson ratio" in rent-seeking, egalitarian Nash bargaining solutions, and the debt-adjusted real effective exchange rate.

Fabella was elected to the National Academy of Science and Technology (NAST) in 1995. Upon endorsement by NAST, he was awarded the title of National Scientist by President Benigno Aquino III on 27 July 2011. The National Scientist title is the highest recognition given by the Philippine Government to a Filipino for his or her outstanding contributions to science and technology.

== Economic views ==
In public-policy debates he has been a prominent advocate of a policy of currency undervaluation as a tool of development.

=== Maharlika Investment Fund ===
Fabella, sending a critique to the Philippine Daily Inquirer, criticized the Maharlika Investment Fund bill claiming that it is a "moral hazard arising from unnecessary state intervention and the unjustified economic backdrop". In his critique, "Beyond Repair: The Maharlika Wealth Fund", Fabella stated that the financial resources, excluding the Social Security System and Government Service Insurance System, for the House Bill will not solve the "fundamental problems". Fabella argues that the fund's assumption that the primary issue in Philippine infrastructure is financing is incorrect. He said that under weak rule of law the bill was "wrong in principle", and that the country's resources should instead go to domestic physical and human capital investment.

=== The Comprehensive Agrarian Reform Program (CARP) ===
At the Second International Conference on Agricultural and Rural Development in Southeast Asia (ARD2014) at the Shangri-La Hotel, Makati City, Fabella reported that the Comprehensive Agrarian Reform Program (CARP) met the "opposite" of its goals. His paper showed that coconut and sugar productivity under the program had fallen sharply. (Note: Coconut productivity was 40% lower and sugar productivity 8% lower.) Corn and rice productivity improved. Poverty incidence among agrarian reform beneficiaries stood at 54% in 2011, higher than among farmers in general. Fabella blamed the "sad results" from the illegalization of the market for land assets and the five-hectare land ownership ceiling.

=== 1987 Philippine Constitution ===
In February 2024, during a roundtable forum at the House of Representatives, Fabella stated that amending the 1987 Philippine Constitution would enhance the country's economic performance. He expressed his dissatisfaction with the constitution. One particular provision he points out is Section 11, Article 12, which mandates at least 60% Filipino ownership in Philippine businesses. This, according to him, limits foreign investment to a maximum of 40% equity, making foreign investors minority shareholders.
