= Federico M. Macaranas =

Federico M. Macaranas is a Filipino economist and professor at the Asian Institute of Management (AIM) and the executive director of the AIM Policy Center, a leading think tank in the Philippines and in South-East Asia. He was also conferred the Gawad Mabini, Dakilang Kamanong award, the highest award given by the Philippine government for diplomatic service, in 2001 by President Arroyo.
