= Order of Lakandula =

Philippine order

Order of Lakandula Order ni Lakandula
- Insignia of the Order

Awarded by Philippines
- Type: Order
- Established: September 19, 2003
- Awarded for: Acts that have been traditionally recognized by the institution of presidential awards, including meritorious political and civic service
- Status: Currently constituted
- Sovereign: President of the Philippines
- Grades: Grand Collar; Grand Cross; Grand Officer; Commander; Officer; Member; Champion for Life

Precedence
- Next (higher): Quezon Service Cross
- Next (lower): Order of Gabriela Silang
- Equivalent: Order of Sikatuna; Philippine Legion of Honor
- Ribbon bar of the order

The Order of Lakandula (Filipino: Orden ni Lakandula) is one of the highest civilian orders of the Philippines, established on September 19, 2003. It is awarded for political and civic merit and in memory of Lakandula’s dedication to the responsibilities of leadership, prudence, fortitude, courage and resolve in the service of one’s people.

== Criteria ==
The order's administrative basis is the Honors Code of the Philippines (Executive Order No. 236 issued by President Gloria Macapagal-Arroyo on September 19, 2003). In Section 5, II of the Honors Code, the following is provided as the criteria for the conferment of the Order of Lakandula:

The Order of Lakandula is conferred upon a Filipino or foreign citizen:
a. who has demonstrated by his life and deeds a dedication to the welfare of society;
b. whose life is worthy of emulation by the Filipino people;
c. for deeds worthy of particular recognition, including suffering materially for the preservation and defense of the democratic way of life and of the territorial integrity of the Republic of the Philippines, for devoting his life to the peaceful resolution of conflict, or for demonstrating an outstanding dedication to the fostering of mutual understanding, cultural exchange, justice and dignified relations among individuals; or
d. for acts that have been traditionally recognized by the institution of presidential awards, including meritorious political and civic service.

== Ranks ==
Order of Lakandula Ribbon Bars
Member	Officer	Commander	Grand Officer	Grand Cross	Grand Collar

=== Grand Collar (Supremo) ===
Conferred upon an individual who has suffered materially for the preservation and defense of the democratic way of life, or of the territorial integrity of the Republic of the Philippines, or upon a former or incumbent head of state and/or of government.

=== Grand Cross (Bayani) ===
Conferred upon an individual who has devoted his life to the peaceful resolution of conflict; upon an individual whose life is worthy of emulation by the Filipino people; or upon a Crown Prince, Vice President, Senate President, Speaker of the House, Chief Justice or the equivalent, foreign minister or other official of cabinet rank, Ambassador, Undersecretary, Assistant Secretary, or other person of a rank similar or equivalent to the foregoing.

=== Grand Officer (Marangal na Pinuno) ===
Conferred upon an individual who has demonstrated a lifelong dedication to the political and civic welfare of society; or upon a Chargé d'affaires e.d., Minister, Minister Counselor, Consul General heading a consular post, Executive Director, or other person of a rank similar or equivalent to the foregoing.

=== Commander (Komandante) ===
Conferred upon an individual who has demonstrated exceptional deeds of dedication to the political and civic welfare of society as a whole; or upon a Chargé d'affaires a.i., Counselor, First Secretary, Consul General in the consular section of an Embassy, Consular officer with a personal rank higher than Second Secretary, Director, or other person of a rank similar or equivalent to the foregoing.

=== Officer (Pinuno) ===
Conferred upon an individual who has demonstrated commendable deeds of dedication to the political and civic welfare of society as a whole; or upon a Second Secretary, Consul, Assistant Director, or other person of a rank similar or equivalent to the foregoing.

=== Member (Kagawad) ===
Conferred upon an individual who has demonstrated meritorious deeds of dedication to the political and civic welfare of society as a whole; or upon a Third Secretary, Vice Consul, Attaché, Principal Assistant, or other person of a rank similar or equivalent to the foregoing.

=== Champion for Life (Kampeon Habang Buhay) ===
The most recently created rank of the order, it was established in 2006 by President Gloria M. Arroyo. Although this rank was initially positioned after the rank of Pinuno, it was later moved to the level of the Order of National Artists.

It is conferred for outstanding achievement in international sports or beauty events and similar fields of competition and achievement. These achievements should foster national pride and serve as an inspiration to others to achieve excellence. The first recipients were boxer Manny Pacquiao, beauty queen Precious Lara Quigaman, Efren "Bata" Reyes a global icon who revolutionized the sport of pool, Paeng Nepomuceno in 2007 for his three unbroken Guinness World Records in 2007, Filipino athletes who won gold medals at the 2005 Southeast Asian Games, and the Filipino mountaineers who reached the peak of Mount Everest in 2006.

== Notable recipients ==
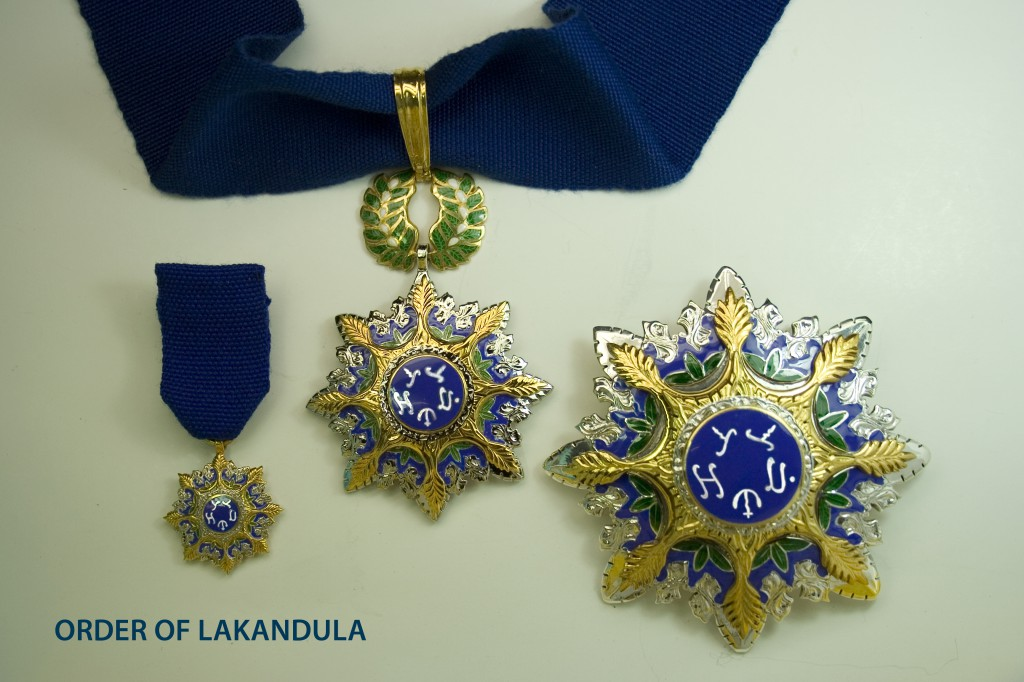
The badge on a neck ribbon, the star and miniature suspended from a chest ribbon of a Grand Officer of the Order of Lakandula.

- Jaime Sin: Grand Cross (Bayani), December 8, 2003
- José W. Diokno: Grand Collar (Supremo), 2004 (posthumous)
- James B. Reuter: Grand Cross (Bayani), 2006
- Teodoro Obiang Nguema Mbasogo: Grand Collar (Supremo), May 19, 2006
- Manuel V. Pangilinan: Commander (Kumandante), May 24, 2006; Grand Cross (Bayani), June 5, 2010
- Edgardo Pamintuan Sr.: Grand Cross (Bayani), April 22, 2010
- George Ty: Grand Cross (Bayani), June 5, 2010
- Al-Muhtadee Billah: Grand Cross (Bayani), November 9, 2006
- Khalifa bin Salman Al Khalifa: Grand Collar (Supremo), January 4, 2007
- Domingo Lucenario Jr.: Grand Officer (Marangal na Pinuno), August 14, 2007
- Armin A. Luistro: Grand Cross (Bayani), June 23, 2016
- Lea Salonga: Commander (Kumandante), August 14, 2007
- Rey Leonardo Guerrero: Commander (Kumandante), August 14, 2007
- Juan Carlos I of Spain: Grand Collar (Supremo), December 3, 2007
- Felipe VI of Spain: Grand Cross (Bayani), December 3, 2007
- Hassanal Bolkiah: Grand Collar (Supremo), January 30, 2009
- Efren Peñaflorida: Commander (Kumandante), November 27, 2009
- Shoichiro Toyoda: Grand Collar (Supremo), April 2010
- Reynato Puno: Grand Cross (Bayani), June 12, 2010
- Washington SyCip: Grand Cross (Bayani), 2011
- Hillary Rodham Clinton: Grand Cross (Bayani), November 16, 2011
- Sabah Al-Ahmad Al-Jaber Al-Sabah: Grand Collar (Supremo), March 23, 2012
- Hamad bin Khalifa Al Thani: Grand Collar (Supremo), April 10, 2012
- Richard Lugar: Grand Collar (Supremo), June 7, 2012
- Akihito, Emperor of Japan: Grand Collar (Supremo), June 3, 2015
- Galo Ocampo: Grand Officer (Marangal na Pinuno), July 22, 2015 (posthumous)
- Alfredo Benjamin Caguioa: Grand Cross (Bayani), June 27, 2016
- Adam Malik: Grand Collar (Supremo), August 8, 2017 (posthumous)
- Abdul Razak: Grand Collar (Supremo), August 8, 2017 (posthumous)
- S. Rajaratnam: Grand Collar (Supremo), August 8, 2017 (posthumous)
- Thanat Khoman: Grand Collar (Supremo), August 8, 2017 (posthumous)
- Narciso Ramos: Grand Collar (Supremo), August 8, 2017 (posthumous)
- Enrique Manalo: Grand Cross (Bayani), June 18, 2018
- Henry Lim Bon Liong: Grand Officer (Marangal na Pinuno), August 6, 2019
- Bong Go: Grand Cross (Bayani), June 16, 2022
- Arthur Tugade: Grand Cross (Bayani), June 16, 2022
- Vince Dizon: Grand Cross (Bayani), June 16, 2022
- Naruhito, Emperor of Japan: Grand Collar (Supremo), May 27, 2026
