= National Academy of Science and Technology =

Recognition and scientific advisory body of the Philippines

- Formation: December 16, 1976
- Type: Government Advisory Body
- Headquarters: 3/F Science Heritage Center Bldg., DOST Complex, Gen. Santos Avenue, Bicutan, Taguig
- Location: Philippines
- Official language: English
- President: Acd. Jaime C. Montoya
- Executive Director: Luningning E. Samarita-Domingo
- Budget: ₱150.927 million (2025)
- Staff: 17 (2024)
- Website: https://www.nast.dost.gov.ph/

The National Academy of Science and Technology (NAST; Filipino: Pambansang Akademya ng Agham at Teknolohiya) is the highest recognition and scientific advisory body of the Philippines under the Department of Science and Technology. It was created through Presidential Decree No. 1003-A, issued by President Ferdinand Marcos on December 16, 1976, to honor and recognize Filipino scientists who have made significant contributions to the advancement of science and technology in the country. It also recommends individuals for conferment of the Order of National Scientist, subject to the approval of the President of the Philippines.

== History ==
The establishment of the National Academy of Science and Technology was a proposal of several professors from the University of the Philippines System. It was endorsed by the National Science Development Board (now Department of Science and Technology) to the President of the Philippines. NAST was created through Presidential Decree 1003-A issued by President Ferdinand E. Marcos on December 16, 1976. In 1978, President Marcos named the first ten members of the academy from members of the scientific community with three of them proclaimed as National Scientist, namely: Juan S. Salcedo Jr., Alfredo C. Santos and Gregorio Y. Zara. Through Executive Order 818 in 1982, the academy was tasked to give recommendations to the President of the Republic of the Philippines and the Cabinet on policies concerning science and technology in the country.

== Mandates ==
The National Academy of Science and Technology is mandated:

1. To recognize outstanding achievements in science and technology as well as provide meaningful incentives to those engaged in scientific and technological researches
2. To advise the President and the Cabinet on matters related to science and technology
3. To engage in projects and programs designed to recognize outstanding achievements in science and to promote scientific productivity
4. To embark on programs traditionally and internationally expected of an academy of science
5. To manage, operate and maintain the Philippine Science Heritage Center
6. To manage the Philippine Scientific Career System

== Functions ==
The Academy's functions are the following:

- Recognition: As the highest government recognition body, it recognizes and supports works of different Filipino scientist that promotes advancement of science and encourages the youth to pursue science related careers.
- Advisory: As an advisory body, it brings science closer to the people through awareness, promotes public participation on science issues and advises the government and non-government entities on science-related policies
- Scientific Linkages: NAST communicates with other scientists inside and outside the country to promote collaboration and exchange of works, knowledge, and participation.
- Management of the Philippine Science Heritage Center (PSHC): By virtue of Republic Act 9107, the NAST is mandated to manage the PSHC as a repository of all Philippine outstanding accomplishments in science and technology.

== Organization and Membership ==
Members of the National Academy of Science and Technology are nominated by members of the scientific community. Current NAST members deliberate on the membership of an individual, following strict rules and regulations. Once admitted to the organization, members are called Academicians (abbreviated as Acd.). The academy is divided into several divisions to which an Academician is a member depending on his area of expertise. The divisions are the following:

1. Agricultural Sciences
2. Biological Sciences
3. Engineering Sciences and Technology
4. Health Sciences
5. Mathematical and Physical Sciences
6. Social Sciences

From each division of the academy, a chair is elected to form the Executive Council. A president, vice-president, and secretary are elected from the Executive Council. The secretariat of NAST is headed by a director and implements the decisions of the Executive Council, and attends to the day-to-day affairs of the Academy. Currently, the NAST Executive Council is composed of:

- Acd. Jaime C. Montoya, President and Chair, Health Sciences Division
- Acd. Jose Maria P. Balmaceda, Vice President and Chair, Mathematical and Physical Sciences Division
- Acd. Windell L. Rivera, Secretary and Chair, Biological Sciences Division
- Acd. Rex Victor O. Cruz, Chair, Agricultural Sciences Division
- Acd. Alvin B. Culaba, Chair, Engineering Sciences and Technology Division
- Acd. Allan B.I. Bernardo, Chair, Social Sciences Division
- Acd. Arnel A. Salvador, Member

A Director heads the NAST Secretariat, which implements decisions of the Executive Council and attends day-to-day affairs of the Academy. The Secretariat is composed of two divisions, namely: Technical Services Division and Finance Administrative Division.

=== Academicians ===
Members of the NAST are called Academicians. As of 2024, there are 71 living Academicians.

=== National Scientist ===
All National Scientists are members of the NAST. As of August 2024, there are 11 living National Scientists.

=== Corresponding Members ===
Corresponding membership is conferred on non-resident Filipino scientists who have made exemplary contributions to the advancement of science and technology and must have continuing connections and contributions to Philippine science. They should regularly come to the Philippines to practice their field of expertise. Filipino citizenship and residency are waived as long as the three qualifications are met.

Year Elected	Name	Field of Specialization
2003	Jose B. Cruz, Ph.D.	Electrical Engineering
2003	Amador C. Muriel, Ph.D.	Physics
2003	Eduardo A. Padlan, Ph.D.	Biophysics
2004	Baldomero M. Olivera, Ph.D.	Biochemistry
2006	Reynaldo L. Villareal, Ph.D.	Plant Breeding/Plant Pathology
2007	Liwayway M. Engle, Ph.D.	Genetics
2009	Manuel M. Garcia, Ph.D.	Microbiology
2010	Kelvin S. Rodolfo, Ph.D. (resigned)	Marine Geology
2011	Eduardo R. Mendoza, Ph.D.	Mathematics
2012	Alfonso H. Albano, Ph.D.	Physics
2016	Josefino Comiso, Ph.D.	Physics
2016	Joel Cuello, Ph.D.	Engineering
2018	Rigoberto Advincula, Ph.D.	Physics
2019	Michael Purugganan, Ph.D.	Biology
2019	Romel Gomez, Ph.D.	Engineering
2020	Annabelle Villalobos, Ph.D.	Chemistry
2020	Serafica Gonzalo, Ph.D.	Chemicial Engineering
2020	Ramon Gustillo, M.D.	Orthopedics
2020	Francis De Los Reyes III, Ph.D.	Environmental Engineering
2023	Leodevico Ilag, Ph.D.	Microbiology and Immunology
2024	Homer D. Pantua, Ph.D.	Biomedical Sciences and Veterinary Medicine

=== Honorary Member ===
Year Elected	Name	Field of Specialization
2000	Norman E. Borlaug, Ph.D. 1970 Nobel Peace Prize Laureate	Agronomy/Plant Breeding

== Annual Scientific Meeting ==
The academy has conducted a scientific meeting every July since 1978. It gathers scientists from all over the country to discuss relevant issues related to science and technology. At the end of the convention, NAST honors exemplary scientists from different fields and presents recommendations to the government through the secretary of the Department of Science and Technology.

=== List of Annual Scientific Meetings ===
Year	Edition	Theme
2026	48th Annual Scientific Meeting	UN SDGs: Science, Technology, and Innovation for Sustainable Development
2025	47th Annual Scientific Meeting	Bioscience Innovations: Transforming Enterprise Ecosystems for Wealth Creation
2024	46th Annual Scientific Meeting	Beyond Farm Productivity: Transforming the Philippine food system to address equity, consumer health, and environmental issues
2023	45th Annual Scientific Meeting	Agham at Teknolohiya para sa Demokrasya (Science and Technology for Democracy)
2022	44th Annual Scientific Meeting	PAGTANAW 2050: Agham Tungo sa Mabuting Kinabukasan / FORESIGHT 2050: Science for a Sustainable Future
2021	43rd Annual Scientific Meeting	COVID-19 Pandemic: Learning from the Past, Coping with the Present, Moving to the Next
2020	42nd Annual Scientific Meeting	Science and Technology for Society: Solutions to Long-Standing Concerns
2019	41st Annual Scientific Meeting	Caring for the Country's Carrying Capacity
2018	40th Annual Scientific Meeting	Science and Technology-Enhanced Transformation for Sustainability and Resiliency (2018-2030)
2017	39th Annual Scientific Meeting	Attaining Sustainable Development Goals: Philippine Fisheries and Other Aquatic Resources 2020
2016	38th Annual Scientific Meeting	Looking Back and Looking Forward
2015	37th Annual Scientific Meeting	The Challenges of Non-Communicable Diseases (NCDs): Responding through Multisectoral Action
2014	36th Annual Scientific Meeting	Infrastructure, Information, and Innovation (I3) for National Development, Competitiveness, and Resiliency
2013	35th Annual Scientific Meeting	Harnessing Science and Technology: Reversing the Decline of the Manufacturing Sector in the Philippines
2012	34th Annual Scientific Meeting	Philippine Water 2050
2011	33rd Annual Scientific Meeting	Meeting the Challenges of Agricultural Productivity
2010	32nd Annual Scientific Meeting	MDGs & Beyond Are We Making Progress
2009	31st Annual Scientific Meeting	Active Aging Preparing for Quality Life
2008	30th Annual Scientific Meeting	Energy Security & Sustainability Assessing the Present & Foreseeing the Future
2007	29th Annual Scientific Meeting	A Progressive Philippines Anchored on Science Building a Culture of Science in the Philippines
2006	28th Annual Scientific Meeting	The Century of Biology
2005	27th Annual Scientific Meeting	Philippine Agriculture 2020
2004	26th Annual Scientific Meeting	On Being & Becoming Where We Are & Where We Want To Be
2003	25th Annual Scientific Meeting	Addressing the Demographic Crisis in the Philippines
2002	24th Annual Scientific Meeting	Enhancing Philippine Science and Technology Thru ICT
2001	23rd Annual Scientific Meeting	Science is the 21st Century
2000	22nd Annual Scientific Meeting	Challenges in the New Millennium for Science and Technology
1999	21st Annual Scientific Meeting	Food, Population and Environment
1998	20th Annual Scientific Meeting	4th National Social Science Congress
1997	19th Annual Scientific Meeting	Science for Better Health
1996	18th Annual Scientific Meeting	S&T for a more Dynamic Mindanao
1995	17th Annual Scientific Meeting	Ethics and Politics of Public Service
1994	16th Annual Scientific Meeting	Vision for Philippines 2000
1993	15th Annual Scientific Meeting	The Filipino: Issues and Processes in Social Transformation
1992	14th Annual Scientific Meeting	Coping with Natural Disasters
1991	13th Annual Scientific Meeting	Managing Ecosystems for Long:Term Human Survival
1990	12th Annual Scientific Meeting	
1989	11th Annual Scientific Meeting	
1988	10th Annual Scientific Meeting	
1987	9th Annual Scientific Meeting	
1986	8th Annual Scientific Meeting	Organization and Development of the Sciences and the Scientific Community
1985	6th Annual Scientific Meeting	
1981	3rd Annual Scientific Meeting	

== Awards ==
NAST also recognizes worthy contributions of Filipino scientists in the advancement of science and technology in the country during its Annual Scientific Meeting. It includes the following recognitions: Outstanding Young Scientists (OYS), The World Academy of Sciences for Developing Countries (TWAS) Prize for Young Scientists in the Philippines, NAST Talent Search for Young Scientists, NAST Environmental Science Award, NAST-LELEDFI Award for Outstanding Research in Tropical Medicine, Outstanding Scientific Papers, Outstanding Books and Outstanding Monographs.

== Publications ==
As a promoter of science and technology, NAST also publishes books and monographs based on studies of present academicians, members of the scientific community and world-renowned scientists. Conference proceedings of their annual scientific meeting is published as the Transactions NAST PHL.

In 2021, the NAST published PAGTANAW 2050: The Philippine Science, Technology, and Innovation Foresight. it outlines a 30-year vision to guide the country’s STI agenda toward inclusive growth, sustainability, and national competitiveness by 2050. Rooted in the archipelagic and maritime character of the Philippines, PAGTANAW 2050 synthesizes global megatrends—such as climate change, pandemics, and digital transformation—with national priorities drawn from the 1987 Constitution, the Sustainable Development Goals (SDGs), AmBisyon Natin 2040, and various Philippine development plans. Covering 12 key areas, including the Blue Economy, Governance, Education, and Space Exploration, the foresight identifies critical drivers of change and proposes long-term strategies that transcend political cycles. It serves as a unifying framework for policymakers, scientists, and stakeholders to build a future-ready, innovation-driven nation.
