= List of Academicians of the Philippines =

Academicians are distinguished members of the National Academy of Science and Technology (abbreviated as NAST), the highest recognition and scientific advisory body of the Philippines. The first Academicians were appointed in 1978 by President Ferdinand E. Marcos. Possible members are distinguished scientists in their own field which are nominated by members of the scientific community. The current NAST members deliberate on the membership of an individual following strict rules and regulations. From their ranks, the next National Scientist of the Philippines would be nominated and approved by the President of the Philippines.

Year elected as Academician	Image	Name	Field of specialization
1978	Official portrait of Paulo Campos as a National Scientist of the Philippines	Paulo C. Campos, M.D. (Note: Deceased) (Note: Later conferred the rank of a National Scientist in 1989)	Nuclear Medicine
1978	Alfredo Lagmay, National Academy of Science and Technology	Alfredo V. Lagmay, Ph.D. (Note: Later conferred the rank of a National Scientist in 1988)	Experimental Psychology
1978		Cecilio F. Lopez, Dr. Phil.	Philippine Linguistics and Oriental Studies
1978		Tito A. Mijares, Ph.D.	Statistics
1978	Juan S. Salcedo, Jr., National Academy of Science and Technology	Juan S. Salcedo, Jr., M.D., D.Sc. (Note: Later conferred the rank of a National Scientist in 1978)	Nutrition and Public Health
1978		Alfredo C. Santos, Dr. Phil.	Physical Chemistry
1978		Dioscoro L. Umali, Ph.D. (Note: Later conferred the rank of a National Scientist in 1986)	Genetics and Plant Breeding
1978		Carmen C. Velasquez, Ph.D. (Note: Later conferred the rank of a National Scientist in 1983)	Parasitology
1978		Gregorio T. Velasquez, Ph.D. (Note: Later conferred the rank of a National Scientist in 1982)	Phycology
1978	Gregorio Y. Zara, National Academy of Science and Technology	Gregorio Y. Zara, D. Sc.	Engineering and Inventions
1979	Official portrait of Encarnacion Alzona from the National Academy of Science and Technology	Encarnacion A. Alzona, Ph.D. (Note: Later conferred the rank of a National Scientist in 1985)	Philippine History
1979	Official portrait of Teodoro Agoncillo, National Academy of Science and Technology	Teodoro A. Agoncillo, Litt.D. (h.c.) (Note: Posthumous conferment)	Philippine History
1979	Jose Encarnacion Jr., National Academy for Science and Technology	José Encarnación, Jr., Ph.D. (Note: Later conferred the rank of a National Scientist in 1987)	Economics
1979	Official portrait of Pedro Escuro from the National Academy of Science and Technology	Pedro B. Escuro, Ph.D. (Note: Later conferred the rank of a National Scientist in 1994)	Genetics and Plant Breeding
1979		Raymundo A. Favila, Ph.D.	Mathematics
1979		Francisco M. Fronda, Ph.D.	Animal Husbandry
1979		Bienvenido O. Juliano, Ph.D. (Note: Later conferred the rank of a National Scientist in 2000)	Organic Chemistry
1979		Melecio S. Magno, Ph.D.	Physics
1979		Fe del Mundo, M.D., M.A. (Note: Later conferred the rank of a National Scientist in 1980)	Pediatrics
1979		Geminiano T. de Ocampo, M.D.	Ophthalmology
1979		Eduardo A. Quisumbing, Ph.D.	Plant Taxonomy, Systematics and Morphology
1979		Jose N. Rodriguez, M.D.	Leprology
1979		Casimiro del Rosario, Ph.D.	Physics, Astronomy, and Meteorology
1980		Luz Oliveros-Belardo, Ph.D.	Pharmaceutical Chemistry
1980		Magdalena C. Cantoria, Ph.D.	Botany
1980		Emerita V. de Guzman, Ph.D.	Plant Physiology
1980		Conrado S. Dayrit, M.D.	Pharmacology, Cardiology
1980		Francisco O. Santos, Ph.D.	Human Nutrition and Agricultural Chemistry
1980		Joventino D. Soriano, Ph.D.	Cytogenetics and Mutation Research
1980	Headshot of Clara Lim-Sylianco as a National Scientist	Clara Y. Lim-Sylianco, Ph.D.	Biochemistry and Organic Chemistry
1981	Clare Baltazar as a National Scientist	Clare R. Baltazar, Ph.D. (Note: Later conferred the rank of a National Scientist in 2001)	Systematic Entomology
1981	Julian Banzon, Official Gazette of the Republic of the Philippines	Julian A. Banzon, Ph.D.	Biophysical Chemistry
1981		Amando M. Dalisay, Ph.D.	Economics
1981		Benjamin D. Cabrera, M.D., M.P.H.	Medical Parasitology and Public Health
1982		Emil Q. Javier, Ph.D. (Note: Later conferred the rank of a National Scientist in 2019)	Plant Breeding and Genetics
1983	Gelia T. Castillo ONS	Gelia T. Castillo, Ph.D. (Note: Later conferred the rank of a National Scientist in 1999)	Rural Sociology
1983		Jose O. Juliano, Ph.D.	Nuclear Chemistry and Physics
1983		Hilario D. G. Lara, M.D., Dr. P.H.	Public Health
1983	Fr. Bienvenido Nebres (2012)	Bienvenido F. Nebres, S.J., Ph.D. (Note: Later conferred the rank of a National Scientist in 2011)	Mathematics
1983		Faustino T. Orillo, Ph.D.	Mycology
1983		Jose R. Velasco, Ph.D. (Note: Later conferred the rank of a National Scientist in 1998)	Plant Physiology
1985		Quintin L. Kintanar, M.D., Ph.D.	Environmental Medicine
1985		Quirino O. Navarro, Ph.D.	Nuclear Chemistry
1985		Gregorio F. Zaide, Ph.D.	History
1987		Solita F. Camara-Besa, M.D., M.S.	Biochemistry
1987		Filomena F. Campos, Ph.D.	Plant Breeding/Cytogenetics
1987		Lourdes J. Cruz, Ph.D. (Note: Later conferred the rank of a National Scientist in 2006)	Biochemistry
1987		Edito G. Garcia, M.D.	Medical Parasitology
1987		Carmen Ll. Intengan, Ph.D.	Nutrition
1987		Dolores A. Ramirez, Ph.D.	Biochemical Genetics
1987		Benito S. Vergara, Ph.D.	Plant Physiology
1987		Prescillano M. Zamora, Ph.D.	Plant Anatomy-Morphology
1988		Ricardo M. Lantican, Ph.D. (Note: Later conferred the rank of a National Scientist in 2005)	Plant Breeding
1990		Leopoldo S. Castillo, Ph.D.	Animal Science
1990		Apolinario D. Nazarea, Ph.D.	Biophysics
1990		Ruben L. Villareal, Ph.D.	Horticulture
1992	Mercedes Concepcion	Mercedes B. Concepcion, Ph.D. (Note: Later conferred the rank of a National Scientist in 2010)	Demography
1992		Ernesto O. Domingo, M.D.	Internal Medicine/Gastroenterology
1992		Rafael D. Guerrero III, Ph.D.	Fisheries Management
1992		Evelyn Mae T. Mendoza, Ph.D.	Biochemistry
1993		Ramon F. Abarquez, Jr., M.D.	Cardiology
1993		Salcedo L. Eduardo, Ph.D.	Veterinary and Medical Parasitology
1993		Edgardo D. Gomez, Ph.D. (Note: Later conferred the rank of a National Scientist in 2014)	Marine Biology
1993		Teodulo M. Topacio Jr., Ph.D. (Note: Later conferred the rank of a National Scientist in 2008)	Veterinary Medicine
1994		Perla D. Santos Ocampo, M.D., FPPS, FAAP	Pediatrics
1995		Ledivina V. Cariño, Ph.D.	Sociology and Public Administration
1995	Raul Fabella, National Academy of Science and Technology	Raul V. Fabella, Ph.D.	Economics
1995		William G. Padolina, Ph.D.	Phytochemistry
1996		Veronica F. Chan, Ph.D.	Microbiology
1996		Andrew Gonzalez, F.S.C, Ph.D.	Linguistics
1999		Onofre D. Corpuz, Ph.D. (Note: Later conferred the rank of a National Scientist in 2004)	Political Economy and Government
2000		Filemon A. Uriarte, Jr., Ph.D.	Chemical Engineering
2001		Ceferino L. Follosco, Ph.D. (h.c.)	Mechanical, Electrical, & Agricultural Engineering
2001		Angel L. Lazaro III, Ph.D.	Civil Engineering
2001		William T. Torres, Ph.D.	Computer Science
2001		Reynaldo B. Vea, Ph.D.	Marine Transportation System and Naval Architecture
2002		Romulo G. Davide, Ph.D.	Plant Pathology
2002		Asuncion K. Raymundo, Ph.D.	Microbial Genetics/Plant Pathology
2004	Official portrait of Philippine National Scientist Ramon Barba	Ramon C. Barba, Ph.D.	Horticulture
2004	National Scientist Angel Alcala	Angel C. Alcala, Ph.D.	Biological Sciences
2005	Saloma23May2011	Caesar A. Saloma, Ph.D.	Physics
2006		Eliezer A. Albacea, Ph.D.	Computer Science
2006		Thelma E. Tupasi, M.D.	Infectious Diseases
2007		Christopher C. Bernido, Ph.D.	Theoretical Physics
2007		Leonardo Q. Liongson, Ph.D.	Water Resources Administration and Hydrology
2007		Allan Benedict I. Bernardo, Ph.D.	Cognitive Psychology
2008		Libertado C. Cruz, Ph.D.	Reproductive Biotechnology
2008		Gisela P. Concepcion, Ph.D.	Marine Natural Products, Biochemistry, and Biomedical Sciences
2008		Gavino C. Trono, Ph.D.	Marine Botany, Seaweed Biodiversity, Taxonomy, Ecology and Culture
2008		Jose Maria P. Balmaceda, Ph.D.	Mathematics
2008		Alvin B. Culaba, Ph.D.	Mechanical Engineering
2008		Jaime C. Montoya, M.D., M.S.	Infectious Diseases
2008		Carmencita D. Padilla, M.D., MAHPS (Note: Later conferred the rank of a National Scientist in 2023)	Genetics
2008	02-SAMB	Arsenio M. Balisacan, Ph.D.	Economics
2009		Rodel D. Lasco, Ph.D.	Forestry
2009		Eufemio T. Rasco Jr., Ph.D.	Plant Breeding
2009		Rhodora V. Azanza, Ph.D.	Botany
2009		Fabian M. Dayrit, Ph.D.	Chemistry
2010		Marco Nemesio E. Montaño, Ph.D.	Biological Chemistry
2010		Fernando P. Siringan, Ph.D.	Geology
2010		Guillermo Q. Tabios III, Ph.D.	Civil Engineering
2010		Antonio Miguel L. Dans, M.D.	Clinical Epidemiology
2011		Ernesto J. Del Rosario, Ph.D.	Chemistry
2011		Aura C. Matias, Ph.D.	Industrial Engineering
2011		Agnes C. Rola, Ph.D.	Agricultural Economics
2012		Jose B. Cruz, Jr., Ph.D.	Electrical Engineering
2012	Dr Michael L Tan	Michael L. Tan, Ph.D.	Anthropology
2014		Porfirio Alexander M. Aliño, Ph.D.	Marine Chemical Ecology
2015		Ceferino P. Maala, Ph.D.	Veterinary Medicine
2015		Jurgenne H. Primavera, Ph.D.	Marine Science
2015		Fortunato B. Sevilla III, Ph.D.	Instrumentation and Analytical Science
2015		Estrella F. Alabastro, Ph.D.	Chemical Engineering
2015		Edward H.M. Wang, Ph.D.	Orthopaedics
2016		Virginia C. Cuevas, Ph.D.	Botany
2016		Alfredo Mahar Francisco A. Lagmay, Ph.D.	Geology
2017		Cesar L. Villanoy, Ph.D.	Physical Oceanography
2017		Raymond Girard R. Tan, Ph.D.	Mechanical Engineering
2018		Glenn B. Gregorio, Ph.D.	Genetics
2018	MDSantos	Mudjekeewis D. Santos, Ph.D.	Applied Marine Biosciences
2018		Victor B. Amoroso, Ph.D.	Botany
2018		Arnel N. Salvador, Ph.D.	Physics
2018		Mahar K. Mangahas, Ph.D.	Economics
2019		Rex Victor O. Cruz, Ph.D.	Watershed Management
2019		Benito M. Pacheco, Ph.D.	Civil Engineering
2019		Rody G. Sy, Ph.D.	Cardiology/Internal Medicine
2019		Juan M. Pulhin, Ph.D.	Geographical Sciences
2019		Marie Antonette J. Meñez, Ph.D.	Biological Sciences
2020		Arnel N. Del Barrio, Ph.D.	Ruminant Nutrition
2020		Windell L. Rivera, Ph.D.	Cellular and Molecular Microbiology
2020		Maribel G. Nonato, Ph.D.	Chemistry
2020		Charlotte M. Chiong, Ph.D.	Otolaryngology
2020		Christopher P. Monterola, Ph.D.	Physics (Data Science)
2021		Cristina J. Montiel, Ph.D.	Social Psychology
2021		Manolo G. Mena, Ph.D.	Metallurgy
2021		Camilo C. Roa, Jr., M.D.	Pulmonary Medicine
2021		Arvin C. Diesmos, Ph.D.	Biology
2023		Elmer P. Dadios, Ph.D.	Manufacturing Engineering
2023		Gil S. Jacinto, Ph.D.	Chemical Oceanography
2023		Maria Corazon A. De Ungria, Ph.D.	Microbiology / Forensic Genetics
2023		Roel R. Suralta, Ph.D.	Agricultural Sciences
2024		Cleofas R. Cervancia, Ph.D.	Entomology
2024	Fortunato dela Pena (05010376) (45364247344) (cropped)	Fortunato T. de la Peña, LLD, DTech (honoris causa)	Law and Technology
2024		Joseph S. Magsangkay, Ph.D.	Agriculture and Veterinary Medicine
2025		Wilfredo Roehl Y. Licuanan, Ph.D.	Marine Ecology
2025		Leocadio S. Sebastian, Ph.D.	Plant Breeding
2025		Charles Y. Yu, M.D.	Pulmonary/Infectious Disease
