= Charlotte Chiong =

Filipino otolaryngologist

Charlotte M. Chiong
- Education: University of the Philippines Diliman; Radboud University Nijmegen
- Scientific career
- Fields: Otolaryngology
- Workplaces: University of the Philippines College of Medicine; University of the Philippines Manila

Charlotte Martinez Chiong (born June 11, 1961) is a Filipino otolaryngologist with a subspecialty in neurotology, focusing on hearing health, cochlear implants, and neurotological skull base surgery based in Malolos and Manila, Philippines. She is best known for her research on children's implantable hearing devices, which built the foundation for the Republic Act No. 9709 of the Philippines that organized a universal screening program for hearing loss in newborns.

== Background ==
Chiong was never married and is still single. She was born in Manila to Geraldine (née Martinez: 1926–2023) and Armando Tantoco Chiong, MD (August 29, 1930-May 27, 2018), the brother of Rafael, Jr. (December 2, 1932-February 2, 1970), Malolos Provincial Fiscal Faustino (died in December 2023), Vicente, MD, Teresita, MD., Evangeline and Enrica Tantoco Chiong Reyes (October 29, 1931-January 5, 2024). Chiong's medical roots came from his father Armando and grandparents Rafael D. Chiong (October 4, 1898-August 27, 1984) and Natividad Tantoco Chiong (December 24, 1905-November 20, 1979), who are descendants of Don Faustino Chiong (1936-1963, buried at the Manila Cathedral's vestibule) and Don Fausto Chiong, who built the Chiong ancestral house in 1892 at the Malolos Historic Town Center. It housed the Secretaria de Interior (Administrative Office of the Interior) in 1898-1899, beside post-war Eden Cinema and the old neo-Classical Malolos town Hall erected in 1940. In the 1990s, the historic house became the Law office of her uncle former Provincial Fiscal Faustino Tantoco Chiong.

Chiong, with her parents, and siblings Armando Martinez Chiong, Jr. M.D. married to Carmina E. Chiong, M.D., Rafael Martinez Chiong, M.D., Sandra Martinez Chiong (March 7, 1963-January 21, 1980), and Mary Ellen Chiong Perez, M.D. resided at their Barangay Sumapang Matanda, Malolos ancestral house. Her father, Armando Sr. is a pillar of Philippine Society of Otolaryngology, former President of the PSO-HNS and former Chair of the Department of ORL, UP-PGH and ORL, Manila Doctors Hospital. In 1961, her father Armando was elected Fellow of the American Academy of Otolaryngology–Head and Neck Surgery.

In 1963, Chiong's Father Armando Sr. established the Malolos E.E.N.T. Hospital, a building along MacArthur Highway Sumapang Matanda, Malolos. As mentor, he trained her along physicians Ma. Carmina Espiritu-Chiong, Armando Martinez Chiong, Rafael Martinez Chiong, Anthony R. Perez and Mary Ellen Chiong Perez.

Armando Tantoco Chiong's wake was held at The Heritage Park, Bonifacio Global City on May 30, 2018. He was buried at the Malolos Catholic Cemetery alongside his wife Geraldine Martinez and daughter Sandra. His parents Natividad Tantoco Chiong & Rafael D. Chiong (October 4, 1898-August 27, 1984) and brother, Rafael Tantoco Chiong, Jr. were also buried opposite their tombs.

=== Education and Training ===
Chiong graduated summa cum laude from the University of the Philippines Diliman in 1981 with her Bachelor of Science in Zoology. She then earned her Doctor of Medicine from the University of the Philippines College of Medicine Manila in 1985. Chiong completed her internship in medicine at the University of the Philippines Manila, Philippine General Hospital from May 1985 to April 1986. She received otolaryngology residency training from the Department of Otolaryngology at the Philippine General Hospital from January 1987 to December 1990, where she was rewarded Chief Resident and Most Outstanding Resident. Chiong then traveled to the United States to do a research fellowship in otology under Dr. Joseph B. Nadol, Jr. at the Massachusetts Eye and Ear Infirmary, Harvard Medical School in Boston, Massachusetts from January 1991 to May 1992. In 1991, Chiong was appointed Research Fellow of Otology and Laryngology by the Harvard University in Cambridge. Afterward, she moved to Canada to complete a clinical fellowship in neurotology and skull base surgery under Dr. Julian M. Nedzelski at the Sunnybrook Health Science Center at the University of Toronto in Toronto, Ontario from July 1992 to June 1993. In 1992, Chiong earned credits in attending the Temporal Bone Dissection Course at The House Ear Institute, and in 1996, she attended the combined 2nd International Skull Base Congress and the 7th Annual Meeting of the North American Skull Base Society, respectively. In 1997, Chiong was elected Corresponding Member of the American Academy of Otolaryngology–Head and Neck Surgery.

From 2011 to 2013 to accomplished her PhD in medical sciences from Radboud University Nijmegen. on a thesis entitled "Early Detection and Screening for Childhood Deafness in the Philippines."

== Career ==
In 1987, Chiong started as an assistant doctor of her father at their family-owned Malolos E.E.N.T. Hospital along MacArthur Highway beside the present Robinsons Malls Malolos, where she held clinic every Saturday evening.

In 1993, Chiong became an associate professor at the University of the Philippines College of Medicine, where she later became Chief of Research Implementation and Development Office from 2011 to July 2012. She was a Faculty and convenor of the 1st ASEAN Academy of Neurotology Otology and Audiology (AANOA) in November 2008 at Dusit Thani Manila. She is a founder of the Newborn Hearing Screening Reference Center, National Institutes of Health at the University of the Philippines Manila, where she served as director from March 5, 2012 to December 1, 2018. Chiong was Vice Chancellor for Planning and Development at the University of the Philippines Manila from February 1, 2013 to November 2014. She also held the position of director at the Philippine National Ear Institute, National Institutes of Health at the University of the Philippines Manila from November 1, 2014 to December 1, 2018. Chiong is currently the 17th Dean of the University of the Philippines College of Medicine for a third consecutive term with six pillars under her INSPIRE Flagship programme. She is also a current Commissioner of The Lancet Commission on Global Hearing Loss.

== Awards ==
Throughout her career, Chiong has been awarded and recognized for her work.

In 2002, Chiong received from the University of the Philippines College of Medicine Manila PGH the Outstanding Researcher citation.

In 2004, Chiong received the University of the Philippines Manila Outstanding Researcher Award.

She first earned the Philippine Society of Otolaryngology, Head and Neck Surgery Outstanding Award for Research and Outstanding Family Award in Otolaryngology in 2006, then later again in 2015.

In 2007, Chiong was awarded The Outstanding Filipino Physician Award.

In 2008, Chiong was an Awardee, Bulacan Gawad Dangal ng Lipi 2008 on Health science.

She then won the International Award for Otology in 2011.

In 2013, Chiong was presented with the Outstanding Educator Award from the University of the Philippines Medical Alumni Society.

The University of the Philippines Alumni Association granted her the Distinguished Alumni Award in Medicine for Health Administration and Promotion in 2015.

On December 21, 2016, the University of the Philippines College of Medicine Dean Agnes D. Mejia gave Chiong the Solita Camara-Besa Award for Academic Distinction,as pioneer in cochlear implantation.

Chiong was a recipient of the One University of the Philippines Professorial Chair in Otology & Neurotology for Research and Public Service from 2017 to 2018 and 2019 to 2021.

She is a member Phi Lambda Delta sorority, Phi 1981A, Class 1985, SSE 1984-1985.

In recognition of her dedication to scientific research, Chiong has been awarded, multiple times, as UP SCIENTIST by the University of the Philippines under the Scientific Productivity System. She was appointed UP SCIENTIST 1 in 2011 to 2013 and 2018 to 2020; UP SCIENTIST 2 in 2014 to 2016; and UP SCIENTIST 3 in 2021-2023. ^{[13]}

In 2020, Chiong was named an Academician by the National Academy of Science and Technology.
