= María Orosa =

Filipino chemist (1892–1945)

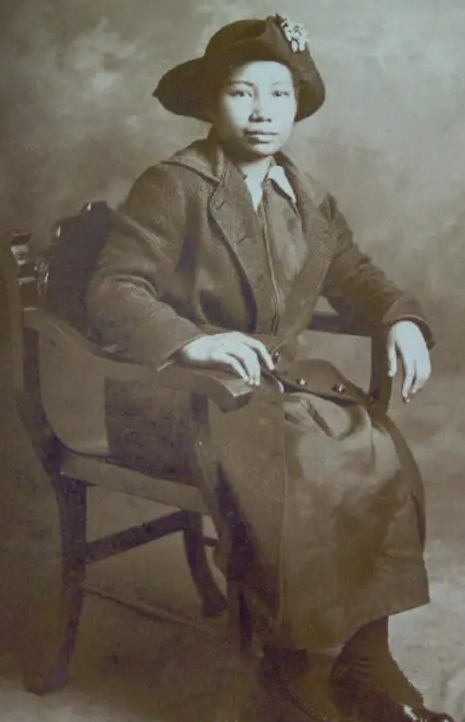
- Born: María Orosa e Ylagan; November 29, 1893; Taal, Batangas, Captaincy General of the Philippines
- Died: February 13, 1945 (aged 51); Manila, Philippine Commonwealth
- Burial place: Malate Catholic School Mass Grave (before 2025); San Agustin Church, Intramuros (since 2025)
- Education: University of the Philippines Manila; University of Washington
- Relatives: Sixto Orosa (brother); Severina de Orosa (sister-in-law); Leonor Orosa-Goquingco (niece); Rosalinda Orosa (niece)

María Orosa e Ylagan (Note: Y is replaced by e before maternal surnames that begin with /i/ immediately followed by a consonant.) (November 29, 1893 – February 13, 1945) was a Filipina food technologist, pharmaceutical chemist, humanitarian, and war heroine. She experimented with foods native to the Philippines, and during World War II developed Soyalac (a nutrient rich drink from soybeans) and darak (cookies made from rice bran, packed with vitamin B-1, which prevents beriberi disease), which she also helped smuggle into Japanese-run internment camps that helped save the lives of thousands of Filipinos, Americans, and other nationals. She invented banana ketchup.

Orosa completed her bachelor's and master's degrees in pharmaceutical chemistry, as well as an additional degree in food chemistry. She was then offered a position as an assistant chemist for the state of Washington before returning to the Philippines in 1922 to focus on addressing the problem of malnutrition in her homeland. She invented many types of food to minimize the need of imported products to feed Filipinos. She took advantage of the abundant natural resources of the Philippine islands such as native fruits, crops and vegetables to make the Philippines self-sufficient.

During World War II, Orosa joined Marking's Guerrillas to fight for Philippines freedom. She invented over 700 recipes during her lifetime, including Soyalac and Darak, which saved thousands of lives during the war. She also invented a process for canning goods for the guerrilla warriors fighting for the liberation of the Philippines. Without her food inventions, thousands of people would have died in internment camps, hospitals, and on the streets.

== Early and family life ==
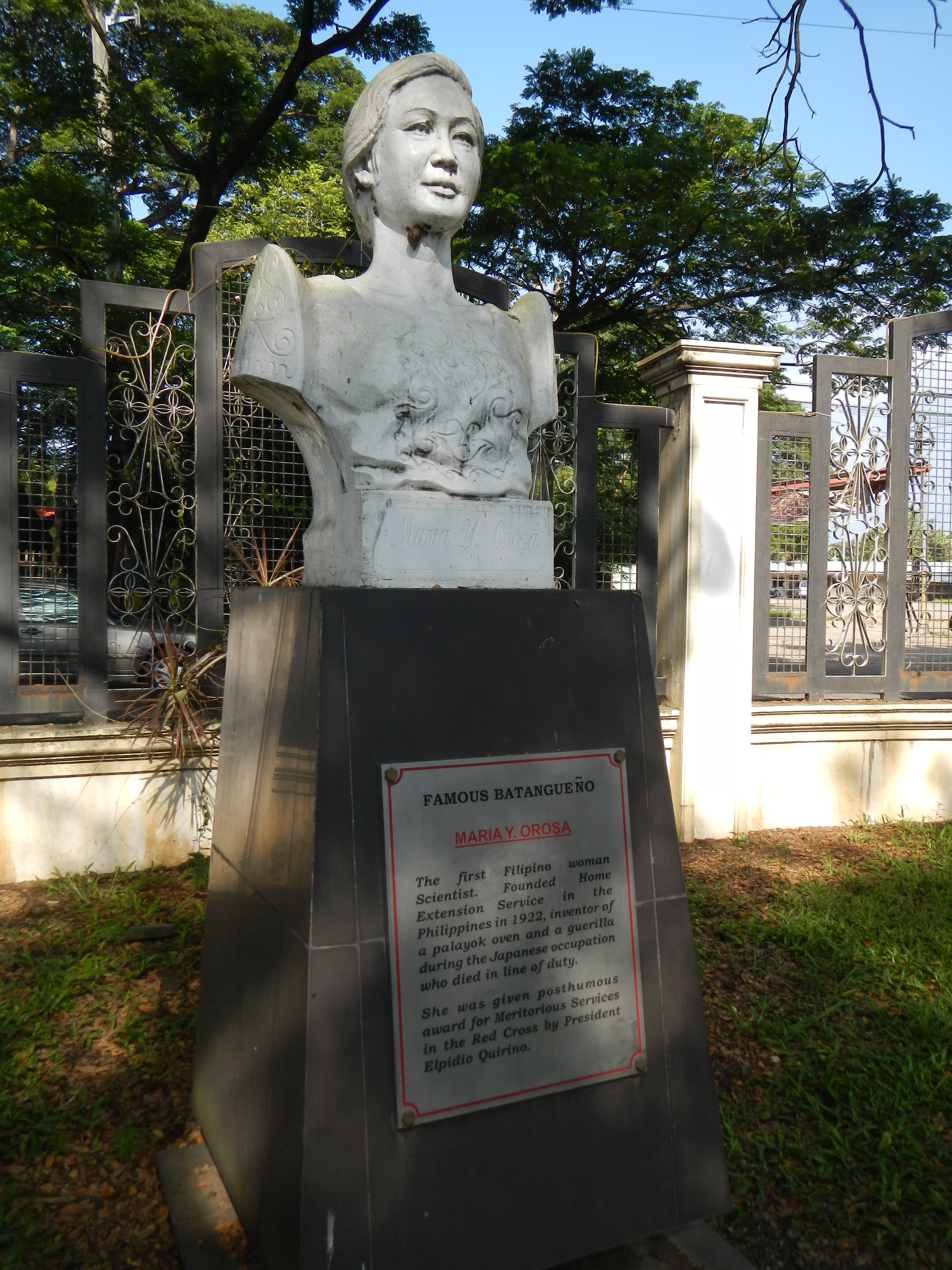
Bust of Maria Orosa at the Batangas Provincial Capitol Complex in Batangas City

Orosa was born on November 29, 1893, in Taal, Batangas, and was the fourth among the eight children of Simplicio A. Orosa and Juliana Ylagan-Orosa. Although her father died when she was still a child (and helped her mother in the family's general store), many of her siblings also became distinguished in the Philippines. Her elder brother, Engr. Vicente Ylagan Orosa Sr., became Secretary of Public Works and Communications, and, later, Chairman of the People’s Homesite and Housing Corporation (PHHC) during the administration of President Ramon Magsaysay. Her brother, Dr. Sixto Ylagan Orosa Sr., became a pioneering doctor, and her nieces and nephews included banker Sixto L. Orosa, Jr., Philippine National Artist in Dance Leonor Orosa Goquiñgco, businessman José R. L. Orosa, award-winning cultural journalist Rosalinda L. Orosa, and her biographer Helen Orosa del Rosario.

After studying at the University of the Philippines, Orosa became a government-sponsored scholar who was sent to the United States in 1916. She enrolled at the University of Washington in Seattle, where she earned a bachelor's and master's degrees in pharmaceutical chemistry, and an additional degree in food chemistry from the University of Washington. She worked in fish canneries in Alaska during her summer breaks in college. There, she learned about factory canning.

== Career ==
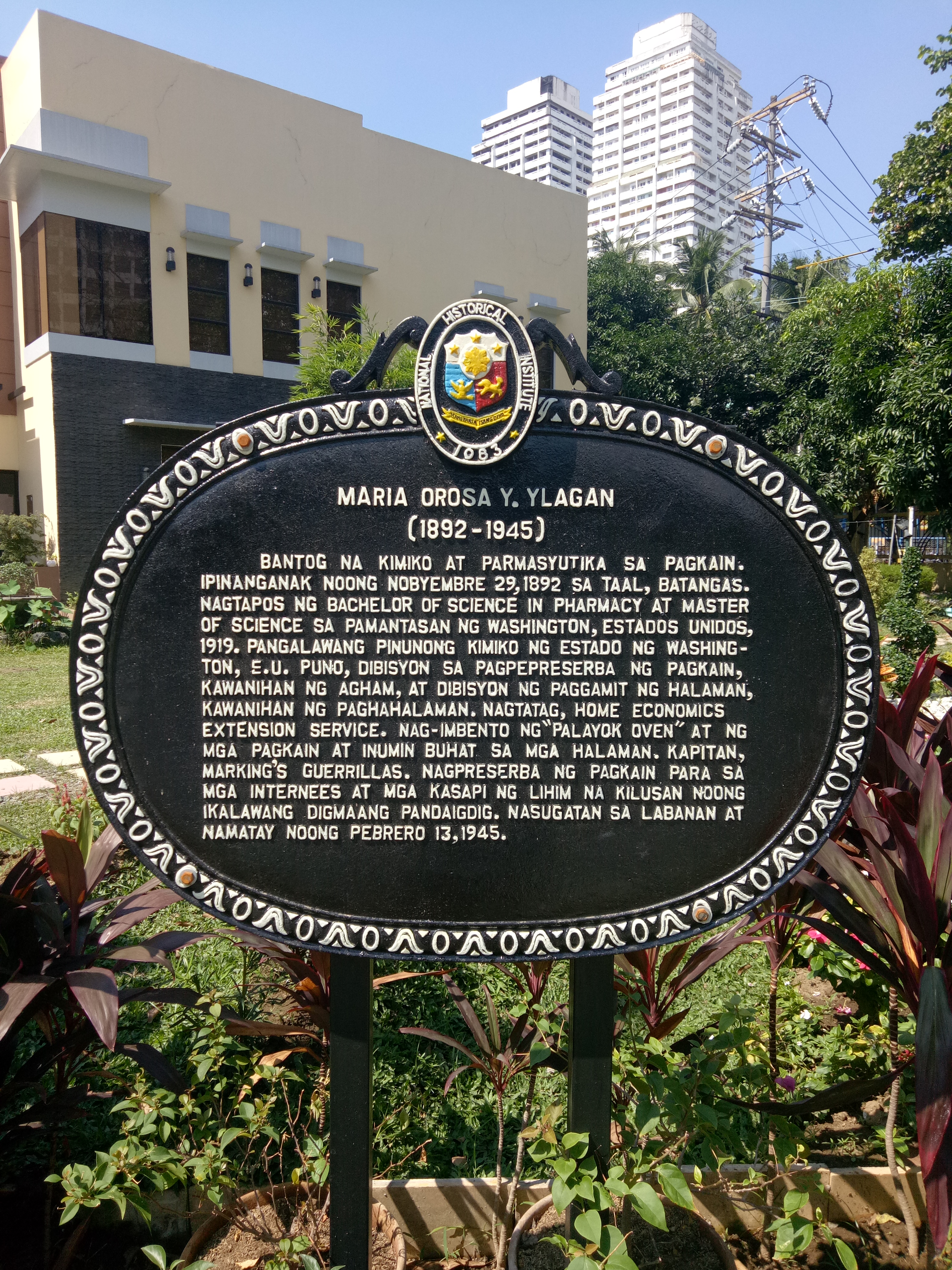
Historical marker commemorating Orosa installed at the Bureau of Plant Industry compound in Malate, Manila

Although offered a job as an assistant chemist by the Washington state government, Orosa returned to the Philippines in 1922. She initially taught home economics at the Centro Escolar University, and later transferred to the Philippine Bureau of Science's food preservation division. Beginning in 1926, Orosa visited China, Japan, Hawaii, Britain, the Netherlands, France, Germany, Italy and Spain to research food technology and preservation. She toured more than 50 canning factories. After she returned to the Philippines, she was appointed the head of the Food Preservation Division and, later, the Home Economics Division of the Bureau of Science. By 1934, Orosa was in charge of the Plant Utilization Division at the Bureau of Plant Industry.

Orosa wanted to help the Philippines become self-sufficient, as well as empower Filipino families. She organized 4-H clubs in the islands (which had more than 22,000 members by 1924), and traveled into the barrios to teach women how to raise chickens, preserve local produce, and plan healthy meals. With the help of this organization, she and numerous protesters visited various communities throughout the Philippines to educate women on innovative methods of food preparation and preservation. Orosa invented the palayók oven to enable families without access to electricity to bake, and developed recipes for local produce, including cassava, bananas, and coconut. Imported tomato ketchup, introduced by the Americans, was popular but expensive. Orosa invented a ketchup made with bananas and other local ingredients, instead of tomatoes. Banana ketchup became a favorite condiment and cooking ingredient in the archipelago. She also developed wines and calamansi nip, a desiccated and powdered form of the citrus fruit used to make reconstituted calamansi juice, banana ketchup, and in other recipes. Using both her local and technical knowledge, Orosa made culinary contributions and taught proper preservation methods for native dishes such as adobo, dinuguan, kilawin and escabeche.

During World War II, Orosa used her food science background to invent Soyalac (a protein-rich powdered soybean product) and Darák (a rice bran powder rich in thiamine and other vitamins which could also treat beri-beri). She also became a captain in Marking's Guerrillas, a Filipino guerrilla group organized by Marcos "Marking" V. Augustín. The guerrillas helped United States forces fight the occupying Imperial Japanese troops, and employed carpenters to insert Soyalac and Darák into hollow bamboo sticks, which were then smuggled to civilians imprisoned at the University of Santo Tomas and in Japanese-run prisoners of war camps in Capas, Tarlac and Corregidor. The powders saved the lives of many starving imprisoned guerrillas and U.S. soldiers. Her "Tiki-Tiki" cookies (also made using Darák) saved many civilian lives during wartime food shortages.

== Death and legacy ==
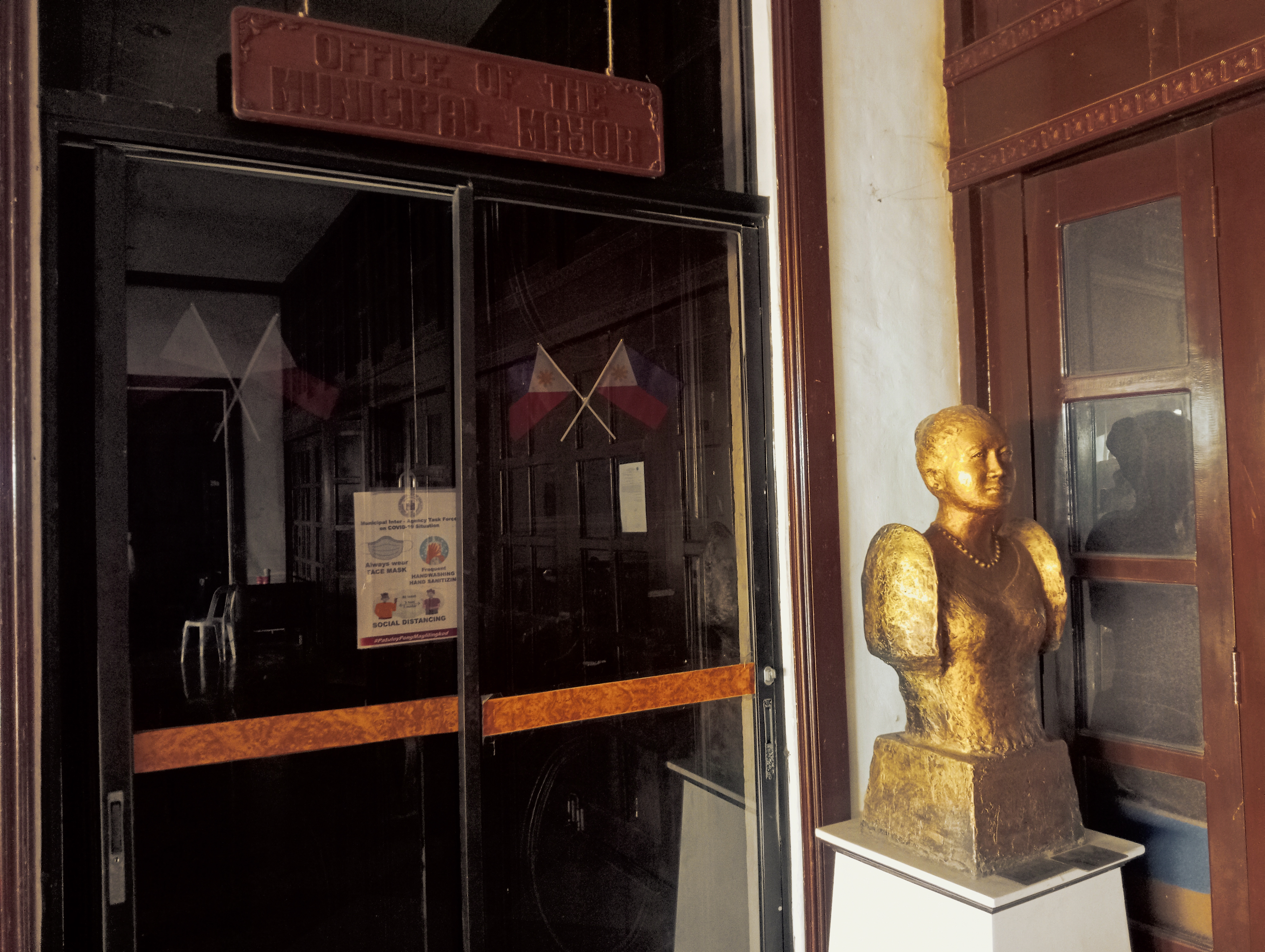
María Orosa bust at the Office of the Municipal Mayor of Taal, Batangas

Although her family and friends urged her to flee Manila for her hometown as American and Filipino forces fought Japanese troops in the Battle of Manila, Orosa refused and insisted that, as a soldier, she had to remain at her post. On February 13, 1945, Orosa was injured by shrapnel wounds in her government office during an American bombing raid. The Remedios Hospital, to which she had been taken was later also bombed, causing a shrapnel shard to pierce her heart and kill her instantly. The American Red Cross posthumously gave Orosa a humanitarian award for her food-smuggling efforts. Her niece Helen Orosa del Rosario in 1970 published Maria Orosa: Her Life and Work, which also included 700 of Orosa's recipes.

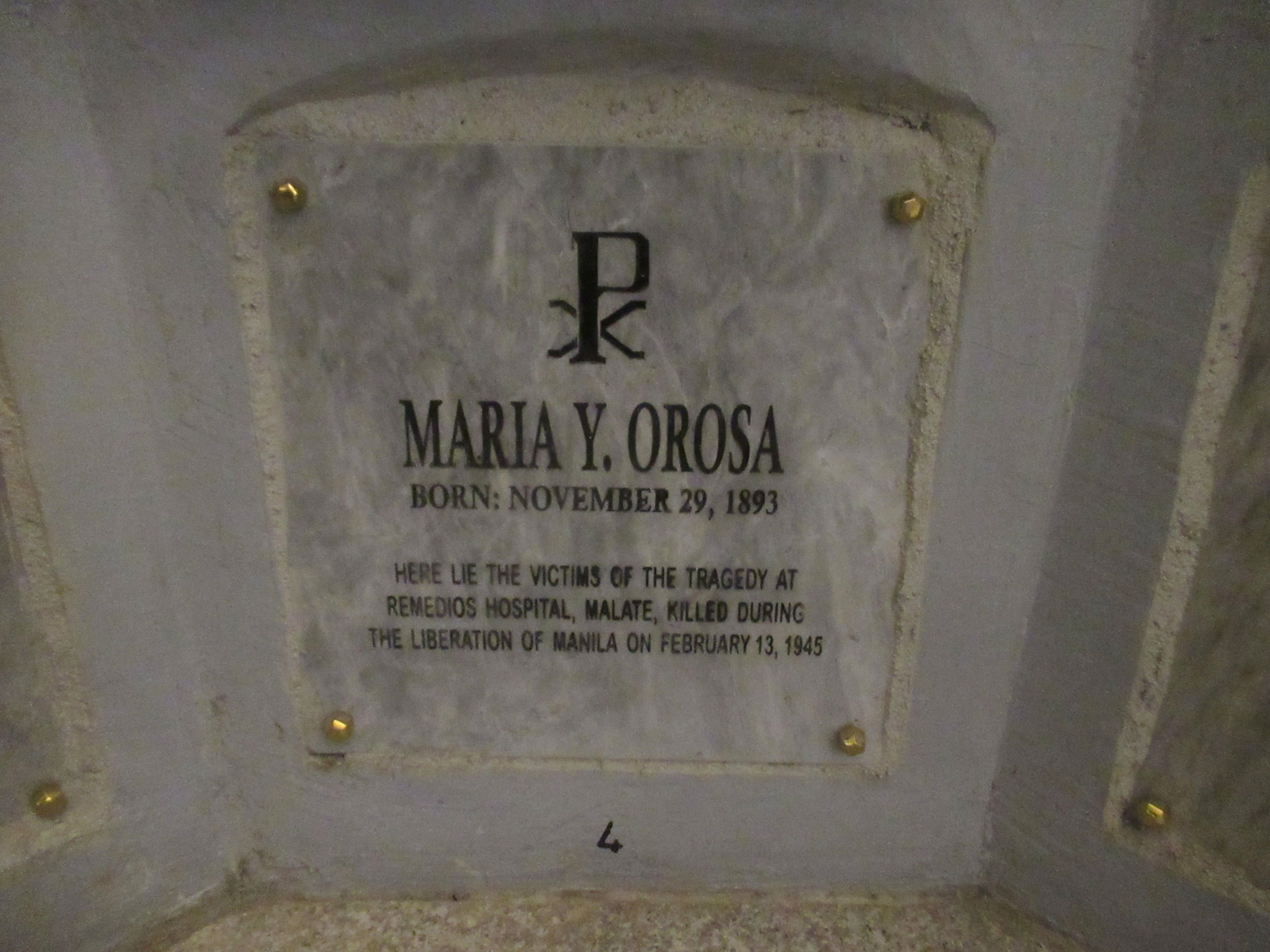
Orosa's niche at San Agustin Church (Manila).

The Philippines has officially recognized Orosa's contributions. Her home province, Batangas, installed a bust and historical marker in her honor. A street in Ermita, Manila is named after her, as is a building in the Bureau of Plant Industry. During the 65th anniversary of the Institute of Science and Technology, she became one of 19 scientists who received special recognition. On November 29, 1983, the National Historical Institute installed a marker in her honor at the Bureau of Plant Industry in Malate, Manila. For the centennial of her birth anniversary, the Philippine Postal Corporation issued a postage stamp in her honor. Her hometown of Taal, Batangas also celebrated the 125th anniversary of her birth on November 29, 2018. On November 29, 2019, Google celebrated her 126th birthday with a Google Doodle.

On February 8, 2020, Orosa's tombstone was found at the Malate Catholic School, the site of the Remedios Hospital during the Second World War. Her remains were reinterred in the crypt of San Agustín Church in Intramuros, Manila, as part of commemorations for the 80th anniversary of the Battle of Manila on February 13, 2025.

== List of works ==
- Preservation of Philippine foods (1926)
- Roselle recipes (1931)
- Rice bran: a health food and how to cook it (1932)
- Soy beans as a component of a balanced diet and how to prepare them (1932)
- Preserve the national culture in local food (1932)
- The Recipes of Maria Y. Orosa

== Sources ==
- Ancheta, Herminia M. and Michaela Beltran-Gonzales, Filipino Women in Nation Building, Phoenix Publishing House Inc., Quezon City, 1984.
- World Cat
- Centro Escolar University (2019) CEU-SNHM Pays Tribute to Filipina Innovator Maria Orosa
- Cite Seer X
- Republic of the Philippines News Agency (2019). Google honors Filipina scientist Maria Orosa.
