= Rosalinda Orosa =

Filipino journalist (1923–2023)

- Born: November 30, 1923 Manila, Philippine Islands
- Died: December 13, 2023 (aged 100)
- Occupation: Journalist
- Language: Filipino, English, Spanish
- Education: University of the Philippines Manila; Radcliffe College
- Notable awards: Premio Zobel
- Parents: Severina de Orosa; Sixto Ylagan Orosa Sr
- Relatives: Leonor Orosa-Goquingco (sister); María Orosa (aunt)

Rosalinda Luna Orosa (November 30, 1923 – December 13, 2023) was a Filipino journalist, Spanish-language writer, and artistic critic. She was a member of the Philippine Academy of the Spanish Language and winner of Premio Zobel. She was a writer at The Manila Times newspaper.

== Early life and education ==
Rosalinda Orosa was born in Manila. Dr. Sixto Ylagan Orosa Sr. and Dr. Severina Luna, her parents, were medical doctors and writers. Her parents served as Christian missionaries in Sulu. Her father founded 17 public hospitals in the Philippines; her mother founded the Kababaihang Rizalista, the Knights of Rizal's female counterpart. Rosalinda had four siblings; two of the most notable were dancer Leonor and banker Sixto Jr. She grew up speaking Spanish with her family.

At age 14, Orosa enrolled at the University of the Philippines Manila to study English Literature. After graduating, she attended Radcliffe College on a scholarship, where she completed a graduate degree in English Literature. She continued her studies in Spanish literature and grammar at the University of Mexico.

== Career ==
After graduating from college, Orosa began working as a proofreader at the Manila Chronicle, where she also served as columnist and remained through the 1950s. Orosa was best known for her music reviews, but she also wrote on theaters as well.

Orosa wrote for several newspaper companies in the Philippines, such as The Manila Times, and Daily Express.

From 1981 until 1984, Orosa was the secretary for the Christian Art Society of the Philippines.

Orosa continued to write into the 21st century. In 2006, she was writing for The Philippine Star columns Sunday Strokes and Table Talk.

In 2011, she published Turning Back the Pages, a book which included reflections on her life.

== Publications ==
=== Books ===
Orosa wrote several books, which compiled essays from both Filipino and foreign writers and academics.

- Tapestry
- Above The Throng: Portraits & Profiles, Sketches & Silhouettes (1980)
- Turning Back the Pages (2011)

=== Articles ===
- Orosa, Rosalinda (1971). "The Guerrilla Theatre in the Philippines". Asian Pacific Quarterly of Cultural and Social Affairs. 3: 43–50.
- Orosa, Rosalinda L (January 1985). "The Press: Eroding or Strengthening Traditional Culture". Media Asia. 12 (1): 7–10. doi:10.1080/01296612.1985.11726167. ISSN 0129-6612.

== Awards and recognitions ==
- 2007. Primer Premio de Periodismo Quijano de Manila (Philippines)
- 2005. Lifetime Achievement Award (Philippines)
- 2001. Order of Merit (France)
- 2001. Cross of Merit (Germany)
- 2000. Women of the Year by the International Biographical Centre of Cambridge (England)
- 1989: Premio Zobel (Philippines)
