= Leonor Orosa-Goquingco =

Filipina dancer (1917–2005)

Leonor Orosa Goquingco
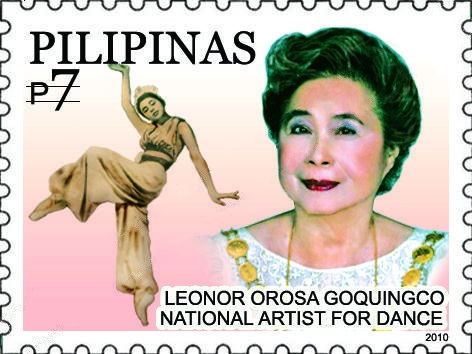
- Born: Leonor Luna Orosa; July 24, 1917; Jolo, Sulu, Philippine Islands
- Died: July 15, 2005 (aged 87)
- Parent(s): Sixto Orosa; Severina Luna
- Relatives: Rosalinda Orosa (sister); María Orosa (aunt)
- Awards: Order of National Artists of the Philippines

Leonor Luna Orosa-Goquingco (July 24, 1917 – July 15, 2005) was a Filipino national artist in creative dance, who was also known for breaking tradition within dance. She played the piano, drew art, designed scenery and costumes, sculpted, acted, directed, danced and choreographed. Her pen name was Cristina Luna and she was known as Trailblazer, Mother of Philippine Theater Dance and Dean of Filipino Performing Arts Critics. She died on July 15, 2005, of cardiac arrest following a cerebro-vascular accident at the age of 87.

== Family ==
Leonor Orosa-Goquingco was born on July 24, 1917, in Jolo, Sulu. She was a Filipino national artist in creative dance. She played the piano, drew art, designed scenery and costumes, sculpted, acted, directed, danced and choreographed. Her pen name was Cristina Luna and she was known as Trailblazer, Mother of Philippine Theater Dance and Dean of Filipino Performing Arts Critics. She died on July 15, 2005, of cardiac arrest following a cerebro-vascular accident at the age of 87. Her parents were Sixto Orosa and Severina Luna, both physicians who graduated from the University of the Philippines. She was married to Benjamin Goquinco and had three children: Benjamin, Jr., Rachelle and Regina.

== Education ==
Goquingco graduated Elementary in 1929 at Central Philippine University and as the top of her class as valedictorian in Negros Occidental Provincial High School. She moved to Manila and entered the Philippine Women's University (PWU) where she took an ACS course. She earned a diploma in education, majoring in English Literature from St. Scholastica's College Manila and graduated summa cum laude. The famous national artist also took graduate courses in theatre craft, drama and music at Columbia University and Teachers College in New York City, US. She also took professional and teacher courses at the Ballet de Monte Carlo.

== Accomplishments ==
=== Dance ===
In 1939, Leonor Orosa-Goquingco was the only dancer sent on the first cultural mission to Japan, at the age of 19. She produced Circling the Globe (1939) and Dance Panorama in the same year. She created The Elements in 1940, the first ballet choreographed by a Filipino to commissioned music. She also created Sports during the same year, featuring cheerleaders, a tennis match and a basketball game. The first Philippine folkloric ballet, Trend: Return to the Native, was choreographed by Goquingco in 1941. After the Second World War, she organized the Philippine Ballet and brought the famous Filipino novel, Noli Me Tángere, to life. The Noli Dance Suite consisted of several dances. Maria Clara and the Leper, Salome and Elias, Sisa, Asalto for Maria Clara and The Gossips are some of the dances found in the Noli Dance Suite.

Leonor Orosa-Goquingco also danced during her early years. She danced at the American Museum of Natural History, Theresa Kaufmann Auditorium, The International House and Rockefeller Plaza, just to name a few. She appeared in War Dance and Planting Rice. Other works she choreographed were "Circling the Globe", "Dance Panorama", "Current events", "Vinta!", "Morolandia", "Festival in Maguindanao", "Eons Ago: The Creation", "Filipinescas: Philippine Life, Legend, and Lore in Dance", "Miner's Song", "The Bird and the Planters", "Tribal", "Ang Antipos" (The Flagellant), "Salubong", "Pabasa" (Reading of the Pasyon) and "Easter Sunday Fiesta". As a choreographer, she is noted for her courage in breaking traditions in dance despite public indifference. These innovations inevitably revolutionized the folk dances.

She founded the Filipinescas Dance Company in 1958, and took it on a world tour in 1961, 1962, 1964, 1966, 1968 and 1970. This dance company, along with the Bayanihan Philippine Dance company and Francisca Reyes Aquino, are considered to be of the exponents in the development of contemporary Philippine folkloric dance.

=== Writing ===
She was also a writer, and her articles were published in Dance Magazine (New York City), Enciclopedia Della Spettacolo (Rome), Grove's Dictionary of Music and Musicians (London), Arts of Asia (Hong Kong) and the Philippine Cultural Foundation. She wrote Dances of the Emerald Isles and Filipinescas: Philippine Life, Legend and Lore in Dance. On Dances of the Emerald Isles, Teodoro A. Agoncillo called it "a towering contribution to Philippine cultural history."

Leonor Orosa-Goquingco also wrote a poem on the Japanese occupation, Lifted the Smoke of Battle. She is famous for her one-act play, Her Son, Jose Rizal which is set during the time Rizal was imprisoned and awaiting his execution. It reveals the emotions going through Rizal's mother at that time and the similarities between Rizal's life and that of Jesus Christ.

Goquinco was also a critic who wrote reviews. She critiqued works like Tony Perez' Oktubre, Ligaya Amilbangsa's Stillness and Tanghalang Pilipino's Aguinaldo: 1898.

== Awards ==
- Patnubay ng Sining at Kalinangan Award in 1969 and 1964
- Rizal Centennial Award in 1962
- Republic Cultural Heritage Award in 1964
- Presidential Award of Merit in 1970
- Tandang Sora Award and the Columbia University Alumni Association Award in 1975
- National Artist for Dance on March 27, 1976

== Positions ==
She was an Honorary Chairman of the Association of Ballet Academies of the Philippines, the founding member of the Philippine Ballet Theatre (PBT) and was known as a Zontian and a performing arts critic and columnist of the Manila Bulletin.
