= Philippine Genome Center =

Research facility in Quezon City, Philippines

- Established: 2009; 17 years ago
- Research type: Basic and Applied
- Field of research: Genomics
- Director: Cynthia Saloma
- Location: Quezon City, Philippines; 14°39′06″N 121°04′18″E
- Affiliations: University of the Philippines Diliman
- Website: pgc.up.edu.ph
- Location within Metro Manila Location within Luzon Location within Philippines

The Philippine Genome Center (PGC) is a multi-disciplinary research facility in Quezon City, Metro Manila, Philippines which specializes in genomics.

== History ==
The Philippine Genome Center was established as a collaboration between the University of the Philippines and the Department of Science and Technology (DOST). It was first conceptualized in 2009 in response to the SARS outbreak which affected Hong Kong, the dengue outbreaks which affecting the Philippines, and the then-ongoing H1N1 flu pandemic which originated in Mexico. The first grants received by the PGC were for dengue diagnostic testing and H1N1 surveillance. Initially the facility was placed under the jurisdiction of the University of the Philippines (UP) Diliman's Office of the President as per the approval of the UP Board of Regents in its July 31, 2009 meeting.

The PGC was formally launched on November 28, 2011. In the beginning, the center operated virtually. From January 2013 until the opening of its building on September 11, 2019, it was temporarily housed at the National Institute of Molecular Biology and Biotechnology at UP Diliman

To make DNA sequencing and bioinformatics services accessible to Filipino researchers, the DNA Sequencing Core Facility (DSCF) and Core Facility for Bioinformatics (CFB) were established with funding support from the DOST. On February 26, 2016, the UP Board of Regents approved the transfer of management and supervision of the PGC from the university's Office of the President to the Office of the Vice President for Academic Affairs

In 2019, PGC Mindanao and PGC Visayas were established as satellite offices in Mindanao and Visayas respectively.

=== COVID-19 pandemic in the Philippines ===
In January 2020, the PGC in collaboration with UP Manila National Institutes of Health developed an RT-PCR SARS CoV-2 detection kit.

In April 2020, the Department of Health has set the Philippine Genome Center as the 18th coronavirus testing hub. It was also tasked to conduct genomic sequencing of COVID-19 samples. In July 2021, PGC Mindanao and PGC Visayas was also given the task of detecting new variants with the plan on giving them machines to conduct genome sequencing. In September 2021, the PGC has shifted its focus towards detecting new COVID-19 variants in the country and less focus on conducting RT-PCR tests.

== Facilities ==
The PGC has two "core facilities"; the Core Facility for Bioinformatics (CFB) and the DNA Sequencing Core Facility (DSCF). A biobank is planned as PGC's third facility. The two facilities were funded by a ₱100 million (US$2.2 million) grant over three years from the Philippine Council for Industry, Energy and Emerging Technology Research and Development (PCIEERD) of the Department of Science and Technology.

=== DNA Sequencing Core Facility ===
Opened on September 24, 2013 The DNA Sequencing Core Facility (DSCF) was the first core facility to open. Genomic studies in the field of agriculture, biodiversity, forensics, health, and ethnicity are conducted in the DSCF with the intent to specifically cater to Filipino needs. DNA and genome sequencing services are provided at the DSCF.

=== Core Facility for Bioinformatics ===
The Core Facility for Bioinformatics (CFB) is a facility that provides genome-scale data generation and analysis to local researchers in the academe, from government institutions and private organizations. It also provides genomic data storage. It is also augmented by an IBM Blue Gene supercomputer which is also used by the Philippine Atmospheric, Geophysical and Astronomical Services Administration (PAGASA) and Project Nationwide Operational Assessment of Hazards (Project NOAH) for weather forecast and climate change modelling purposes in addition to genomic research use. The CFB was launched on April 14, 2014 while the supercomputer was made operational within the same day.

=== Diagnostics and laboratory services ===
PGC Mindanao provides various diagnostics and laboratory services to local researchers and laboratories. These services involve sample preparation, Spectrophotometry, Fluorometry, Polymerase Chain Reaction, Electrophoresis, Flow cytometry and various other bioinformatics and laboratory services.

The advanced equipment of PGC Mindanao are housed temporarily in the different laboratories of CSM: Biotechnology, Molecular Biology and Extraction Laboratory.

== Directors ==
- Amelia Guevara (2009–2011)
- Carmencita Padilla (2011–2016)
- Cynthia Saloma (2017–2025)
