= Carmencita Padilla =

Filipino clinical geneticist and pediatrician

Carmencita Padilla ONS
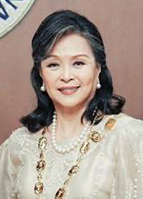

8th Chancellor of University of the Philippines Manila
- In office November 1, 2014 – October 31, 2023
- Preceded by: Manuel B. Agulto
- Succeeded by: Michael L. Tee

2nd Executive Director of the Philippine Genome Center
- In office 2011–2016
- Preceded by: Amelia Guevara
- Succeeded by: Cynthia Saloma

Personal details
- Born: Carmencita M. David
- Education: University of the Philippines Diliman (BS); University of the Philippines Manila (Medicine and Master's)
- Known for: Newborn screening advocacy
- Awards: Order of National Scientists of the Philippines (2023)
- Medical career
- Field: Medical genetics; Pediatrics
- Institutions: University of the Philippines Manila; National Institutes of Health (Philippines); Philippine Genome Center

Carmencita M. David-Padilla is a Filipino clinical geneticist and pediatrician who is recognized as a National Scientist of the Philippines.

== Education ==
Dra. Padilla accomplished her pre-medicine degree at the University of the Philippines (UP) Diliman in 1976. She moved to the UP Manila campus where she finished her degree in Doctor of Medicine in 1981. Dra. Padilla completed a fellowship in clinical genetics at the Royal Alexandra Hospital for Children in Australia. She returned to Manila to practice pediatric and genetic medicine. In 2005, she obtain a Master's Degree in Health Policy Studies (MHPS) at UP Manila.

== Career ==
=== Newborn screening ===
Dra. Padilla is a leading advocate for newborn screening. She and her colleagues helped to establish the Newborn Screening System (NBS) in the Philippines, which began as a data gathering project in Metro Manila in 1996. She is the founding president of the Newborn Screening Society of the Philippines.

=== Philippine Genome Center ===
Padilla helped in the establishment of the Philippine Genome Center in 2009, where she also served as executive director from 2011 to 2016.

=== UP Manila ===
The University of the Philippines Manila has Padilla as its chancellor since 2014 and has been serving for at least three terms. Her term ended in October 31, 2023. She was a professor in pediatrics in the institution. She also helped set up a genetic services department in UP Manila in 1990.

=== Other institutions ===
Padilla would also aid in founding a clinical services department at the Philippine General Hospital and laboratories at the National Institutes of Health's Institute of Human Genetics.

=== Contributions to legislation ===
Padilla contributed on forming the basis of The Newborn Screening Act of 2004 (Republic Act No. 9288), with her knowledge on clinical genetics and her research on newborn screening. Her work would also help draft the Rare Diseases Act of 2016 (Republic Act No. 10747).

== Honors and recognition ==
On August 31, 2023, Padilla was conferred the Order of National Scientists by President Bongbong Marcos for her contributions in the field of medicine. The following year, she was a laureate of the Asian Scientist 100 by the Asian Scientist.
