= Severina de Orosa =

Filipino doctor (1890–1984)

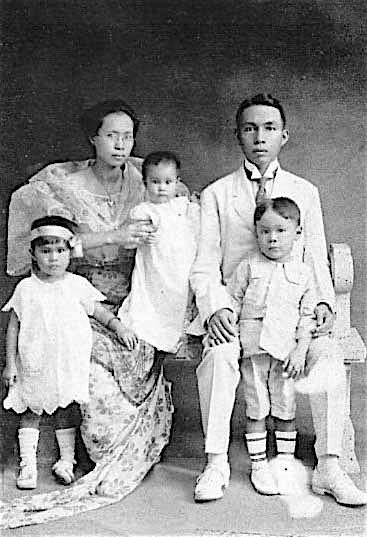
- Dr. Severina Luna de Orosa (left) and her husband Dr. Sixto Y Orosa (sitting right) with 3 of their children in 1920
- Born: Severina Luna y Dinglasan; 11 February 1890; Batangas, Captaincy General of the Philippines, Spanish Empire
- Died: 23 May 1984 (aged 94); Manila, Philippines
- Occupations: Physician, writer
- Spouse: Sixto Orosa (died 1981)
- Children: 5, including Leonor and Rosalinda

Severina Dinglasan Luna-Orosa (Spanish: Severina Luna de Orosa y Dinglasan; 11 February 1890 – 23 May 1984) was a Filipino physician and Hispanist writer. She was one of the earliest female Filipina doctors in the country. She was awarded the Premio Zobel literary prize in 1982, 23 years after her husband Sixto Y. Orosa won the same award. Two of her five children were choreographer Leonor Orosa-Goquingco and writer Rosalinda Orosa.

== Early life and education ==
Severina was born in Batangas in the Spanish Philippines on 11 February 1890, the daughter of Batangas municipality councilman Remigio Luna and Rafaela Dinglasan. In 1914, she graduated as valedictorian from the University of the Philippines College of Medicine (UP) in Manila, becoming one of the first female physicians in the Philippines. Her class initially started with 32 students but only 9 graduated by the end of the course. She met her future husband Sixto Y. Orosa in her class who graduated salutatorian.

== Career ==
From 1914 to 1915, she taught medical zoology and protozoology at UP.

In 1916, she and her husband moved to Jolo (Sulu), as the first Christian doctors to introduce Western medicine in a predominantly Muslim area. She collaborated with her husband in the public hospital of Sulu, of which he was director and chief surgeon, working as an obstetrician, pediatrician, bacteriologist, anesthesiologist, laboratory technician, and assistant surgeon. In a 1917 report by the United States Department of War, Severina de Orosa was listed as an assistant resident physician at the public hospital of Sulu. The couple worked in the Sulu area until 1926, during this time her husband published an anthropological book titled The Sulu Archipelago and Its People in 1923. In 1926, Severina was appointed physician for the city schools of Manila and later became the chief of the maternity and children's hospital in Bacolod.

Orosa was also an active writer in Spanish, Tagalog and English; she frequently authored articles to the Philippines Herald and was nicknamed the “First Filipino Columnist” by the paper's editor, Modesto Farolan. She also wrote a play about the consequences of sexual promiscuity and sexually transmitted infections called Almost Within Grasp. She authored the book Sex Education in the Home, which emphasised the importance of teaching sex education by parents to their children. Other books that she worked on were based on the Filipino national hero José Rizal, in Rizal and the Filipino Women and Rizal: Man and Hero.

== Death ==
She died on May 23, 1984, at the age of 94. She was survived by her five children. A marker in her honor was unveiled on December 20, 1990, at the Luna-Orosa Building in Ermita, Manila.

== Awards and honours ==
- She was awarded the Premio Zobel literary prize in 1982, 23 years after her husband, Sixto Y. Orosa, won the same award. Her daughter, the writer Rosalina Orosa, also won the award in 1989.

== See also ==
- Honoria Acosta-Sison
- Fe del Mundo
