= Gelia T. Castillo =

Filipino sociologist (1928–2017)

Gelia T. Castillo ONS
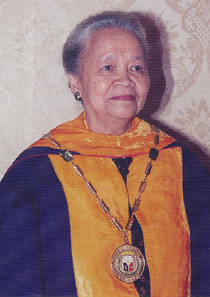
- Official portrait, National Academy of Science and Technology
- Born: Gelia Tagumpay; March 3, 1928; Pagsanjan, Laguna
- Died: August 5, 2017 (aged 89)
- Education: University of the Philippines Diliman; Pennsylvania State University; Cornell University
- Awards: Order of National Scientists of the Philippines (1999); TOFIL Award (2004)
- Scientific career
- Fields: Rural sociology
- Workplaces: University of the Philippines Los Baños

Gelia Tagumpay Castillo (March 3, 1928 – August 5, 2017) was a Filipino sociologist. She specialized in rural sociology and was a pioneer of the concept of participatory development. She was a university professor at the University of the Philippines Los Baños. Her 1977 book Beyond Manila examined rural development in the Philippines. She was named a National Scientist of the Philippines in 1999.

== Early life and education ==
Gelia Tagumpay was born in Pagsanjan, Laguna on March 3, 1928. She graduated from Laguna High School as valedictorian in 1948.

She earned her AB in psychology from the University of the Philippines Diliman, graduating magna cum laude in 1953. She earned an MS in rural sociology from Pennsylvania State University the same year. She went on to study at Cornell University, earning her PhD in rural sociology in 1960.

== Career ==
Castillo taught at University of the Philippines Los Baños. In 1953, she was hired by the University of the Philippines, teaching sociology and psychology in the College of Agriculture's Department of Agricultural Education until 1957. She became an assistant professor in 1960, an associate professor in 1966, and a full professor in 1972. She held the rank of university professor from 1988 until she retired in 1993. She was named a professor emeritus the same year.

Castillo specialized in rural sociology and examined agricultural and rural development in the Philippines. As a social scientist, her activities centered on inequality, health, capacity development, gender, and the environment. She was a pioneer of the concept of participatory development. She published widely, addressing topics such as rice and potato agriculture, the role of women, the administration of agricultural schools, the protein gap, the sex roles of adolescents in the Philippines, agricultural school administration, and approaches to community development.

Castillo's 1975 book All in a Grain of Rice concerned rural farmers' responses to changing technology in agriculture. Her 1977 book Beyond Manila analyzed rural development alongside local needs and issues. The book was her most famous and examined the roles of education, income distribution, employment, and migration in rural areas.

Castillo served on the governing board of the International Development Research Centre of Canada from 1979 to 1990. She was a visiting scientist at the International Rice Research Institute in the mid-1980s and served as a consultant for the institute from 1994 to 2013. She chaired the board of the International Potato Center and was a trustee of the Philippine Institute for Development Studies.

Castillo was named a National Academician in 1983 and a National Scientist of the Philippines in 1999.

== Death and legacy ==
Castillo died on August 5, 2017.

A hybrid of Hibiscus rosa-sinensis was named after her in 2000, Hibiscus rosa-sinensis 'Gelia T. Castillo'. The Gelia Castillo Award for Research on Social Innovations in Health was established in 2020.

== Personal life ==
Castillo married Leopoldo S. Castillo, an animal nutritionist. They had three children–Evello (Bobby), Gertrudes, and Nina.

== Selected bibliography ==
- All in a Grain of Rice (1975)
- The Filipino Woman as Manpower (1976)
- Beyond Manila (1977)
- Rice in our Life (2006)
