= University of the Philippines College of Medicine =

Medical college in the Philippines

- Unibersidad ng Pilipinas; Kolehiyo ng Medisina
- Motto: Agham, Kalinangan, Damdamin (Science, Culture, Empathy)
- Type: Public medical school
- Established: 1905 (as the Philippine Medical School); 1908 (integrated into the U.P. System as the College of Medicine and Surgery)
- Parent institution: University of the Philippines Manila
- Chancellor: Michael L. Tee, MD, MHPED
- President: Angelo A. Jimenez
- Dean: Charlotte M. Chiong, M.D., PhD
- Location: Fernando Calderon Hall, Pedro Gil Street, Ermita, Manila, Philippines
- Website: cm.upm.edu.ph

The University of the Philippines College of Medicine (UPCM) is a medical school of the University of the Philippines Manila, the oldest constituent university of the University of the Philippines system. Its establishment in 1905 antedates the foundation of the UP System and makes it one of the oldest medical schools in the country. The Philippine General Hospital, the national university hospital, serves as its teaching hospital.

== History ==
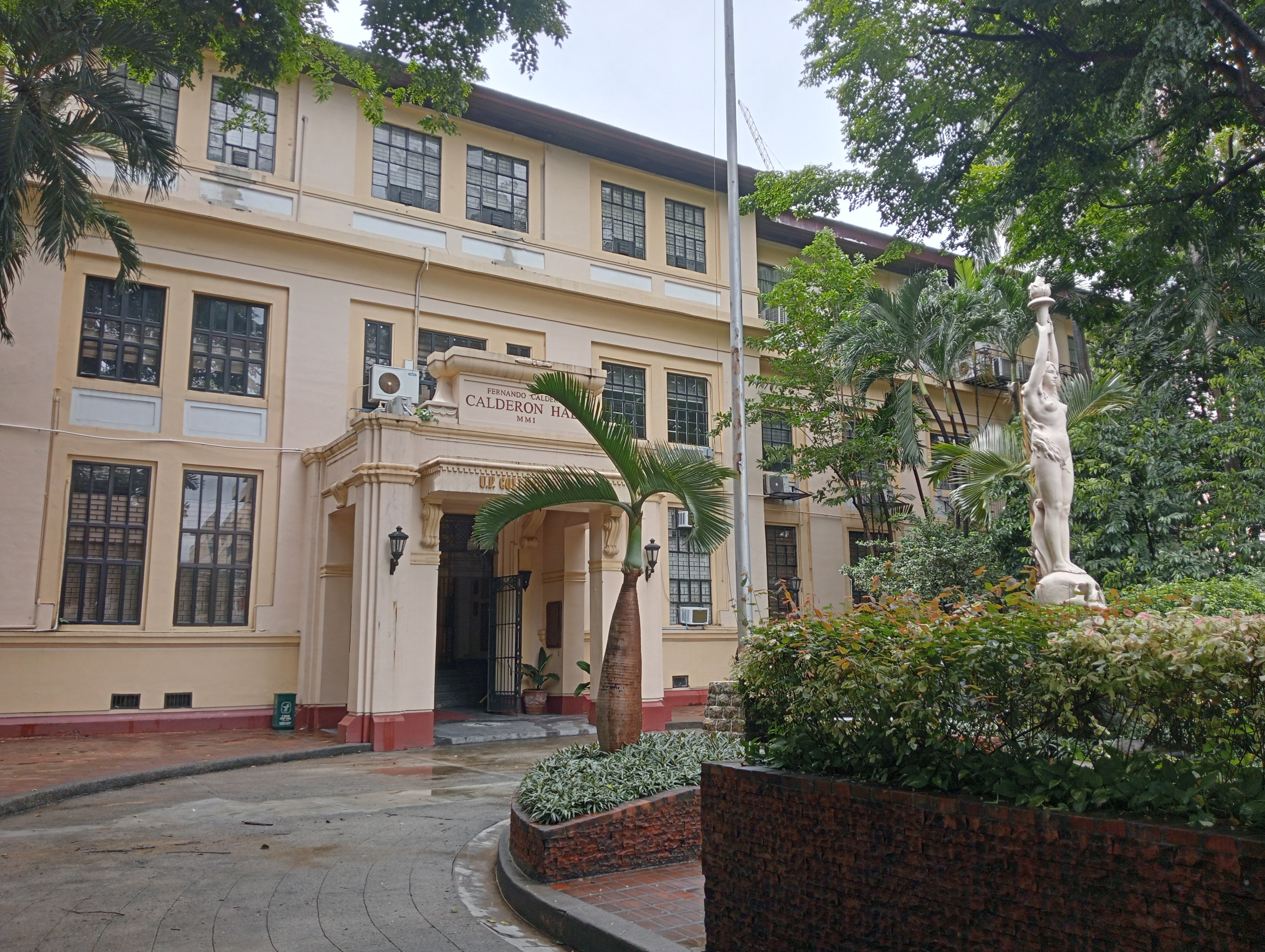
The Calderon Hall is currently the main building of UP College of Medicine students.

The Philippine Medical School was built in 1905 at the former Malecon Drive (now Bonifacio Drive). In 1910, it was integrated as one of the colleges into the University of the Philippines and was renamed to U.P. College of Medicine and Surgery. The name was later shortened to the University of the Philippines College of Medicine. Its first Dean was Dr. Paul Freer, while Dr. Fernando Calderon, an alumnus of the University of Santo Tomas Faculty of Medicine and Surgery, became the first Filipino Dean of the college.

The Fernando Calderon Hall is the main building of UP College of Medicine students. Named after the first Filipino dean of the college, the building was transferred from Bonifacio Drive to its current location in Pedro Gil Street, Manila in 1910.

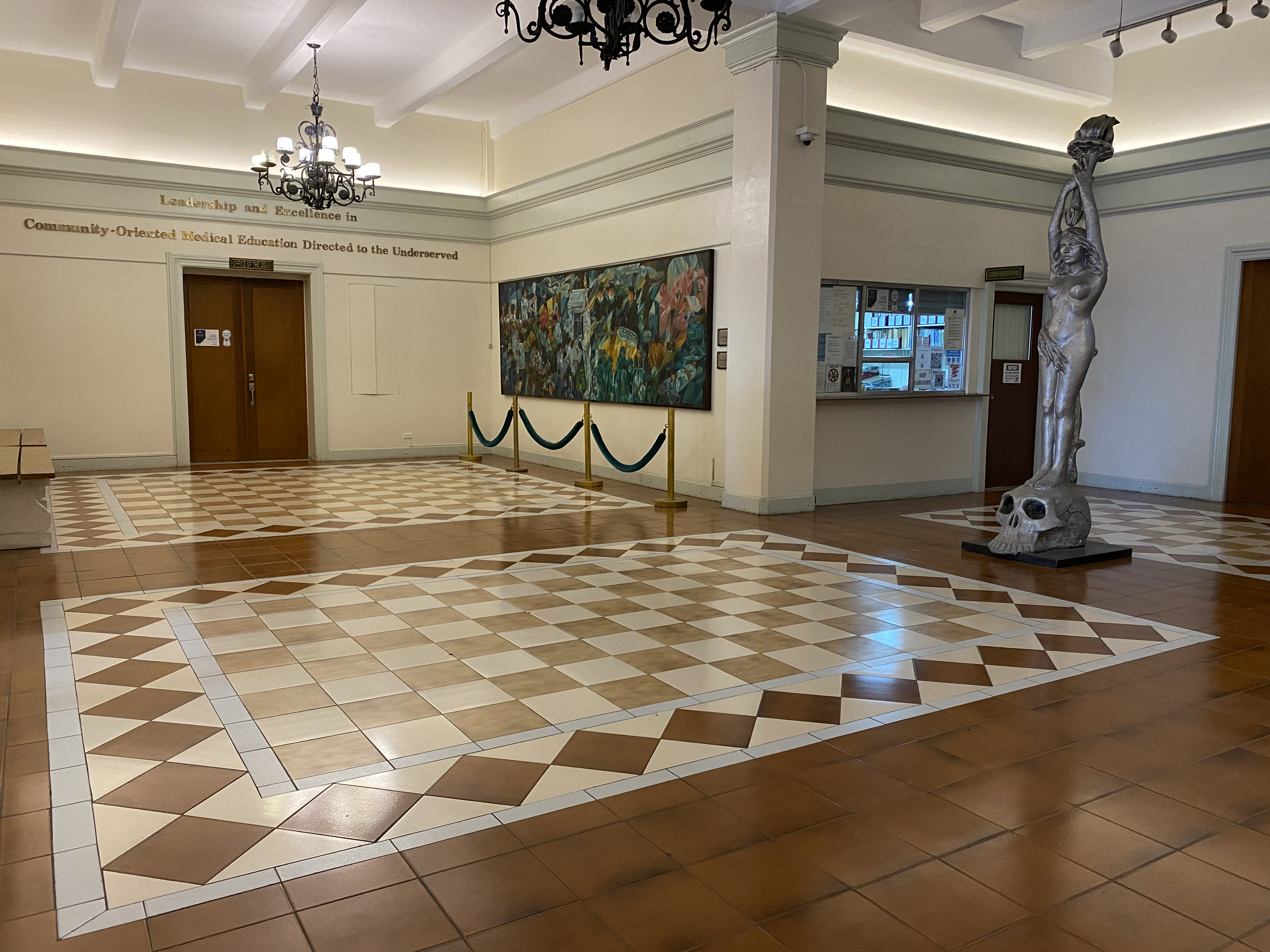
Lobby of the Calderon Hall

The Calderon Hall and the University of the Philippines College of Medicine was the only UP unit that was open and functional during the height of the Second World War, to provide medical services needed during that time. After the War, the building was rehabilitated in 1951 under the leadership of Dr. Agerico Sison.

The University of the Philippines Health Sciences Center was established in 1967. The center was established by law to provide training and research in the various health sciences. It became an autonomous member of the University of the Philippines System in 1979. The center was further renamed University of the Philippines Manila in 1982. In 1983, U.P. Manila was reorganized to conform to the other autonomous universities of the U.P. System.

The U.P. College of Medicine is one of nine resident degree-granting units of the University of the Philippines Manila.

== Performance ==
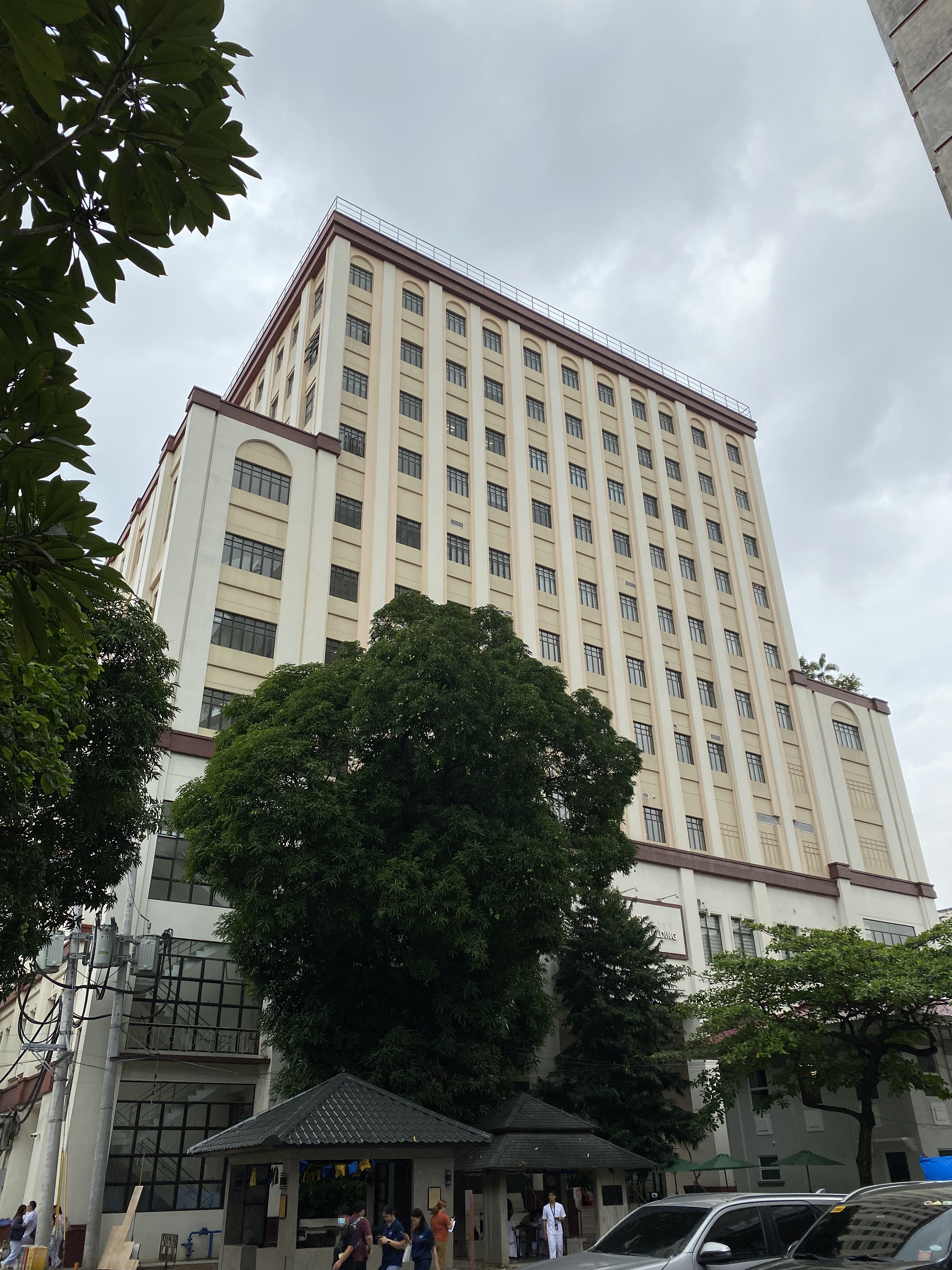
Henry Sy, Sr. Medical Sciences Building

The college is proclaimed as a "Center of Excellence" in the field of Medical Education by the Commission on Higher Education. It has produced several topnotchers in the National Licensure Examination (Medical Board Examination) for Filipino physicians.

== Academic programs ==
The college offers the following academic degree programs:

- Undergraduate program
  - Bachelor of Science in Basic Medical Sciences (for direct entrants of the Integrated Liberal Arts and Medicine Program)
- Professional program
  - Doctor of Medicine
- Graduate programs
  - Master in Orthopedics
  - Master in Clinical Audiology
  - Master of Science in Basic Medical Sciences
  - Master of Science in Biochemistry
  - Master of Science in Epidemiology (Clinical Epidemiology)
  - Master of Science in Bioethics
  - Master of Science in Clinical Medicine
    - Major in Child Health
    - Major in Family and Community Health
    - Major in Medical Oncology
    - Major in Obstetrics and Gynecology
    - Major in Surgery
  - Master of Science in Pharmacology
  - Master in Science in Physiology
  - Master of Science in Health Informatics (Medical Informatics track) (in partnership with College of Arts and Sciences)
  - Doctor of Philosophy in Biochemistry
  - MD-PhD in Molecular Medicine

The college holds postgraduate courses, medical conferences, and training workshops for medical professionals and health workers.

== Admission and Curriculum ==
The U.P. College of Medicine has a seven-year medical curriculum, the Integrated Liberal Arts and Medicine (INTARMED) Program, ultimately leading to the degree of doctor of medicine (M.D.). Its medicine proper (Learning Units III to VII) is designed with an Organ Systems Integration (OSI) curriculum beginning in 2009.

There are two entry points to the College of Medicine: "Learning Unit I" after earning a high school diploma, and "Learning Unit III" (First Year Medicine Proper) after obtaining a baccalaureate degree. Effective school year 2009–2010, all applicants are required to sign a Return Service Agreement.

=== Learning Unit I ===
High school graduates who have met the requirements for admission to the University of the Philippines System are eligible for admission to "LU I". Applications are coursed through the University of the Philippines System General Admission Process. The "LU I Intarmed" students are selected from the top 50 male and top 50 female college freshmen qualifiers (ranked according to their University Predicted Grade (UPG) who indicated in the U.P. College Admission Test (UPCAT) application form their interest in Intarmed. Only 50 applicants/Direct Entrants (25 males and 25 females) will finally be admitted into the program following a selection process which includes an interview.

=== Learning Unit III (First Year Medicine Proper) ===
Only applicants who have obtained their baccalaureate degree (Bachelor in Science or Arts) by the end of a Philippine school year are eligible. The applicant must have a valid National Medical Admission Test (NMAT) score not lower than 90 percentile. The applicants would then be trimmed down by a rigorous selection process to the final 150 Lateral Entrants for LU III.

Due to the program's two entry points, Direct Entrants are joined by the Lateral Entrants as both groups enter LU III. This results in one class of about 200 students in medicine proper.

== Facilities ==
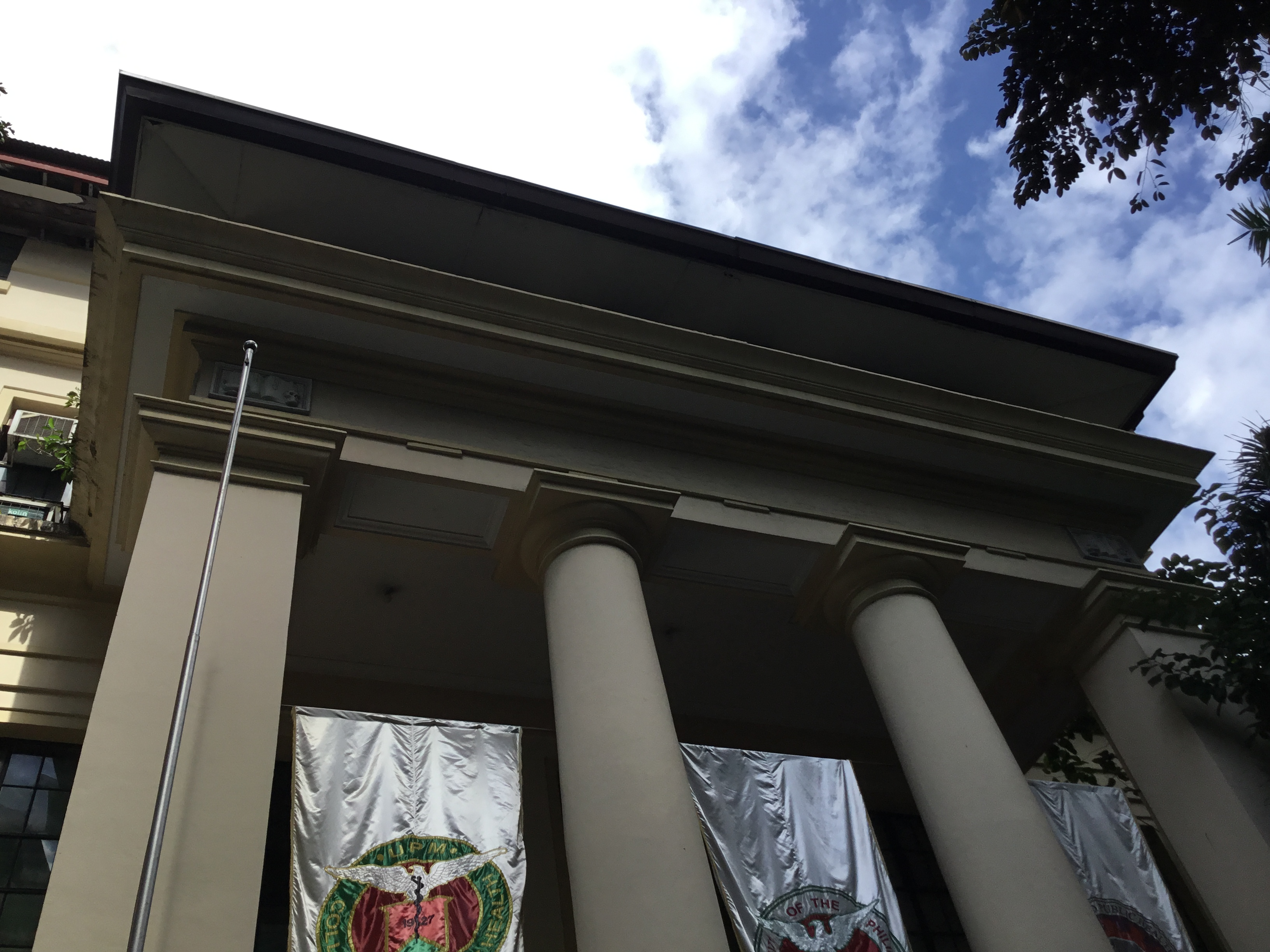
Hilario D. Lara Hall, College of Public Health.

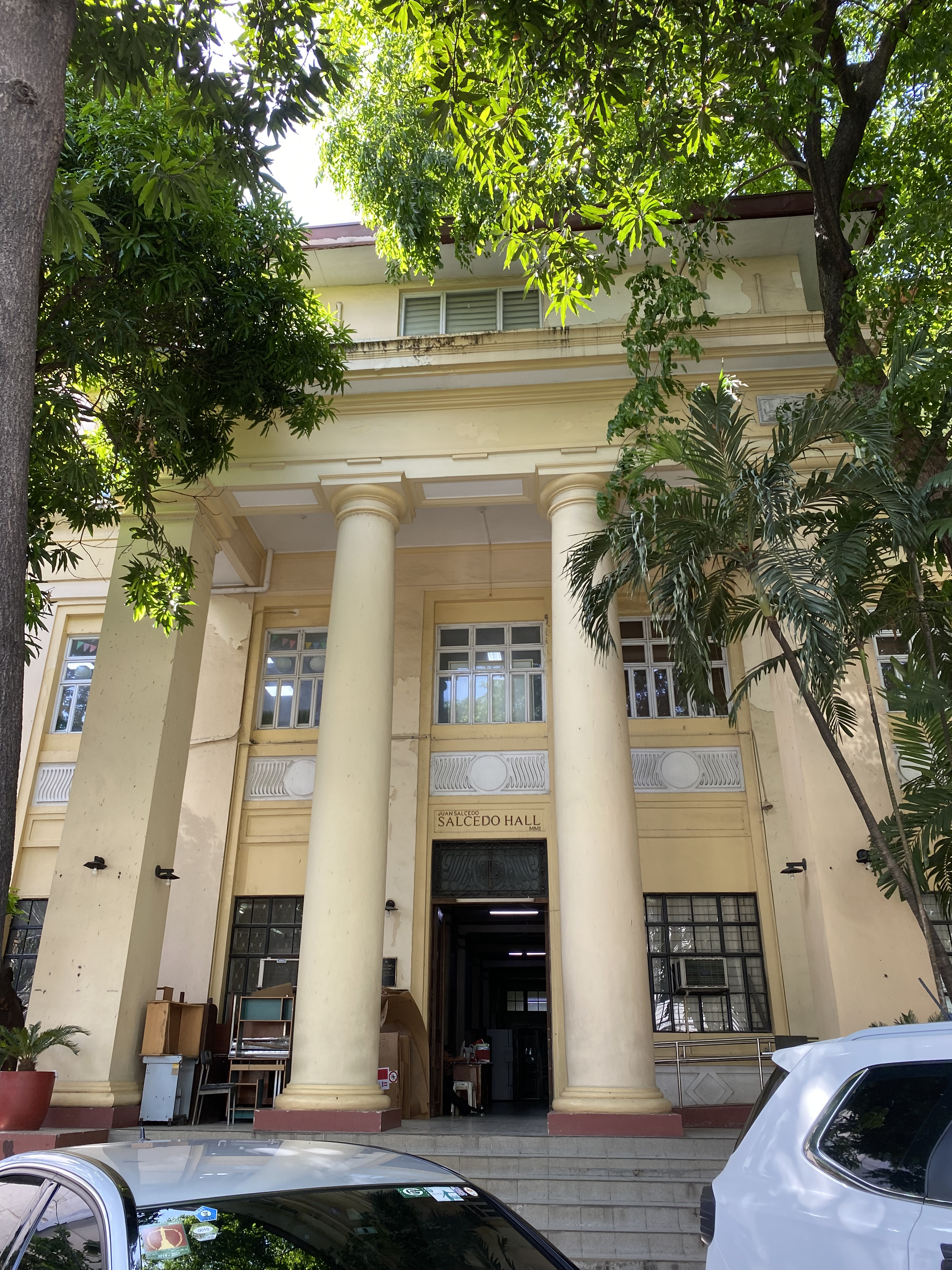
Juan Salcedo Hall

The college draws support from the Philippine General Hospital, the largest public hospital in the Philippines.

The college enjoys allied faculty and resource support from the other resident colleges in the University of the Philippines Manila, such as:

- The U.P. College of Allied Medical Professions (CAMP)
- The U.P. College of Dentistry (CD)
- The U.P. College of Nursing (CN, a Center of Excellence in Nursing Education)
- The U.P. College of Pharmacy (CO)
- The U.P. College of Public Health (CPH)
- The National Training Center for the Health Professions (NTTC-HP)

The college is also affiliated with the National Institutes of Health comprising eight independent units:

- Institute of Biotechnology and Molecular Biology
- Institute of Ophthalmology
- Institute of Human Genetics
- Institute of Clinical Epidemiology
- Health Policy and Development Studies
- Institute of Child Health and Human Development
- Institute of Pharmaceutical Sciences
- Ear Institute

== Notable alumni ==
- Juan Flavier – Former Philippine Senator and Secretary of Department of Health
- Esperanza Cabral – Former Philippine Secretary of Health; former Philippine Secretary of Social Welfare and Development
- Enrique Ona – Former Philippine Secretary of Health; former executive director of the National Kidney and Transplant Institute
- Alfredo R.A. Bengzon – Dean of the Ateneo School of Medicine and Public Health; chief executive officer of The Medical City
- Fe del Mundo – founded and owned the 1st private pediatric hospital in the Philippines
- Severina Luna de Orosa – One of the earliest female physicians in the Philippines.
- Paulo Campos – National Scientist; pioneer of Nuclear Medicine in the Philippines
- Alberto Romualdez – Former Philippine Secretary of Health; Former Director of Research Institute for Tropical Medicine

== See also ==
- Philippine General Hospital
- University of the Philippines Manila
- University of the Philippines
