= Benjamin Cabrera =

Filipino physician

Benjamin David Cabrera (March 18, 1920 – August 7, 2001) was a Filipino physician who was known for his research on medical parasitology and public health.

== Life and career ==
Cabrera was born in Tarlac in March 1920. He earned his degree in medicine at the University of the Philippines in 1945. He then decided to continue his education at Tulane University in New Orleans, Louisiana, United States, where he garnered his master's degree in Public Health, major in Medical Parasitology and Public Health. He graduated in 1950.

Focusing on his major, Cabrera published more than a hundred scientific studies concerning medical parasitology and public health. He also developed innovations in drug treatments against diseases caused by mosquitoes and agricultural soil. In 1961, together with Lee M. Howard, he made the first field study of simian malaria in the Philippines, and found that malaria occurred in 8.6 percent of the animals tested. Although the study was very limited, the report suggested that the simian reservoir of malaria is probably of limited significance for the human population in the Philippines.

For his work on filariasis, Cabrera received the Philippine Legion of Honor, a Presidential Award in 1996. With the elucidation of the epidemiology and life cycles of filarial parasites, preventive measures in the form of drug treatment of human cases as well as measures against the mosquito vectors can be implemented. Cabrera also worked on the control of ascariasis. With the model he proposed, hazards produced by these soil-transmitted helminths can be reduced.

Cabrera died in August 2001 at the age of 81.
