= Asuncion Raymundo =

Filipino biogogist

Asuncion Karganilla-Raymundo
- Born: August 15, 1946 (age 80)
- Education: University of the Philippines Los Baños University of Hawaii University of Illinois
- Scientific career
- Fields: Microbiology

Asuncion Karganilla-Raymundo is a Filipino biologist and Professor Emeritus for Microbiology at the University of the Philippines Los Baños College of Agriculture.

== Biography ==
Raymundo was born on August 15, 1946. She got a bachelor's degree in soil microbiology from the University of the Philippines Los Baños College of Agriculture and got her Master's in phytobacteriology from the University of Hawaii. She then returned to the University of the Philippines Los Baños in 1972, becoming faculty of the new College of Science and Humanities. Raymundo later obtained her Ph.D. from the University of Illinois and became a postdoctoral researcher in molecular genetics at the International Rice Research Institute. She has also worked at Monash, Osaka and Kansas State universities. In 1987 she was awarded an Outstanding Teacher Award and received Presidential Diploma of Merit a year later. She trained over 130 graduate and undergraduate students. During her teachings she and her class studied hypersensitivity and pathogenicity gene of a microorganism called Xanthomonas oryzae, and Ralstonia solanacearum a bacterial wilt which was found on solanaceous crops and bananas. In 2001 she became Pantas Awardee. Currently she is a dean of the College of Arts and Sciences in the University of the Philippines. She is a member of the Philippine Society for Microbiology and is a President in the same field at the American Society.
