= Philippine General Hospital =

Government hospital in Manila, Philippines

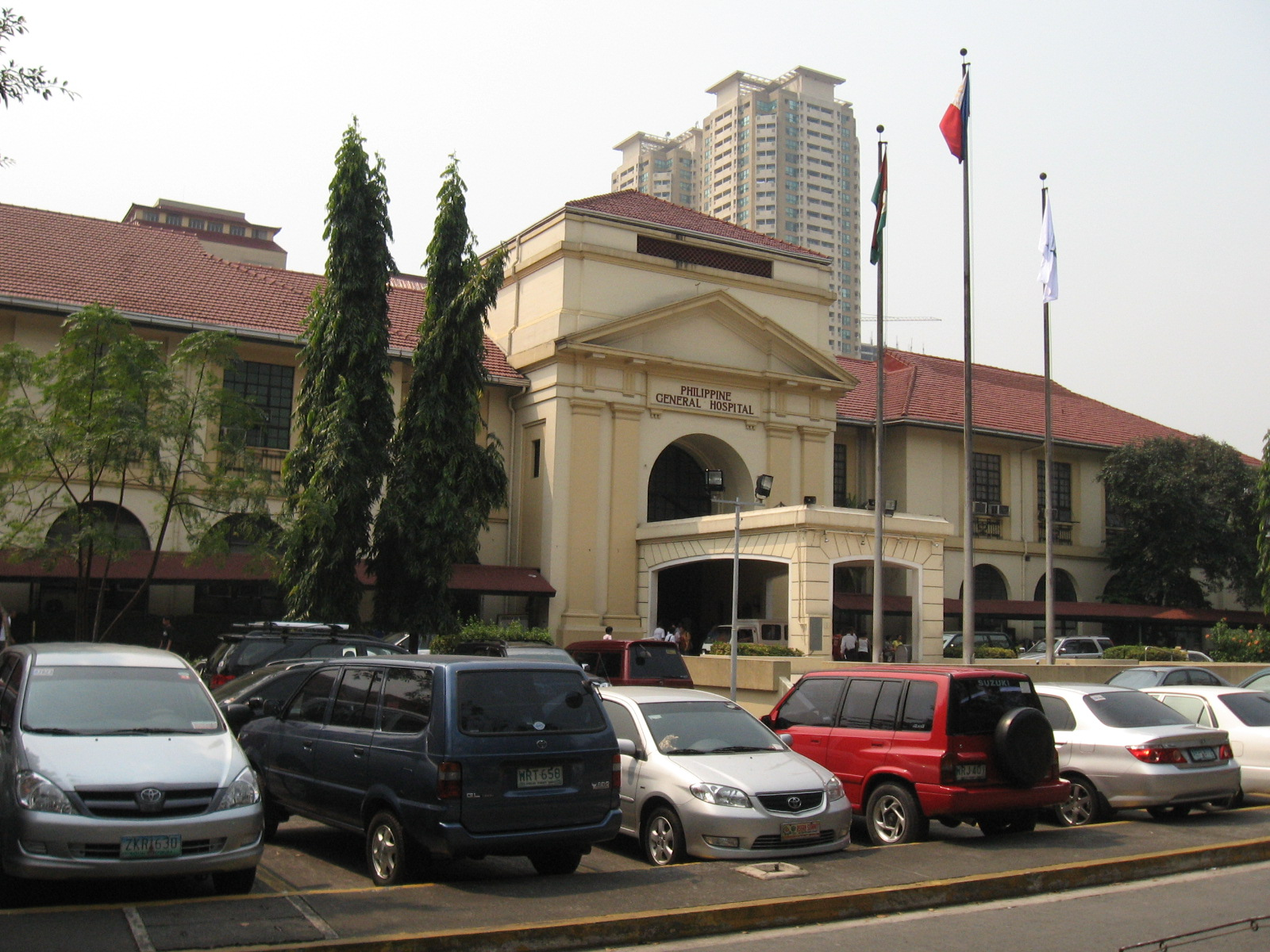
- Hospital entrance

- Location within Metro Manila Location within Luzon Location within Philippines

Geography
- Location: Ermita, Manila, Philippines
- Coordinates: 14°34′41″N 120°59′08″E

Organization
- Care system: Public
- Type: General, public, teaching
- Affiliated university: University of the Philippines Manila

Services
- Emergency department: Yes
- Beds: 1,100 charity beds 400 private beds

History
- Founded: August 17, 1907; 119 years ago (Established); September 1, 1910; 116 years ago (Opened to the public)

Links
- Website: www.pgh.gov.ph
- Lists: Hospitals in the Philippines

The Philippine General Hospital (Note: also known as University of the Philippines–Philippine General Hospital or UP–Philippine General Hospital, simply referred to as UP–PGH or PGH) is a tertiary state-owned hospital administered and operated by the University of the Philippines Manila. It is designated as the National University Hospital, and the national government referral center.

It stands within a 10-hectare (25-acre) site located at the UP Manila Campus in Ermita, Manila. PGH has 1,100 beds and 400 private beds, and has an estimated 4,000 employees to serve more than 600,000 patients every year.

The PGH, being the second largest hospital in the country (next to SPMC), is the laboratory hospital of health science students enrolled in the University of the Philippines. This includes students of medicine, nursing, physical therapy, pharmacy, occupational therapy, dentistry, and speech pathology.

There are 16 clinical departments under the Philippine General Hospital — Family and Community Medicine, Anesthesiology, Internal Medicine, Surgery, Neurosciences, Pediatrics, Otorhinolaryngology-Head & Neck Surgery, Ophthalmology, Orthopedics, Rehabilitation Medicine, Psychiatry, Radiology, Pathology, Emergency Medicine, Obstetrics & Gynecology, and Dermatology—all of which offer residency and fellowship training. It also offers various training for paramedical specialties such as nursing, physical therapy, occupational therapy, speech pathology, radiation technology, nutrition, hospital dentistry, medical technology and EMT training.

== History ==
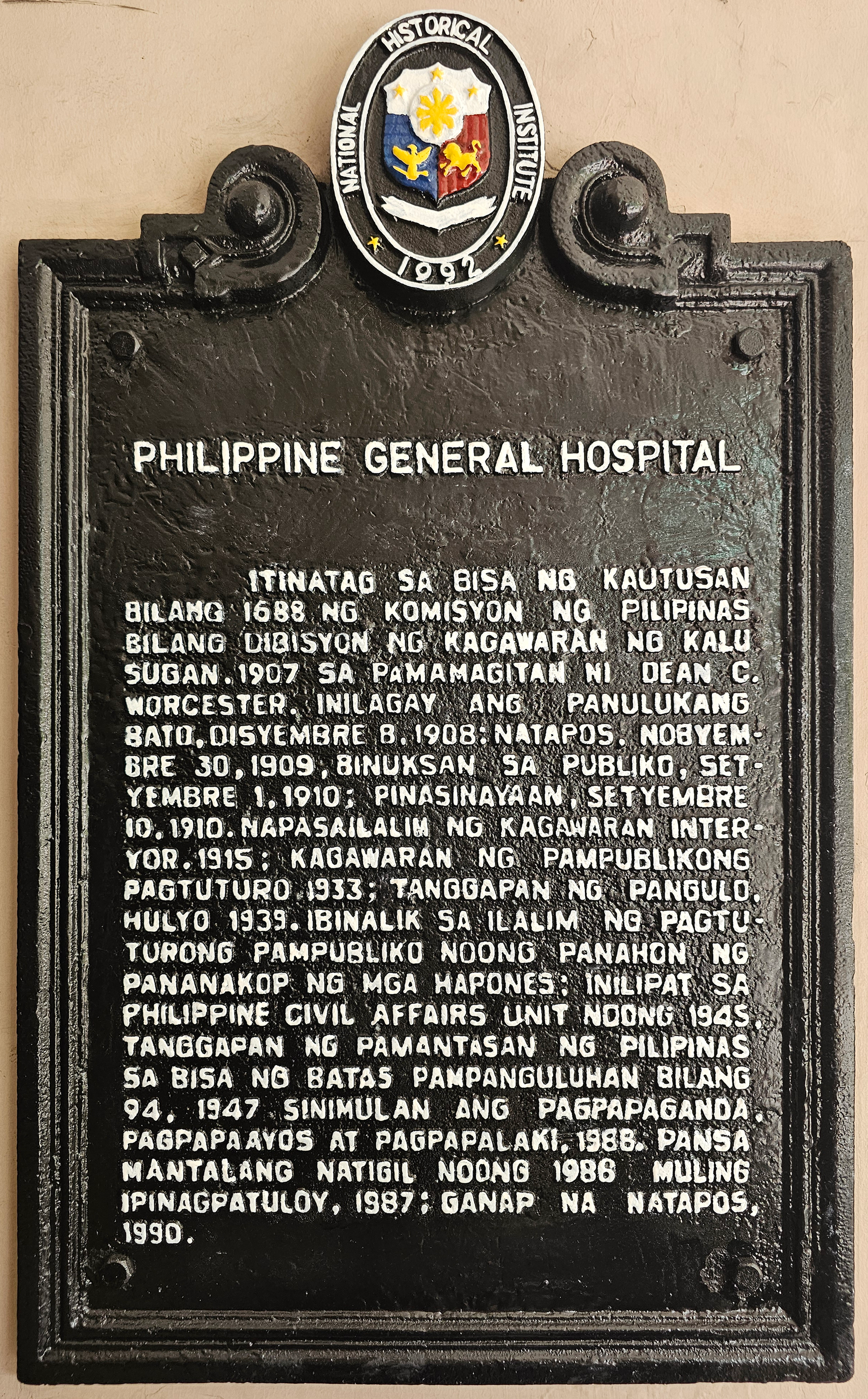
National historical marker installed at the lobby in 1992

In 1907, The Philippine Commission appropriated around ₱780,000.00 for the construction of the Philippine General Hospital in Manila. The building's cornerstone was laid on February 28, 1908 and the construction contract was awarded to H. Thurber of the Manila Construction Company. The structure for the central administration building, a surgical pavilion with two operating rooms, a building for dispensary and out-clinic, five ward pavilions of sixty beds each, a nurses’ home, a kitchen, an ambulance stable and morgue were completed on November 30, 1909.

The Philippine General Hospital opened its door to the public in September 1910 with three hundred thirty beds and was eventually linked to the Philippine Medical School.

PGH remained open during World War II, where its wards overflowed with victims of the conflict. It treated Filipino, Japanese soldiers and American internees alike, even if the hospital supplies are almost depleted.

In 1981, Architect J. Ramos undertook the master planning of the PGH renovation project. PGH celebrated its centennial in 2007, one hundred years since the United States government passed a law establishing it.

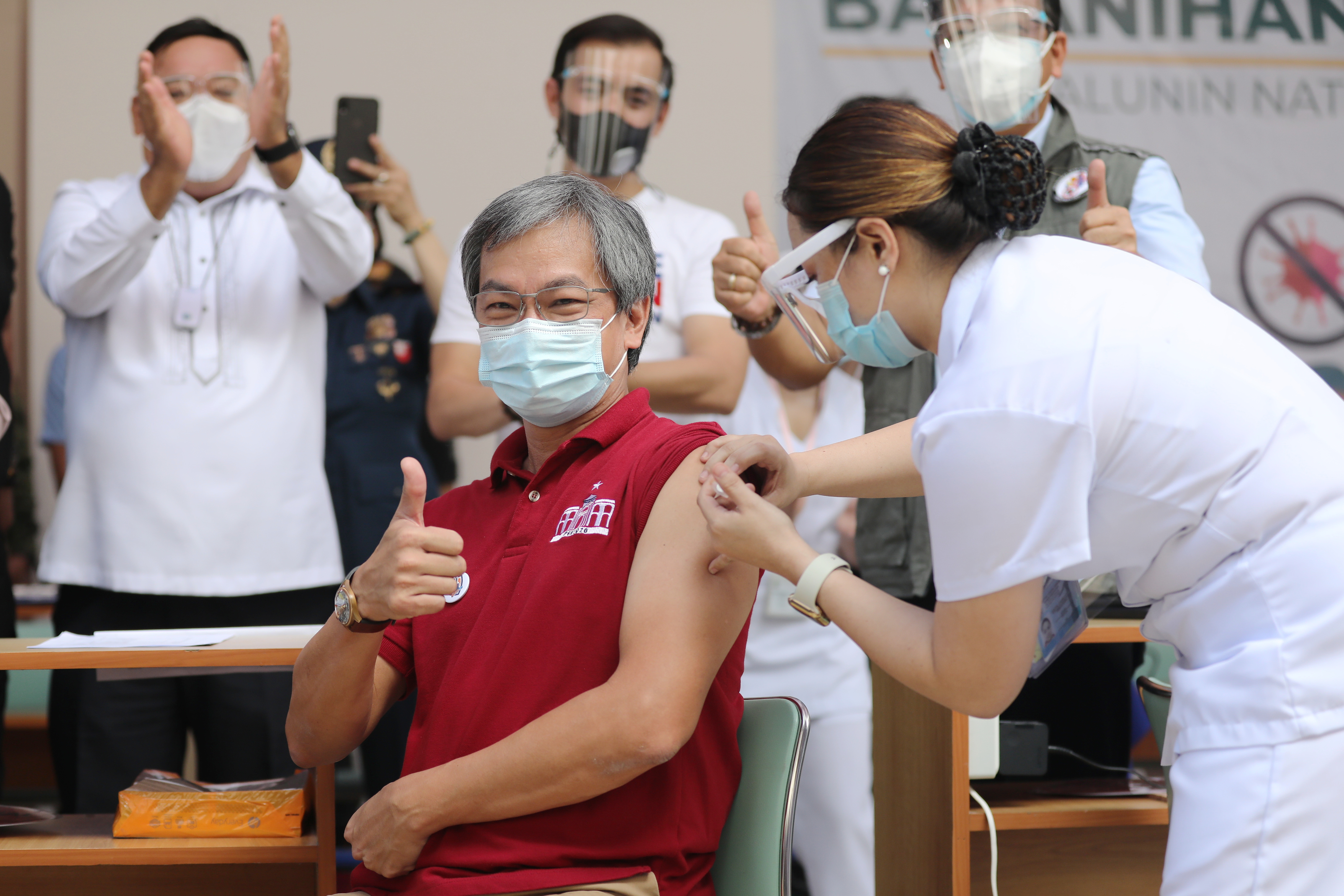
Hospital Director Dr. Gerardo Legaspi gets the first inoculation of the CoronaVac in 2021

During the COVID-19 pandemic in the Philippines, PGH was selected as one of the COVID-19 referral centers in the country. The hospital provided 130 beds for COVID-19 patients, while continuing to serve other people with other ailments. PGH officially accepted COVID-19 referrals from other hospitals starting March 30, 2020.

In the afternoon of March 13, 2024, a fire damaged some of the wards of the hospital. The blaze started in the audio-visual room of the Department of Medicine and damaged Wards 1-4. In the immediate aftermath the hospital raised “Code Triage” in its emergency room, allowing only patients with life-threatening injuries to enter.

In May 2025, President Bongbong Marcos signed a law to increase the hospital's capacity from 1,334 beds to 2,200.

== Architecture ==
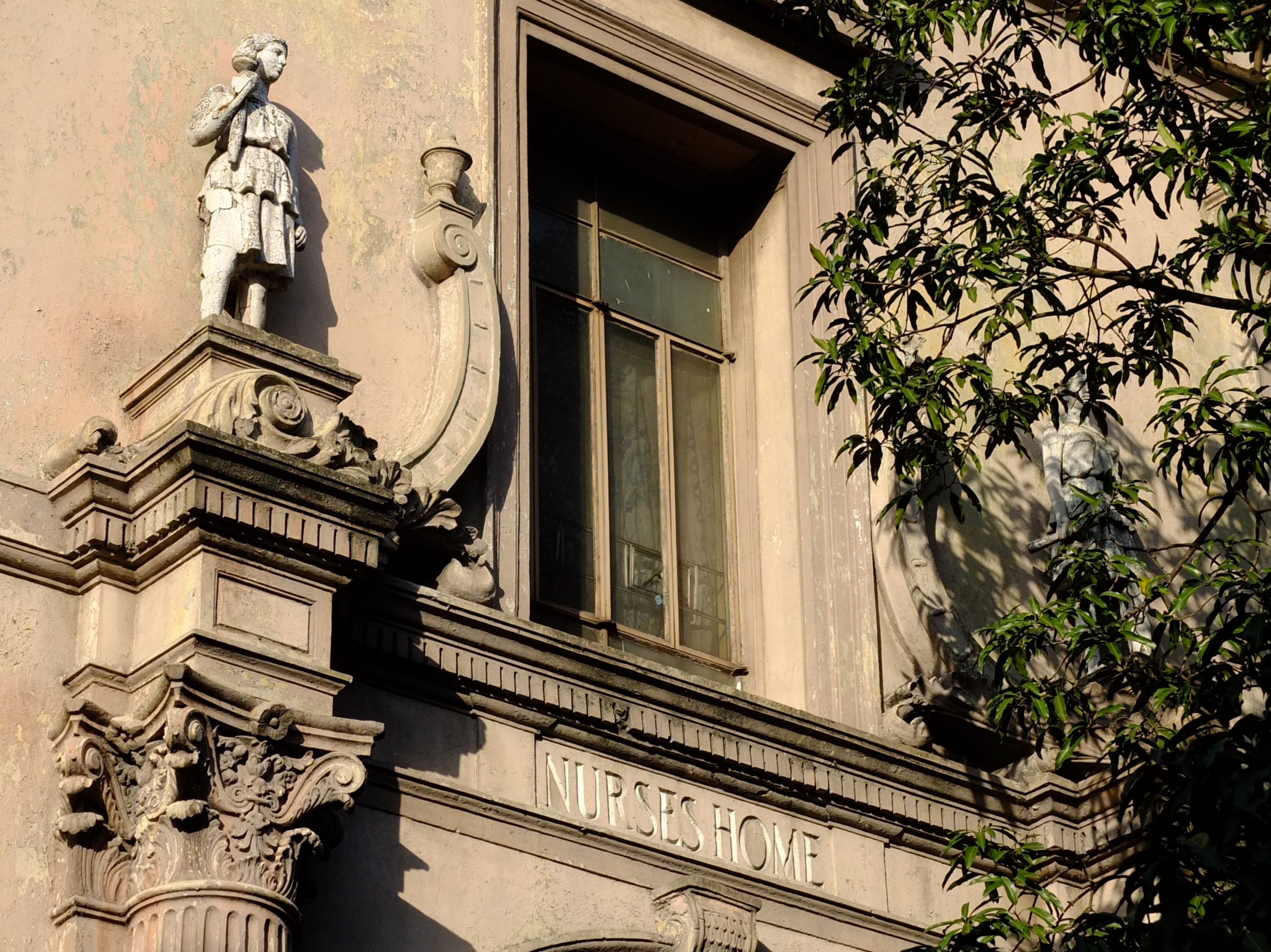
Detail of ornamentation on Nurses' Home

The Philippine General Hospital Administration Building is situated along Taft Avenue in Manila. It was designed by architect Tomas Mapua in a Neoclassical style that follows the Daniel Burnham plan for Manila.

Along with the hospital, this plan included the Manila Hotel and Army and Navy Club, executed by Burnham's successor, William E. Parsons, who was a city planner in the Philippines during the American colonial period of the country. These works were a translation of Neoclassicism into a new hybrid of colonial tropical architecture.

The hospital complex was designed around a central group of buildings for administration, operations, and kitchen pavilions surrounded by wards. The initial site allowed for the construction of a main administration building surrounded by 20 two-story ward buildings with a total capacity of 1,400 beds. The structures were designed with walls made of reinforced concrete beneath a roof of red Ludowici clay tile, using Apitong timber for ceiling joists and Guijo for roofs of connecting corridors.

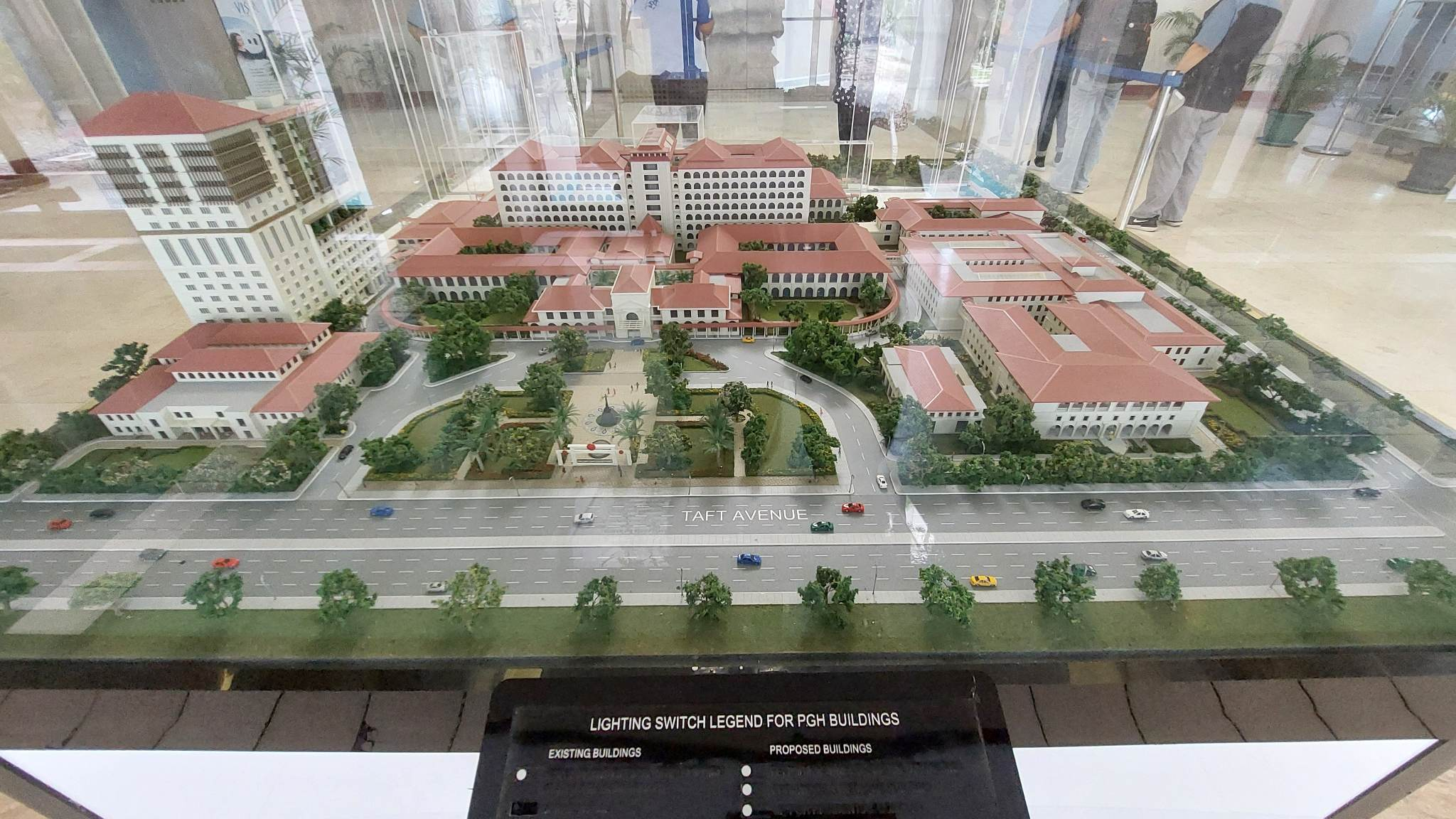
A diorama of the hospital showing planned expansion in 2023

In 2014, a new Pediatric Oncology Isolation Ward was constructed using a donation from Alice Eduardo. A dormitory was also built to house the children's caregivers or relatives while they were admitted to PGH.

In 2020 Bahay Silungan, originally known as the Nurses' Home, underwent an extensive restoration funded by donations from Eduardo and TikTok Philippines. The home was first occupied in 1911 and has 18 bedrooms, terraces, and verandas. After the restoration, Bahay Silungan was able to accommodate up to 66 nurses and 14 transient patients.
