= National Institutes of Health (Philippines) =

Health research center in Manila, Philippines

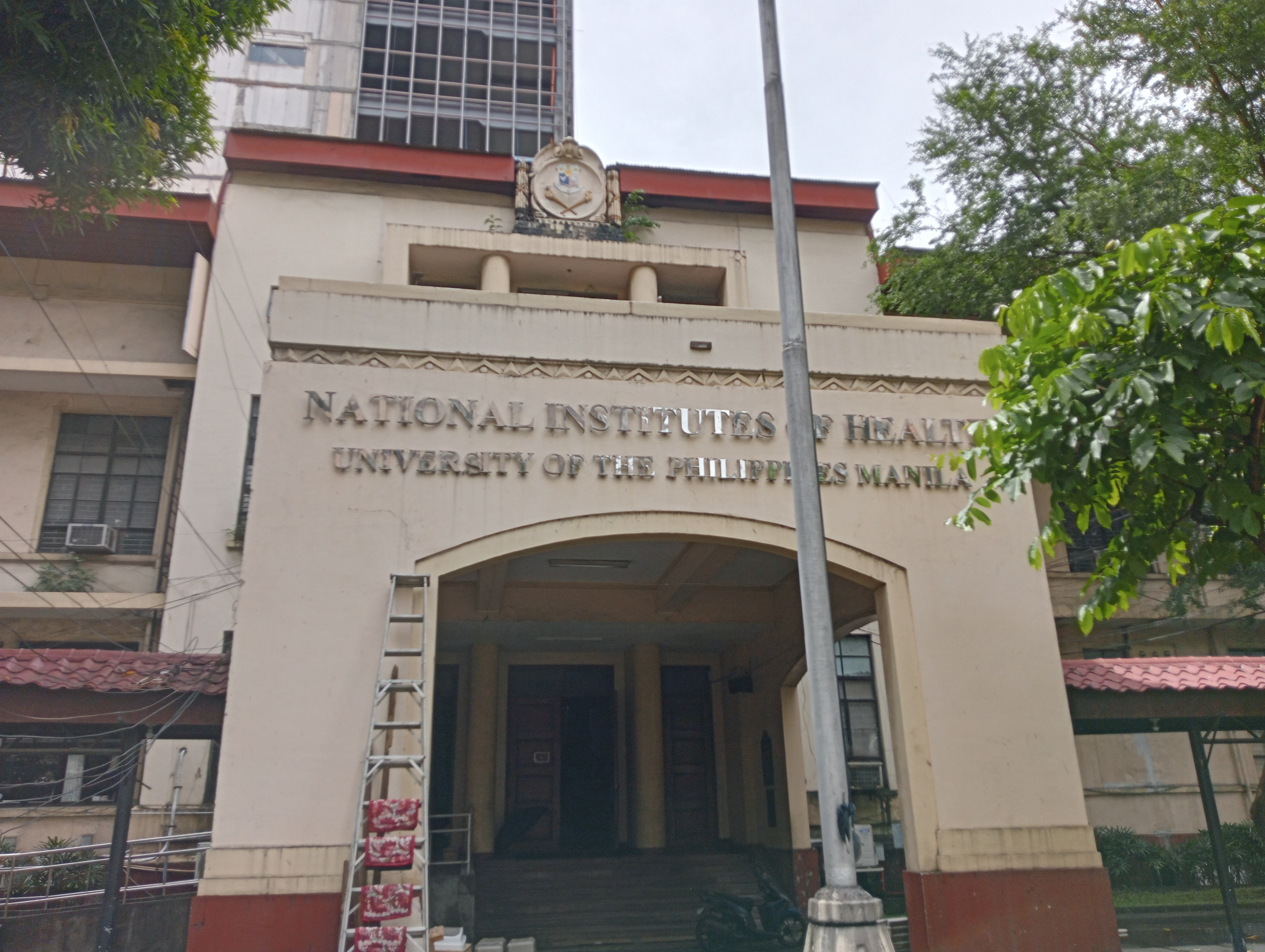

Agency overview
- Formed: January 26, 1996
- Headquarters: 623 Pedro Gil Street, Ermita 1000 Manila, Philippines; 14°34′33″N 120°59′13″E
- Website: nih.upm.edu.ph

The National Institutes of Health (NIH) is the national health research center of the Philippines that is responsible for biomedical and public health research.

== History ==
The National Institutes of Health was created on January 26, 1996 by the University of the Philippines Board of Regents to enhance research undertakings of UP Manila with regard to public health. It serves as an institutional home of a network of researchers and research institutions. Eventually, NIH was established as the national health research center of the Philippines through the Health Research and Development Act of 1998, otherwise known as Republic Act 8503.

In March 2018, NIH celebrated its 20th anniversary by organizing a scientific conference focusing on the importance of work, health and well-being of the Filipino people at the Bayanihan Center, UNILAB, Pasig.
