= Sixto Orosa =

Filipino physician and writer (1891–1981)

- Born: Sixto Ylagan Orosa; August 6, 1891; Taal, Batangas, Captaincy General of the Philippines
- Died: April 21, 1981 (aged 89)
- Occupations: Physician, author
- Relatives: María Orosa (sister)

Sixto Ylagan Orosa Sr. (August 6, 1891 – April 21, 1981) was a Filipino physician and writer.

== Background ==
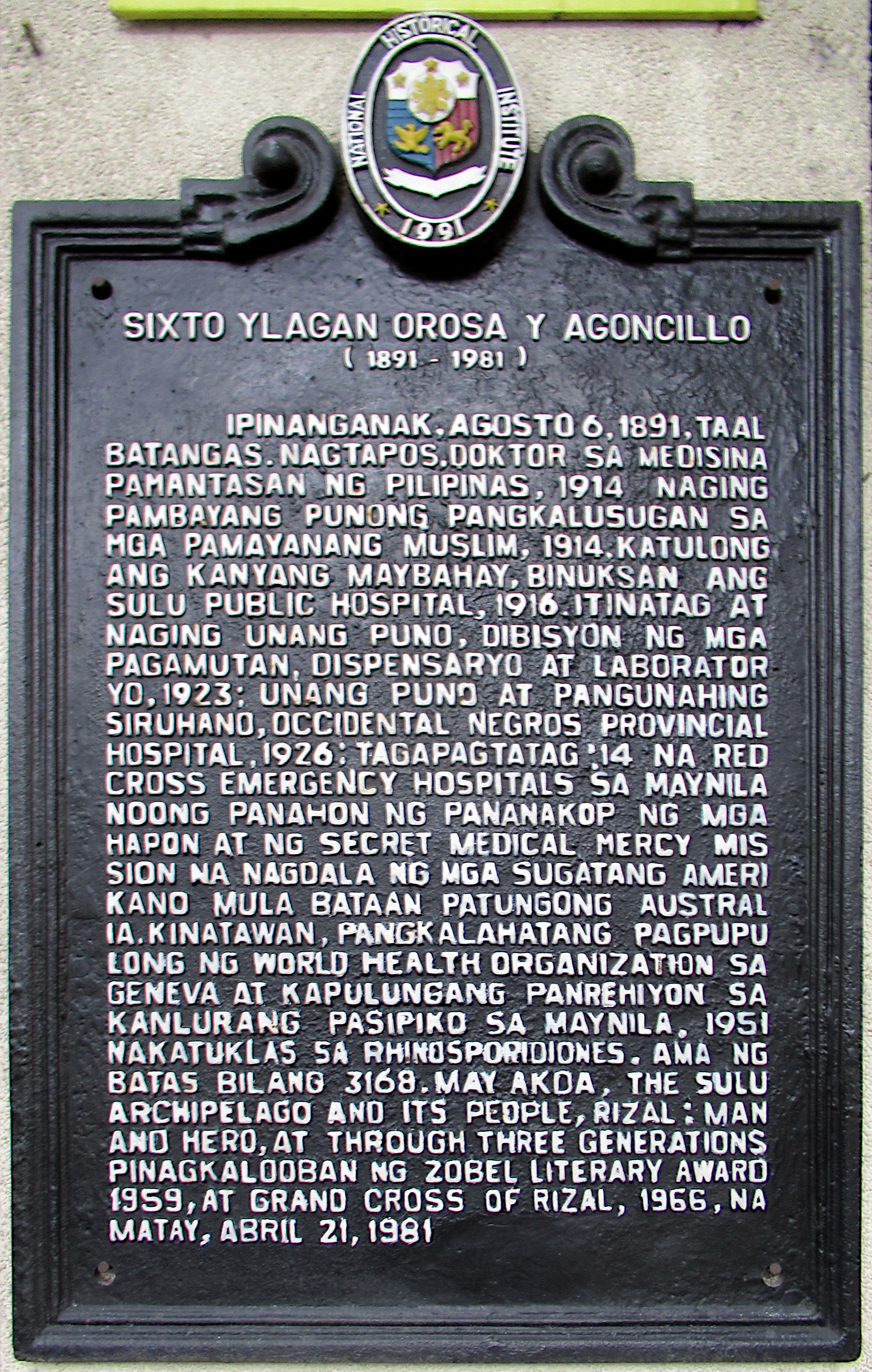
Historical marker installed by the National Historical Institute in 1991 inside the Department of Health main compound in Santa Cruz, Manila

Orosa was born in Taal. He was the brother of María Orosa.

== Books ==
Books written by Orosa, includes:

The Sulu Archipelago and Its People, World Book Company, 1931
Through Three Generations, 1976
Jose Rizal: Man and Hero,
Si Jose Rizal: ang pambansang bayaning Pilipino, S.Y. Orosa, 1958
