= List of University of the Philippines Diliman people =

The following is a list of notable alumni and faculty from the University of the Philippines Diliman.

== Notable students and alumni ==
=== Academia ===
Alumni	Notability	Ref.
Encarnación Alzona	Chairperson of the University of the Philippines Diliman Department of History; chairperson of the National Historical Commission of the Philippines; National Scientist of the Philippines	
Guillermo Capati	Adjunct professor of civil and environmental engineering at University of Queensland	
Paulo Campos	Head of the Department of Medicine of the University of the Philippines; National Scientist of the Philippines	
Edwin Copeland	founder and first dean of U.P. Agricultural College (now U.P. Los Baños)	
Onofre Corpuz	1President of the University of the Philippines	
Randy David	Professor emeritus of sociology at the University of the Philippines Diliman	
Romulo Davide	professor emeritus of the Plant Pathology Department, College of Agriculture, University of the Philippines Los Baños; National Scientist of the Philippines	
Conrado Dayrit	emeritus professor of pharmacology at the University of the Philippines College of Medicine.	
Jennifer Dy	Professor at Northeastern University	
José Encarnación Jr.	Dean at the UP School of Economics	
Mikaela Fudolig	physicist and academic; former child prodigy	
Alfredo Juinio	Dean of the UP College of Engineering; former Minister of Public Works and Highways and Administrator of the National Irrigation Administration	
Mahar Lagmay	executive director of Project NOAH and a professor at the National Institute of Geological Sciences of the University of the Philippines Diliman	
Alejandro Melchor	Dean and secretary of the UP College of Engineering; head of the mathematics department at the Philippine Military Academy.	
Fe del Mundo	head of the Department of Pediatrics at Far Eastern University - Nicanor Reyes Medical Foundation; first woman admitted to Harvard Medical School; National Scientist of the Philippines	
Baldomero Olivera	Distinguished Professor of Biology at the University of Utah	
Alfredo E. Pascual	President of the University of the Philippines; Secretary of Trade and Industry	
Jose Mario De Vega	professor of philosophy, ethics, and anthropology at Nilai University	
Jose R. Velasco	plant physiologist at the University of the Philippines College of Agriculture (now University of the Philippines Los Baños) , National Scientist of the Philippines	
Carmen Velasquez	Parasitologist; professor of zoology at the University of the Philippines Diliman; National Scientist of the Philippines	
Gregorio F. Zaide	historian and academic; Mayor of Pagsanjan, Laguna	

=== Activism ===
Alumni	Notability	Ref.
Leandro Alejandro	student council leader, honored for his role in resisting the authoritarian dictatorship at the Bantayog ng mga Bayani	
Abraham Sarmiento Jr.	martial law activist	
Wenceslao Vinzons	Filipino patriot and leader of the armed resistance against the Japanese invasion in World War II	

=== Art and architecture ===
Alumni	Notability	Ref.
Napoleon Abueva	sculptor, National Artist of the Philippines	
Fernando Amorsolo	visual artist and National Artist of the Philippines	
Santiago Bose	mixed media artist, founding member of the Baguio Arts Guild	
Louie Bretaña	artist, based in New Zealand	
Zean Cabangis	painter	
Benedicto Cabrera	visual artist and National Artist of the Philippines; founding member of the Baguio Arts Guild	
Botong Francisco	artist, National Artist of the Philippines	
Abdulmari Imao	painter, sculptor, National Artist of the Philippines	
Toym Imao	artist, sculpture	
Geraldine Javier	artist	
José Joya	artist, National Artist of the Philippines	
Cesar Legaspi	painter, National Artist of the Philippines	
Vicente Manansala	painter, National Artist of the Philippines	
Juan Nakpil	architect, National Artist of the Philippines	
Ildefonso Santos	architect, National Artist of the Philippines	
Guillermo Tolentino	sculptor, National Artist of the Philippines	

=== Business ===
Alumni	Notability	Ref.
Jorge L. Araneta	Chairman of Araneta Group of Companies	
Delfin Ganapin Jr.	Manager of the Global Environment Facility small grants program	
Gilberto Duavit Jr.	President and COO of GMA Network, Inc.	
Robina Gokongwei	COO of Robinsons Malls	
Felipe L. Gozon	Chairman and CEO of GMA Network, Inc.	
Loida Nicolas Lewis	Chair and CEO of TLC Beatrice	

=== Entertainment ===
Alumni	Notability	Ref.
Dong Abay	musician, former Yano band member	
Marcus Adoro	musician, former member of Eraserheads	
Nilo Alcala	composer, arranger, vocalist	
Ogie Alcasid	singer-songwriter, comedian, actor	
Chinggoy Alonso	veteran film and movie actor	
Hero Angeles	actor, host, film director, artist	
Angel Aquino	film and television actress	
Atom Araullo	broadcast journalist and television presenter	
Kim Atienza	broadcaster, TV host, weatherman (ABS-CBN and GMA Network)	
Daisy Avellana	stage actress and theater director; National Artist of the Philippines for theater	
Julius Babao	broadcast journalist (ABS-CBN and TV5)	
Claudine Barretto	actress	
Christian Bautista	singer, actor, host and model	
Ramon Bautista	TV personality, internet celebrity, radio dj	
Ishmael Bernal	director and filmmaker; National Artist of the Philippines for film	
Christine Bersola	broadcast journalist and TV personality	
Theodore Boborol	TV and film director	
Ely Buendia	musician, former vocalist of Eraserheads	
Lino Brocka	film director and National Artist of the Philippines for film	
Derick Cabrido	film director	
Angelo Castro Jr.	ABS-CBN News anchor	
Ryan Cayabyab	conductor, composer, arranger, pianist, resident judge of Philippine Idol, National Artist of the Philippines for music	
Levi Celerio	composer and lyricist, National Artist of the Philippines for music	
Behn Cervantes	Film director/actor; Founder, UP Repertory Company	
Wency Cornejo	singer/songwriter, TV host	
Prudenciana Cruz	director of the National Library of the Philippines	
Luchi Cruz-Valdes	broadcast journalist (TV5)	
Ebe Dancel	former Sugarfree frontman, musician	
Kara David	broadcast journalist	
Karen Davila	broadcast journalist	
JM de Guzman	actor	
Vincent de Jesus	composer, librettist, musical scorer and musical director	
Felipe Padilla de Leon	composer and conductor; National Artist of the Philippines for music	
Dolly de Leon	Golden Globe and BAFTA-nominated actress	
Nick Deocampo	film director	
Pepe Diokno	director, producer and screenwriter	
Eugene Domingo	TV and film actress, Tokyo International Film Festival Best Actress	
Hannah Espia	film director, Cinemalaya and Urian Best Director	
Gretchen Espina	Pinoy Idol Season 1 winner	
Frankie Evangelista	Former broadcaster of IBC (1975-1984) and ABS-CBN (1984-2004).	
Gerphil Flores	Asia's Got Talent 2015 "Golden Girl," classical singer	
Gretchen Fullido	athlete, model and anchor	
Cathy Garcia-Sampana	film and television director	
Athena Imperial	Miss Philippines-Earth 2011, news reporter (GMA Network)	
Agot Isidro	singer, TV host and actress	
Richard Juan	TV Host, Actor, entrepreneur	
Joel Lamangan	TV and film director	
Cholo Laurel	film director	
Maricel Laxa	TV actress and host	
Cheche Lazaro	broadcast journalist	
Avid Liongoren	film and commercial director, and animator	
Tony Mabesa	actor, director; pioneer of Philippine university theate	
José Maceda	ethnomusicologist and composer; National Artist of the Philippines for music	
Lara Maigue	singer-songwriter	
Raimund Marasigan	musician, former member of Eraserheads	
Rikki Mathay	broadcast journalist	
Mark Meily	film and TV director	
Maningning Miclat	visual artist and poet	
Armi Millare	keyboardist and vocalist of UDD	
Antonio Molina	composer, conductor, National Artist of the Philippines for music	
Solita Monsod	TV host, newspaper columnist, Professor of Economics, former Economic Planning secretary	
Pitoy Moreno	National Artist; Fashion Czar of Asia	
Ambet Nabus	Radio anchor, editor, comedian and actor	
Sitti Navarro	bossa nova artist, TV host	
Grace Nono	music performing artist, ethnomusicologist, author, cultural worker	
Ramon Obusan	dancer; National Artist of the Philippines for dance	
Ces Oreña-Drilon	broadcast journalist and anchor	
Carl Joseph Papa	filmmaker and animator	
Paula Peralejo	TV and film actress	
Eliza Pineda	Actress and Model	
Maki Pulido	broadcast journalist and host	
Ces Quesada	theatre actress, comedian	
Rory Quintos	film and television director	
Antonio Quirino	Father of Philippine Television; founder of the first television station in the Philippines (now ABS-CBN Corporation)	
Lia Andrea Aquino Ramos	Binibining Pilipinas Miss Universe 2006	
Francisca Reyes-Aquino	dancer; National Artist of the Philippines for dance	
Alden Richards	GMA Network Filipino actor and model	
Frances Rivera	U.S.-based Emmy award-winning TV journalist	
Eddie Romero	film director and National Artist of the Philippines for film	
Arius Raposas	founder of Filipino Historian blog; televsion personality; podcaster	
Martin del Rosario	actor	
Lucio San Pedro	composer and National Artist of the Philippines for music	
J. C. Santos	actor	
Ramon Santos	composer; National Artist of the Philippines for music	
Myrtle Sarrosa	singer, actress, cosplayer, Pinoy Big Brother: Teen Edition 4 Big Winner	
Bernadette Sembrano	broadcast journalist, anchor and host	
Jessica Soho	broadcast journalist	
Auraeus Solito	film director	
Shamcey Supsup	Miss Universe 2011 3rd runner-up	
Kidlat Tahimik	National Artist for Film; Father of Philippine Independent Filmmaking	
Jerrold Tarog	film director	
Mel Tiangco	broadcast journalist, anchor and host, GMA Kapuso Foundation chair	
Andrea Veneración	choral conductor; National Artist of the Philippines for music	
JM Yosures	Tawag ng Tanghalan Season 4 Grand Champion	
Buddy Zabala	musician, former member of Eraserheads	

=== Engineering, science, and medicine ===
Alumni	Notability	Ref.
Joey Comiso	Senior Research Scientist Emeritus at Goddard Space Flight Center	
Tomas Dy-Liacco	electrical engineer, Head of design at the Taiwan Power Company; principal systems engineer for Cleveland Electric Illuminating Company; adjunct professor of electrical engineering at Case Western Reserve University	
Virgilio Enriquez	"Father of Filipino psychology", founder of Sikolohiyang Pilipino	
Jose Juliano	Physicist with the National Academy of Science and Technology	
Benito Vergara	Head of the plant physiology department and director for administration of the International Rice Research Institute; National Scientist of the Philippines	

=== Government ===
Alumni	Notability	Ref.
Jolly Bugarin	Director of the National Bureau of Investigation; president of the International Criminal Police Organization (INTERPOL)	
Alfonso Calalan	Governor of the Central Bank of the Philippines	
Cristeta Comerford	first female White House executive chef	
Roman Kintanar	Director of the Weather Bureau (now the Philippine Atmospheric, Geophysical and Astronomical Services Administration)	
Jaime C. Laya	Governor of the Central Bank of the Philippines, Mambabatas Pambansa, Chairman of the Cultural Center of the Philippines	
Felipe Medalla	Governor of the Central Bank of the Philippines, Director-General of the National Economic and Development Authority	
Solita Monsod	Director General of the National Economic Development Authority	
Raymundo Punongbayan	Director of the Philippine Institute of Volcanology and Seismology	

=== Law ===
Alumni	Notability	Ref.
Carmelino G. Alvendia	Associate Justice, Court of Appeals; founder of Quezon City Academy	
Alicia Austria-Martinez	Associate Justice of the Supreme Court of the Philippines	
Antonio Carpio	Associate Justice of the Supreme Court of the Philippines; Chief Presidential Legal Counsel	
Conchita Carpio-Morales	Associate Justice of the Supreme Court of the Philippines; Ombudsman of the Philippines	
Minita Chico-Nazario	Associate Justice of the Supreme Court of the Philippines; Presiding Justice of the Sandiganbayan	
Hilario Davide Jr.	Chief Justice of the Philippines; Permanent Representative of the Philippines to the United Nations; Chairman of the Commission on Elections; Member of the Philippine Constitutional Commission; Mambabatas Pambansa (Assemblyman)	
Teresita de Castro	Chief Justice of the Philippines, Presiding Justice of the Sandiganbayan	
Marcelo Fernan	Chief Justice of the Philippines; President of the Senate of the Philippines; Regular Batasang Pambansa	
Enrique Fernando	Chief Justice of the Philippines	
Estanislao Fernandez	Associate Justice of the Supreme Court of the Philippines; Senate of the Philippines; Philippine House of Representatives; Regional Mambabatas Pambansa	
Cancio Garcia	Associate Justice of the Supreme Court of the Philippines	
Carolina Griño-Aquino	Associate Justice of the Supreme Court of the Philippines; presiding justice of the Court of Appeals of the Philippines	
Francis Jardeleza	Solicitor General; Associate Justice of the Supreme Court of the Philippines	
Katrina Legarda	lawyer; founding chair of the Child Justice League	
Marvic Leonen	Associate Justice of the Supreme Court of the Philippines; dean of the University of the Philippines College of Law	
Querube Makalintal	Chief Justice of the Philippines ; Solicitor General of the Philippines; Speaker of the Interim Batasang Pambansa	
Reynato Puno	Chief Justice of the Philippines	
Leonardo Quisumbing	Associate Justice of the Supreme Court of the Philippines; Secretary of Labor and Employment	
Flerida Ruth Pineda-Romero	Associate Justice of the Supreme Court of the Philippines	
Abraham Sarmiento	Associate Justice of the Supreme Court of the Philippines	
Maria Lourdes Sereno	Chief Justice of the Philippines	
Presbitero Velasco Jr.	Associate Justice of the Supreme Court of the Philippines; Governor of Marinduque; associate justice of the Philippine Court of Appeals	
Consuelo Ynares-Santiago	Associate Justice of the Supreme Court of the Philippines	

=== Literature ===
Alumni	Notability	Ref.
Francisco Arcellana	writer, poet, and essayist; National Artist of the Philippines for literature	
Virgilio S. Almario	author and poet, chairman of the Komisyon sa Wikang Filipino, National Artist of the Philippines for literature	
Gilbert Luis R. Centina III	poet and Augustinian friar	
Renato Constantino	author and historian; executive secretary of the Philippine Mission to the United Nations; counsellor of the Department of Foreign Affairs	
Timothy James Dimacali	science fiction author and science journalist	
N. V. M. Gonzalez	novelist and writer; National Artist of the Philippines for literature	
Wilfrido Ma. Guerrero	playwright, National Artist of the Philippines for theater	
Amado V. Hernandez	Novelist and poet; president of the Philippine Newspaper Guild; labor leader and communist; Manila Municipal Board; National Artist of the Philippines for literature	
Annette Hug	writer	
F. Sionil José	writer of novels and short stories; National Artist of the Philippines for literature	
Bienvenido Lumbera	poet, critic and dramatist; National Artist of the Philippines for literature	
Severino Montano	playwright, director, actor and theater organizer; National Artist of the Philippines for theater	
Ninotchka Rosca	novelist, feminist, and human rights activist	
Pura Santillan-Castrence	writer, essayist, and diplomat	
Edith Tiempo	poet and fiction writer; National Artist of the Philippines for literature	
Rolando Tinio	poet, dramatist, director, actor; National Artist of the Philippines for theater	
Jeeca Uy	cookbook author and blogger	
José García Villa	poet, literary critic, and short story writer; National Artist of the Philippines for literature	
Jessica Zafra	writer, columnist for The Philippine Star	

=== Military ===
Alumni	Notability	Ref.
Gregorio Catapang Jr.	Chief of Staff of the Armed Forces of the Philippines	

=== Politics ===
Alumni	Notability	Ref.
Roque Ablan Jr.	House of Representatives of the Philippines	
Delia Albert	Secretary of Foreign Affairs	
Domocao Alonto	Senate of the Philippines, House of Representatives of the Philippines	
Bella Angara	Majority Floor Leader of the House of Representatives of the Philippines, Governor of Aurora	
Edgardo Angara	President of the Senate of the Philippines, Executive Secretary, Secretary of Agriculture, President of the University of the Philippines	
Sonny Angara	Secretary of Education, Senate of the Philippines	
Ninoy Aquino	Governor of Tarlac, Senate of the Philippines	
Joker Arroyo	Senate of the Philippines, House of Representatives of the Philippines, Executive Secretary of the Philippines	
Lauro Baja	Philippines Ambassador to the United Nations	
Robert Barbers	Senate of the Philippines, Secretary of the Interior and Local Government, House of Representatives of the Philippines	
Herbert Bautista	Mayor of Quezon City, actor	
Roberto Benedicto	Ambassador of the Philippines to Japan	
Jejomar Binay	Vice President of the Philippines, Mayor of Makati	
Jejomar Binay Jr.	Mayor of Makati	
Nancy Binay	Mayor of Makati, Senate of the Philippines	
Dante Canlas	Director-General of the National Economic and Development Authority	
Alan Peter Cayetano	President of the Senate of the Philippines, Speaker of the House of Representatives of the Philippines, Secretary of Foreign Affairs, Taguig Municipal Council	
Pia Cayetano	Senate of the Philippines, House of Representatives of the Philippines	
Rene Cayetano	Senate of the Philippines, Batasang Pambansa, Deputy Minister for Trade and Industry Administrator of the Export Processing Zone Authority (now Philippine Export Zone Authority)	
Edgar Chatto	House of Representatives of the Philippines, Governor of Bohol	
Nikki Coseteng	Senate of the Philippines, House of Representatives of the Philippines	
Simeon Datumanong	House of Representatives of the Philippines, Secretary of Justice, Secretary of Public Works and Highways, Governor of Maguindanao, Governor of Cotabato	
Arthur Defensor Sr.	Governor of Iloilo, House of Representatives of the Philippines	
Mike Defensor	House of Representatives of the Philippines, Malacañang Chief of Staff, Secretary of Environment and Natural Resources, 1st Chairman of the Housing and Urban Development Coordinating Council	
Franklin Drilon	President of the Senate of the Philippines, Executive Secretary of the Philippines, Secretary of Justice, Secretary of Labor and Employment, President of the Liberal Party	
E. R. Ejercito	Governor of Laguna; mayor of Pagsanjan, Laguna; actor	
Juan Ponce Enrile	President of the Senate of the Philippines, Chief Presidential Legal Counsel, House of Representatives of the Philippines, Regular Batasang Pambansa, Minister of National Defense, Secretary of Justice	
Francis Escudero	President of the Senate of the Philippines, House of Representatives of the Philippines, Governor of Sorsogon	
Erlinda Fadera-Basilio	Philippines Ambassador to China, Permanent Representative of Philippines to the United Nations; Acting Secretary of Foreign Affairs; head of the Foreign Service Institute	
Arnulf Bryan Fuentebella	House of Representatives of the Philippines	
Felix William Fuentebella	House of Representatives of the Philippines, Undersecretary of the Department of Energy	
Gwendolyn Garcia	Governor of Cebu, House of Representatives of the Philippines	
Pablo John Garcia	House of Representatives of the Philippines	
Magi Gunigundo	House of Representatives of the Philippines	
Dick Gordon	Senate of the Philippines, Secretary of Tourism	
Yeng Guiao	House of Representatives of the Philippines, Vice Governor of Pampanga; interim head coach of the Philippines men's national basketball team; head coach of the Rain or Shine Elasto Painters	
Judith Guthertz	Senator of Guam, Member of the Guam Board of Education	
Constantino Jaraula	Mayor of Cagayan de Oro, House of Representatives of the Philippines	
Edcel Lagman	President of the Liberal Party, House of Representatives of the Philippines	
Jose Laurel Jr.	Speaker of the House of Representatives of the Philippines, Regular Batasang Pambansa, National Assembly	
Salvador Laurel	Vice President of the Philippines, Prime Minister of the Philippines, Secretary of Foreign Affairs, Interim Batasang Pambansa, President of the Nacionalista Party	
Sotero Laurel	Senate of the Philippines	
Loren Legarda	Senate of the Philippines, House of Representatives of the Philippines	
Juan Liwag	Senate of the Philippines, Secretary of Justice, Solicitor General of the Philippines, Interim Batasang Pambansa	
Cardozo Luna	Undersecretary of National Defense, Philippine Ambassador to The Netherlands, Vice Chief of Staff of the Armed Forces of The Philippines	
Gloria Macapagal Arroyo	President of the Philippines, Vice President of the Philippines, Speaker of the House of Representatives of the Philippines, Secretary of National Defense, Secretary of Social Welfare and Development, Senate of the Philippines	
Catalino Macaraig Jr.	Executive Secretary of the Philippines, Minister of Justice	
Ferdinand Marcos	President of the Philippines, Prime Minister of the Philippines, Governor of Metro Manila, Secretary of National Defense	
Liza Maza	House of Representatives of the Philippines	
Heidi Mendoza	Under-Secretary-General for the United Nations Office of Internal Oversight Services; Officer in Charge of the Commission on Audit	
Nur Misuari	Founder and leader of the Moro National Liberation Front; Governor of the Autonomous Region in Muslim Mindanao	
Mario Montejo	Secretary of Science and Technology; professor at the College of Engineering of the University of the Philippines Diliman	
Christian Monsod	Chairperson of the Commission on Elections, Member of the Philippine Constitutional Commission	
Oscar Orbo	Governor of Pangasinan, House of Representatives of the Philippines, Executive Secretary of the Philippines, Secretary of Transportation and Communications	
Raymond Palatino	House of Representatives of the Philippines	
Kiko Pangilinan	Senate of the Philippines, Presidential Assistant for Food Security and Agricultural Modernization, Quezon City Council	
Rey Pagtakhan	Parliament of Canada, Parliamentary Secretary to the Prime Minister, Secretary of State (Asia-Pacific), Minister of Veterans Affairs, Secretary of State (Science, Research and Development), Minister of Western Economic Diversification	
Fortunato de la Peña	Secretary of Science and Technology	
Ernesto Pernia	Director-General of the National Economic and Development Authority	
Koko Pimentel	President of the Senate of the Philippines, National Youth Commission for Mindanao	
Gil Puyat	President of the Senate of the Philippines, president of the Nacionalista Party	
Miro Quimbo	House of Representatives of the Philippines	
Ralph Recto	Executive Secretary of the Philippines, Secretary of Finance, House of Representatives of the Philippines, Senate of the Philippines, Director-General of the National Economic and Development Authority	
Gilbert Remulla	House of Representatives of the Philippines	
Jesus Crispin Remull	House of Representatives of the Philippines, Ombudsman of the Philippines, Secretary of Justice, Governor of Cavite	
Jonvic Remulla	Governor of Cavite, Secretary of the Interior and Local Government	
Jesse Robredo	Secretary of the Interior and Local Government; Mayor of Naga, Camarines Sur	
Leni Robredo	Vice President of the Philippines, House of Representatives of the Philippines, Mayor of Naga	
Rufus Rodriguez	House of Representatives of the Philippines, Vice Governor of Misamis Oriental, Commissioner of the Bureau of Immigration	
Martin Romualdez	Speaker of the House of Representatives of the Philippines	
José E. Romero	Secretary of Education; Ambassador Extraordinary and Plenipotentiary of the Philippines to the United Kingdom; Senate of the Philippines; House of Representatives of the Philippines	
Carlos P. Romulo	President of the United Nations General Assembly; Secretary of Foreign Affairs; Secretary of Instruction and Information; Ambassador of the Philippines to the United States, Resident Commissioner of the Philippines; Interim Batasang Pambansa; President of the University of the Philippines; publisher and editor of The Philippines Herald; novelist; National Artist of the Philippines for literature	
Roman Romulo	House of Representatives of the Philippines	
Gerardo Roxas Jr.	House of Representatives of the Philippines	
Gerry Roxas	Senate of the Philippines, House of Representatives of the Philippines, President of the Liberal Party	
Rafael M. Salas	Executive Secretary of the Philippines	
Juan Salcedo Jr.	Secretary of Health; dean of the University of the East Medical College and president of Araneta University; National Scientist of the Philippines	
Miriam Defensor Santiago	Senate of the Philippines, Judge of the International Criminal Court, Secretary of Agrarian Reform	
Jose Maria Sison	founder of the Communist Party of the Philippines, professor of literature and social sciences; poet	
Victor Sumulong	House of Representatives of the Philippines, Mayor of Antipolo, Undersecretary for the Department of the Interior and Local Government	
Mamintal A. J. Tamano	Senate of the Philippines, Vice Governor of Lanao del Sur	
Maria Gracia Pulido Tan	Chair of the Philippine Commission on Audit, Undersecretary of the Revenue Operations Group in the Department of Finance, Presidential Commission on Good Government	
Arturo Tolentino	President of the Senate of the Philippines, Minister of Foreign Affairs, Senate of the Philippines, House of Representatives of the Philippines, Interim Batasang Pambansa	
Ruben Torres	Secretary of Labor and Employment, Executive Secretary of the Philippines, House of Representatives of the Philippines	
Antonio Trillanes	Senate of the Philippines; Oakwood mutiny and Manila Peninsula mutiny leader	
Niel Tupas Jr.	House of Representatives of the Philippines, Iloilo Provincial Board	
Niel Tupas Sr.	Governor of Iloilo; House of Representatives of the Philippines; Interim Batasang Pambansa; Municipal Mayor of Barotac Viejo, Iloilo	
Luis Villafuerte	Governor of Camarines Sur, House of Representatives of the Philippines	
Manny Villar	President of the Senate of the Philippines, Speaker of the House of Representatives of the Philippines, President of the Nacionalista Party	
Wenceslao Vinzons	Governor of Camarines Norte, member of the 1934 Philippine Constitutional Convention, House of Representatives of the Philippines	
Liwayway Vinzons-Chato	House of Representatives of the Philippines; Commissioner of the Bureau of Internal Revenue	
Cesar Virata	Prime Minister of the Philippines, Deputy Prime Minister of the Philippines, Director-General of the National Economic and Development Authority and Minister of Economic Planning, Secretary/Minister of Finance, Interim Batasang Pambansa	
Perfecto Yasay Jr.	Secretary of Foreign Affairs, Chairman of Securities and Exchange Commission	
Nicanor Yñiguez	House of Representatives of the Philippines; Speaker of the Regular Batasang Pambansa	
Haydee Yorac	Chair of the Commission on Elections; Chairperson of the Presidential Commissioner on Good Government; assistant vice president for academic affairs at the University of the Philippines Diliman; senior researcher at the University of the Philippines Law Center	

=== Sports ===
Alumni	Notability	Ref.
Eric Altamirano	professional basketball player and head coach of the UP Fighting Maroons women's basketball team	
Mariano Araneta	sports executive and retired footballer; former president of the Philippine Football Federation	
Jun Bernardino	commissioner of the National Collegiate Athletic Association (Philippines) and Philippine Basketball Association	
JD Cagulangan	professional basketball player for the Suwon KT Sonicboom	
Dionisio Calvo	coach who mentored both the basketball and football national teams of the Philippines.	
Marvin Cruz	professional basketball player of the Burger King Whoppers	
Diego Dario	professional basketball player for the Quezon Huskers	
Paul Desiderio	professional basketball player for the Abra Solid North Weavers	
Ryan Gregorio	former head coach of the Meralco Bolts basketball team	
Jireh Ibañes	professional basketball player with Rain or Shine Elasto Painters	
Javi Gómez de Liaño	professional basketball player for Anyang Jung Kwan Jang Red Boosters	
Juan Gómez de Liaño	professional basketball player for Seoul SK Knights	
Joe Lipa	commissioner of the University Athletic Association of the Philippines and National Collegiate Athletic Association (Philippines); former UP Fighting Maroons basketball team coach	
Ronnie Magsanoc	assistant coach of the Purefoods Tender Juicy Giants professional basketball team	
Paolo Mendoza	professional basketball player with the Sta. Lucia Realtors	
Benjie Paras	professional basketball player, actor, and comedian	
Bo Perasol	head coach of the Air21 Express basketball team; UP Fighting Maroons basketball program director	
Mikee Reyes	professional basketball player; media personality and sports analyst for One Sports	
Chito Salud	President, CEO, and commissioner of the Philippine Basketball Association	
Magi Sison	professional basketball player for the Mindoro Tamaraws	

== Notable faculty ==
Following are some of the university's current and former notable faculty.

- Gémino Abad
- Vicente Abad Santos - former Supreme Court justice
- Nicanor Abelardo - musician, composer of "U.P. Naming Mahal" ("U.P. Beloved"), the University of the Philippines hymn
- José Abueva - former University of the Philippines president
- Napoleon Abueva - sculptor and National Artist
- Teodoro Agoncillo - professor and chair of the chaired the UP Department of History; National Scientist of the Philippines
- Mila Aguilar
- Virgilio S. Almario - National Artist; former director of the U.P. Institute of Creative Writing; current UP College of Arts and Letters dean
- Julian Banzon - biochemist; National Scientist of the Philippines
- Walden Bello - sociologist
- Henry Otley Beyer - co-founder, UP Department of Anthropology
- Emilia Boncodin - former Budget and Management secretary; Hyatt 10 member
- Lourdes Castrillo Brillantes
- José Wendell Capili
- Clarita Carlos - political analyst; president of Center for Asia Pacific Studies, Inc.; pioneer of political psychology in the country
- Ryan Cayabyab - musician, artistic director of the San Miguel Foundation for the Performing Arts
- Onofre Corpuz – National Scientist of the Philippines; 13th President, University of the Philippines
- Irene Cortes - lawyer and former Supreme Court of the Philippines justice
- Adrian Cristobal - writer, columnist
- Conchitina Cruz
- Isagani R. Cruz - literary critic and playwright
- Jose Dalisay Jr.
- Romulo Davide - National Academy of Science and Technology, Nematology/Plant Pathology
- José Encarnación Jr. – National Scientist of the Philippines, Economics; Dean, UP School of Economics
- J. Neil Garcia
- Malou de Guzman - film and TV actress, former senior lecturer at the UP Film Institute
- Juan R. Francisco - indologist and professor
- N. V. M. Gonzalez - fictionist and National Artist
- Annette Gozon-Valdes - lawyer and Senior Vice-President of GMA Network
- Margarita Holmes - renowned psychologist and sex expert, TV personality
- Jose Juliano - National Academy of Science and Technology, Nuclear Chemistry and Physics
- Luis Katigbak
- Jun Lana - playwright, screenwriter and director
- Domingo Landicho
- Cheche Lazaro - broadcast journalist; founding president of Probe Productions, Inc.
- Alfredo Lagmay - Professor Emeritus of Psychology; National Scientist of the Philippines
- Salvador P. Lopez - writer, journalist, diplomat, former University of the Philippines president
- Bienvenido Lumbera
- Alexander Magno - political scientist, TV host, newspaper columnist
- Rogemar Mamon - mathematician, quantitative analyst, British and Canadian academic
- Paolo Manalo
- Paz Márquez-Benítez - fictionist
- Felipe B. Miranda - founder of Pulse Asia; Professor Emeritus at University of the Philippines Diliman Department of Political Science
- Solita Monsod - professor of economics, former Economic Planning secretary, newspaper columnist, broadcast journalist
- Ambeth R. Ocampo - historian, writer, Chairman National Historical Institute, TOYM History, decorated by Spain and France
- Cristina Padolina - professor of chemistry; current President of Centro Escolar University
- Cristina Pantoja-Hidalgo
- Raymundo Punongbayan - geologist, former Philippine Institute of Volcanology and Seismology (PHIVOLCS) director
- Eduardo Quisumbing - botanist; National Scientist of the Philippines
- Henry J. Ramos - first Filipino plasma physicist, inventor
- Maria Ressa - journalist and Rappler CEO; included in the Time's Person of the Year 2018 and first Filipina Nobel Peace Prize laureate
- Nicanor Reyes Sr. - economist, one of the founders of Far Eastern University
- Temario Rivera - political scientist
- Carlos P. Romulo - Pulitzer Prize winner, president of the United Nations General Assembly 1949–1950, former chairman of the United Nations Security Council and University of the Philippines president
- Caesar Saloma - applied physicist, Dean of College of Science, recipient of 2004 International Commission for Optics' Galileo Award, 2008 ASEAN Outstanding Scientist and Technologist Award
- E. San Juan Jr. - poet and cultural critic
- Bienvenido Santos - poet and fictionist
- Rogelio R. Sikat - writer
- Ligaya Tiamson-Rubin
- Nicanor Tiongson
- Ricardo de Ungria
- Jose Velasco - plant physiologist and agricultural chemist; National Scientist of the Philippines
- Carmen Velasquez - parasitologist; National Scientist of the Philippines
- Rene Villanueva
- Cesar Virata - former Philippines prime minister and Finance secretary; former dean and professor at the UP College of Business Administration
- Haydee Yorac - professor of law; former Philippine Commission of Elections; chairperson of the Presidential Commission on Good Government (PCGG) commissioner
- Prescillano Zamora - professor of biology
