= Maharlika Wealth Fund =

Sovereign wealth fund for the Philippines

Maharlika Investment Corporation
- Type: State-owned
- Industry: Fund management (sovereign wealth fund)
- Founded: July 18, 2023
- Founder: 19th Congress under the administration of President Bongbong Marcos
- Headquarters: ORÉ Central Building, Bonifacio Global City, Taguig, Philippines
- Key people: Secretary of Finance; Rafael Consing Jr. (President and CEO)
- Revenue: 2,682,000,000 Philippine peso (2024)
- AUM: ▲US$2.26 billion (2023)
- Total assets: 127,254,000,000 Philippine peso (2024)
- Website: www.mic.gov.ph

The Maharlika Wealth Fund (MWF), also known as the Maharlika Investment Fund (MIF), is a sovereign wealth fund for the Philippines managed by the Maharlika Investment Corporation (MIC). The MIF is the Philippines' first sovereign wealth fund.

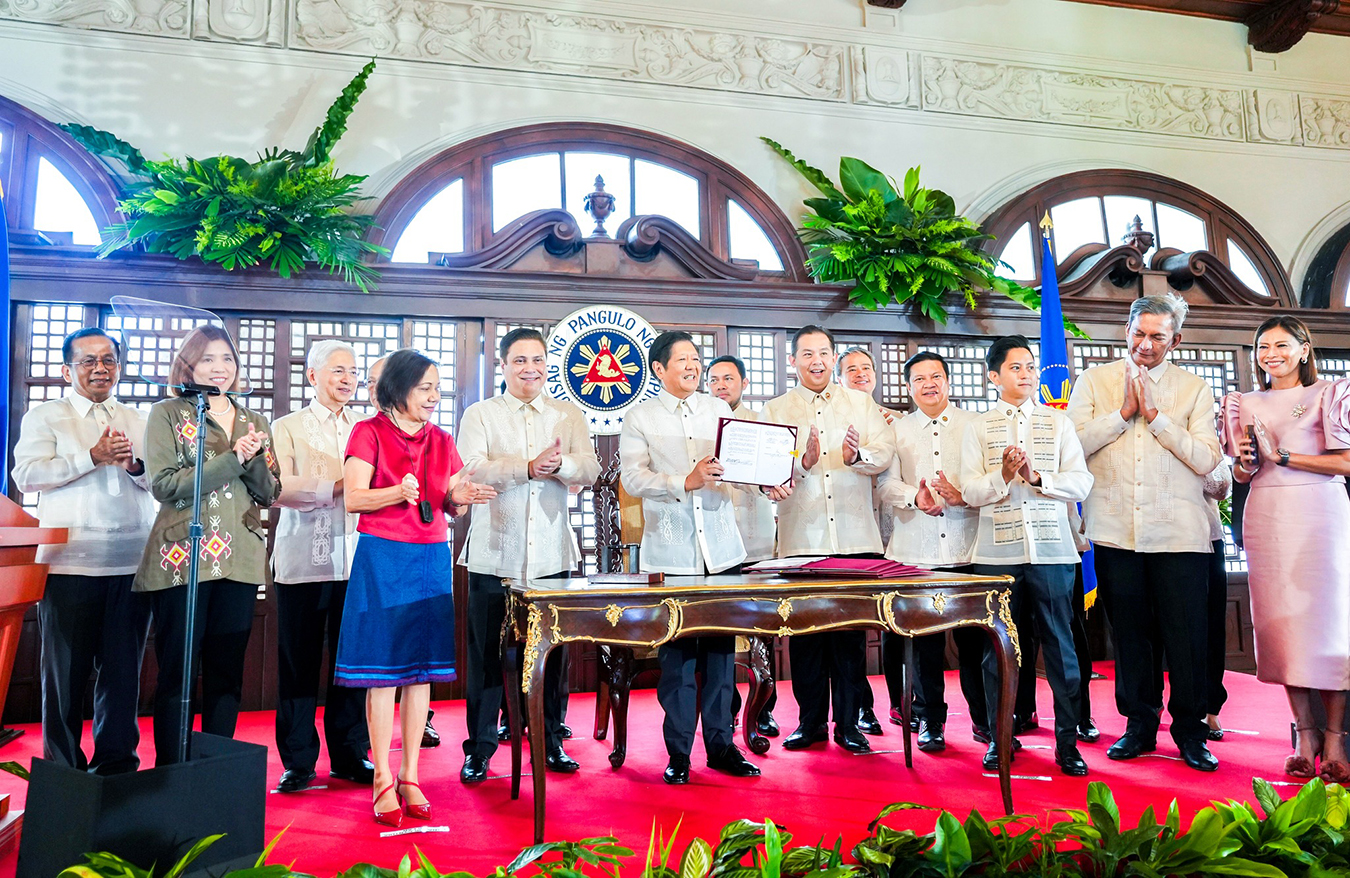
MIF Act of 2023 signing

== Background ==
=== Implementing law ===
==== Legislative process ====
Maharlika Investment Fund Act of 2023

Congress of the Philippines
- Long title: An Act Establishing the Maharlika Investment Fund, Providing for the Management, Investment, and Use of the Proceeds of The Fund, and Appropriating Funds Therefore
- Citation: Republic Act No. 11954
- Territorial extent: Philippines
- Passed by: House of Representatives of the Philippines
- Passed: December 15, 2022
- Passed by: Senate of the Philippines
- Passed: May 31, 2023
- Signed by: Bongbong Marcos
- Signed: July 18, 2023

Legislative history

Initiating chamber: House of Representatives of the Philippines
- Bill citation: H. No. 6608, 19th Cong. 1st Sess.
- Introduced: December 12, 2022
- First reading: December 12, 2022
- Second reading: December 15, 2022
- Third reading: December 15, 2022
- Voting summary: 279 voted for; 6 voted against; None abstained

Revising chamber: Senate of the Philippines
- Bill citation: S. No. 2020, 19th Cong., 1st Sess.
- Second reading: May 30, 2023
- Third reading: May 30, 2023
- Voting summary: 19 voted for; 1 voted against; 1 abstained; 3 absent
- Status: In force

In late November 2022, seven lawmakers in the Philippine House of Representatives, including Martin Romualdez and Sandro Marcos, filed House Bill No. 6398, (Note: House Bill No. 6398 was the original version of House Bill No. 6608.) proposing the creation of a sovereign wealth fund for the Philippines to be known as the Maharlika Wealth Fund (MWF), inspired from South Korea's sovereign wealth fund. The fund, if established, would be managed by the Maharlika Investments Corporation (MIC). President Ferdinand "Bongbong" R. Marcos, Jr. has backed the establishment of a sovereign wealth fund, believing that it would be advantageous for the country.

After Marcos Jr. certified to the Lower House the bill as urgent, it was passed on its third reading in the lower house, with 279 lawmakers voting in favor of passing the bill. Only six lawmakers voted against: Gabriel Bordado (Camarines Sur–3rd, Liberal), Arlene Brosas (Gabriela), France Castro (ACT Teachers), Mujiv Hataman (Basilan–Lone, Liberal), Edcel Lagman (Albay–1st, Liberal), and Raoul Manuel (Kabataan). From filing to approval, it took the House of Representatives 17 days to deliberate on the bill.

Around six months later on May 24, 2023, Marcos likewise did the same - certified the creation of the fund as urgent to the Upper House. A week later on May 31, 2023, the body approved the third and final reading with a total of 19 senators voting in favor, one negative (Risa Hontiveros) and one abstention (Nancy Binay). It would need active action of President Marcos' putting of his signature, or passivity of taking inaction on it within 30 days of its official transmittal to his office thus lapsing into, before it becomes law.

A bill that is certified as urgent allows lawmakers to bypass the constitutional rule requiring bills to be passed on three readings on separate days. The president's certification of urgency is typically made to respond to public calamities or emergencies. In February 2023, a petition was filed to the Supreme Court requesting to nullify Marcos's certification of urgency, arguing that it is unconstitutional because no public calamity or emergency was expressly stated in Marcos's letter to the House. This was later dismissed by the Court in May, citing that the petitioners "failed to present to Court any fact establishing the existence of an actual case or controversy ripe for adjudication".

On July 5, 2023, the copy of the bill was transmitted to Malacañang for President Marcos's signature. On July 18, he signed the bill into law as Republic Act No. 11954.

==== GSIS and SSS funding ====
Initially, the Government Service Insurance System (GSIS) and the Social Security System (SSS) were obliged to contribute funds to the MIF under the proposed bill establishing the fund. The two institutions were later dropped as mandatory contributors. However, both the boards of the GSIS and SSS would be permitted to contribute if they approve such a move.

==== Reception to the proposal ====
Economist Michael Batu said the fund, if managed properly, can help raise money to help the government's programs and achieve development goals. Global Source economist Romeo Bernardo, on the other hand, believes that the proposal is poorly timed and that a sovereign wealth fund would just add to the Philippines' current financial and fiscal risks and raised concern for potential mismanagement, mentioning the 1Malaysia Development Berhad scandal.

A group consisting of 12 organizations, namely the Foundation For Economic Freedom, Competitive Currency Forum, Filipina CEO Circle, Financial Executives Institute of the Philippines, Institute of Corporate Directors, Integrity Initiative, Inc., Makati Business Club, Management Association of the Philippines, Movement for Good Governance, Philippine Women's Economic Network, UP School of Economics Alumni Association and Women's Business Council Philippines, Inc., made a collective statement against the proposal. The group believes that there is no gap or "missing institution" in the Philippine economy that necessitates the creation of a sovereign wealth fund and prescribes the government to focus on the management of the country's fiscal deficit and public debt to avoid impediments to the delivery of public services and to prevent a downgrade of the Philippines' sovereign investment credit rating. It also notes that the Philippine economy has no commodity-based surpluses or surpluses from external trade from state-owned enterprises. It also opposed the idea of the GSIS and SSS contributing to the fund.

The Philippine Stock Exchange has made its support of the proposal, stating that the "primary mission is to facilitate the flow of capital into more productive and beneficial channels and as a result, contribute to efficient capital formation for the country".

The legislation also met criticisms. Critics see it as a plunder fund as, according to tax expert Raymond Abrea, the fund is "prone to corruption and money laundering". Economists remain skeptical about the bill as it contains provisions that could affect the independent functions of government financial institutions and the Bangko Sentral ng Pilipinas. In June 2023, University of the Philippines School of Economics faculty members issued a paper stating that the fund "violates fundamental principles of economics and finance and poses serious risks to the economy and the public sector – notwithstanding its proponents' good intentions". They emphasized its unclear purpose even after deliberations at the bicameral Congress, possible encroachment on the budget process, risks to public funds, moral-hazard risks, possible contradiction to other economic plans given its vagueness, red flags in governance structure, and unlikely substantial growth to finance projects as crucial points to consider.

Stressing the moral aspect, philosophy professor Jose Mario De Vega notes that the authors of this bill are relatives and friends of the Marcos Jr. administration and adds that Gloria Macapagal Arroyo’s defense of this bill has bolstered his belief that the measure is a sham and dangerous.

=== Establishment ===
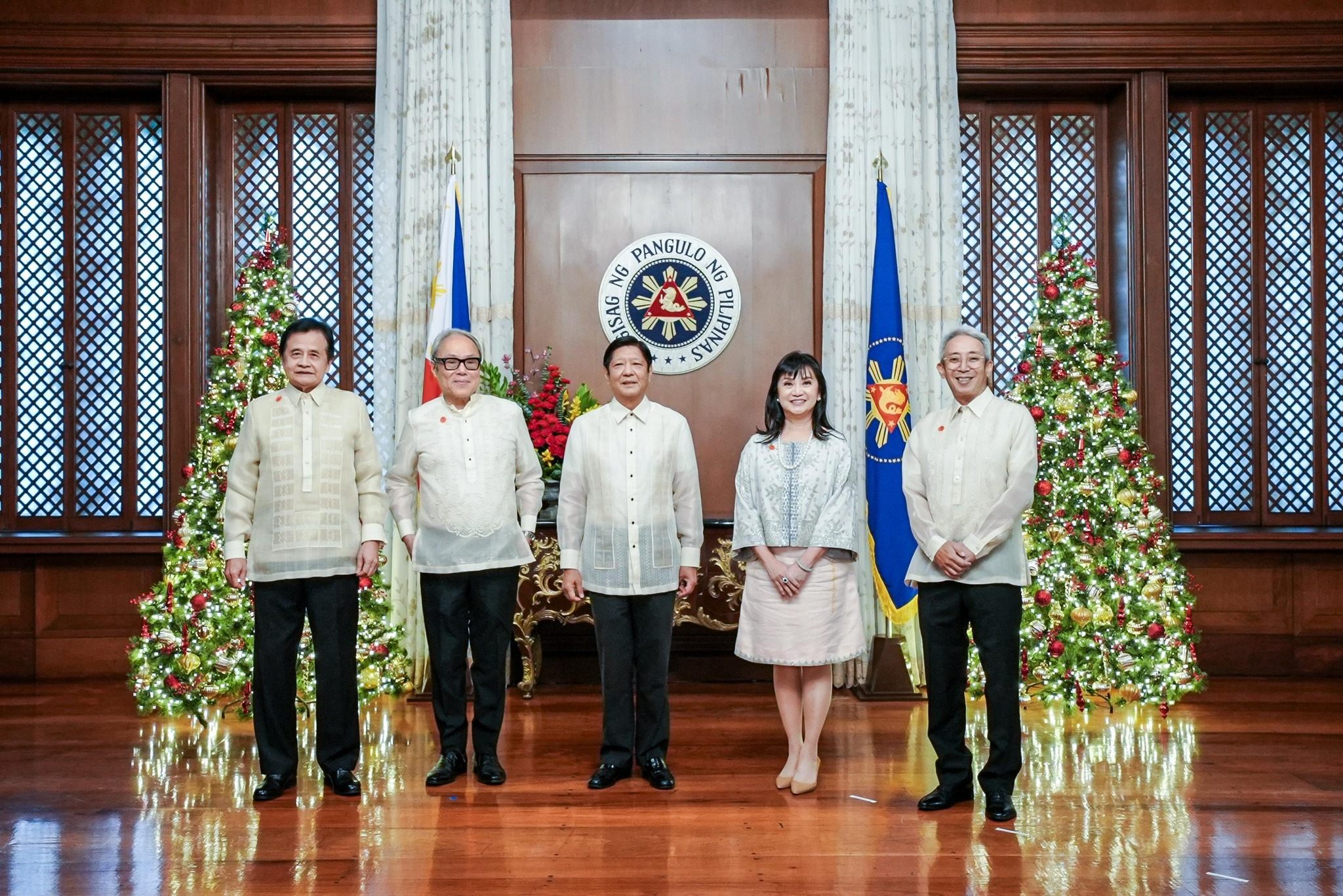
First set of directors appointed to the Maharlika Investment Corporation in 2023.

On October 12, 2023, President Ferdinand Marcos Jr. ordered the suspension of the implementing rules and regulations (IRR) of the laws setting up the Maharlika Investment Fund, claiming that he wanted to further study it "to ensure that the purpose of the fund will be realized for the country's development with safeguards in place for transparency and accountability."

On November 6, 2023, President Marcos Jr. announced that the IRR for the Maharlika Fund has been finalized, and he emphasized that they are pushing to have it operational before year-end. The revised IRR was published by the Official Gazette on November 10, 2023.

Rafael Consing Jr. was sworn in as the Maharlika Investment Corporation's president and CEO on November 24, 2023. Four directors were sworn in on December 20, including Vicky Castillo Tan, Andrew Jerome Gan, German Lichauco, and Roman Felipe Reyes.

On January 1, 2024, the Maharlika Investment Corporation held its inaugural board meeting. Rafael D. Consing, Jr., President, discussed the Fund’s capitalization and identified some potential sectors that may be tapped by the MIF.

On April 18, 2024, Maharlika Investment Corporation unveiled its official logo which principally honors the Flag of the Philippines and the Philippine eagle. The design reflects the themes of rebirth and renewal inspired by "Bagong Pilipinas.”

On September 24, 2026 it was reported that President & CEO Consing will be stepping down.One person says the reason is he was just limited to a 3-year term as part of the fund's corporate policiesbut Bilyonaryo's sources allege that it was because in reality his performance was "underwhelming" & thus with such dissatisfaction as well as alleged health issues of Consing, Malacanang ultimately decided against giving him another term.

== Investments ==
In January 2025, the MIC announced its intent to invest around $350 million into the National Grid Corporation of the Philippines (NGCP) through its parent company Synergy Grid and Development Philippines Inc. (SGP) for around 20% stake. With the purchase, the MIC could acquire two board seats at both the NGCP and SGP.. However, more than a year later this has still not been consummated.

In February 2025 the MIC joined together with the Charoen Pokphand Group, one of the largest conglomerate in Thailand, to start a $1 billion private equity fund.

The MIC agreed in February 2025 to provide the Makilala Mining Company Incorporated (MMCI) a $76.4 million bridge loan, which will be used to update the MMCI's feasibility study and Front-End Engineering Design.

In December 2025, MIC and the majority owners of the then listed Asian Terminals, Inc. (PSE: ATI) made public their intention to conduct a tender offer with a view to taking the company private and MIC becoming another major shareholder entitled to at least one board seat. The relevant transactions were done on the first quarter of 2025 with the ultimate delisting happening on April 3. MIC ended up with 11.94% of ATI's total outstanding shares.

On May 14, 2026 they had extended a 15 billion peso-revolving credit facility to Petron Corporation, especially and in light of it being the country's sole remaining oil refiner and to boost its capital for oil purchases within the greater backdrop of the current 2026 US-Iran War..

Around two weeks later, they were then targeting rehabilitation, modernization and further development of power infrastructure in Mindoro Island.

Of the quoted ₱75 billion to just over a hundred billion pesos of paid-up capital that the fund has received and are in control of, only ₱24.7 billion had been deployed as of June 30, 2026. MIC was still holding ₱53 billion in cash and cash equivalents, while another ₱50 billion subscribed by the National Government as part of Maharlika’s initial capitalization had yet to be released.

== Ownership ==
According to documents submitted to the PSE in connection with investment in ATI:

Major Shareholder	% of Total*	Common Shares	Preferred* Shares
Land Bank of the Philippines	40%	500,000,000 Paid up: (undisclosed)	(undisclosed)
Development Bank of the Philippines	20%	250,000,000 Paid up: (undisclosed)	(undisclosed)
Government of the Philippines	40%	500,000,000 Paid up: (nil)	(undisclosed)
Total Authorized	—	3,750,000,000	1,250,000,000
Total Outstanding/Subscribed	100.00%	1,250,000,000 (Paid up: ~ ₱100 billion)	—

*Total voting stock (i.e. common + voting preferred).

=== Board of directors ===
- Chairman: Finance Sec. Frederick D. Go
- Vice Chairperson: Rafael D. Consing, Jr.
- Members:
  - LBP President & CEO Ma. Lynette V. Ortiz
  - DBP President & CEO Michael O. de Jesus
  - BPI alumnus Rolando G. Peñaflor
- Independent Directors:
  - Enrico S. Cruz
  - Stephen Anthony T. CuUnjieng
  - German Q. Lichauco II
  - Roman Felipe S. Reyes

== Legal challenges ==
On September 18, 2023, Senate Minority Leader Koko Pimentel, representative Ferdinand Gaite (Bayan Muna), and former representatives Neri Colmenares and Carlos Isagani Zarate (Bayan Muna) filed a 56-page petition before the Supreme Court to ask the declaration of Maharlika Investment Fund Act of 2023 as unconstitutional. They claimed that it "entrusts hundreds of billions in public funds to unknown fund managers and an amorphous nine-member Board of Directors."

== Controversies ==
=== Basic Salary of Staff and the MIC President and CEO, Rafael D. Consing, Jr. ===
After the approval of the Maharlika Investment Corporation board, controversy arose on the salary of its President and CEO, Rafael D. Consing, Jr. A basic pay of PHP 2.5 million per month (~42,603 US Dollars as of prior month official exchange rates) amounting to PHP 30 million per year (US$ 511,247) (before other types of compensation such as bonuses that are normally given to executives) was requested by Consing Jr. which approached the overall compensation of BSP Governor Eli M. Remolona, Jr., (which amounted to PHP 35.48 million in 2023). Deliberations on the salary of Consing Jr. have caused significant delay on operations as the proposed salary was rejected. He defended his proposed salary as necessary for the sovereign wealth fund to recruit appropriate staff and to be at-par with the private sector. Government officials countered that the MIC was under the supervision of the Governance Commission for GOCC as it is a government entity and unlike the Bangko Sentral, was not granted fiscal autonomy.

Consing Jr. would further defend his position, saying that it will "bring in experience and technical expertise" as was needed by the MIC. An item of contention between Consing Jr. and government officials has been Republic Act No. 11954's lack of clarity on the pay of non-technical and highly technical staff. Non-technical staff were understood to have the pay equal to that of other government employees. Consing Jr. argued that highly technical staff should be paid in a way "comparable to the private sector."

To try breaking the impasse, unnamed government officials have countered with a proposal suggesting a lesser initial salary with a gradual increase upon the accomplishment of investments by the MIC.

== See also ==
Sovereign wealth fund
