= Nabua Church =

Roman Catholic church in Camarines Sur, Philippines

- Holy Cross Parish Church
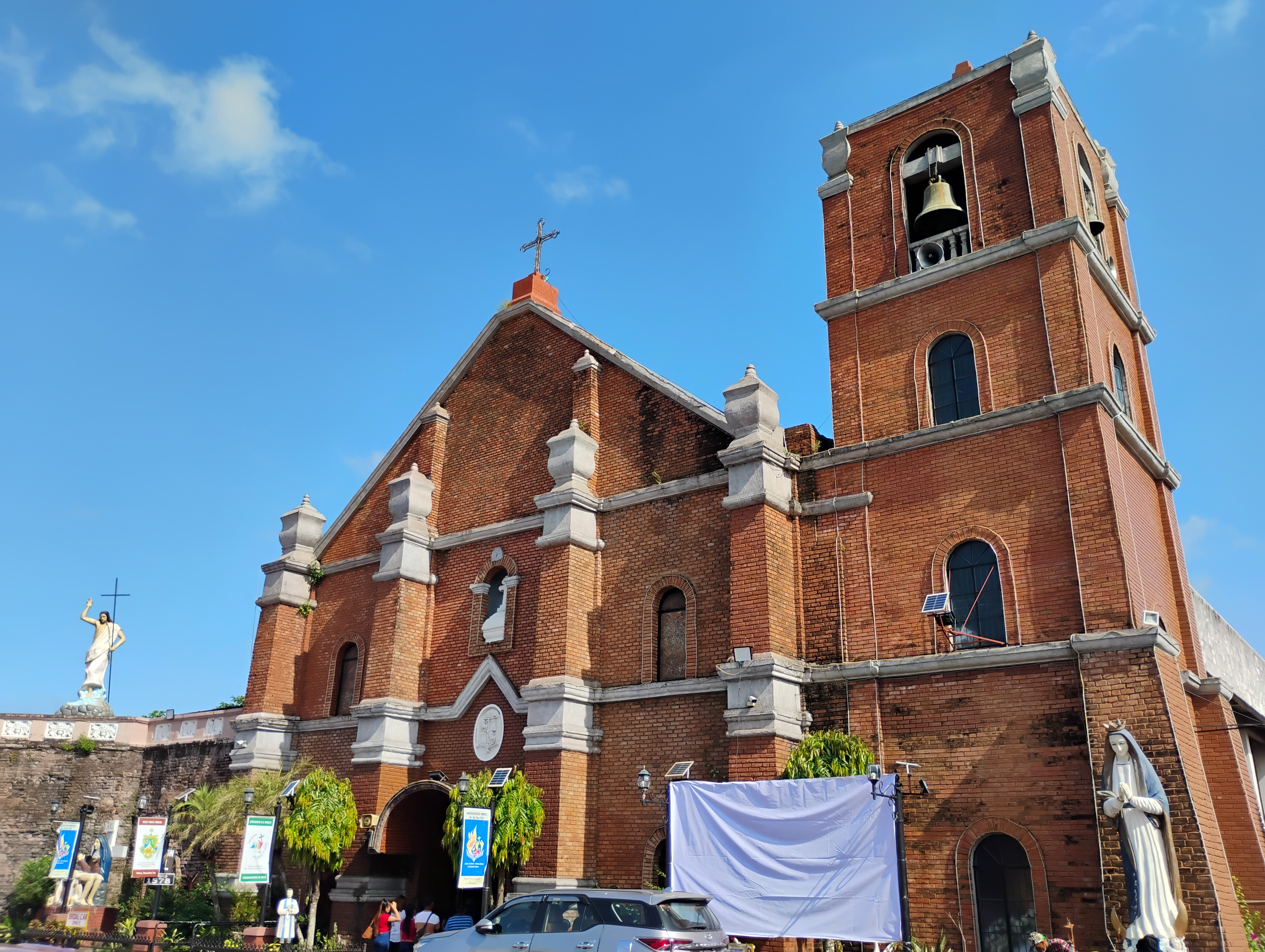
- Church facade in 2025

- Location in Luzon Location in the Philippines
- 13°24′26″N 123°22′21″E
- Location: Nabua, Camarines Sur
- Country: Philippines
- Denomination: Roman Catholic

History
- Status: Parish church
- Founded: 1578; 448 years ago

Architecture
- Functional status: Active
- Heritage designation: National Historical Landmark
- Designated: 1939
- Architectural type: Church building

Administration
- Archdiocese: Caceres

Holy Cross Parish Church, commonly known as Nabua Church, is a Roman Catholic church located in Nabua, Camarines Sur. It is under the jurisdiction of the Archdiocese of Caceres.

First built in 1578, the church suffered a fire incident and natural disasters in the 17th century, and was rebuilt several times. The current church building was completed in 1700.

The National Historical Commission of the Philippines (NHCP) declared it a national landmark and installed a historical marker on the church's facade in 1939. The church experienced flooding following the onslaught of Typhoon Usman in late 2018.

== Gallery ==
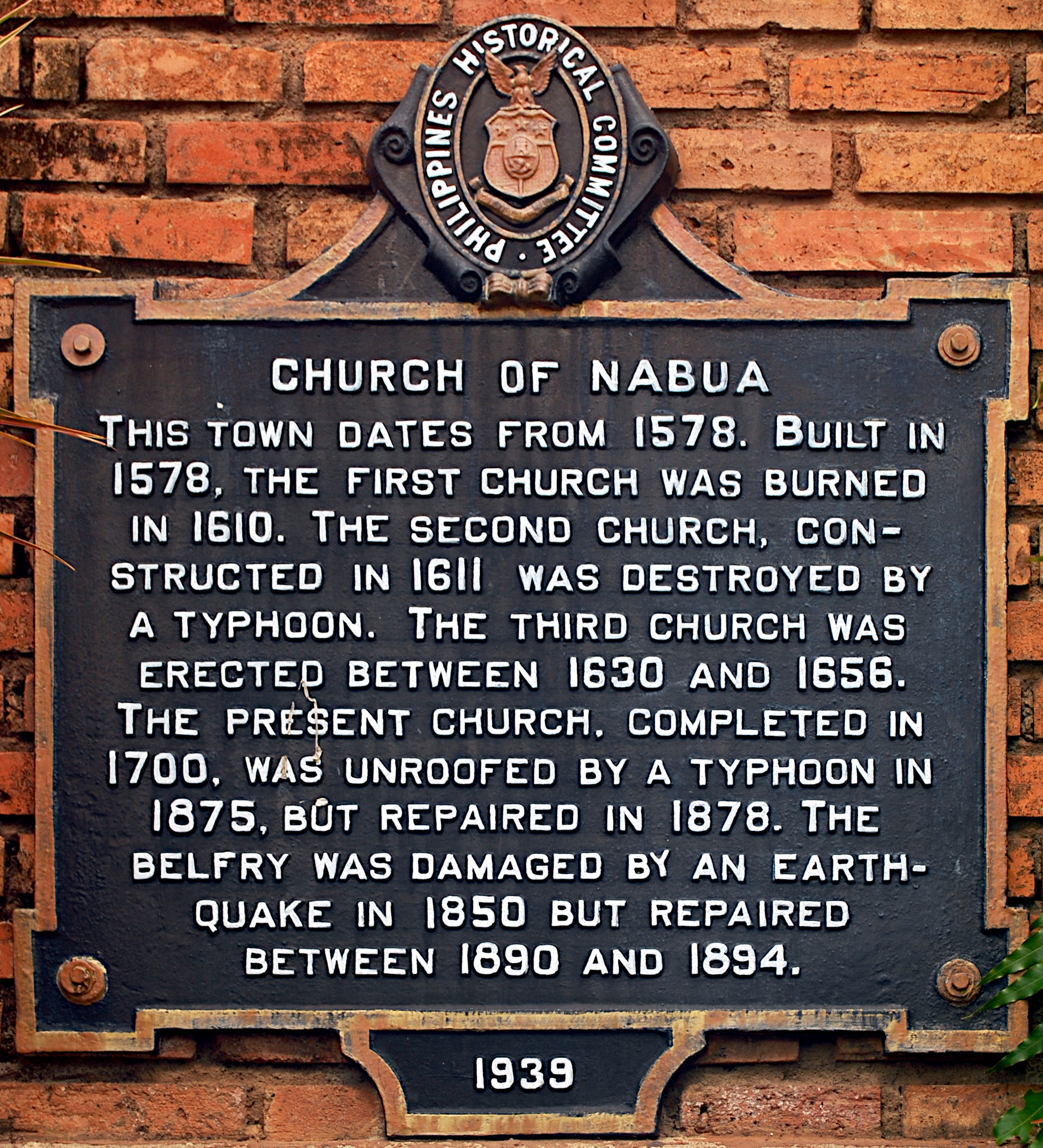
Church PHC historical marker installed in 1939

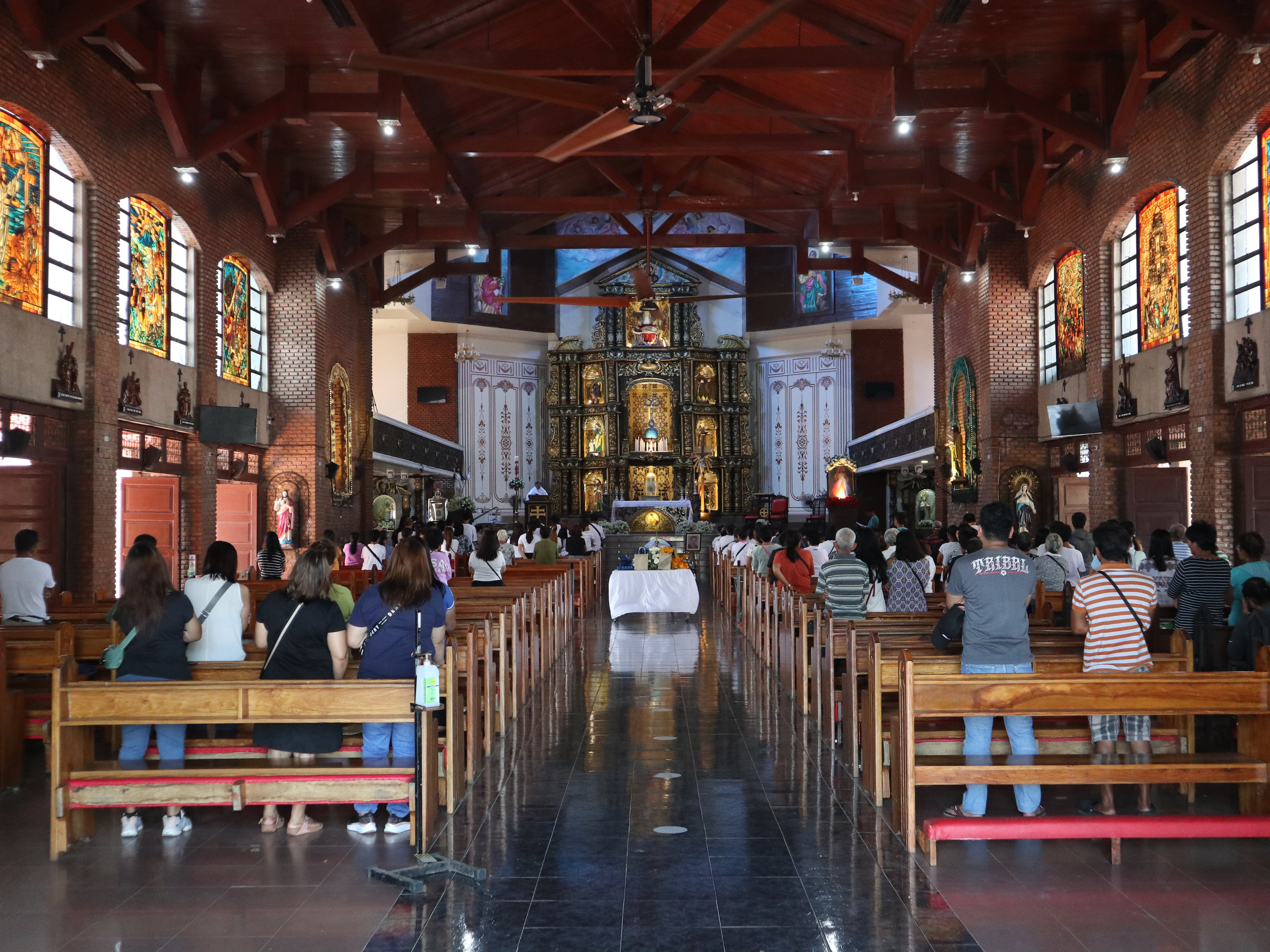
Church interior in 2023

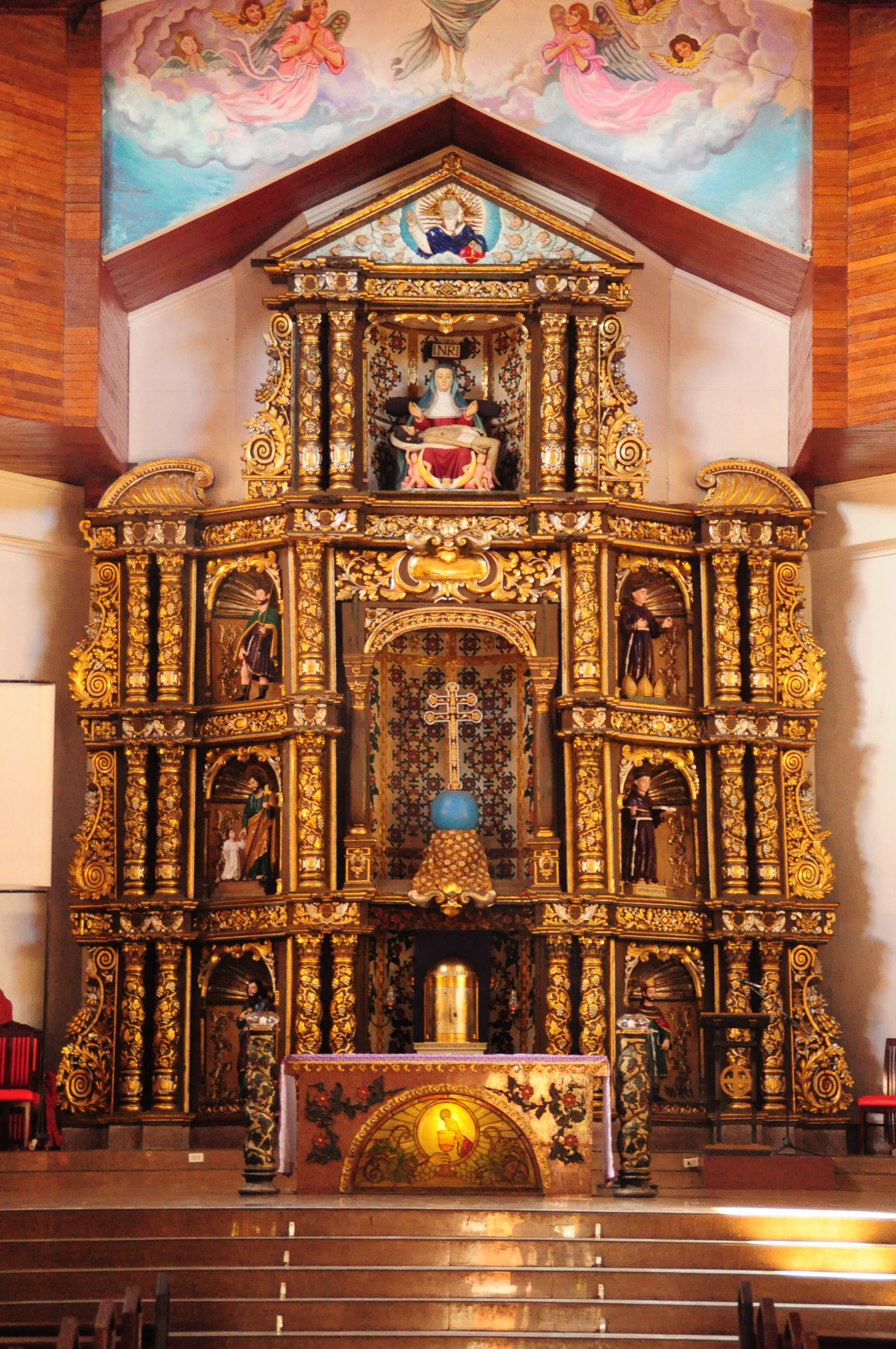
Retablo mayor in 2015
