= Tropical Depression Usman =

Western Pacific tropical depression in 2018

Tropical Depression 35W (Usman)
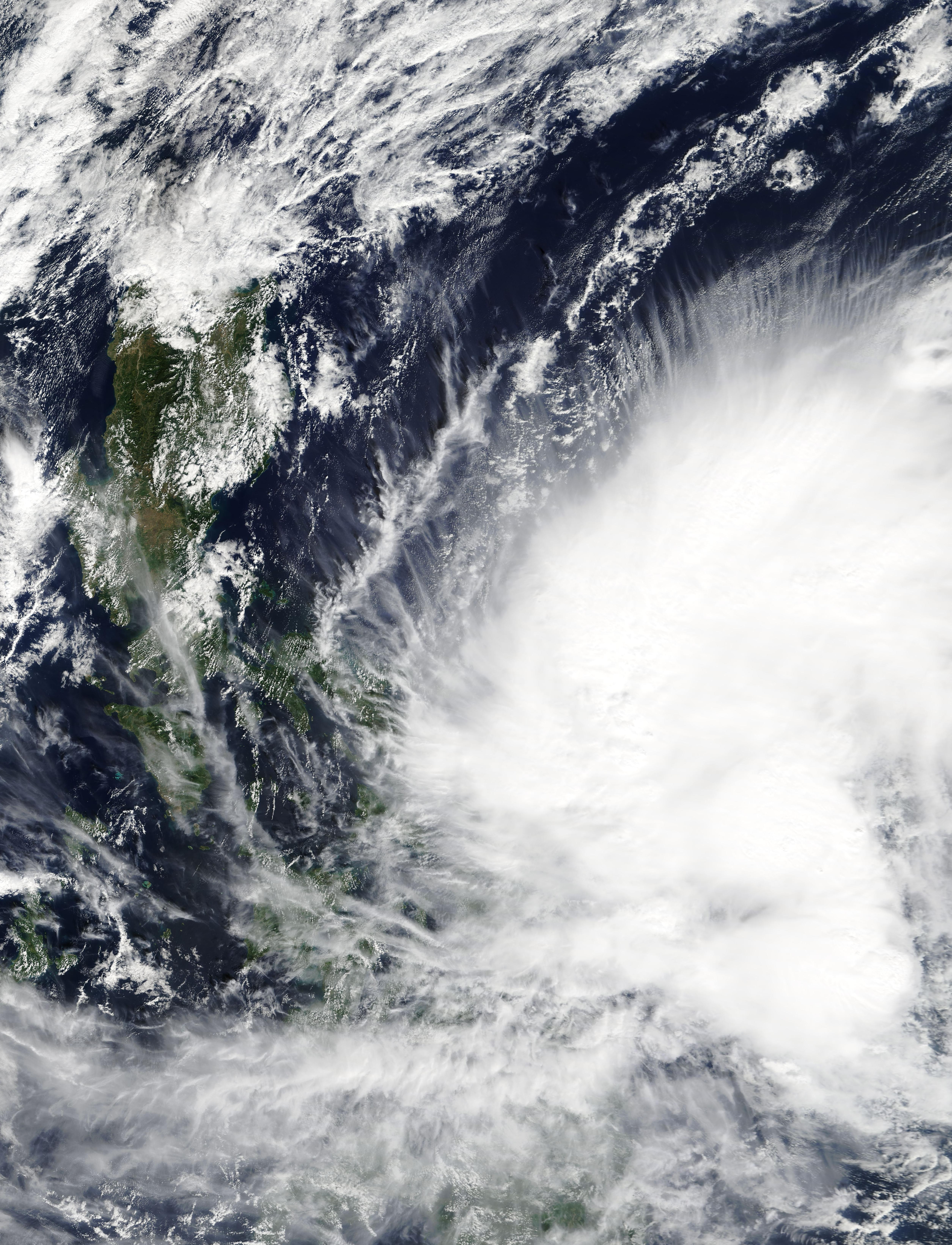
- Tropical Depression Usman nearing the Philippines on December 29

Meteorological history
- Formed: December 25, 2018
- Dissipated: December 29, 2018

Tropical depression
- 10-minute sustained (JMA)
- Highest winds: 55 km/h (35 mph)
- Lowest pressure: 1000 hPa (mbar); 29.53 inHg

Tropical depression
- 1-minute sustained (SSHWS/JTWC)
- Highest winds: 55 km/h (35 mph)
- Lowest pressure: 998 hPa (mbar); 29.47 inHg

Overall effects
- Fatalities: 156
- Missing: 26
- Damage: $103 million (2018 USD)
- Areas affected: Caroline Islands, Philippines
- IBTrACS
- Part of the 2018 Pacific typhoon season

Tropical Depression Usman was a weak but deadly tropical cyclone that impacted the southern Philippines in late December 2018. Tropical Depression Usman originated first as a low-pressure area to the east of Palau on December 23. Slowly intensifying, the system became a tropical depression two days later. The system maintained its intensity while moving in a general west-northwestward direction approaching the eastern portion of the Philippine islands. However, due to unfavorable conditions, the depression weakened into a remnant low on December 29, while making landfall over Eastern Samar thereafter.

While the system possessed weaker winds, it brought torrential rainfall over much of Visayas, hitting the regions of Eastern Visayas and Bicol the hardest. Sea travel to the country was vastly disrupted during the holiday season. Torrential rain caused flooding to as high as 7 feet (2.1 meters) in Northern Samar. An estimated 36,000 houses were damaged due to Usman. A total of 156 people perished during storm, while 26 people remain missing. Damage from Usman is estimated to be about ₱5.41 billion (US$103 million). After the season, the PAGASA struck off the name Usman from their naming lists because it exceeded more than ₱1 billion worth of damages.

== Meteorological history ==
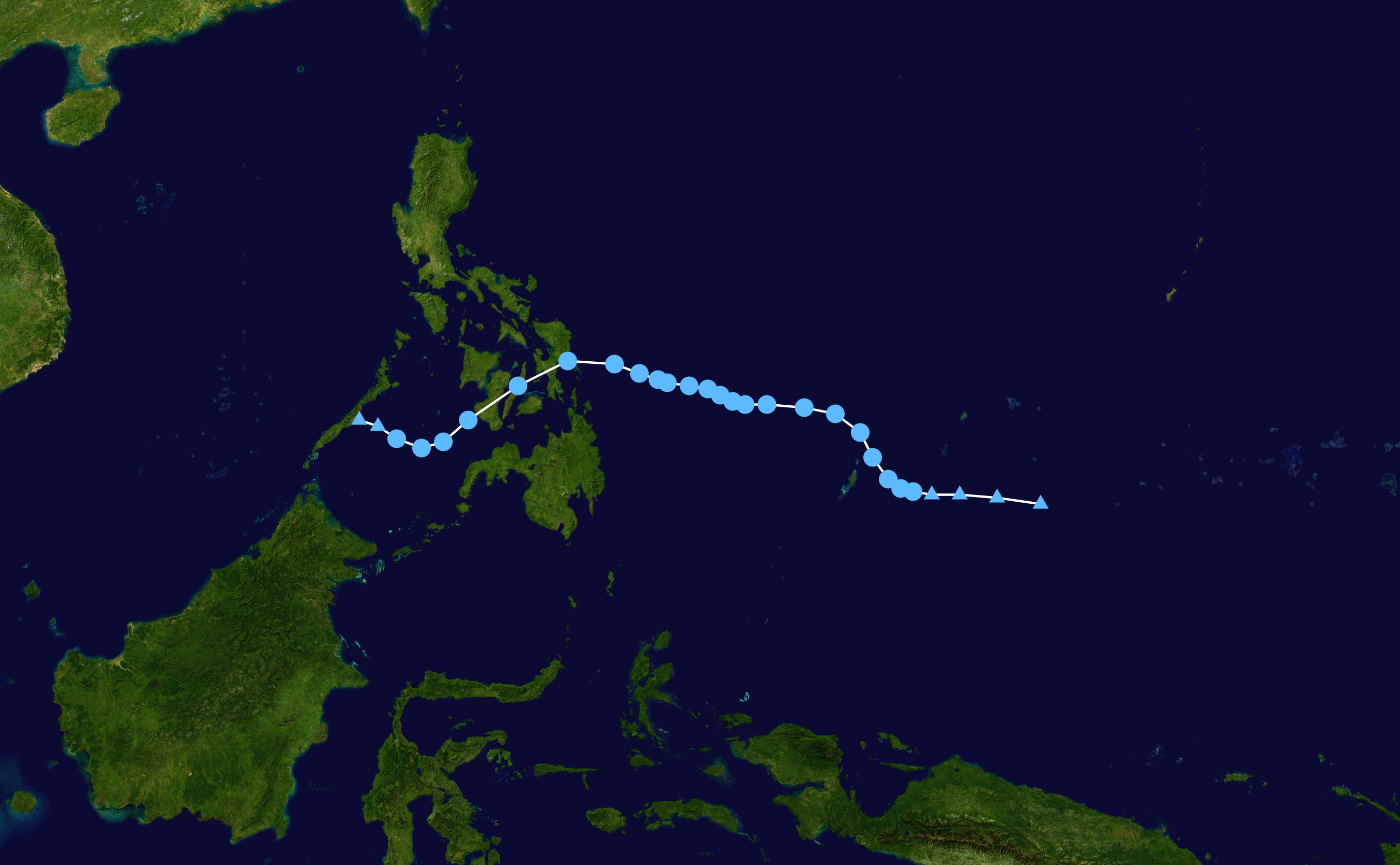
Map plotting the storm's track and intensity, according to the Saffir–Simpson scale Map key Saffir–Simpson scale Tropical depression (≤38 mph, ≤62 km/h) Tropical storm (39–73 mph, 63–118 km/h) Category 1 (74–95 mph, 119–153 km/h) Category 2 (96–110 mph, 154–177 km/h) Category 3 (111–129 mph, 178–208 km/h) Category 4 (130–156 mph, 209–251 km/h) Category 5 (≥157 mph, ≥252 km/h) Unknown Storm type Tropical cyclone Subtropical cyclone Extratropical cyclone, remnant low, tropical disturbance, or monsoon depression

On December 23, the Joint Typhoon Warning Center (JTWC) began monitoring a tropical disturbance that had developed about 657 km (409 mi) to the east of Palau. Around that time, the system was located in an area of moderate vertical wind shear and warm 28–30 °C (82.4–86 °F) sea-surface temperatures. The disturbance slowly intensified and the JTWC issued a tropical cyclone formation alert at about 09:00 UTC on December 24. At that time, the convection, or thunderstorm activity, around the system's low-level circulation center was rather sheared. Dvorak estimates were around T1.5 at the time, signalling that the system had 1-minute sustained winds of 45 km/h (30 mph). This prompted the JTWC to upgrade the disturbance to a tropical depression, with the system receiving the designation 35W. By 21:00 UTC of the same day, visible satellite imagery showed shallow rain banding (which is a cloud structure that is associated with an area of rain and thunderstorms) wrapping into a tight, but exposed center, with poorly organized convection. The Japan Meteorological Agency (JMA) declared the system to be a weak tropical depression at around 06:00 UTC of December 25. Around the same time, the Philippine Atmospheric, Geophysical and Astronomical Services Administration (PAGASA) had reported that the depression had entered their area of responsibility and assigned the local name Usman.

The JMA began issuing advisories on 12:00 UTC of December 25, when they considered that the tropical depression had 10-minute sustained winds of 55 km/h (35 mph). With Usman's ragged center, the system remained disorganized, as wind shear was becoming displaced to the northwest. By 03:00 UTC on December 26, satellite imagery depicted that the system had multiple, minor circulation centers revolving around its original center. The storm's structure became somewhat disorganized due to the lack of convection, being blown off by the southeasterly wind shear. The system maintained its intensity until the next day, when satellite imagery showed a broad circulation with excellent outflow along with extensive deep convection flaring near its center. At this point, both the JMA and the JTWC predicted that the system would intensify into a tropical storm within the next 24 hours. Thereafter, convection had increased around the system, and the system's center became much more organized. At 00:00 UTC on December 28, the JTWC reported that the system's 1-minute sustained winds to 55 km/h (35 mph). A cold cold cover began obscuring the system's elongated center, thereafter. On December 29, the system's central cold cover began to dissipate, and the JTWC had stated that the system began weakening and deteriorating. Tropical Depression Usman made landfall in Borongan, Eastern Samar on 06:00 UTC of the same day, as the PAGASA downgraded the system to a low-pressure area. The JMA stated that the system was located in an area of increasing wind shear. Several hours later, both the JMA and the JTWC issued their final advisory on the system.

== Preparations and impact ==
On December 27, as Tropical Depression Usman inches closer to the eastern portion of the Philippines, the PAGASA raised a Tropical Cyclone Warning Signal #1 over much of the Bicol region and the Eastern Visayas region, with some even extending as north as Quezon province and as west as Cebu. Local officials advised residents at that time to take precautionary measures in areas of low-lying and mountainous areas, especially those living near river channels. The PAGASA also warned on sea travel, either to fishermen or those with small sea crafts, are risky in the seaboards of Southern Luzon, Central Luzon and the Surigao provinces due to rough seas combined with the northeast monsoon. Heavy rains that could trigger landslides and flashfloods were expected in the areas under the alert signals. Roughly 1,000 passengers later became stranded in Bacolod after sea travel was suspended. The region of Western Visayas, which includes the island of Palawan, was raised a TCWS #1 on December 28, as 851 passengers were stranded in that region alone. On 5 p.m. local time, the NDRRMC raised the "blue alert" status in much of the Western Visayas region, meaning that 50 percent of the RDRRMC personnel are on standby for emergencies and it is the second highest alert level. Moreover, the number of passengers stranded from the cause of suspended sea travel rose to 13,000, where 6,000 of them were from the Bicol Region. In the city of Tacloban, their mayor ordered to suspend work in government offices and their local officials have set up 71 evacuation centers ready for displaced families.

Following the landfall and the deterioration of the tropical depression, widespread flooding and landslides were reported in many areas. Six towns in Masbate saw 61 families, or 259 individuals forced to evacuate their homes due to extreme flooding. Local officials in the area also lifted the temporary ban for sea travel on the morning of December 29 to allow the remaining stranded passengers to travel. This was the same in the Bicol Region were 3,900 people were evacuated. In Northern Samar, the heavy rained caused flooding to as high as 2–7 ft (0.6–2.1 m). In Bicol, 473.1 mm (18.6 in) of rain was recorded for the two days of December 28 and 29. Strong winds and heavy rain from Usman caused the shutdown of some power plants, which led to power outages in some areas In Albay, Catanduanes and Eastern Visayas. On December 30, a state of calamity was raised in the provinces of Camarines Sur, Camarines Norte and Sorsogon, along with the municipality of Polangui in Albay. Eight other municipalities in Oriental Mindoro were also raised a state of calamity by local officials on the next day.

Throughout the country, a total of 238,127 families were affected by Usman. About 36,574 houses were either partially or totally damaged. A total of 156 people have died from the storm, with 105 people being injured. 26 people have remained missing. An estimated cost of damages were toppled to ₱5.41 billion (US$103 million), where ₱1.95 billion (US$37.1 million) were to be part of agricultural damages and ₱3.46 billion (US$65.9 million) were to be part of infrastructure damages.

== Aftermath and retirement ==
In January 2019, Mahar Lagmay, a disaster scientist, claimed that the high death toll by the system was caused by the PAGASA issuing incorrect and misleading forecasts for Tropical Depression Usman. The PAGASA then responded to the scientist's statement regarding this claim, and stated that Lagmay had used the "hour rainfall intensity" classification instead of the "24-hour accumulated rainfall" classification, where it has been used commonly in their tropical cyclone bulletins. Local officials also criticised the PAGASA due to the fact how their residents became confused and complacent when Usman was downgraded to a low-pressure area, which also meant the PAGASA lifting any storm signals. The PAGASA later addressed and confirmed this, however they explained that the storm signals are distinct from the amount of rainfall accumulated, as the signals described more of the expected winds in the area. They also added that they did release a weather advisory on the low-pressure area (that was once Usman) on December 29 regarding that "moderate to heavy rains will continue over Bicol Region in the next 24 hours."

Because the system caused damages of over ₱1 billion, Usman was retired by PAGASA and will never be used again as a typhoon name within the Philippine Area of Responsibility (PAR), despite it being used for the first time in their naming lists. In March 2019, the PAGASA revised their lists and replaced the name with Umberto to replace Usman for the 2022 season.

== See also ==
- Weather of 2018
- Tropical cyclones in 2018
- Tropical Depression Winnie (2004)
- Tropical Depression Auring (2009)
- Tropical Storm Washi (2011)
- Tropical Storm Nalgae (2022)
