= Jose Juliano =

Filipino physicist

Jose O. Juliano
- Born: Jose Ochoa Juliano Jr. October 16, 1932 (age 93); Calamba, Philippines
- Education: University of the Philippines, Diliman (BS); Louisiana State University (MS); University of California, Berkeley (PhD)
- Spouse: Victoria Galang
- Children: 3
- Awards: Ten Outstanding Young Men (1959)
- Scientific career
- Fields: Nuclear Chemistry, Physics
- Workplaces: Calamba Medical Center
- Thesis: Coincidence Nuclear Spectrometry With Applications To Europium-154 And Europium-155 (1957)

Jose Ochoa Juliano Jr. (born October 16, 1932) is a Filipino physicist, nuclear chemist, and hospital administrator.

== Early life and education ==
Juliano was born on October 16, 1932 in Calamba, Philippines to a family of scholars: botanist father Jose B. Juliano and dental surgeon mother Teodora Ochoa. Juliano also had 3 brothers: Bienvenido, Petronilo, and Rogelio.

Juliano graduated with two Bachelor of Science degrees in agricultural chemistry and mathematics from the University of the Philippines Diliman as, both, a member of Upsilon Sigma Phi and with magna cum laude honors in 1952.

After completing his undergraduate education, Juliano then moved to the United States to pursue graduate studies. Juliano graduated with a Master of Science degree in electrochemistry and chemical engineering with an emphasis in sugar technology from Louisiana State University in 1954, and a Doctor of Philosophy degree in nuclear chemistry and physics from the University of California (n/k/a University of California, Berkeley) in 1957. His doctoral dissertation was titled Coincidence Nuclear Spectrometry With Applications To Europium-154 And Europium-155.

== Career, awards, and Calamba Medical Center ==
Juliano worked as an affiliate for the American Nuclear Society, American Physical Society and American Chemical Society. He was awarded the 1st annual Ten Outstanding Young Men (TOYM) award for his participation in the nuclear physics in 1959. Since 1995 he was a consultant of Canlubang, Industrial Estate and from 1993 to 2002 worked at the National Academy of Science and Technology. From 1996 to 1998 he worked as undersecretary for international relations, Department of Trade and Industry and by 1999 became a president and CEO of the Calamba Medical Center board. During his tenure as president, Juliano teamed up with "chair Efren Recto in convincing the erstwhile conservative directors to start relying on bank loans for expansion" of the medical center which resulted in "the construction of a couple of building annexes."

== Personal life ==
Juliano is married to Victoria Juliano (née Galang). The couple have three children together, all of whom have medical careers: Jose Enrico (son), Joji (daughter), and Catherine (daughter).
