= Calamba Medical Center =

Private hospital in Laguna, Philippines

- CMC Tower 1 (left) and 2 in August 2018

Geography
- Location: CMC Avenue, Brgy. Real, Calamba, Laguna, Philippines
- Coordinates: 14°12′22″N 121°09′06″E

Organization
- Type: Private-Service

Services
- Standards: ISO 9001: 2015 accredited
- Emergency department: Level-Trauma
- Beds: More than 122

History
- Opened: May 1989; 36 years ago

Links
- Website: cmc.ph
- Lists: Hospitals in the Philippines

Calamba Medical Center (CMC) is a private hospital in Calamba, located in the province of Laguna, Philippines. The medical center started as a 25-bed hospital in 1989.

== Facilities ==
The medical center built a new 12-storey tower, now CMC Tower 1, in 2011, which was the tallest building in Calamba. The hospital also constructed a nine-storey hospital, CMC Tower 2, in 2018. Tower 1 serves as the medical arts building while the hospital is in Tower 2.

The hospital includes a diagnostic center, an eye center, a dialysis center, kidney center, clinic, offices and a function hall. Calamba Medical Center or CMC is a regional private hospital in the whole Calabarzon. Next to it is the St. Cruz Laguna Polydemic Hospital in Santa Cruz, Laguna.

In 2020, the center established a new cancer treatment center with the first linear accelerator in the province. This is an advanced device to provide radiotherapy. The center's clinics will also provide chemotherapy.
