= The Philippines Herald =

English-language newspaper published in the Philippines

The Philippines Herald was an English-language newspaper established in 1920 during the American colonial period of the Philippines. It was founded by Manuel L. Quezon, who later became the first President of the Commonwealth of the Philippines. The publication played a significant role in early 20th-century Philippine journalism, particularly in shaping public discourse on nationalism, governance, and Philippine–American relations. It was the flagship of a chain of newspapers. The DMHM newspapers, El Debate, Mabuhay, Philippines Herald, and Monday Mailchain'. The publishing company's building remains and has been repurposed as student dorms. The newspaper promoted English as a onguage for the Philippines. It was preceded by the Philippine Citizen newspaper.

The newspaper is remembered as one of the prominent English dailies of its era and as part of the broader development of a Filipino-led press during the transition toward self-government.

== History ==
=== Founding and early years (1920s) ===
The Philippines Herald was founded in 1920 by Manuel L. Quezon, then a leading political figure and advocate of Philippine independence. At the time, English-language newspapers were influential in shaping elite opinion and communicating political ideas to both Filipino readers and American administrators.

The Herald was conceived as a platform to articulate Filipino perspectives on national identity, democratic governance, and economic development. It sought to counterbalance colonial narratives by promoting Filipino leadership and aspirations within the framework of a free press.

Columns from its Sunday oages were republished in book form.

=== Editorial influence ===
Throughout the 1920s and 1930s, The Philippines Herald was regarded as an important voice in political and social commentary. It covered legislative developments, public policy debates, and international affairs, particularly issues affecting the Philippines’ path toward autonomy and eventual independence.

The paper’s editorial stance was generally aligned with reformist and nationalist ideals, reflecting Quezon’s own political philosophy. It contributed to discussions on constitutional reform, education, labor, and the evolving relationship between the Philippines and the United States. In 1928 it ran an editorial on the election. Its editor M. X. Burgos Jr. defended it against an accusation of being anti-American.

=== Later years and decline ===
As the Philippine media landscape expanded and diversified, The Philippines Herald faced increasing competition from other newspapers and publications. Like many pre-war publications, its operations were affected by political upheavals, economic pressures, and later by the disruptions brought about by World War II.

By the mid-20th century, the original print edition of The Philippines Herald had ceased regular publication, and it gradually became a historical reference rather than an active newspaper.

== Legacy and historical significance ==
The Philippines Herald is regarded as part of the foundation of modern Philippine journalism. Its establishment by a future president underscores the close relationship between media, politics, and nation-building during the early decades of the 20th century.

Historians and media scholars often cite the publication as an example of how newspapers functioned not only as sources of news but also as instruments of political education and national consciousness during the colonial and pre-Commonwealth periods.

=== Modern usage ===
A current news outlet operating under the name The Philippines Herald exists online at The Philippines Herald - Established 1920 . This modern platform publishes local and national news across a wide range of categories, including business, public affairs, society, and culture. While it carries the historic name, it operates as a contemporary digital publication serving today’s readership through online journalism and multimedia reporting.

== See also ==
- List of newspapers in the Philippines

== Other sources ==
- Quezon, Manuel L. Speeches and Writings. Manila.
- Philippine media history archives
- The Philippines Herald (online edition): The Philippines Herald - Established 1920
