= Jose R. Velasco =

Filipino physiologist (1916–2007)

Jose R. Velasco ONS
- Born: February 4, 1916; Imus, Cavite, Philippine Islands
- Died: January 24, 2007 (aged 90); Imus, Cavite, Philippines
- Resting place: Diocesan Shrine of Saint Therese of the Child Jesus Ossuary, University of the Philippines Los Baños, Los Baños, Laguna
- Awards: Order of National Scientists of the Philippines (1998)
- Scientific career
- Fields: chemistry and plant physiology

Jose R. Velasco (February 4, 1916 – January 24, 2007) was a Filipino plant physiologist and agricultural chemist noted for his research on soil and plant nutrition and on coconut diseases. In 1998, he was recognized as a National Scientist of the Philippines.

== Early life and education ==
Velasco was born in Imus, Cavite. After nearly flunking out of a vocational high school, he transferred to an agricultural high school (now the Central Luzon State University Science High School), where he graduated salutatorian. Velasco enrolled in what was then the University of the Philippines College of Agriculture (now the University of the Philippines Los Baños) in Laguna province. He graduated at the top of his class in 1940 with a degree in agriculture, major in Agricultural Chemistry. Upon graduation, Velasco joined the faculty of the University of the Philippines and remained there for the duration of World War II, during which he endured a brief period of incarceration by the Japanese army. After the war, Velasco pursued graduate studies in the United States and obtained a Ph.D in plant physiology from the University of California, Berkeley in 1949. He re-joined the faculty of the University of the Philippines and remained there until 1967.

== Contributions to agricultural science ==
During World War II, Velasco conducted research on the photoperiodism of the rice plant. Among his findings, which were published only after the end of the war, was that the Elon-elon variety flowered during short days when there was less than 12 hours of light.

Velasco was also noted for his research on the physiology of the coconut, a common crop in the Philippines. He studied the mineral nutrition of areas planted to coconut, the development and utilization of coconut products, and the nature and cause of cadang-cadang, a disease that plagued the crop of small coconut farmers throughout the country. With respect to cadang-cadang, Velasco was skeptical of the still-prevalent view that the disease was viral in nature, and devoted considerable effort to prove his thesis that it was caused by an element in the soil that was toxic to the coconut plant.

== Citations ==
In 1967, Velasco was appointed Commissioner of the National Institute of Science and Technology, a position he held for 10 years. Even though his duties were administrative in nature, he continued to work on various research projects using the NIST laboratories.

In 1998, Velasco was named a National Scientist of the Philippines by President Fidel Ramos. His official citation acknowledged, among others, his research in photoperiodism and on the physiology of the coconut plant.
