= Carmen C. Velasquez =

Filipino parasitologist (1913–1994)

Carmen C. Velasquez ONS
- Born: Carmen Camacho; August 7, 1913; Bayambang, Pangasinan
- Died: October 16, 1994 (aged 81); Quezon City, Philippines
- Education: University of the Philippines Diliman; University of Michigan
- Awards: Order of National Scientists of the Philippines (1983)
- Scientific career
- Fields: Parasitology
- Workplaces: University of the Philippines Diliman

Carmen Camacho Velasquez (August 7, 1913 – October 16, 1994) was a Filipino parasitologist. She specialized in parasites of the tropical fish of the Philippines. She is known for her work on the taxonomy of Digenea and was the first to describe the parasitic nematode Capillaria philippinensis, which causes intestinal capillariasis in humans.

Velasquez discovered 32 new species and a genus of digenetic trematodes. She was named a National Scientist of the Philippines in 1983.

== Early life and education ==
Carmen Camacho was born on August 7, 1913, in Bayambang, Pangasinan. She attended the University of the Philippines Diliman, earning a bachelor of science in zoology in 1934. Afterwards, she worked as a student assistant in the Department of Zoology of the University of the Philippines.

Velasquez continued her studies at the University of Michigan through a Barbour scholarship and was influenced by helminthologist George R. La Rue. She earned her MS in zoology in 1937. She returned to the University of the Philippines in 1939, teaching in the Zoology department. She published a paper in 1951 describing a parasitic copepod species. She earned a PhD in parasitology from the University of the Philippines in 1954. Her thesis concerned the spread of Ascaris eggs and their resistance in the Philippines. She was the first person to receive a PhD in parasitology from the University of the Philippines.

Velasquez became a member of the American Society of Parasitologists in 1958. She received Guggenheim Fellowships for 1957–1958 and 1963.

== Career ==
Velasquez was hired as an assistant professor at the University of the Philippines Diliman in the Department of Zoology in 1966. She chaired the department from 1973 to 1976 and held the Professional Chair in Zoology from 1973 to 1977. She taught both parasitology and zoology.

One of Velasquez's interests was zoonotically important helminths; over 70 of her publications were dedicated to the life cycles and taxonomy of parasitic worms. She also researched the life cycles of heterophyid trematodes and trematodes of the Capsalidae family as well as the characteristics of Cestoda.

Velasquez discovered 32 new species as well as a genus of digenetic trematodes found in 13 species of fish endemic to the Philippines. She conducted research into parasites of fish that are commonly used in Filipino cuisine, including the copepods that spend part of their life cycles in the intestines and gills of tilapia, giant trevally, maya-maya, milkfish, and the lobed river mullet. Velasquez was involved in the discovery of intestinal capillariasis in humans in the Philippines. In 1968, she described the parasitic nematode Capillaria philippinensis, which had been found in the intestines of a Filipino man from Ilocos Sur.

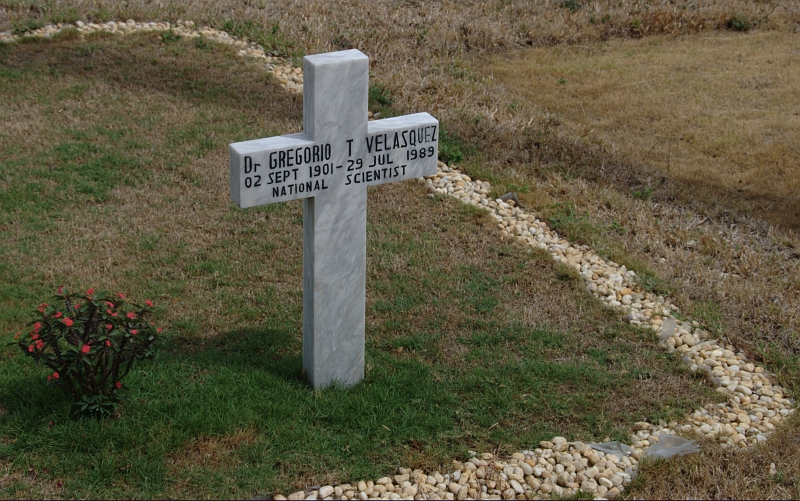
Gregorio Velasquez's grave at the Libingan ng mga Bayani.

Velasquez studied the taxonomy of Digenea. Her 1975 book, Digenetic Trematodes of Philippine Fishes, is a compilation of studies on fish parasitology. It was the first monograph dedicated to southeast Asian fish parasitology and serves as a guide for aquaculture and fisheries management.

She retired from the UP Department of Zoology in 1978 and was named Professor Emeritus of Zoology in 1979. Following her retirement, she set up a laboratory in her house to continue her research into parasitology.

She was a visiting professor at the University of Maryland and served as an editor for the Philippine Science Encyclopedia and the Asian Fisheries Science Journal. She served on the executive council of the National Academy of Science and Technology and was an advisor to the Philippine Council for Agriculture, Aquatic, and Natural Resources Research and Development.

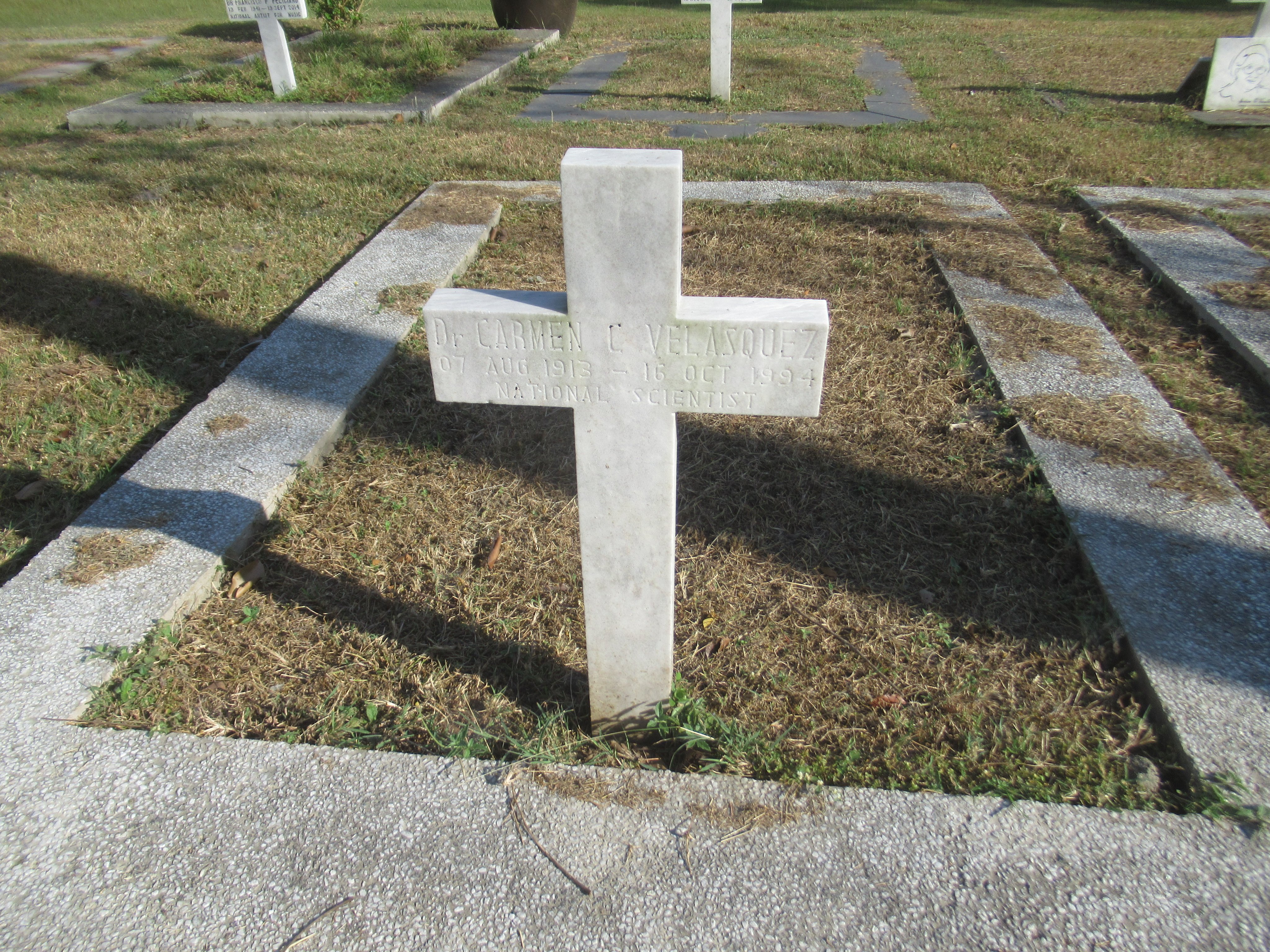
Velasquez's grave at the Libingan ng mga Bayani.

== Personal life ==
Velasquez married phycologist and fellow National Scientist Gregorio T. Velasquez in 1935. They had three daughters—Julieta, Emperatriz, and Milagros Elena.

Velasquez died on October 16, 1994, in Quezon City.

== Awards ==
- Distinguished Service Medal and Honorary Diploma of the Republic of the Philippines (1965)
- National Science Development Board for Outstanding Publications (1972, 1973)
- UP Alumni Association Professional Award (1973)
- Outstanding Women in Science in the Philippines, UNESCO Biennial Conference (1975)
- Fisheries Research Society Award (1979)
- National Scientist of the Philippines (1983), conferred by Ferdinand Marcos

== Selected publications ==
- Velasquez, Carmen C. (April 1959). "Studies on the Family Bucephalidae Poche 1907 (Trematoda) from Philippine Food Fishes". The Journal of Parasitology. 45 (2): 135–147. doi:10.2307/3286516. JSTOR 3286516.
- Velasquez, Carmen C. (February 1961). "Further Studies on Transversotrema laruei Velasquez with Observations on the Life Cycle (Digenea: Transversotrematidae)". The Journal of Parasitology. 47 (1): 65–70. doi:10.2307/3274980. JSTOR 3274980.
- Velasquez, Carmen C.; Cabrera, Benjamin C. (June 1968). "Ancylostoma ceylanicum (Looss, 1911) in a Filipino Woman". The Journal of Parasitology. 54 (3): 430. doi:10.2307/3277059. JSTOR 3277059.
- Velasquez, Carmen C. (February 1973). "Observations on Some Heterophyidae (Trematoda: Digenea) Encysted in Philippine Fishes". The Journal of Parasitology. 59 (1): 77–84. doi:10.2307/3278575. JSTOR 3278575. PMID 4687513.
- Velasquez, Carmen C. (1975). Digenetic Trematodes of Philippine Fishes. Quezon City: National Research Council of the Philippines. p. 140. ISBN 978-0-8248-0444-2.
