= Prescillano Zamora =

Filipino biologist (1933–2010)

Prescillano M. Zamora (January 4, 1933 – August 3, 2010) was a Filipino biologist who is notable for his work on plant anatomy-morphology and pteridophyte biology. He is also well known for his studies on vascular plants due to which his followers added additional species to some plant's genus'. From 1961 to 1965, he was a member of the Rockefeller Foundation at Cornell University and was also held a grant from the National Science Foundation which he had for three years. From 1977 to 1980, he held a position of a Professorial Chair in the University of the Philippines. A native of San Nicolas, Pangasinan, Zamora completed his undergraduate studies at the University of the Philippines and obtained his graduate degrees from Cornell. He died of a heart attack on August 3, 2010.
