= Zean Cabangis =

Filipino artist

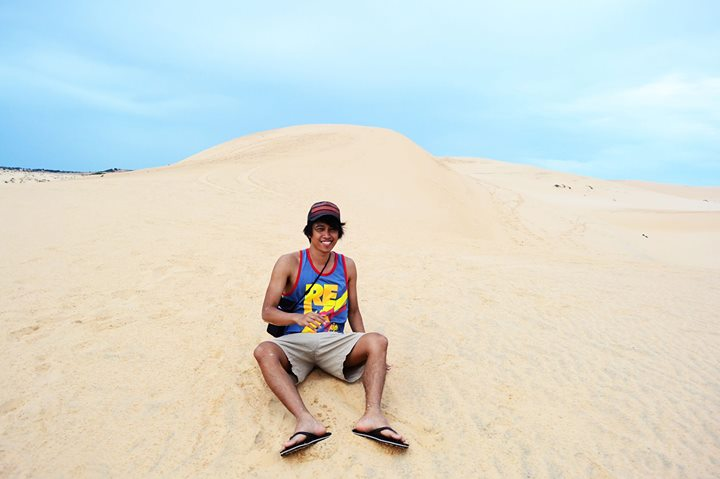
- Self-portrait photograph
- Born: Zean Cabangis; March 8, 1985; Tayabas, Quezon, Philippines
- Known for: Painting

Zean Cabangis is a Filipino visual artist.

== About ==
Zean Cabangis was born on March 8, 1985, to Benjamin Cabangis, a professor at the University of the Philippines, College of Fine Arts and Flora Bajar Cabangis, a Managing Editor at the UP System Information Office, in Tayabas Quezon, but grew up in Quezon City.

He completed his elementary and high school education at the University of the Philippines Integrated School and his college education at the University of the Philippines. Cabangis graduated from UP with a Bachelor of Fine Art with a major in Painting in 2007 and was awarded the Most Outstanding Thesis of 2006.

Cabangis enjoys creating artwork, and his father's being both a painter and art professor were important factors in his choosing to become an artist. He took basic art classes such as electives during his elementary and high school days and attended an art workshop at UP before taking the talent tests of the University of the Philippines.

Cabangis was an Artist-in-Residence with the Southeast Asia Art Group Exchange Program in Tenggara, Yogyakarta, Indonesia in 2011.

== Art ==
Cabangis uses acrylic and emulsion transfer in his works. He learned this technique as a painting student at the University of the Philippines. Instead of painting the images, this technique allowed Cabangis to build layers and reproduce different photographic images. It is through the use of emulsion transfer that the quality Cabangis looks for in his work is achieved.

Hidden beneath the painted lines, his subject consists of everyday objects and scenes which are mostly reconstructed from his memories.

== Recognition ==
Date	Event	Award
	Shell Student's Art Competition	Gawad Chancellor Award for Academic Achievement
2008	Faber Castell Painting Competition	Finalist
2009	Metrobank Art and Design Excellence	Semi-finalist
2012	Ateneo Art Awards	Shortlisted

== Exhibits ==
Cabangis has had five solo shows and several group exhibition in Manila-based galleries and has also exhibited in local and international art fairs.

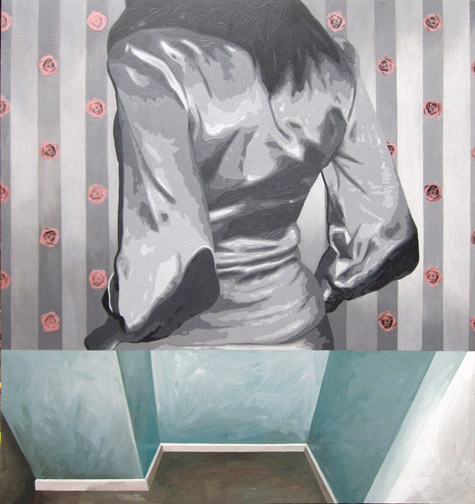
That's What She Said; That, 2011

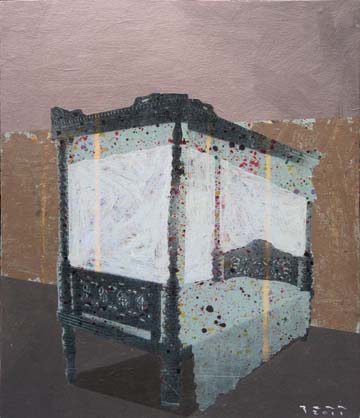
Settle, 2011

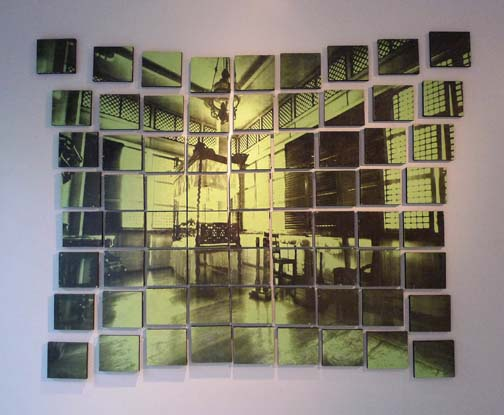
Bedroom, 2011

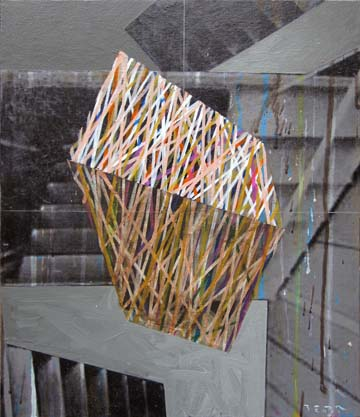
Borderline, 2011

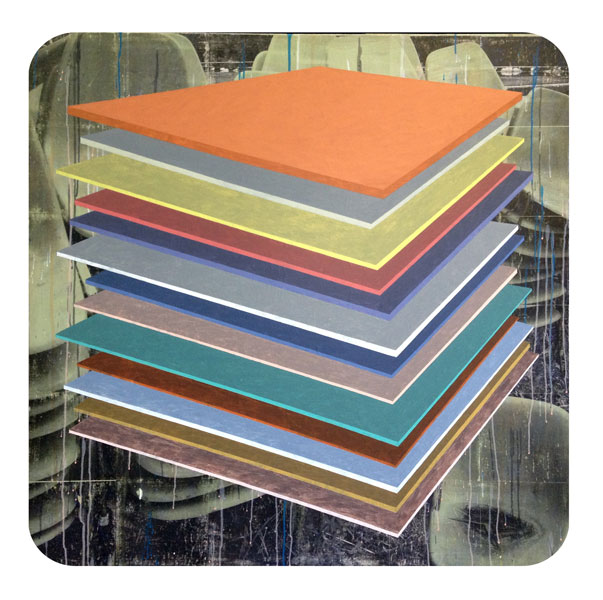
Restacked, 2012

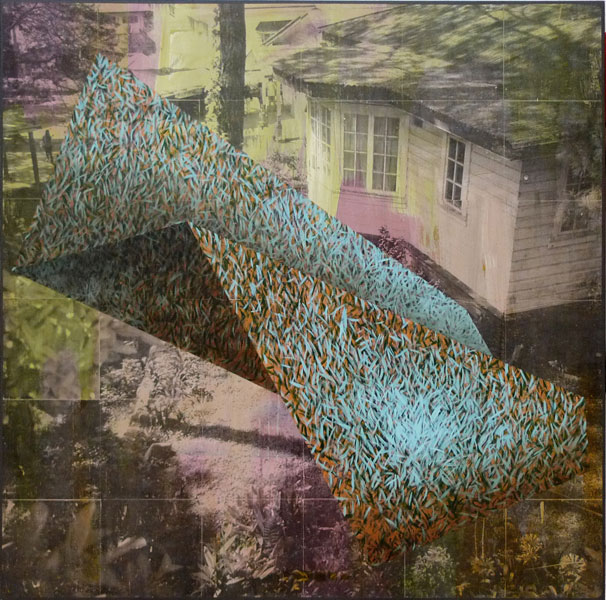
Still Take You Home, 2012

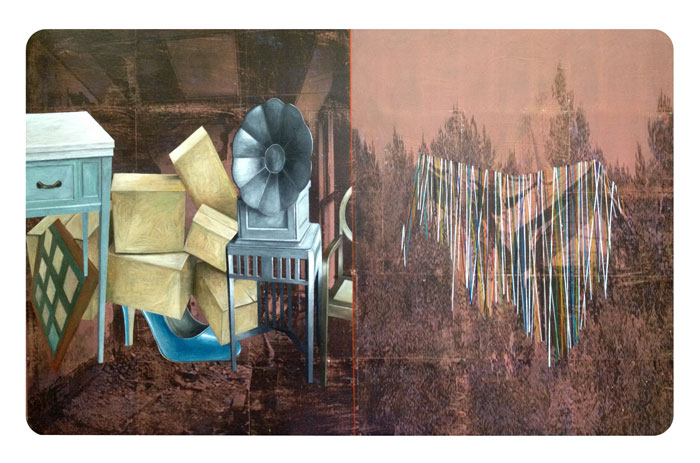
Insatiable, 2012

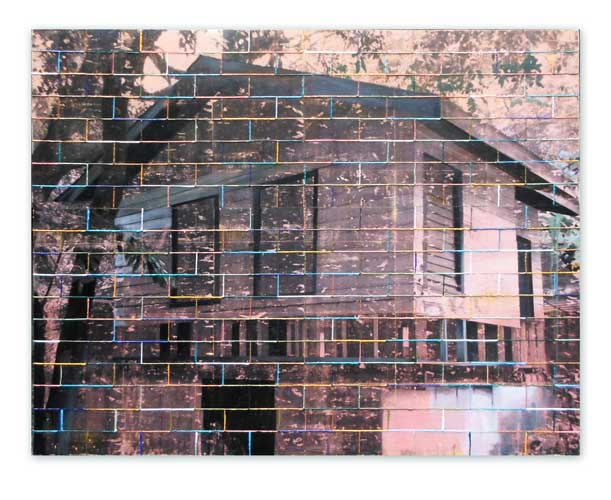
Everything Is Falling Apart, 2013

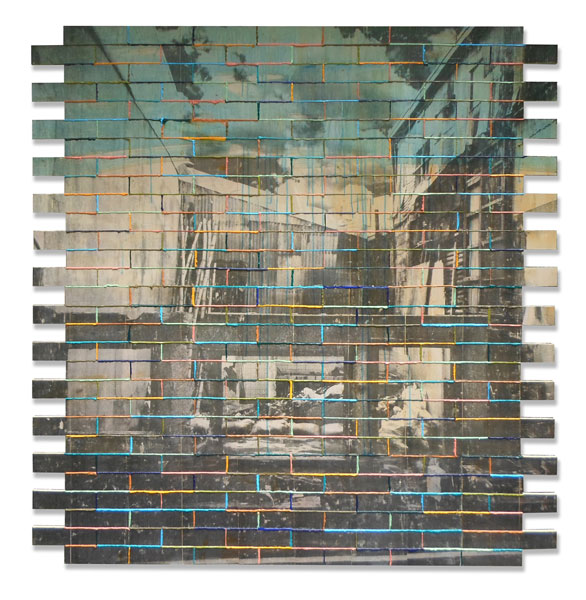
Days Are Gone, 2013

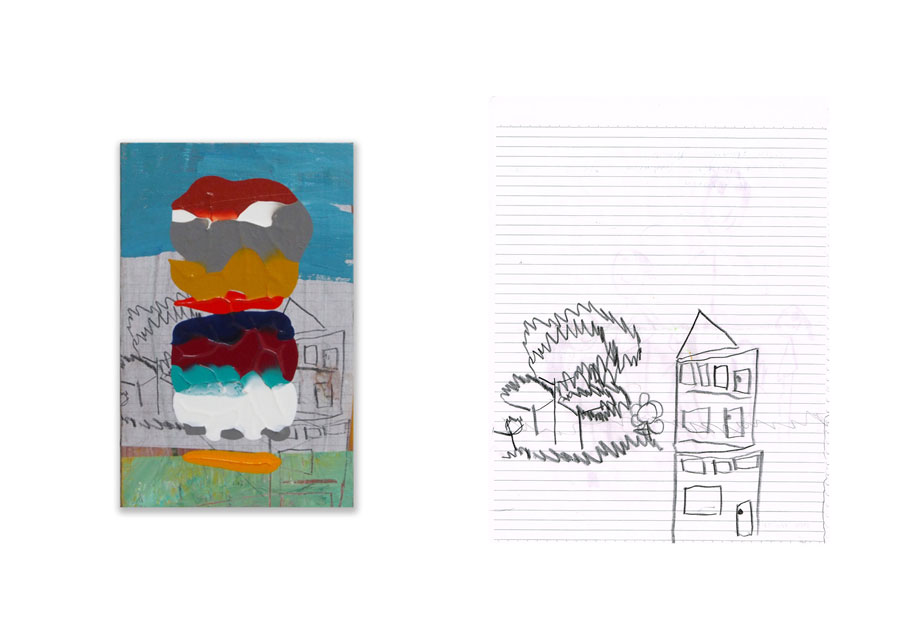
Untitled 2 (Based on the artwork of Sadie Bautista, right), 2013

=== Solo shows ===
Date	Name of Exhibition	Place
2010	whowhatwhenwherehowwhy	Silverlens 20sq Gallery
April 7–25, 2011	Walking On Thin Ice	Art Informal Gallery
2011	Gathering	Now Gallery
November 9–24, 2012	Goat Paths	Art Informal Gallery
September 26 - October 14, 2013	Condestruct	Art Informal Gallery

=== Group exhibits ===
Date	Name of Exhibition	Place
2004	2004 Shell National Student's Art Competition	SM Megamall
2005	2005 Shell National Student's Art Competition	SM Megamall
January 4-February 5, 2012	Shade My Eyes and I Can See You	Silverlens 20sq Gallery

Other group exhibits were held in Salud Bistro Gallery, Blan Gallery, Kaida Gallery, Cubao Expo, Cultural Center of the Philippines, Boston Gallery, The Forth Gallery, Whitebox Studio, and West Gallery in Quezon City. He also exhibited in local places such as Baguio, Makati, Kamuning in Quezon City, and international spots such as Yogyakarta, Indonesia, and Singapore

=== Art fairs ===
Date	Name of Exhibition
January 24–27, 2013	Art Stage 2013(Singapore)
February 7–10, 2013	Art Fair Philippines 2013
March 16, 2013	Art in the Park
October 31, 2013	A Child's Dream Silent Auction
