= Delfin Ganapin Jr. =

Filipino environmentalist

Delfin Ganapin Jr. works for the United Nations in the Global Environment Facility Small Grants Program. He holds the position Global Manager. He heads over 8,000 community projects globally. He guides these projects in over a hundred countries.

== Career ==
Delfin Ganapin started his career leading non-government organizations focused on environmental conservation. He was a founder of the Philippine Federation for Environmental Concern (PFEC), taking numerous risks during the period of martial law in the late 1970s and early 1980s. After his work with the PFEC he went on to work with the Philippine Council for Sustainable Development (PCSD) as a civil society co-chair.
