= Project NOAH (Philippines) =

Disaster risk reduction agency of the University of the Philippines

Project NOAH Nationwide Operational Assessment of Hazards

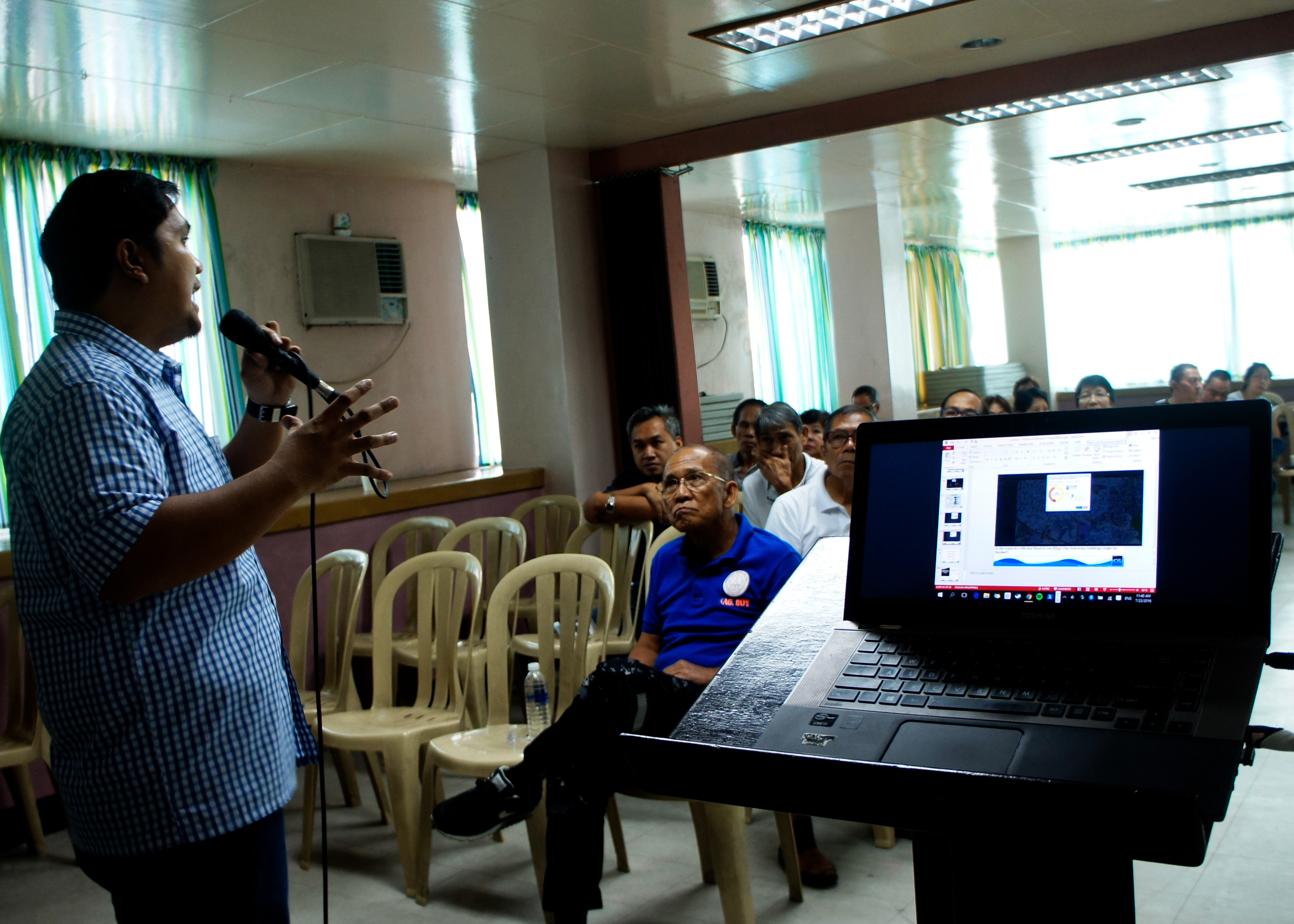
- Project NOAH Integrated Scenario-based Assessment of Impacts and Hazards (ISAIAH) community engagement workshop in 2016

Agency overview
- Formed: July 6, 2012; 14 years ago
- Type: Disaster risk reduction program
- Jurisdiction: Philippines
- Headquarters: Quezon City, Philippines
- Agency executive: Dr. Mahar Lagmay, Executive Director
- Parent Agency: Department of Science and Technology (2012–2017); University of the Philippines (2017–present)
- Website: noah.up.edu.ph noahcenter.up.edu.ph

Project NOAH (Nationwide Operational Assessment of Hazards) is the Philippines' primary disaster risk reduction and management program. Managed by the University of the Philippines, it was initially administered by the Department of Science and Technology (DOST) from 2012 to 2017.

== History and services ==
Project NOAH was a response to President Aquino's call for a better disaster prevention and mitigation system in the Philippines in the aftermath of the destructive Tropical Storm Sendong in December 2011. It was publicly launched by President Aquino, project head Mahar Lagmay, and other government officials in Marikina on July 6, 2012. The program combines science and technology for disaster risk reduction and management. It is also a responsive program that aims to provide a 6-hour lead-time warning to agencies involved in disaster prevention and mitigation. The project also uses advanced technologies to enhance current geo-hazard vulnerability maps. It is also being developed with the help of the National Institute of Geological Sciences and the College of Engineering of the University of the Philippines; the Philippine Atmospheric, Geophysical and Astronomical Services Administration (PAGASA); the Philippine Institute of Volcanology and Seismology (PHIVOLCS); the Advanced Science and Technology Institute (ASTI), and the Science and Technology Information Institute (STII). The project is now composed of twenty-one institutions from the local and private sectors, including media and telecommunication companies.

The program involves eight major components:

- Distribution of Hydrometeorological Devices in hard-hit areas in the Philippines (Hydromet) – the installation of automated rain gauges and water level monitoring stations in major river basins and flood-prone areas.
- Disaster Risk Exposure Assessment for Mitigation – Light Detection and Ranging (DREAM-LIDAR) Project – the development of accurate three-dimensional flood inundation and hazard maps for the country's flood-prone areas.
- Enhancing Geohazards Mapping through LIDAR– the use of LIDAR technology and computer-assisted analyses to identify landslide-prone areas.
- Coastal Hazards and Storm Surge Assessment and Mitigation (CHASSAM) – to generate wave surge, wave refraction, and coastal circulation models to understand and recommend solutions for coastal erosion.
- Flood Information Network (FloodNET) Project – the building of a flood center to provide timely and accurate information for flood forecasts.
- Local Development of Doppler Radar Systems (LaDDeRS) – to develop local capacity to operate Doppler weather radar systems.
- Landslide Sensors Development Project – a low-cost, locally developed, sensor-based early monitoring and warning system for landslides, slope failures, and debris flow.
- Weather Hazard Information Project (WHIP) – the use of television and a web portal to display real-time weather data to help local governments and communities to prepare against natural hazards.

The program has been dubbed as the country's flagship disaster prevention and mitigation program.

In January 2017, the Philippine government announced that Project NOAH would transition out of its DOST phase effective 1 March, citing that its scheduled term concluded on February 28, 2017. On February 23, 2017, the University of the Philippines decided to adopt Project NOAH and continue its operations upon the termination of its administration by the Department of Science and Technology (DOST) on February 28.

The last component completed before the end of its DOST-administered era was the Integrated Scenario-based Assessment of Impacts and Hazards (ISAIAH), which sought to translate hazards mapped by the project into municipal-level risk assessments that detail the level of exposure and vulnerability of a community. The component allowed citizens to contribute ground-level risk information through the use of OpenStreetMap. The component resulted to completion of 16 provinces mapped with 2.2 million structures added to the database.

On June 20, 2017, the University of the Philippines relaunched the UP Resilience Institute with Project NOAH, now called NOAH Center, as its flagship program.

== Mobile application ==
Project NOAH
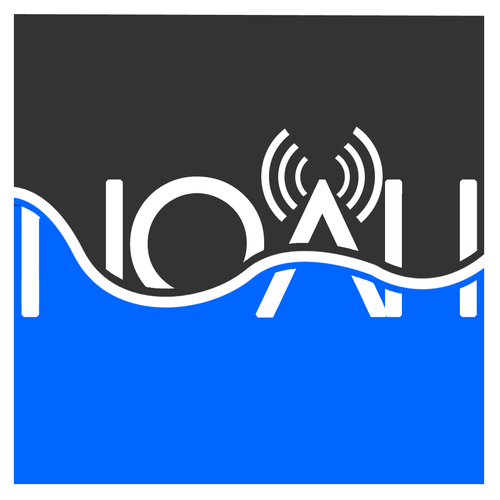
- Developer: Department of Science and Technology
- Release: 17 October 2012; 13 years ago

Final release(s)
- Android: 1.2.8 / July 25, 2017; 9 years ago
- iOS: 1.0.3 / August 15, 2017; 8 years ago
- Operating system: Android, iOS
- Size: 1.8 MB (Android); 17.6 MB (iOS)
- Website: www.noah.up.edu.ph

The official mobile version of project NOAH was launched by then-DOST Secretary Mario Montejo and Smart Communications on 17 October 2012. The app was developed by Rolly Rulete together with Pablito Veroy and Jay Albano. The mobile application prototype was originally written in HTML5.

== Awards ==
=== International ===
- ARKO, another mobile app under Project NOAH received the UN World Summit Awards Mobile Content under the e-Inclusion and Empowerment category in 2014. The award is a first for the Philippines, as ARKO bested 450 other international mobile applications. The nominees are selected based on how information technology is applied to empower social groups.
- In 2016, International Data Corporation Asia Pacific named Project NOAH as the Top Smart City Initiative in Public Safety at the Smart City Asia Pacific Awards (SCAPA) 2016.
- After being one of the five finalists in May 2016, Project NOAH takes home the Harnessing Data for Resilience Recognition Award from the Harnessing the Data Revolution for Resilience Summit in Bangkok, Thailand sponsored by USAID.
- ARKO, the mobile application by Pointwest Technologies Corporation, added another feather to its cap after it took home the Silver Prize in the Corporate Social Responsibility category of the 2015 ASEAN ICT Awards. The event was held last 26 November 2015 at the Convention Center of Furuma Resort of Da Nang, Vietnam, and graced by the different ministers of ASEAN countries who attended the closing ceremony of the 15th ASEAN Telecommunications and IT Ministers and Related Meetings in Vietnam.
- The Department of Science and Technology's (DOST) 3D mapping project called Disaster Risk Assessment, Exposure and Mitigation-Light Ranging and Detection Technology (DREAM-LiDAR) won the prestigious Geospatial World Excellence in Policy Implementation Award for 2014. A component of the Project NOAH, the DREAM-LiDAR addresses and helps mitigate the effects of flooding disasters in the country.
- DREAM-LiDAR also won the Asia Geospatial Excellence Award during the Inaugural Ceremony of the Asia Geospatial Forum 2013 held in Jakarta, Indonesia last November 25, 2013.

=== Local ===
- On March 24, 2015, Arko also became the first winner of the Best Philippine-made Mobile Application of the Year in the 2015 International ICT Awards Manila. Organized by the Canadian Chamber of Commerce of the Philippines (CanCham) and the Information Technology and Business Process Association of the Philippines (IBPAP), the prestigious annual event aims to recognize achievements in the country's fast-growing IT-BPM industry.
- Project NOAH was given a Special Award during the University of the Philippines' Recognition Ceremony for Extension programs held at the Malcolm Auditorium, UP College of Law on 17 May 2016. This was given in acknowledgement of Project NOAH's continuous contribution of knowledge through its research towards improving the Philippine Public's safety against the hazards brought about by typhoons; namely Flooding, Landslides and Storm Surges.
- NOAH was also one of the 5 institutions that received the 2015 Gawad Parangal Awards as Quezon City continued its tradition of honoring outstanding individuals and institutions that have made achievements that inspire and exert a positive impact on society.
- For making public information on weather conditions and disaster information available to the public, the NOAH mobile application won the Best Mobile App at the FutureGov Awards 2013, held in the New World Hotel, Makati last April 11, 2013. FutureGov was a magazine for government, healthcare, and education.
- The NOAH Android mobile app was also awarded the Best Telecom Project in the 16th Telecom Asia Awards, the region's longest-running and most prestigious telecom industry awards program that recognizes innovative and outstanding performance by Asian service providers and industry executives. The award was given last April 17, 2013 in Kuala Lumpur, and was received by SMART Communications Inc., who helped develop Project NOAH's mobile application for Android through the Smart Developer Network (SMART DevNet).
- The importance of Project NOAH's mobile app was again cited in the recent 48th Anvil Awards, an award-giving body for outstanding Public Relations programs and tools in the Philippines. Developed by SMART Communications Inc. and Davao-based developer Rolly Rulete, the NOAH mobile app for Android won the Anvil Award of Excellence in March 2013.
- In the 2012 CyberPress Awards, NOAH took home the “IT Product of the Year” award for paving the way toward a more responsive and innovative use of technology in providing weather information crucial for disaster response activities. The Cyberpress Awards is an annual fete that recognizes the best of the best in local IT for the year.
- Digital Heroes Awards, DOST Project NOAH was recognized during the first-ever Media Digital Heroes Awards in August 2012 as one of the key organizations that effectively leveraged social media to organize, lead, and galvanize rescue and relief operations during the then recent week-long monsoon-caused floods.
