= Jeeca Uy =

Filipina author

- Born: Jessica Uy; 1997 or 1998 (age 27–28); Philippines
- Education: University of the Philippines Diliman (Visual Communications)
- Occupations: Cookbook author and vegan blogger
- Writing career
- Subject: Vegan/Plant-based cookbooks
- Website: thefoodietakesflight.com

Jeeca Uy (born 1997 or 1998) is a Filipina vegan/plant-based cookbook author who blogs under the name The Foodie Takes Flight.

== Early life ==
Jessica Uy was born between 1997 and 1998 and raised in the Philippines, where she was called Jeeca which she notes is "short for Jessica." She refers to herself as Chinese-Filipino. She first turned to vegan cooking after watching the film Earthlings in 2015, right after graduating from high school. She initially faced challenges because she was living in the Philippines and "Filipino food isn’t vegan-friendly." She taught herself how to veganize her favorite dishes, which she documents through social media.

Uy received her degree in Visual Communications from the University of the Philippines Diliman.

== Career ==
A few outlets have recognized Uy's first cookbook Vegan Asian: A Cookbook: The Best Dishes from Thailand, Japan, China and More Made Simple. PETA named it one of the "Vegan Cookbooks That Will Help Make 2021 Way Better Than Last Year" in 2021, Prevention called it one of the "10 Best Vegan Cookbooks for Dabbling in Plant-Based Cooking" in 2022, and VegNews listed it as one of the "Top 100 Vegan Cookbooks of All Time" in 2024.

In 2023, Gotham named Uy as one of the "9 Best Vegan Food Influencers To Follow."

== Awards ==
Uy is the recipient of the 2023 Gen.T (Philippines) Award from Tatler Asia, "for highlighting Asia’s plant-based culinary heritage."

== Books ==
- Vegan Asian: A Cookbook: The Best Dishes from Thailand, Japan, China and More Made Simple. Page Street, 2021. ISBN 978-1645672807.
