= Jose Mario De Vega =

Filipino author and academic (born 1976)

Jose Mario Dolor De Vega
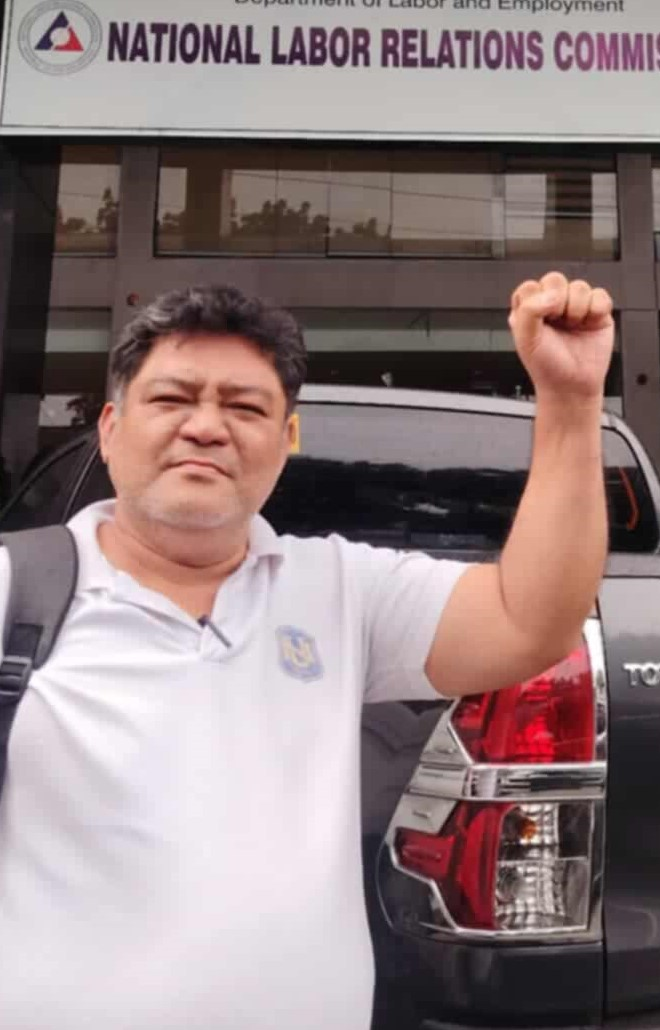
- De Vega at the Philippine National Labor Relations Commission (NLRC) in 2025
- Born: October 14, 1976 (age 50); Quezon City, Philippines
- Occupations: Lecturer, book author
- Known for: Political philosophy

Academic background
- Education: University of the Philippines Diliman

Academic work
- Discipline: Law, philosophy, Philippine studies, political science
- Website: https://up-diliman.academia.edu/JoseMarioDeVega

Jose Mario Dolor De Vega is a Filipino author and academic. He has lectured at National University, Polytechnic University of the Philippines, Universidad de Manila, Adamson University, De La Salle University – Dasmariñas, Far Eastern University, Trinity University of Asia, among other Philippine higher education institutions. Outside the country, he taught philosophy, ethics, and anthropology at Nilai University in Negeri Sembilan, Malaysia.

De Vega has been interviewed in various media outlets and written books, academic journal articles, and Op-Ed pieces tackling philosophy, politics, and wars, while attending graduate studies at the University of the Philippines Diliman.

== Early life ==
De Vega was born in the Philippines.

He graduated with a Bachelor of Arts in Political Science from Olivarez College, a Bachelor of Laws from the Philippine Law School, and a Master of Arts in Philosophy from the University of the Philippines Diliman.

== Major publications ==
Some of the latest writings of De Vega are as follows:

=== Books ===
- Dissidente [Central Book Supply Inc., 2013], ISBN 978-971-011-677-5
- Insurrecto [Central Book Supply Inc., 2017]
- Pantayong Pananaw at Paninindigang Pulitikal (2021), Reyes & Campomanes, eds., ISBN 978-971-91975-9-1
- (Pravda) Ang Digmaang Proxy sa Ukraina: Rusya Laban sa NATO (2022), ISBN 978-621-06-0026-1
- Kontra Imperyalismo at Henosidyo: Ang Palestina sa Kuko ng Zionismo at Neokolonyalismo (2024), ISBN 978-621-06-1257-8

=== Journal articles ===
- From Selfhood to Social Solidarity; From a Mind towards the Collective Thinking and Working Bodies: A Marxist Approach In Scientia: The International Journal on the Liberal Arts, 2022, 11(1)
- Migrante: We are the Nameless Dead (Diliman Review, 2023), 67(1)

=== Op-ed ===
- "Light and justice vs darkness and tyranny," Philippine Daily Inquirer (April 17, 2025)
- "Negative impact of Syria’s regime change," Philippine Daily Inquirer (December 13, 2024)
- "[OPINION] The Maharlika fund is a family bill against the general welfare of Filipinos," Rappler (December 11, 2022)

== Other activity ==
De Vega is an advocate for workers' and teachers' rights.
