= Mahar Lagmay =

Filipino geologist

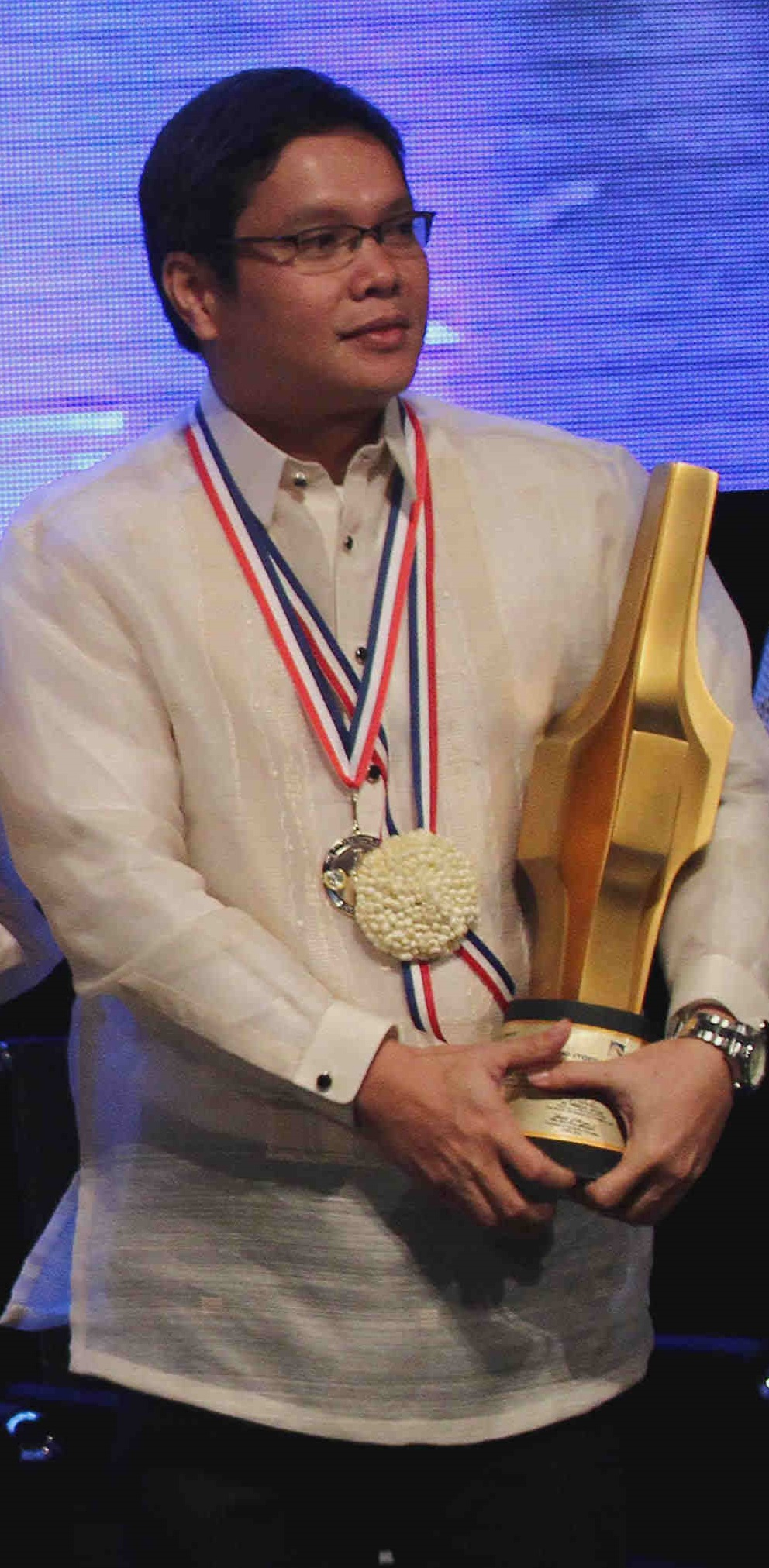
- Lagmay during the awarding ceremony of The Outstanding Filipino (TOFIL) in 2013.
- Born: Alfredo Mahar Francisco Amante Lagmay; October 4, 1966 (age 60)
- Education: University of the Philippines Diliman (BSc, 1987; MSc, 1993); University of Cambridge (PhD, 2001)
- Known for: Project NOAH
- Awards: European Geosciences Union Plinius Medal (2015); The Outstanding Filipino Award (2014)
- Scientific career
- Fields: Geology
- Workplaces: University of the Philippines Diliman
- Thesis: Studies on explosive eruptions and emplacement of pyroclastic flows (2001)
- Doctoral advisor: David Pyle

Alfredo Mahar Francisco Amante Lagmay (born October 4, 1966) is a Filipino geologist. He is executive director of Project NOAH (Nationwide Operational Assessment of Hazards) and a professor at the National Institute of Geological Sciences of the University of the Philippines Diliman.

== Education and career ==
Lagmay earned his B.Sc. in geology in 1987 and M.Sc. in 1993 from the University of the Philippines Diliman. He earned his PhD in geology from the University of Cambridge in 2001. He also became a visiting scientist at the Geophysics Department of Stanford University and National Autonomous University of Mexico. He is currently a faculty member of the National Institute of Geological Sciences of the University of the Philippines Diliman. Upon returning to the university as a professor, his research interest focused on volcanic behavior and implications for human activities.

His expertise on disaster mitigation allowed him to lead DOST's Project NOAH as executive director in 2012; Project NOAH has been described as the country's leading disaster prevention and mitigation program.

Lagmay has published detailed analyses of major disasters in the Philippines such as the Guinsaugon landslide; Mayon eruptions; typhoons Ondoy, Sendong, Pablo, and Yolanda; and storm surges. He was part of the Philippine panel on the Philippine claim to Benham Rise in the United Nations Commission on the Law of the Sea.

In 2013, Lagmay was awarded the Outstanding Filipino for Geology and Earth Science, and was awarded as "WikiPinoy of the Year" by WikiPilipinas in 2014 for “empowering the public with open information and insight into the significant issues affecting the country today.” Lagmay was awarded the Plinius Medal by the European Geosciences Union on 15 April 2015, in Vienna, Austria, for his "outstanding interdisciplinary natural-hazard research and natural-disaster engagement in the Philippines, particularly with respect to volcanic hazards, earthquakes, typhoons, landslides and floods." He is the first Asian to receive the award.

Lagmay was also a radio personality. He co-hosted RED Alert on DZMM with reporters Atom Araullo and Ted Esguerra. The radio program was recognized in the 9th Hildegarde Awards of St. Scholastica College in 2015, the Communication Management Award of Merit for the Multi-Audience Communication category by the Philippine Quill Awards for 2014 and the 2014 Catholic Mass Media Award (CMMA) for best educational radio program.

Lagmay has been a consultant to the World Bank and a member of the Philippine-American Academy of Science and Engineering.

== Personal life ==
Lagmay is the youngest son of Alfredo Lagmay, national scientist for experimental psychology and Professor Emeritus of Psychology at the University of the Philippines Diliman.

== Awards and recognition ==
- Presidential Citation for Search and Rescue Work in Guinsaugon
- Outstanding Research Award for advanced science and technology in the Philippines for innovative applications of space technology, 2008
- University of the Philippines Scientist awards, 2008 and 2011
- New Media Digital Heroes Award, 2012
- Cyberpress Best IT Product of the Year for development of the Project NOAH website and mobile tools, 2012
- Professional Regulation Commission Outstanding Professional of the Year in Geology, 2013
- The Outstanding Filipino (TOFIL) Award for Geology and Earth Science by the Junior Chamber International and the Senate of the Philippines, 2013
- WikiPinoy of the Year by WikiPilipinas and Vibal Foundation, 2014
- Distinguished Alumni Award in Disaster Mitigation by the University of the Philippines Alumni Association, 2014
- Plinius Medal by the European Geosciences Union, 2015
- Gawad sa Kaunlaran
- Asian Scientist 100, Asian Scientist, 2016
