= National Science Complex =

University science park in Quezon City, Philippines

Coordinates: 14°38′59″N 121°4′18″E

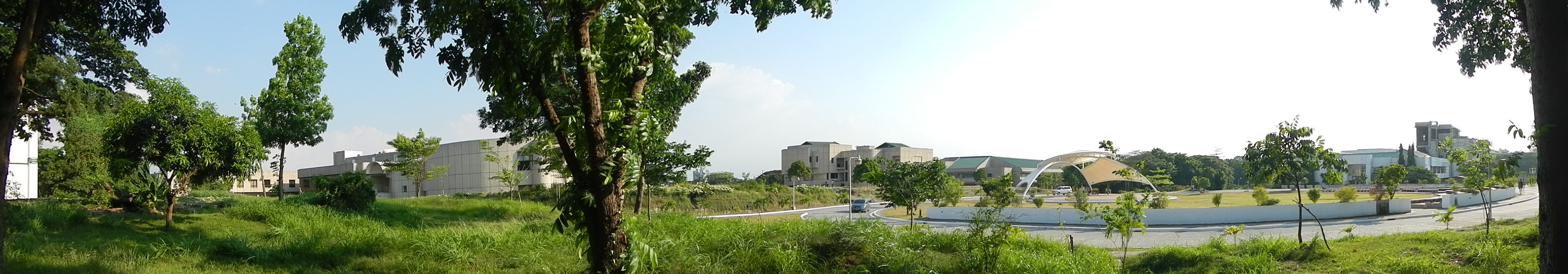
National Science Complex Amphitheater (UP Diliman).

The National Science Complex (NSC) is a purpose-built collection of buildings where several research and academic institutes of the University of Philippines Diliman (UPD) are located, including the Marine Science Institute (MSI), the National Institute of Geological Sciences (NIGS), the National Institute of Physics (NIP), the National Institute of Molecular Biology and Biotechnology–Diliman (NIMBB-Diliman), and the National Institute for Science and Mathematics Education Development (NISMED).

The complex is on 21.9 hectares (54 acres) on the UPD's main campus in Diliman, Quezon City, Metro Manila, Philippines.

The University of the Philippines College of Science operates the NSC.

The National Science Complex was created by President Gloria Macapagal Arroyo through executive order EO 583.

== Gallery ==
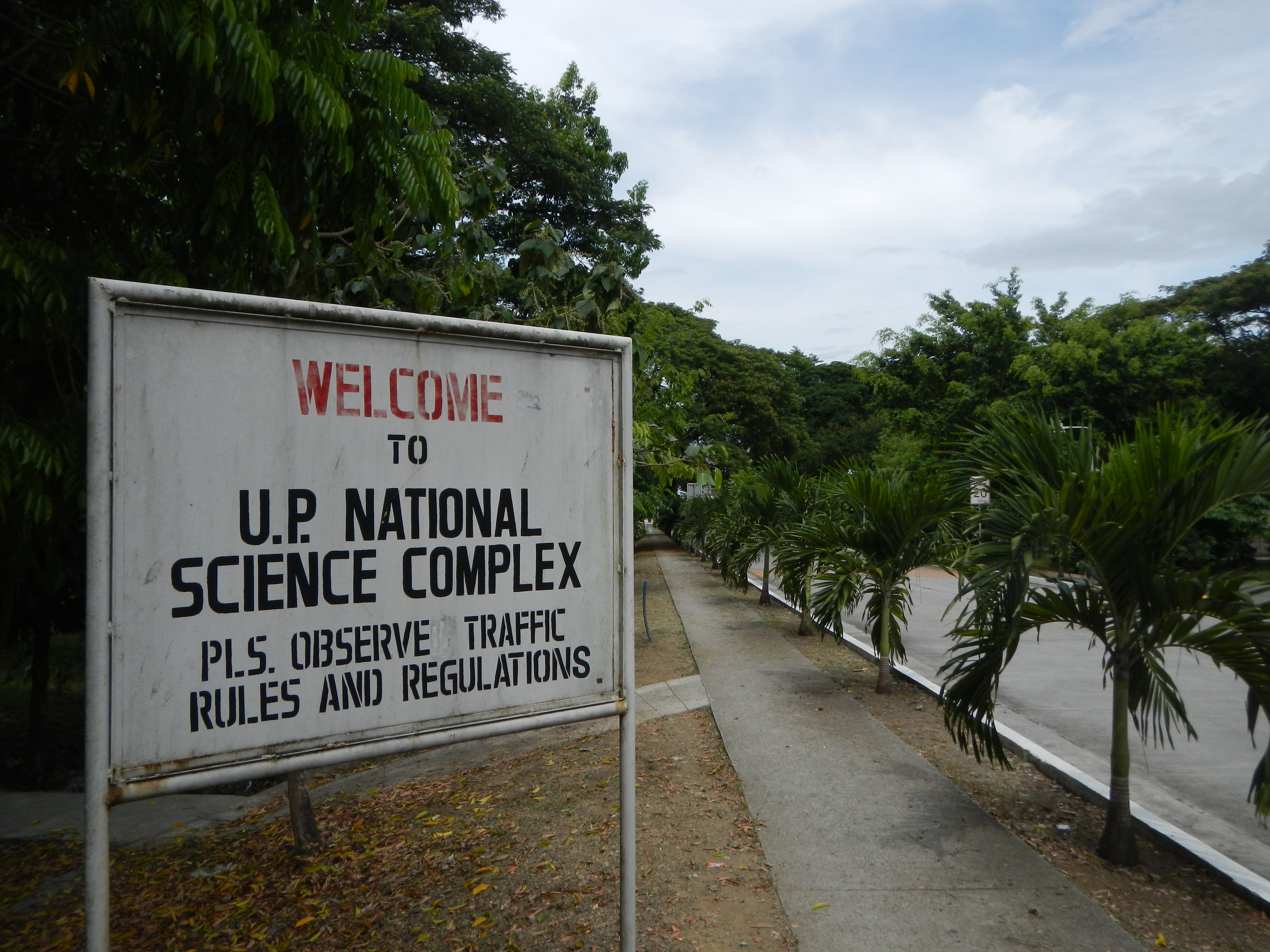
Welcome sign

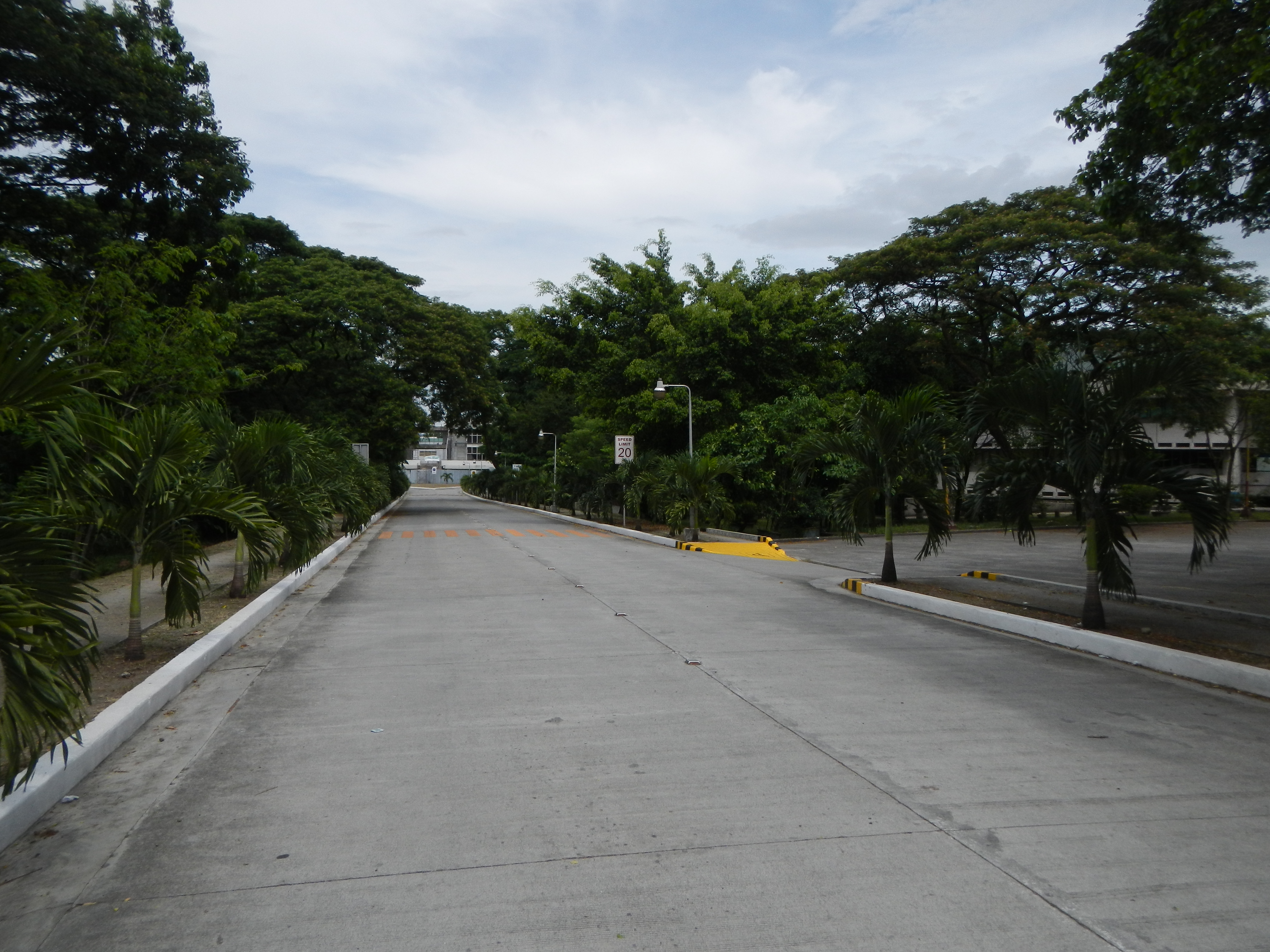
Entrance road leading to the administration building

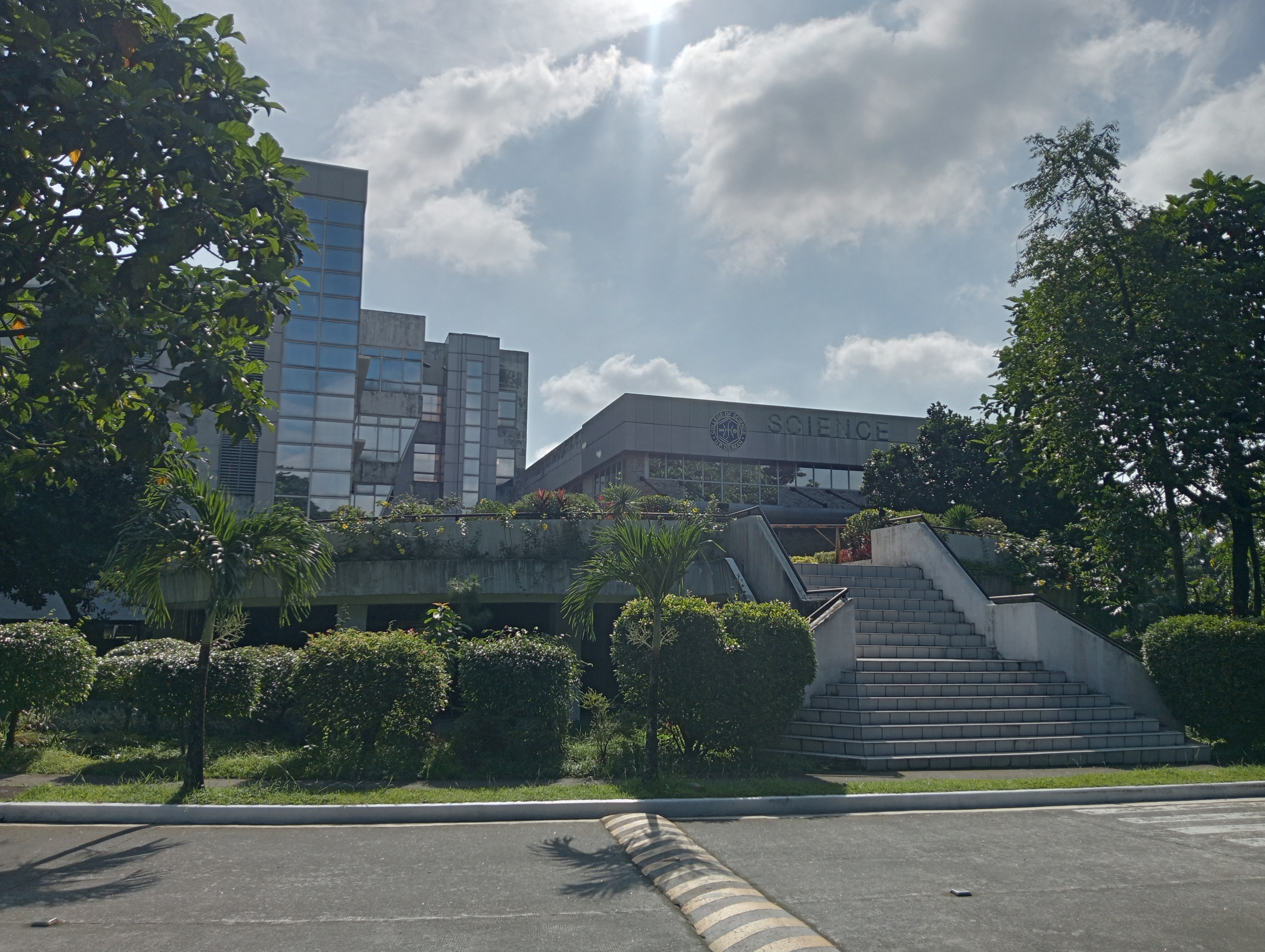
Administration building

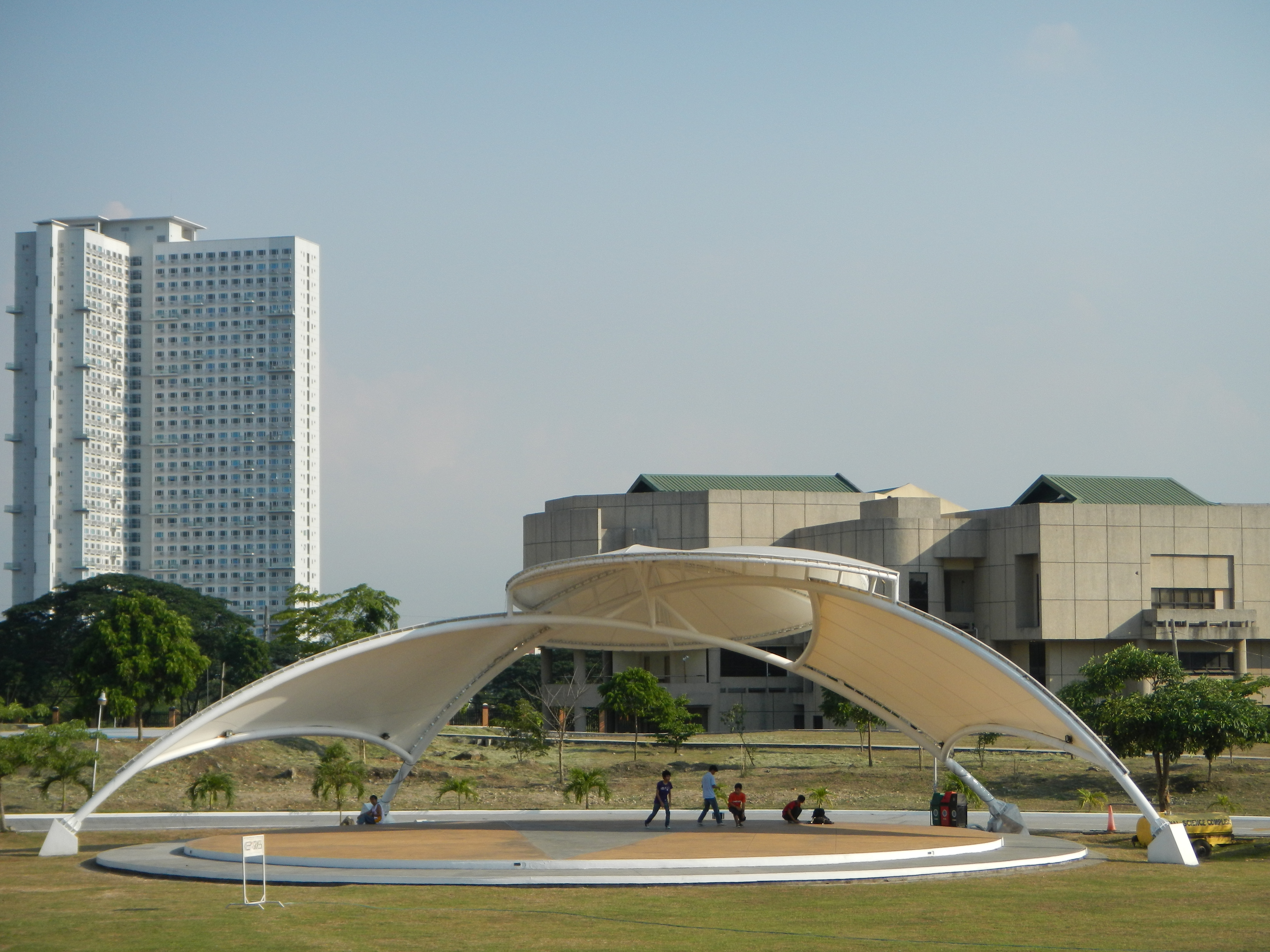
NSC amphitheater

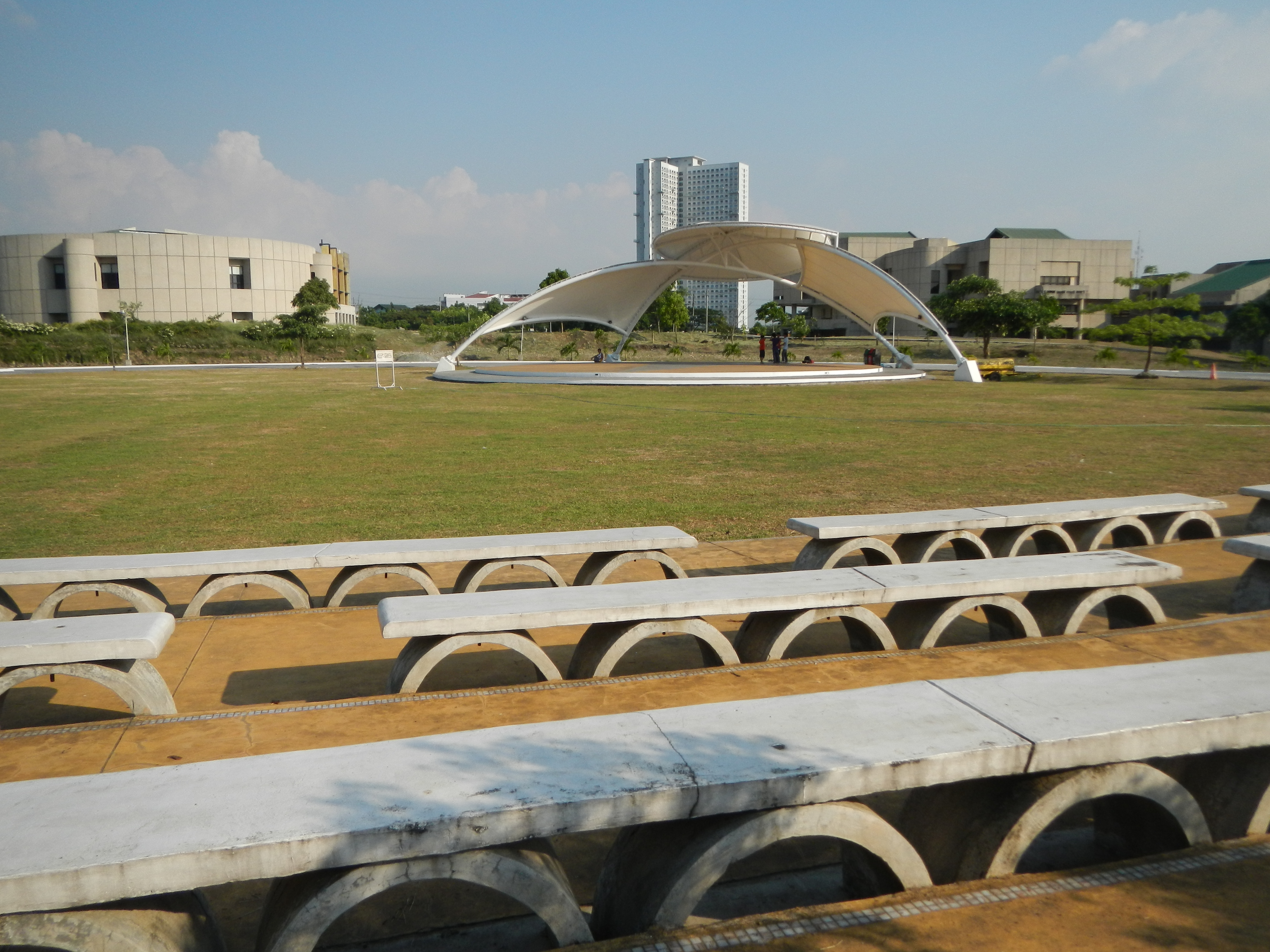
Amphitheater seats, with the National Institute of Physics (NIP, background left) and the Institute of Mathematics (IMath, background right)

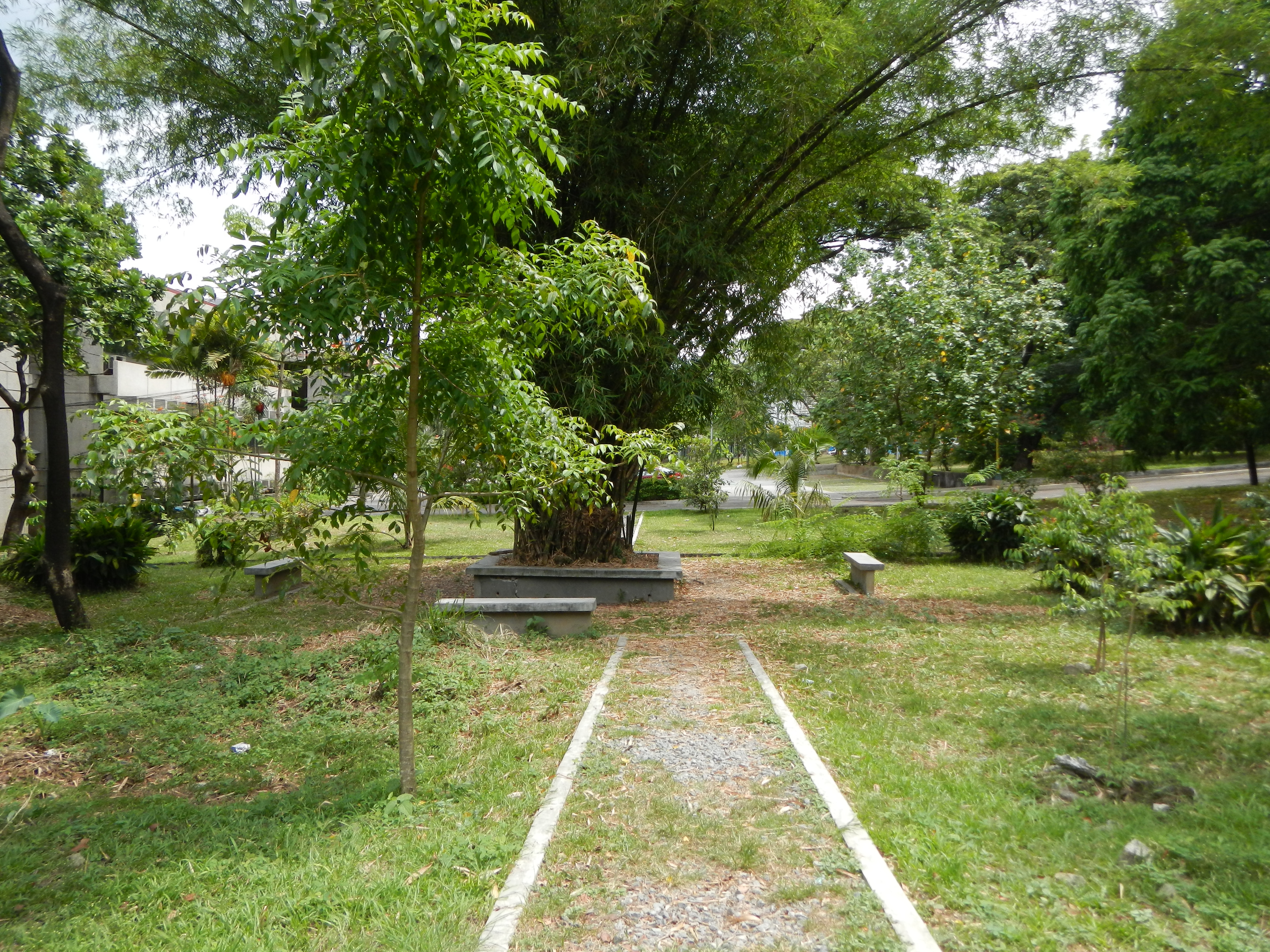
Pedestrian pathway next to the Marine Science Institute

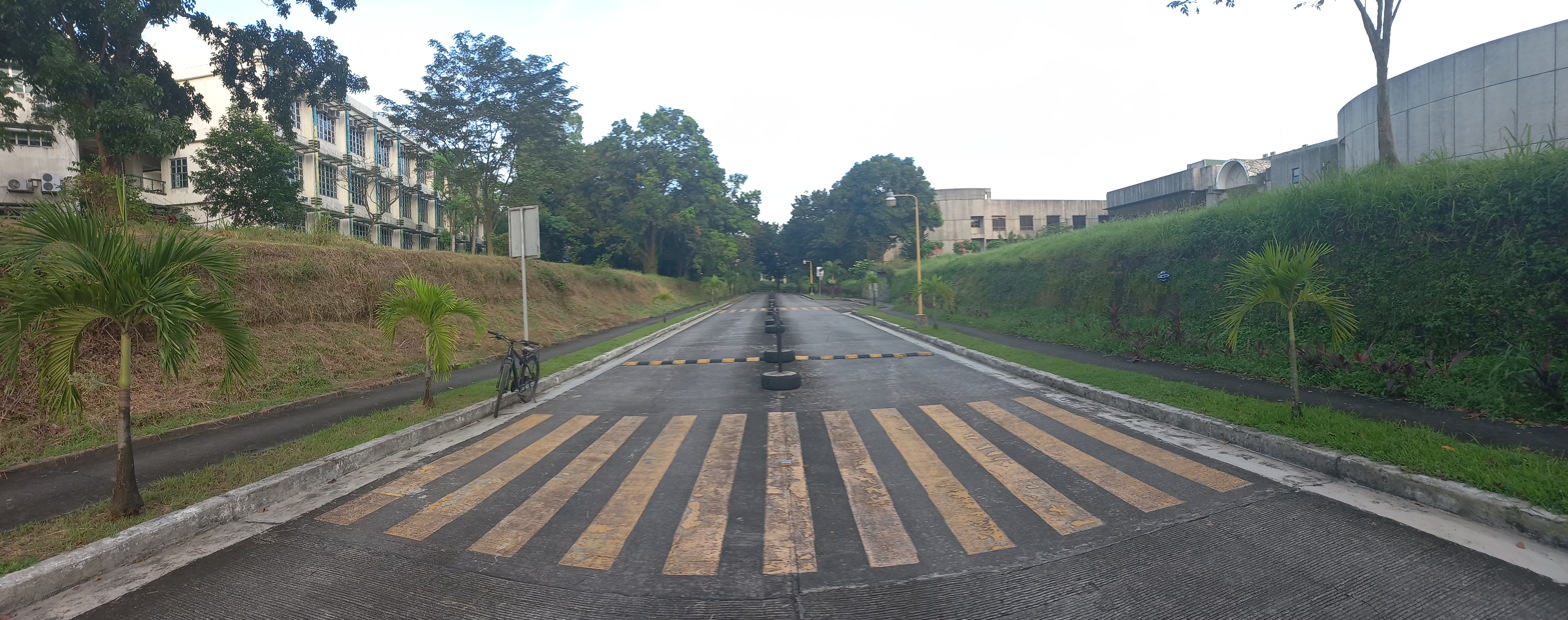
Road between the Institute of Chemistry (IC) and National Institute of Physics
