= Caesar Saloma =

Filipino academic (born 1960)

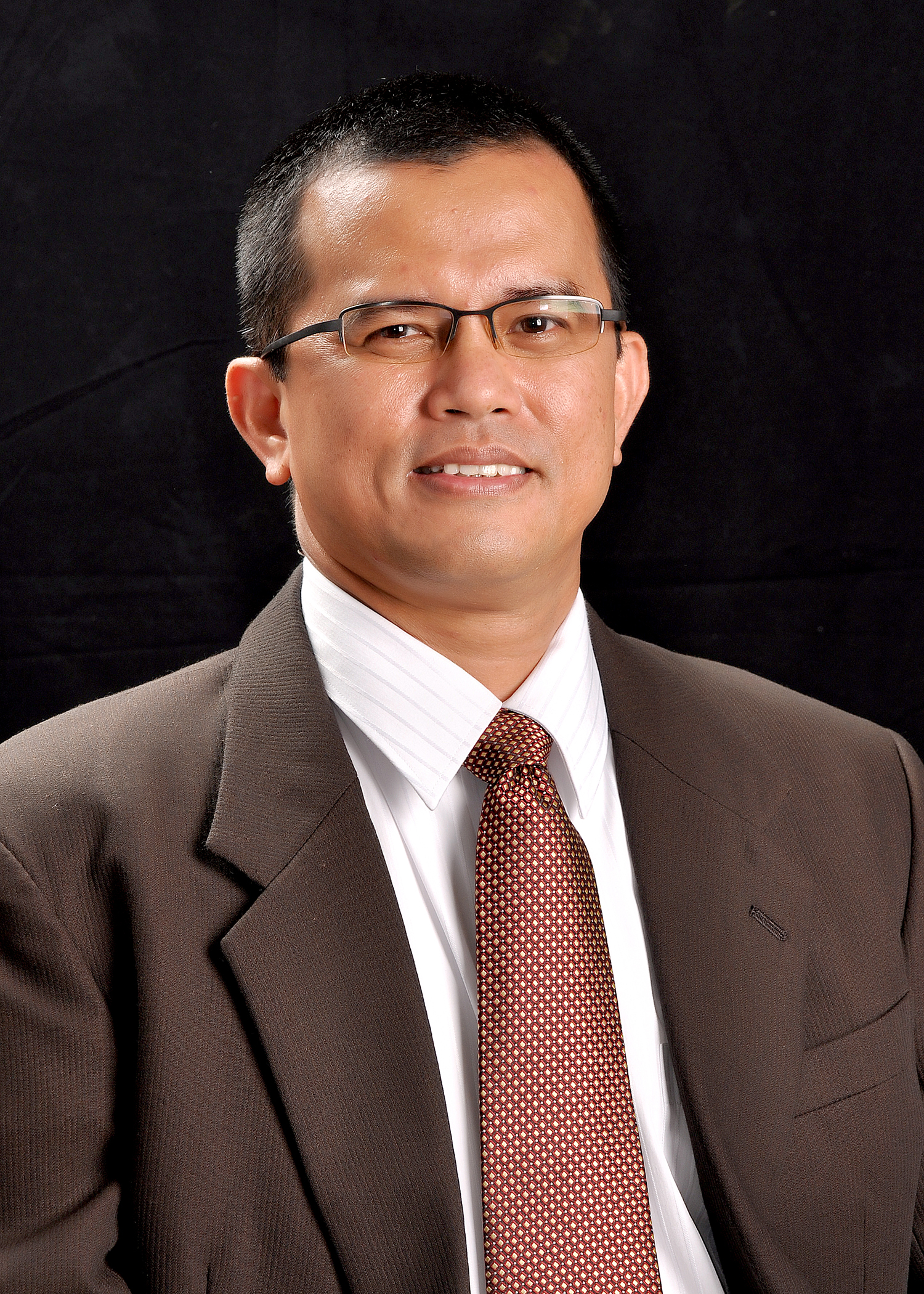
- Chancellor Saloma

9th chancellor of the University of the Philippines Diliman
- In office 2 March 2011 – 1 March 2014
- President: Alfredo E. Pascual
- Preceded by: Dr. Sergio Cao
- Succeeded by: Dr. Michael L. Tan

Dean of the University of the Philippines College of Science
- In office June 2006 – March 2011
- Preceded by: Dr. Rhodora Azanza
- Succeeded by: Dr. Jose Ma. Balmaceda

Personal details
- Born: March 28, 1960 (age 66) Baclayon, Bohol, Philippines
- Education: University of the Philippines Diliman
- Profession: Physicist, Educator
- Website: http://www.nip.upd.edu.ph/ipl

Caesar Aya-ay Saloma (born March 28, 1960) is a Filipino academic who is a professor of the National Institute of Physics (NIP) at the University of the Philippines College of Science and a member of the National Academy of Science and Technology.

He previously served as Chancellor of the University of the Philippines Diliman (March 2011- February 2014), Dean of the College of Science (June 2006 - March 2011) and Director of NIP (June 2000 - May 2006).

== Education ==
Saloma obtained his BS, MS, and PhD degrees from the University of the Philippines Diliman in 1981, 1984, and 1989, respectively. As a Monbukagakusho scholar, he started working in optics in October 1987. His dissertation on speckle reduction in laser microscopy was supervised by Shigeo Minami and Satoshi Kawata of Osaka University.

He spent his childhood in Baclayon, Bohol and attended high school at the Immaculate Heart of Mary Seminary in nearby Tagbilaran City. He is included in the Marquis Who's Who in Science and Engineering 2016-2017 (12th Edition) and in the Ultimate List of 15 Asian Scientists To Watch that was published by Asian Scientist on 15 May 2011.

== Profile ==
In 2004 Saloma received the Galileo Galilei Award from the International Commission for Optics in recognition of his significant contributions in the field of optics that were accomplished under comparatively unfavorable conditions. He is the first scientist from an ASEAN member country to receive the Galileo Award.

In 2006, the UP Board of Regents appointed him along with two others, to the highest rank of Scientist III in the UP Scientific Productivity System which was first implemented in the said year. His three-year appointment was renewed in 2009, 2012 and 2015, respectively. He is the only UP faculty member who has been appointed to the rank of Scientist III for four consecutive terms.

In 2008, he received the triennial ASEAN Outstanding Scientist and Technologist Award from the ASEAN Committee on Science and Technology during the 8th ASEAN Science and Technology Week in Manila, Philippines. Saloma was recognized for his contributions to photonics and signal processing that were accomplished with colleagues and students at the National Institute of Physics.

Saloma led the development of a method to generate high-contrast images of semiconductor sites via one photon optical beam-induced current imaging and confocal reflectance microscopy. The project received a US patent (No. 7,235,988) on 26 June 2007. He has published more than 100 papers in leading photonics, applied physics and multidisciplinary journals in the US and Europe. His efforts resulted in the development of novel and cost-effective / non-invasive method techniques in optical signal recovery, retrieval and identifying microscopic defects in integrated circuits (IC) enabling the accurate identification of circuit defects by producing a high-contrast image map that distinguishes semiconductor, metal and dielectric sites from each other. The pioneering work of his team on the use of the hydrogen Raman shifter as a light source for two-color two-photon excitation microscopy was also awarded a US patent (No. 8,227,256 B2) on 24 July 2012.

His fields of interest include confocal laser scanning microscopy, interferometry, signal and image processing, neural networks, and complex adaptive systems. Aside from developing new optical microscopy techniques, Saloma is also engaged in the development of efficient models for describing the dynamics of real-world systems that involve a large number of interacting agents.

Saloma was elected to the National Academy of Science and Technology (NAST) in July 2005. The NAST is the highest recognition body of the Philippine government on science and technology. It provides advice to the Philippine President and the Cabinet on matters related to science and technology

He is a recipient of other awards and recognition including the NAST Outstanding Young Scientist (Applied Physics) in 1992, the NAST-Third World Academy of Science (TWAS) Prize in Physics in 1997, and the Gawad Chanselor para sa Natatanging Guro (Outstanding Teacher) in 2006 and several Gawad Chanselor para sa Pinakamahusay na Mananaliksik (Best Researcher in S&T) from the University of the Philippines Diliman. Saloma also received from the Metrobank Foundation the 2007 Outstanding Teacher Award on September 7, 2007, and the Award for Continuing Excellence and Service (ACES) on January 29, 2014.

Saloma was awarded by the Department of Science and Technology, Philippines (DOST) with the 1999 Outstanding R&D Award in Basic Research (Eduardo Quisumbing Medal) for his work (with F. Domingo) on image compression of video and confocal images [Applied Optics 38, pp. 3735–3744 (1999)]. He was included in the "50 Men and Women of Science" list that was released by the DOST for its 50th anniversary celebration as a government department in June 2008.

He received the Lingkod Bayan Award - the Presidential Award for Outstanding Public Service, from Philippine president Gloria Macapagal Arroyo in a ceremony held at the Malacanang Palace on 19 September 2008. The award is the highest recognition given to a Philippine government employee for outstanding work performance.

He was elected Inaugural Fellow of the Samahang Pisika ng Pilipinas (Physics Society of the Philippines) on 23 October 2008 during the 26th SPP Physics Congress in Baguio City.

Saloma received the 2010 Outstanding Science Administrator Award (Dioscoro Umali Medal) from the DOST and NAST in recognition of his commitment, leadership, dedication and outstanding service as scientist, teacher and administrator. His vital role in the establishment and on-going completion of the National Science Complex was particularly recognized.

He is currently the Editor-in-Chief of the Philippine Journal of Science, which published its first issue in 1906.

Saloma became the first Filipino Optica Fellow in January 2025 in recognition of his pioneering research and development efforts in optics and photonics in the Philippines, including the training of young Filipino scientists. He was elevated to Senior Member status by the board of directors of the Optical Society of America in October 2010.

He carries the rank of Professor 12 and on 2 March 2011, he was elected Chancellor of the University of the Philippines Diliman by the UP Board of Regents. He served for a period of three years. He was succeeded by medical anthropologist and College of Social Sciences & Philosophy Dean Dr. Michael L. Tan on 1 March 2014.
