= Michael Tan =

Filipino medical anthropologist, veterinarian, writer, and professor

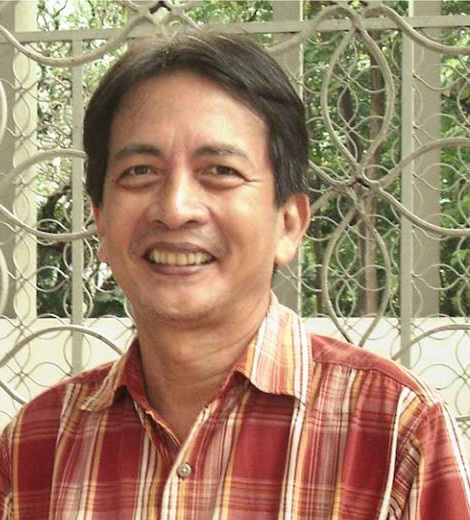
- Michael L. Tan

10th Chancellor of the University of the Philippines Diliman
- In office March 1, 2014 – March 1, 2020
- President: Alfredo E. Pascual; Danilo Concepcion
- Preceded by: Caesar Saloma
- Succeeded by: Fidel Nemenzo

Dean of the University of the Philippines College of Social Sciences and Philosophy
- In office August 2010 – February 2014

Chair of the Department of Anthropology, University of the Philippines College of Social Sciences and Philosophy
- In office 2001–2010

Personal details
- Born: September 12, 1952 (age 73) Caloocan, Rizal, Philippines
- Spouse: Angela Choi
- Education: Ateneo de Manila University; University of San Francisco; University of the Philippines Diliman (DVM, 1977); Texas A&M University (M.A., 1982); University of Amsterdam (PhD, 1996)
- Occupation: Medical anthropologist; professor; author; newspaper columnist; veterinarian
- Scientific career
- Fields: Medical anthropology
- Institutions: University of the Philippines Diliman; National Academy of Science and Technology
- Thesis: Magaling na gamot: pharmaceuticals and the construction of power and knowledge in the Philippines (1996)
- Doctoral advisor: Sjaak Van Der Geest

Michael Lim Tan (born 1952) is a Filipino medical anthropologist, veterinarian, and writer who is currently a professor at the University of the Philippines Diliman (UP Diliman) College of Social Sciences and Philosophy. Tan served as the chancellor of UP Diliman from 2014 to 2020.

Prior to his appointment as UPD chancellor, Tan was already well known for his work among non-governmental organizations in the Philippines, and for his column Pinoy Kasi, which appears twice a week in the Philippine Daily Inquirer.

On February 27, 2014, the University of the Philippines Board of Regents appointed Tan to serve as the chancellor of the University of the Philippines Diliman, where he was serving as Dean of the College of Social Sciences and Philosophy (CSSP). Tan initially served as Chancellor from March 1, 2014, to February 28, 2017, then a second term that lasted until March 1, 2020 when the Board of Regents reappointed him.

Tan has authored numerous books and articles, often focusing on: indigenous medical beliefs, sex and sexuality, reproductive and sexual health (particularly HIV/AIDS), pharmaceuticals, and health policy issues.

== Education and early career ==
The son of Julio Tan and Apolonia Nieves Lim, Tan grew up in the City of San Juan, Metro Manila, where he had his early education at the Xavier School, a private Catholic college preparatory school for boys run by the Society of Jesus' Philippine Province, graduating in 1969.

He majored in biology at the Ateneo de Manila University, then transferred to the University of San Francisco, taking up the same degree. He eventually got a degree in veterinary medicine from the University of the Philippines Diliman in 1977, and from there he pursued a career as a veterinarian, which included a brief teaching stint at the veterinary school of Araneta University (now De La Salle Araneta University), before moving on "to human public health and pharmacology...and eventually, medical anthropology."

Tan also works with the Ateneo de Manila University, "teaching doctors to be more sensitive to the social and cultural aspects of healthcare."

He earned a Master of Arts in Anthropology from the Texas A&M University in 1982, and then obtained his PhD in social and political science from the Medical Anthropology Unit of the University of Amsterdam in 1996.

== Academic career ==
=== Election to the National Academy of Science and Technology ===
In 2012, Tan was elected member of the Philippines' National Academy of Science and Technology (NAST), the country's highest advisory body in matters of science and technology.

The citation that came with his election cited his contribution to scientific research, teaching, advocacy and development work, particularly his efforts to revitalize research on and in the use of traditional medicine, develop rational drug policies, and understand the social and behavioral dimensions of HIV/AIDS prevention and of reproductive health promotion.

=== Appointment to the University of the Philippines Diliman Chancellorship ===
On February 27, 2014, the University of the Philippines Board of Regents appointed Tan to serve as the next chancellor of the University of the Philippines Diliman, where he currently serves as Dean of the College of Social Sciences and Philosophy (CSSP). The announcement stated that Tan will serve as Chancellor from March 1, 2014, to February 28, 2017.

When Tan presented his vision at the public fora for nominees to the UP Diliman chancellorship on Jan. 23, 2014, he noted that it was important for UP to “go beyond resting on laurels,” and instead live up to its mandate as a national university.

The Tinig ng Plaridel, the official student publication of the University of the Philippines College of Mass Communication, reported that Tan said he "would focus on creating a safe, interconnected and nurturing environment that will enable students to shape the world around them."

The Philippine Daily Inquirer quoted him as saying:

“My vision is of a UP that takes its place as a national university, a place to nurture not just brightness but diversity. UP Diliman must show the way in transdisciplinary initiatives in teaching, our graduates grounded in the liberal arts, able to see and appreciate the poetry in mathematics, as well as the mathematics in poetry.... I envision a UP in terms of a shared culture of academic citizenship built on collegiality, a sense of justice and fairness, and ethics.”

The Philippine Collegian, UP Diliman's official student newspaper, reported that Tan had won the appointment by seven votes. Other nominees who got votes from the three remaining regents were incumbent UP Diliman Chancellor Dr. Caesar Saloma, and UP Center for Women's Studies Director Dr. Sylvia Claudio.

Tan's term ended on March 1, 2020, and was succeeded by former Vice Chancellor for Research and Development Fidel Nemenzo.

== Writing ==
Although he is now best known for his work as a columnist, Tan was already a well recognized writer among academics and NGO workers when he began his Pinoy Kasi columns for the Philippine Daily Inquirer in May 1997.

Profiling him as an awardee Dr. Jose P. Rizal Awards of Excellence in 2005, the Manila Times and the Kaisa Para Sa Kaunlaran Foundation noted that:

Through his writings, Tan encourages readers to think out of the box and critically on social issues. Topics on family relationships, gender and generation issues, care for the environment and even for family pets trigger readers’ responses and often become topics in many dinner discussions... His writings (both academic and popular ones) disseminate crucial information that affects lives.

=== "Pinoy Kasi" ===
In the maiden article of his Philippine Daily Inquirer column, he proposed "A middle way of looking at Filipino culture, avoiding one extreme of protracted Lenten self-flagellation that could see nothing good in the Filipino, but also being mature enough to talk about our faults."

Regarding the choice of name, he explained further:

At that time, I thought that "Pinoy Kasi" would reflect the middle way, sometimes uttered in despair, exasperation, even shame but also... I hoped it would be more often said in awe, wonder, and pride.

=== "Sense and Science" ===
In February 2013, Tan also began a blog for GMA News Online, titled "Sense and Science".

== Gallery ==
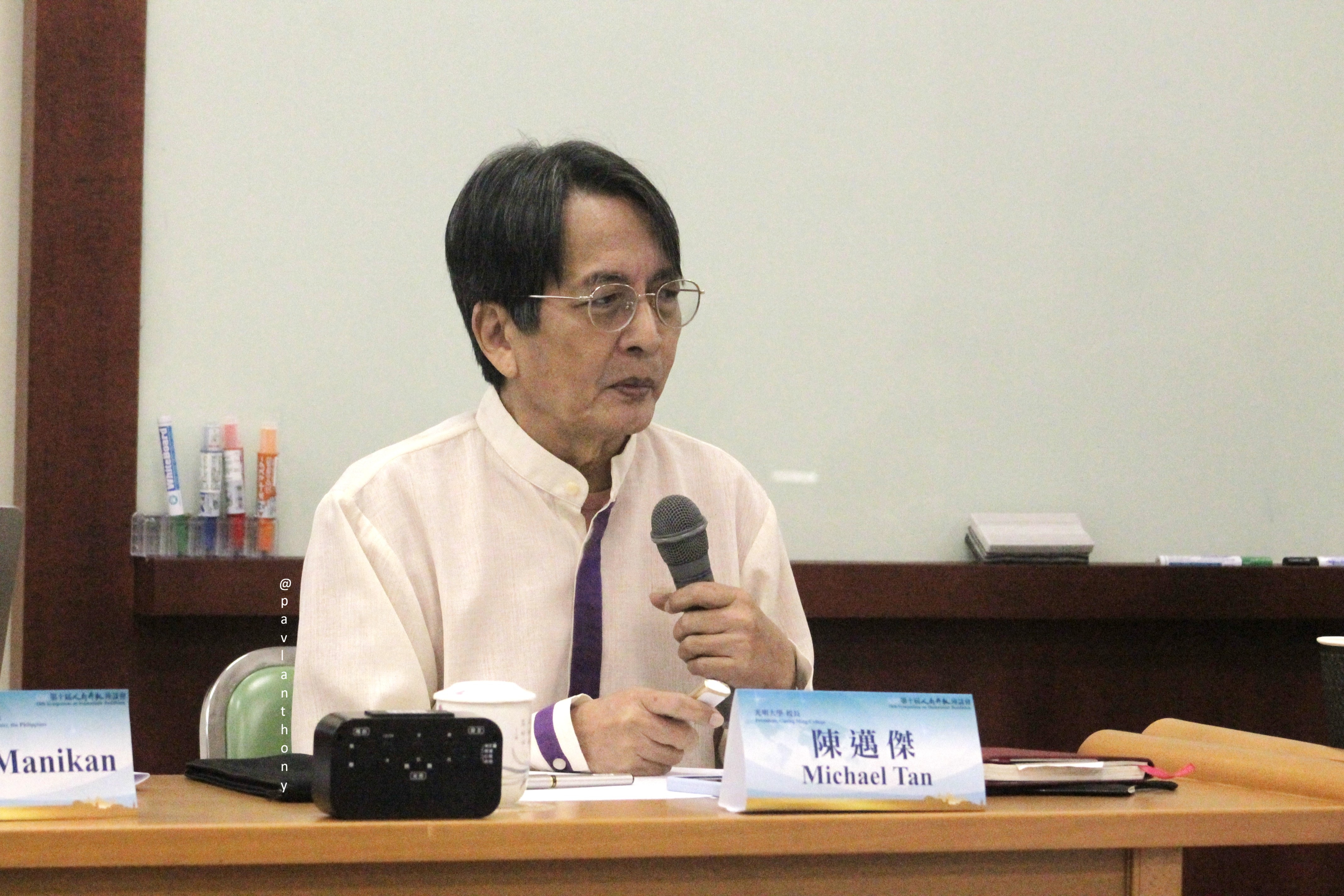
Michael Tan during the 10th International Symposium on Humanistic Buddhism at Fo Guang Shan Monastery in Kaohsiung, Taiwan
