= Edgardo Gomez =

Filipino biologist (1938–2019)

Edgardo Gomez ONS
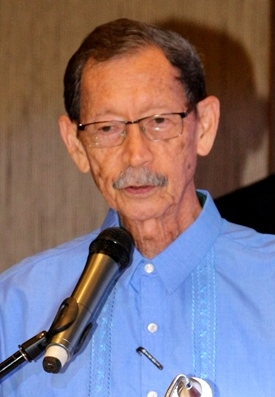
- Gomez in 2017
- Born: Edgardo Dizon Gomez; 7 November 1938
- Died: 1 December 2019 (aged 81)
- Education: De La Salle University; St. Mary's University of Minnesota; University of California, San Diego
- Occupation: Biologist
- Spouse: Phoebe Abaya
- Awards: Order of National Scientists of the Philippines (2014)

Edgardo Dizon Gomez, ONS (November 7, 1938 – December 1, 2019) was a Filipino biologist who was conferred the rank of National Scientist of the Philippines in 2014. He was a professor emeritus for marine biology at the University of the Philippines Marine Science Institute.

== Education and career ==
Gomez obtained his bachelor's degree in education, major in English and Social Science (summa cum laude) from De La Salle University, his master's degree in Biology as a Fulbright Travel Grantee from St. Mary's University of Minnesota and Ph.D. degree in Marine Biology from University of California, San Diego. He was the founding director of the Marine Science Institute at the University of the Philippines Diliman upon his return in 1973 after his doctorate studies.

== Contributions ==
Gomez saw the need to protect the Philippine archipelago's vast marine resources in particular that of coral reefs. He led the world's first national-scale assessment of damage to coral reefs leading to international conservation initiatives such as the replanting of corals. He also pioneered giant clam (Tridacna gigas) breeding stationed in Bolinao and other protective areas for coastal communities of the Philippines.

Additionally, he took part in creating the baseline map of the Philippines, and provided information to the Philippine government during talks over the territorial disputes in the Spratly Islands. In 2007, he pioneered the study on ocean acidification caused by increased levels of absorbed carbon dioxide in the ocean.

Gomez was conferred the rank of National Scientist of the Philippines in 2014 by Benigno Aquino III, the President of the Philippines. This award, which comes with a lifetime pension, has been bestowed upon over thirty leading scientists. The confirmation ceremony took place at the Rizal Hall of the Malacañan Palace where Gomez was awarded for his research and conservation efforts in invertebrate biology and ecology on 12 August 2014.

== Awards and recognition ==
- Laureate in the United Nations' Environmental Programme's (UNEP) Global 500 Roll of Honour in 1989
- The Outstanding Filipinos (TOFIL) Award for Science (Marine Biology) in 1992
- Academician by the National Academy of Science and Technology (NAST) in 1993
- Presidential Lingkod Bayan Awardee in 2000
- Pew Marine Conservation Fellow in 2001
- National Scientist of the Philippines for Marine Biology in 2014
- Asian Scientist 100, Asian Scientist, 2021
- On April 22, 2024, the Marine Science Institute, in its 50th founding anniversary, was re-named Edgardo D. Gomez Hall. The Marine Biodiversity Resources and Information System (MBRIS) building was inaugurated containing “MSI reference collections of marine organisms, libraries of natural products extracted from these organisms and other marine biodiversity collections,” MSI professor Maria Celia Malay announced.

== Personal life ==
Gomez was married to career ambassador Phoebe Abaya. They have a son, Jose Edgardo Jr.
