= University of the Philippines College of Science =

Coordinates: 14°38′59″N 121°4′18″E

UP College of Science
- Unibersidad ng Pilipinas Diliman - Dalubhasaan ng Agham
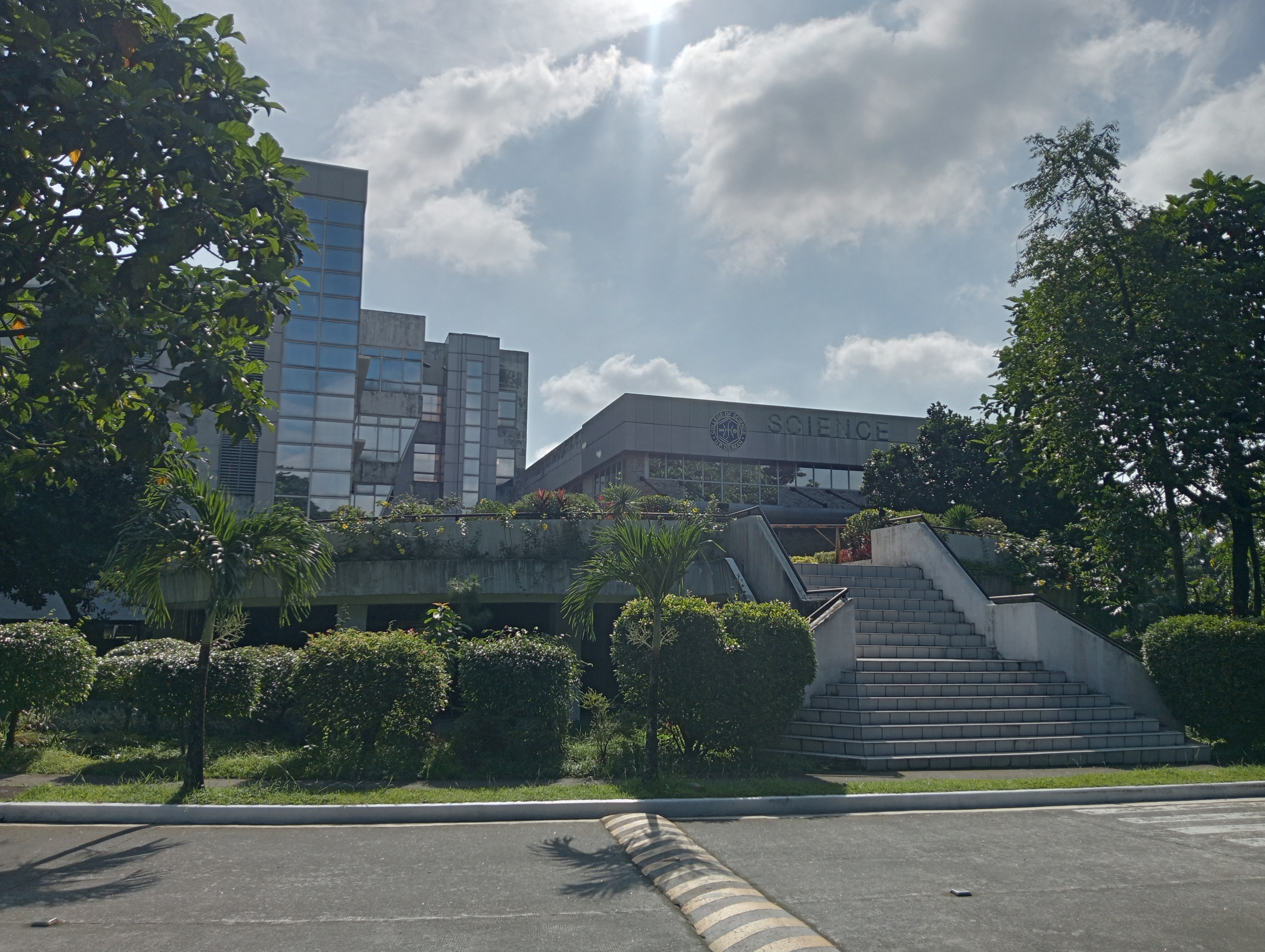
- Type: University of the Philippines College (officially Degree-Granting Unit)
- Established: October 6, 1983
- Dean: Cynthia P. Saloma, Ph.D.
- Associate Deans: Marie Christine M. Obusan, Ph.D. (College Secretary); Manuel Joseph C. Loquias, Ph.D. (Academic Affairs); Leilani S. Dacones, Ph.D. (Student and Public Affairs); Betchaida D. Payot, Ph.D. (Research and Extension); Allan Christopher C. Yago, Ph.D. (Resources and Facilities)
- Faculty: 147 Ph.D. (Sem 1, 2010-11)
- Students: 1,312 (Undergraduate); 1,170 (Graduate and Post-Graduate)
- Location: National Science Complex, UP Diliman, Quezon City, Philippines
- Website: www.science.upd.edu.ph
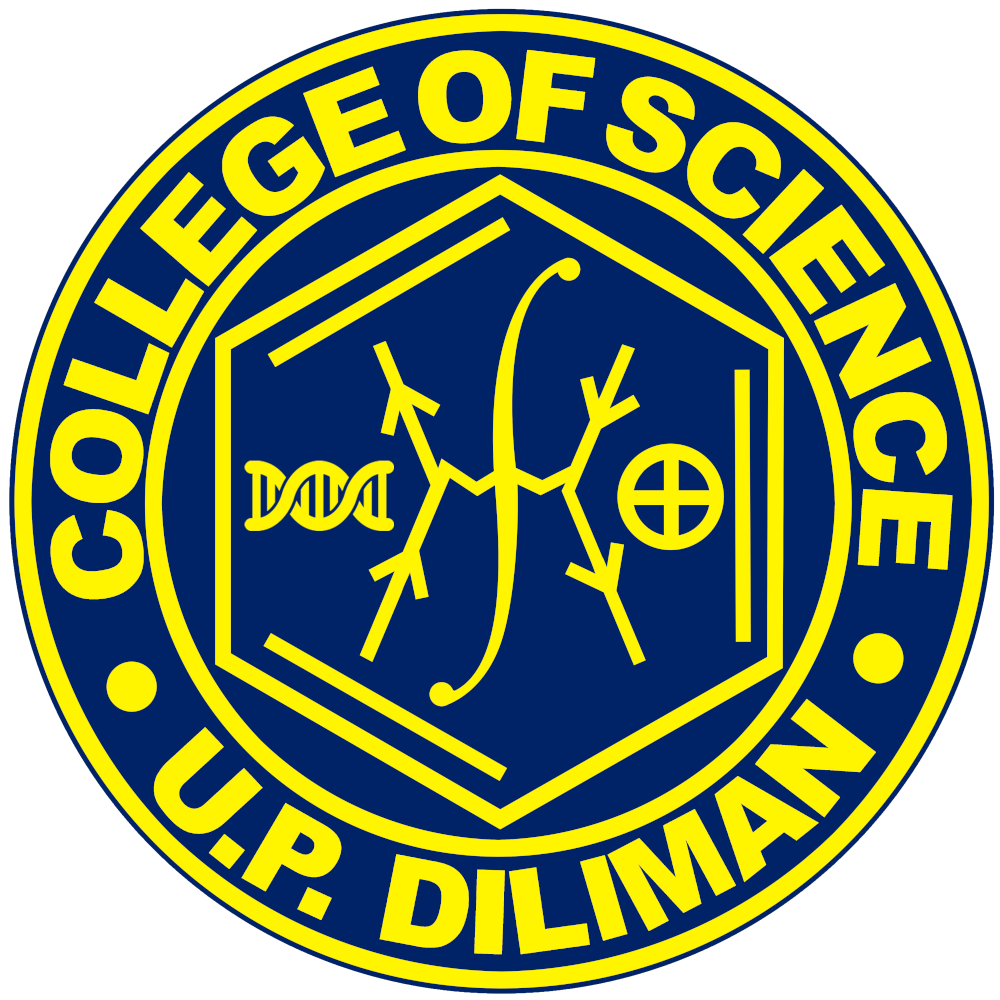

The U.P. College of Science is one of the several colleges (or degree-granting units) of the University of the Philippines Diliman, the flagship campus of the University of the Philippines System.

The college, located at the National Science Complex, is composed of eight institutes, two inter-programs and three affiliated units.

== Organization ==
Deans of the College of Science University of the Philippines Diliman
Dr. Roger Posadas	1983 – 1993
Dr. Danilo Yanga	November 1993 – May 1994 (Acting Dean) June 1994 – May 2000
Dr. Rhodora Azanza	June 2000 – May 2006
Dr. Caesar Saloma	June 2006 – March 2011
Dr. Jose Maria P. Balmaceda	May 2011 – October 2017
Dr. Perry S. Ong	October 2017 – March 2019
Dr. Giovanni A. Tapang	July 2019 – August 2025
Dr. Cynthia P. Saloma	September 2025 – Present

=== Institutes ===
- National Institute of Geological Science (NIGS)
- National Institute of Physics (NIP)
- National Institute of Molecular Biology and Biotechnology (NIMBB)
- Institute of Biology (IB)
- Institute of Chemistry (IC)
- Institute of Mathematics (IM)
- Marine Science Institute (MSI)
- Institute of Environmental Science and Meteorology (IESM)

=== Academic Department and Interdepartmental programs ===
- Data Science Program (DSP)
- Science and Society Program (SSP)
- Materials Science and Engineering Program (MSEP)

=== Affiliate Units ===
- Natural Sciences Research Institute (NSRI)
- Computational Science Research Center (CSRC)
- UPD College of Science Library (CSLib)

== Student Publication ==
=== Scientia ===
Scientia (Latin for science) is the official student publication of the college. It is the only student college publication which has its own office located at the basement of the College of Science Library building.

== National Centers of Excellence ==
As of 2016, the Commission on Higher Education of the Philippines has identified 23 centers of excellence (COEs) in U.P. Diliman, eight (8) of which can be found in the College of Science. (See all UP Diliman Centers of Excellence/Development).

The COEs in the college are Biology, Chemistry, Geology, Marine Science, Environmental Science, Mathematics, Molecular Biology & Biotechnology (MBB) and Physics.

== Gallery ==
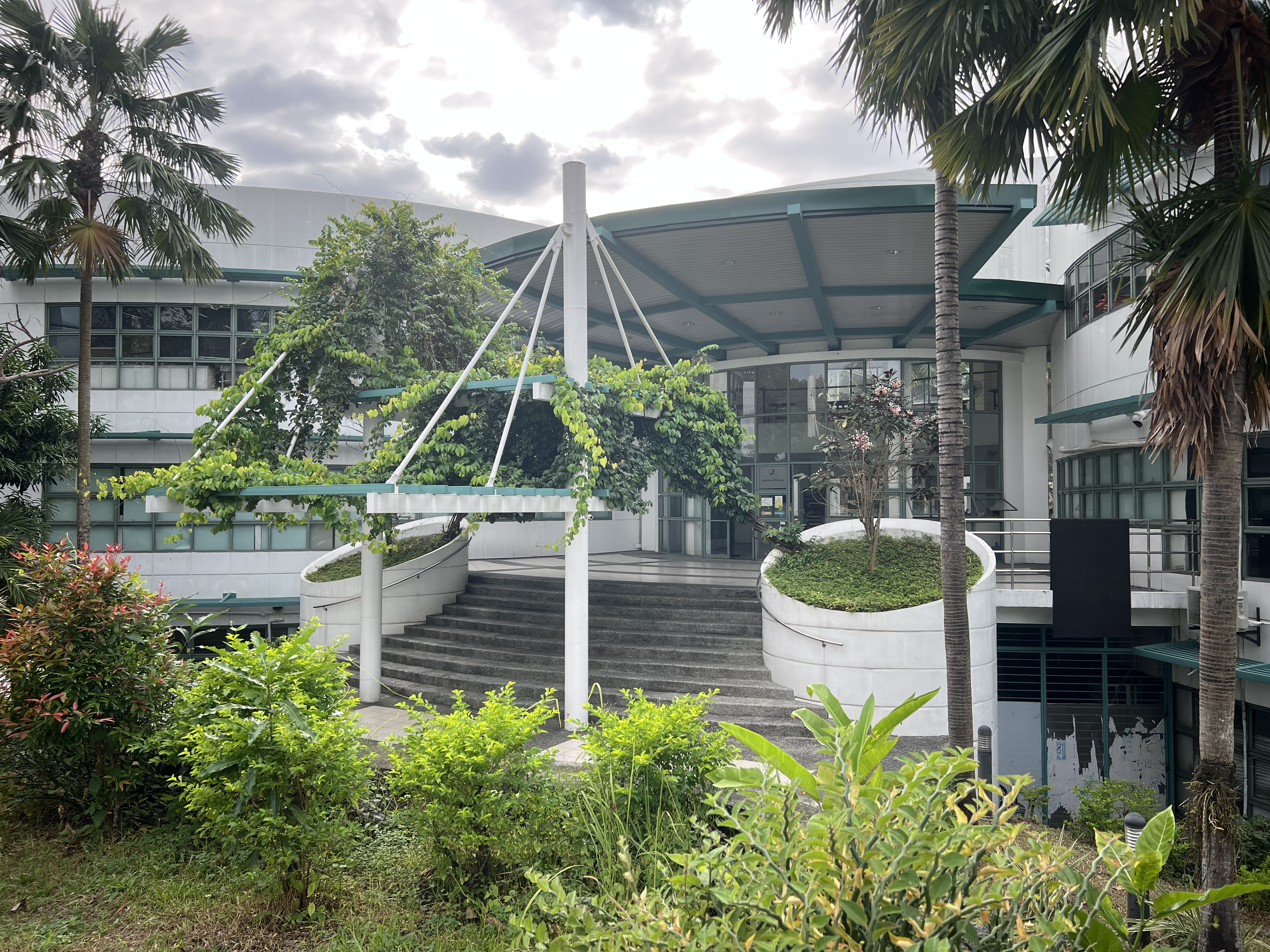
Institute of Biology

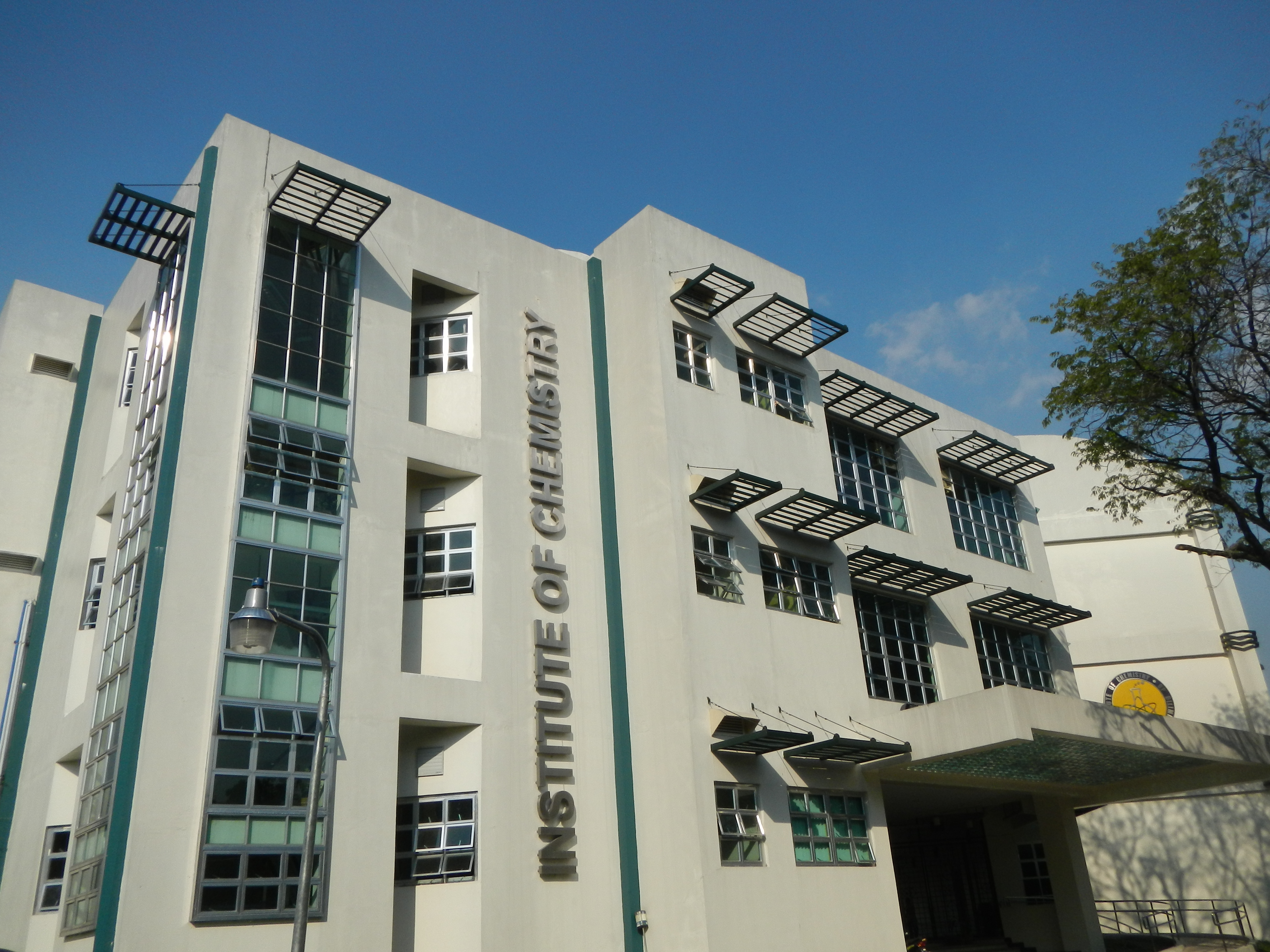
Institute of Chemistry

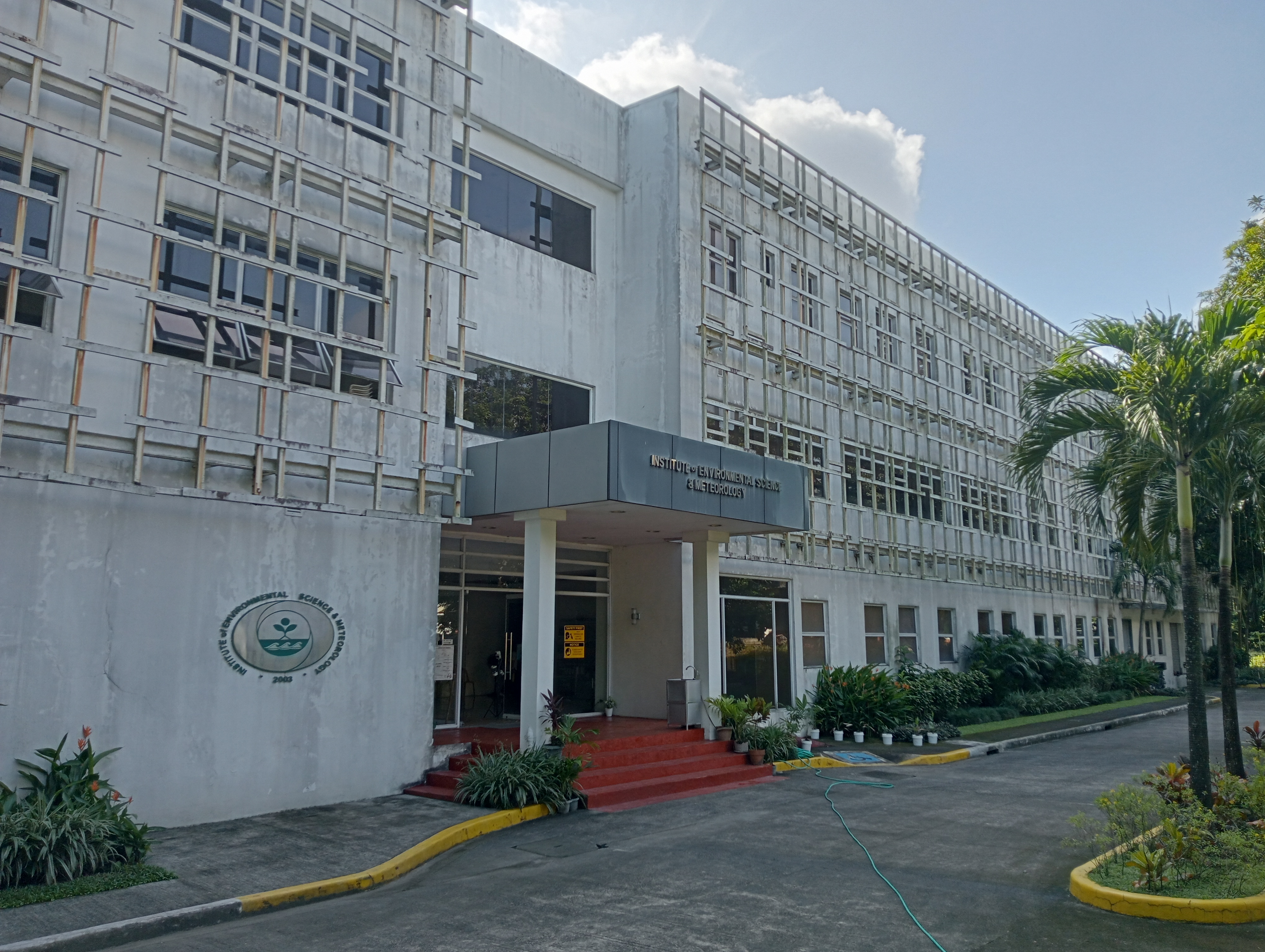
Institute of Environmental Science and Meteorology

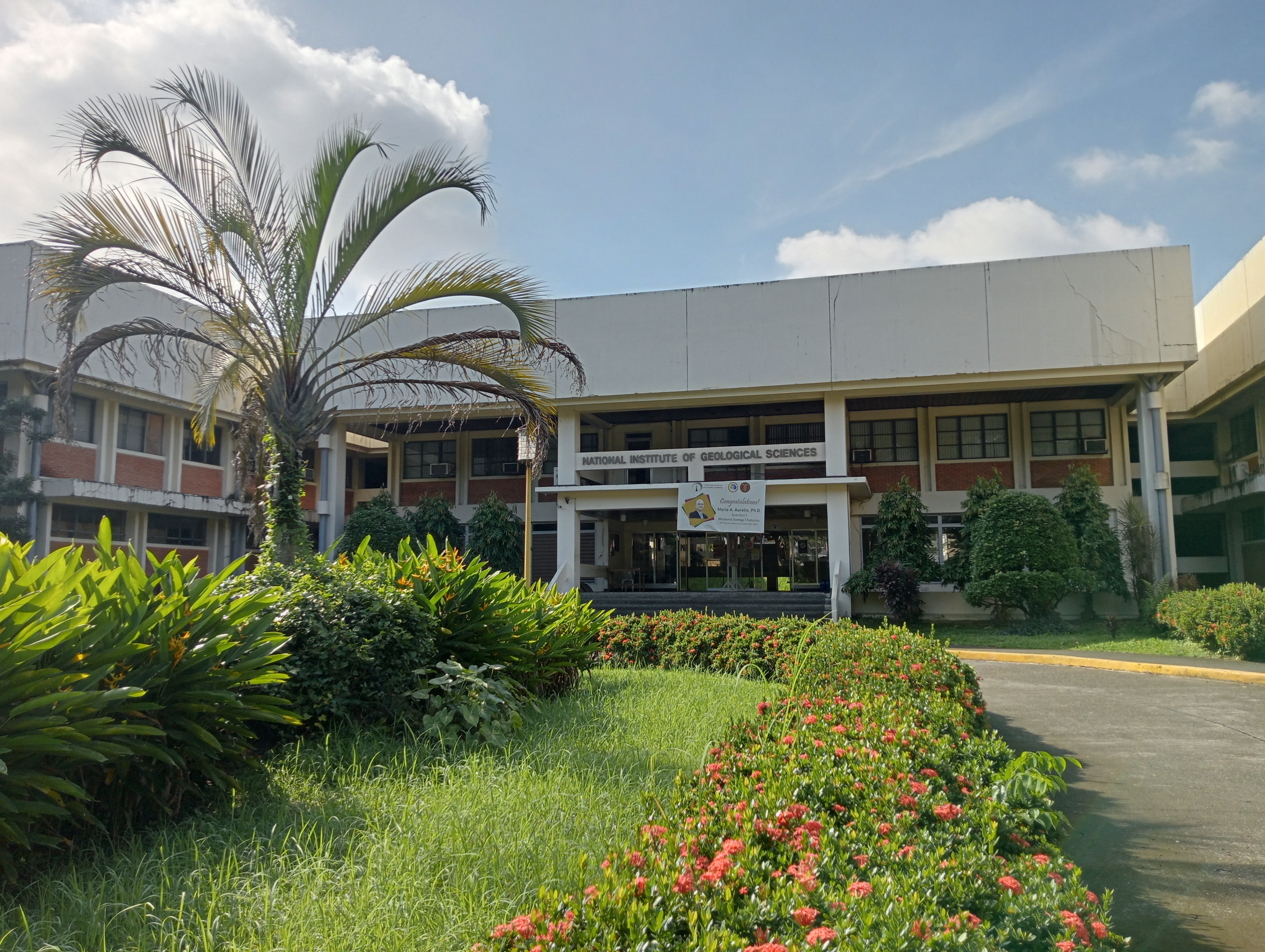
National Institute of Geological Sciences

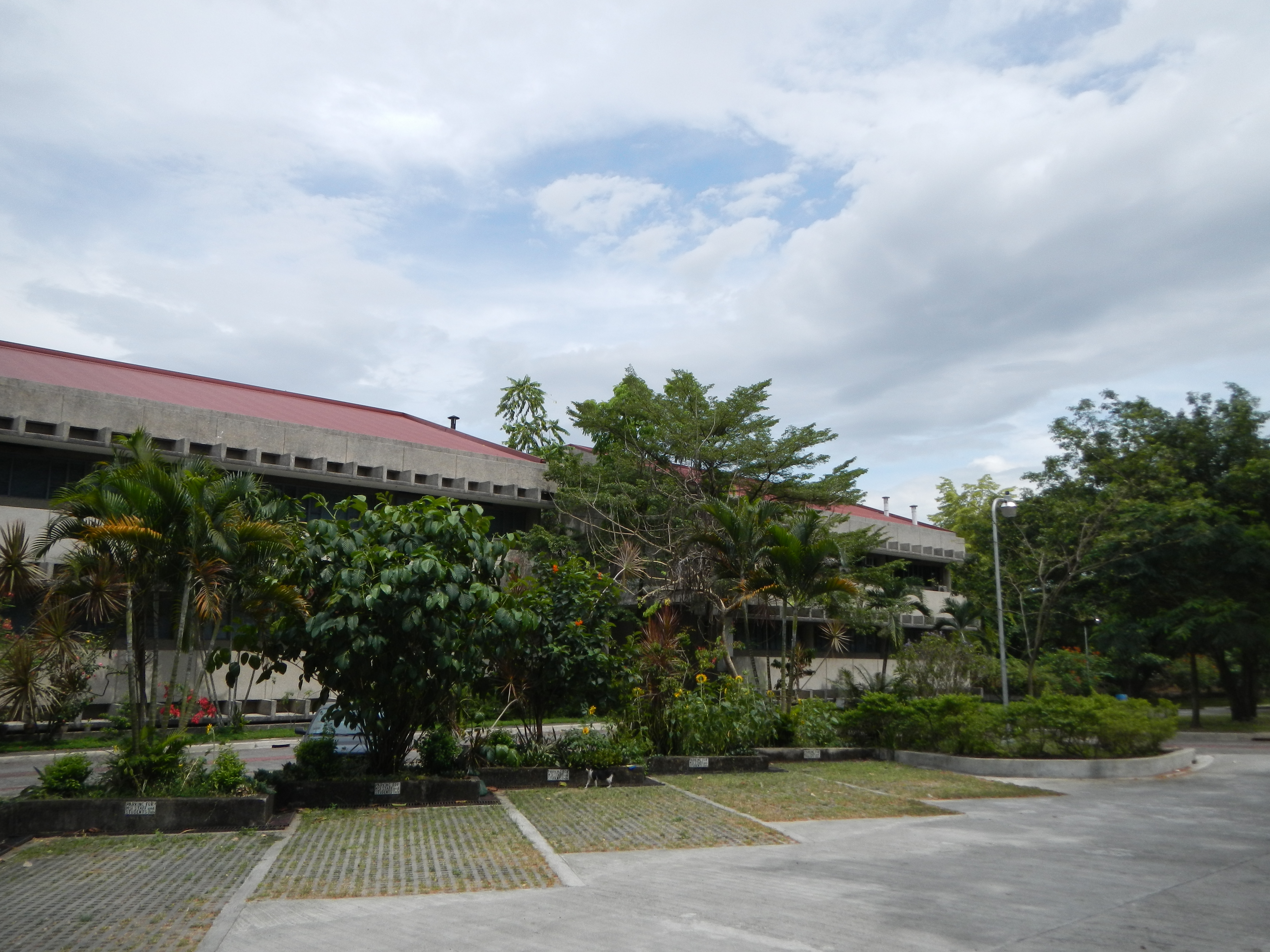
Marine Science Institute

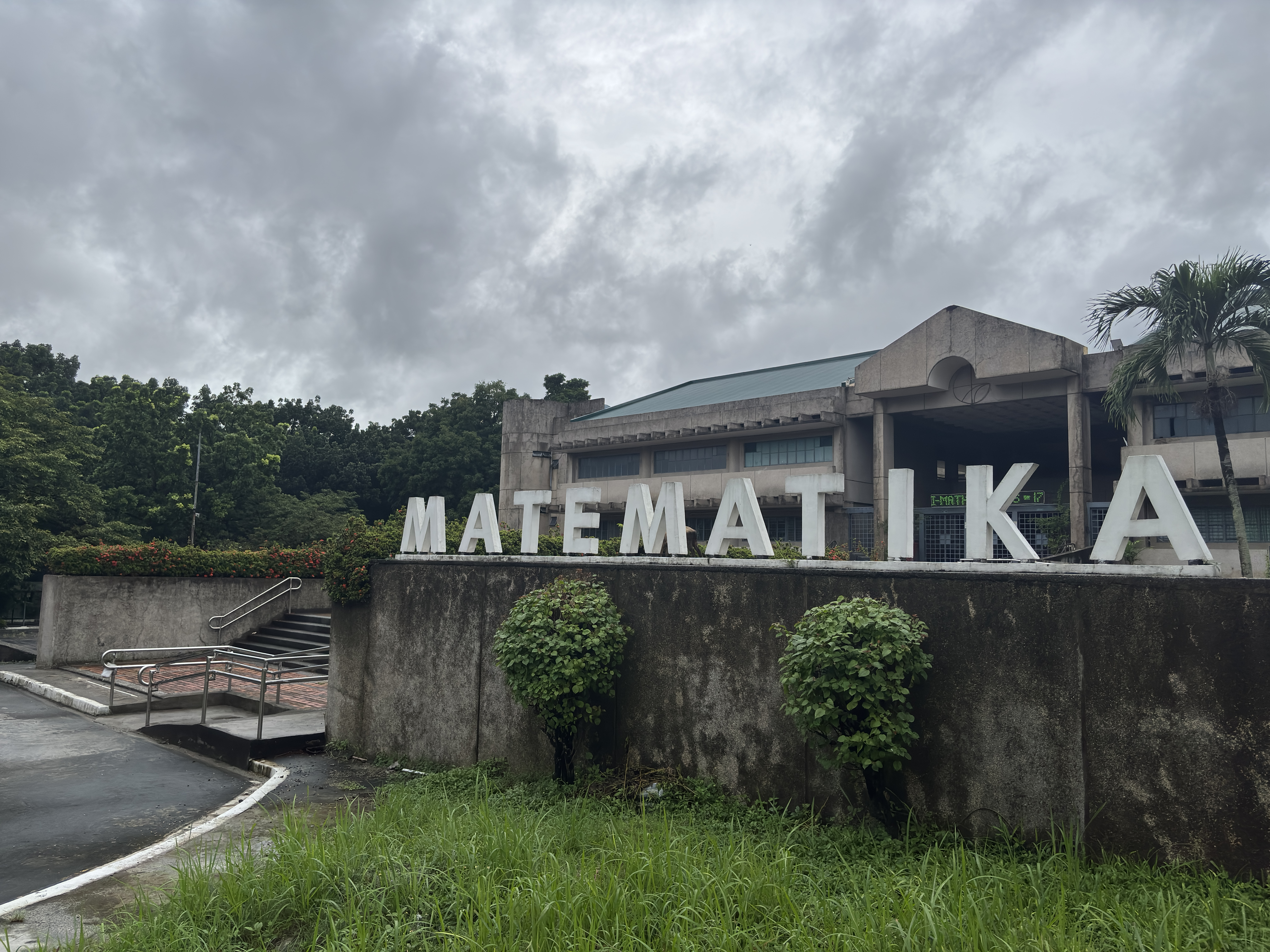
Institute of Mathematics

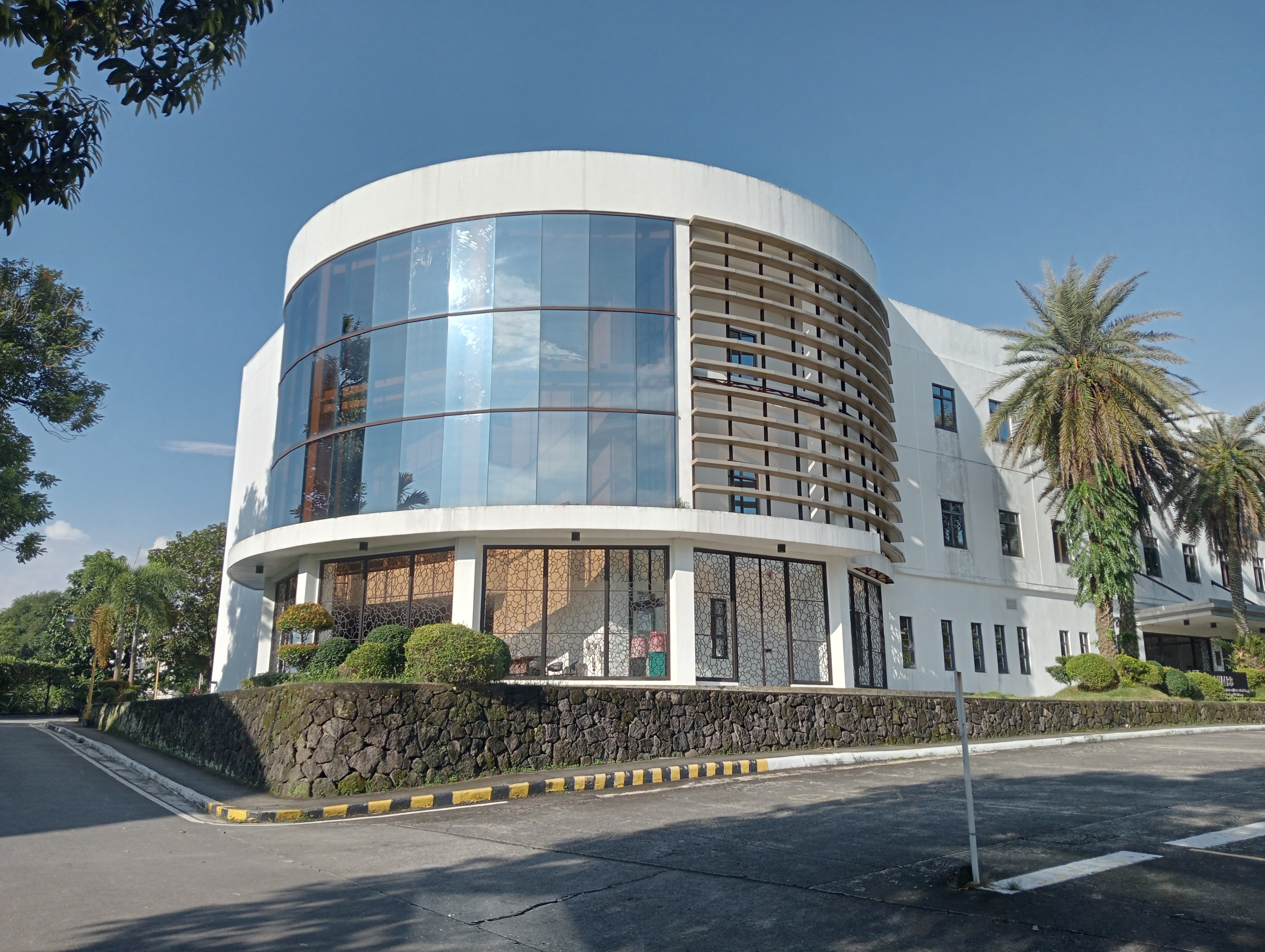
National Institute of Molecular Biology and Biotechnology

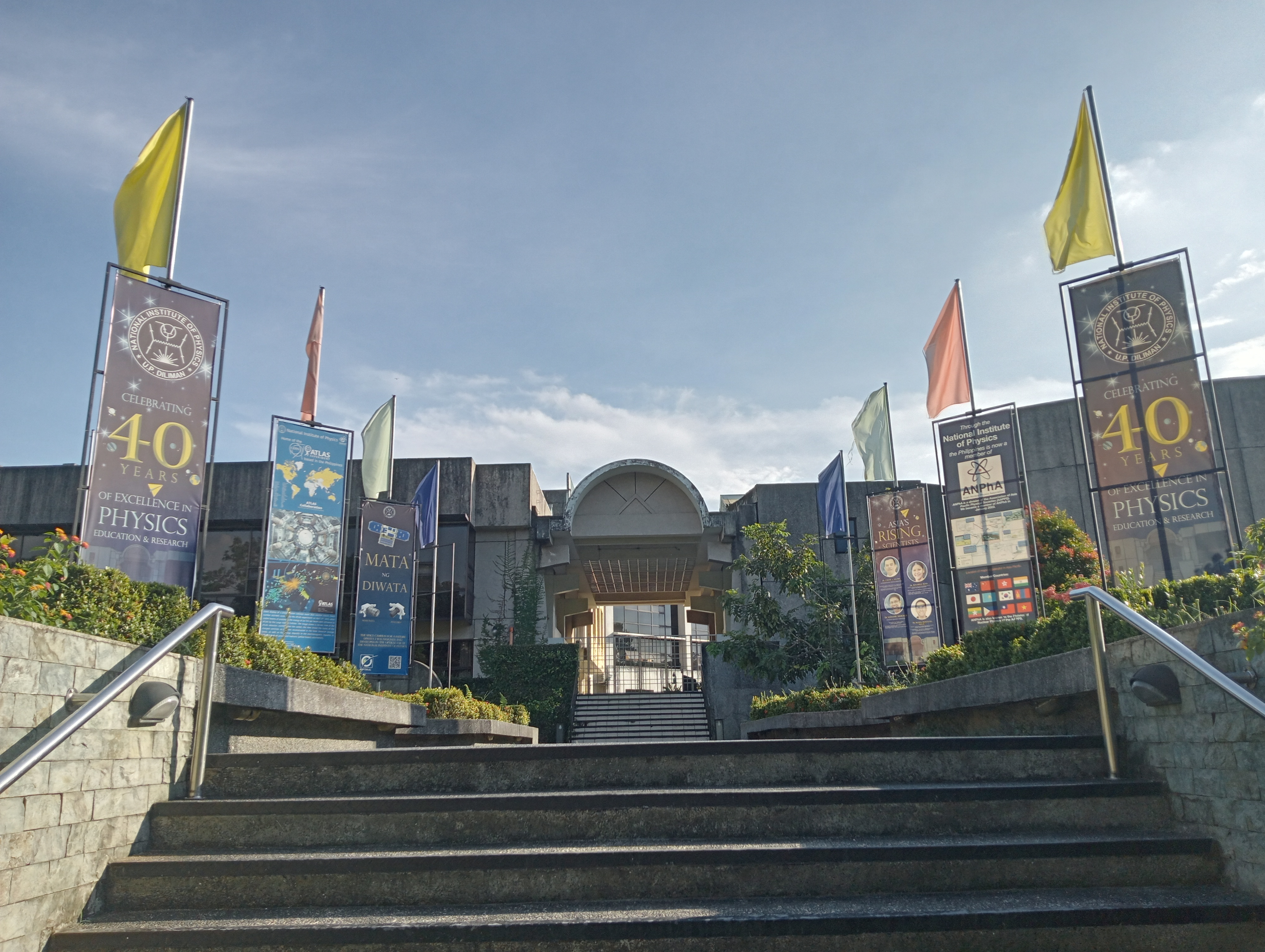
National Institute of Physics

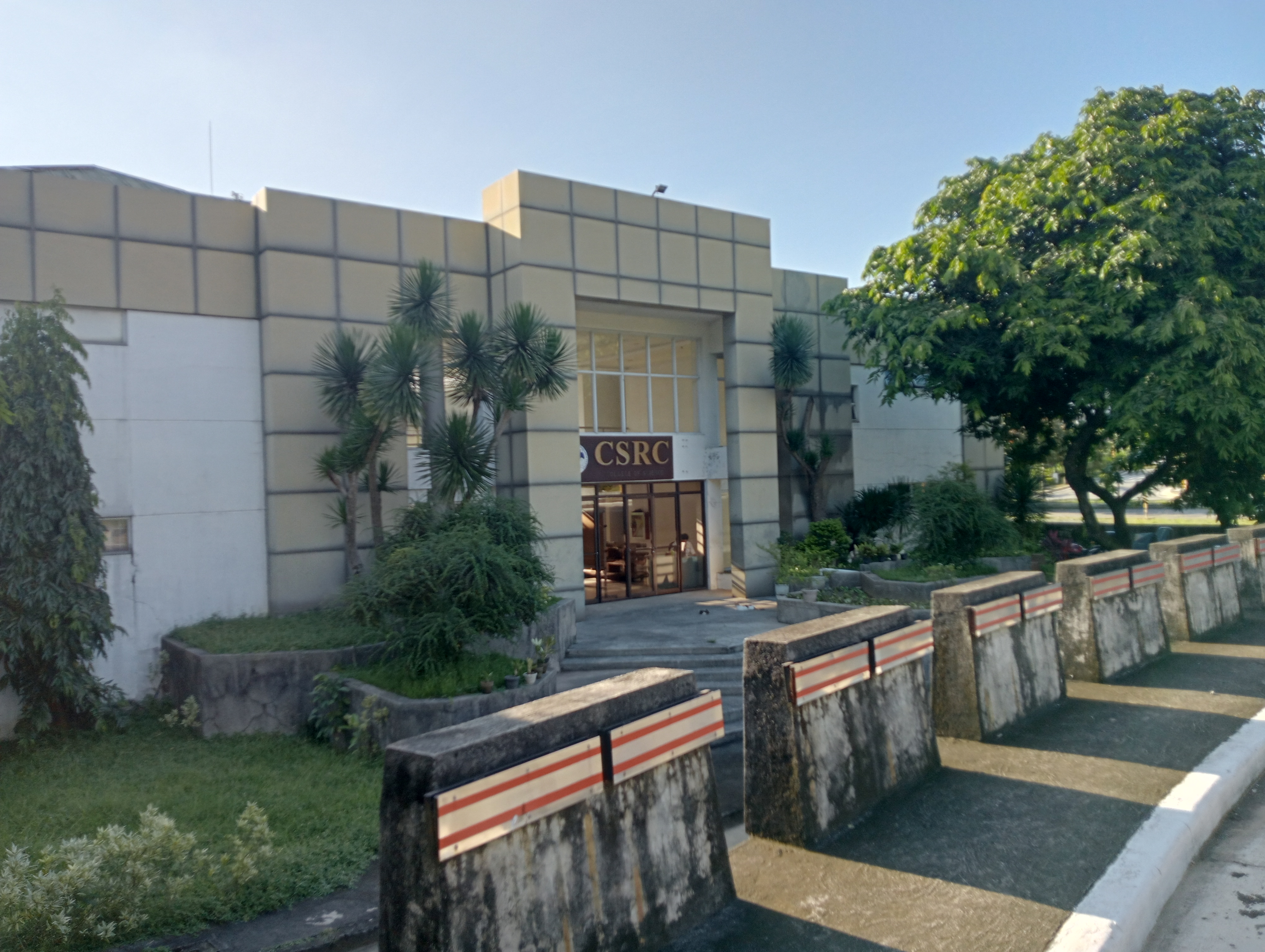
Computational Science Research Center
