= ASEAN Outstanding Scientist and Technologist Award =

The ASEAN Outstanding Scientist and Technologist Award (AOSTA) is a triennial award (recurring every three years) that was established by the ASEAN Committee on Science and Technology (COST) in the early 1990s. It is given to scientists and technologists in ASEAN member countries whose outstanding S&T achievements have been nationally and internationally recognized.

To qualify a nominee must satisfy the following minimum criteria:

- Must hold a nationality of an ASEAN member country;
- Must be recommended for final judging by the COST National Secretariat of his or her country, which should ideally recommend only one nominee (per nomination cycle);
- Should be individual, not group of individuals;
- Must be living, preferably actively working scientists or technologists, with at least 5 years of active contribution to the progress of science and technology;
- Must have respectable moral character.

Previous recipients of AOSTA are: Yodhathai Thebtaranonth (1995, Thailand), Bienvenido Juliano (1998, Philippines), Lourdes Cruz (2001, Philippines), Looi Lai Meng (2001, Malaysia), Ariff Bongso (2005, Singapore), Sangkot Marzuki (2005, Indonesia), Caesar Saloma (2008, Philippines) and Harith Ahmad (2014, Malaysia).
