= Marine Science Institute, University of the Philippines Diliman =

Academic institute of the University of the Philippines' College of Science

The Marine Science Institute
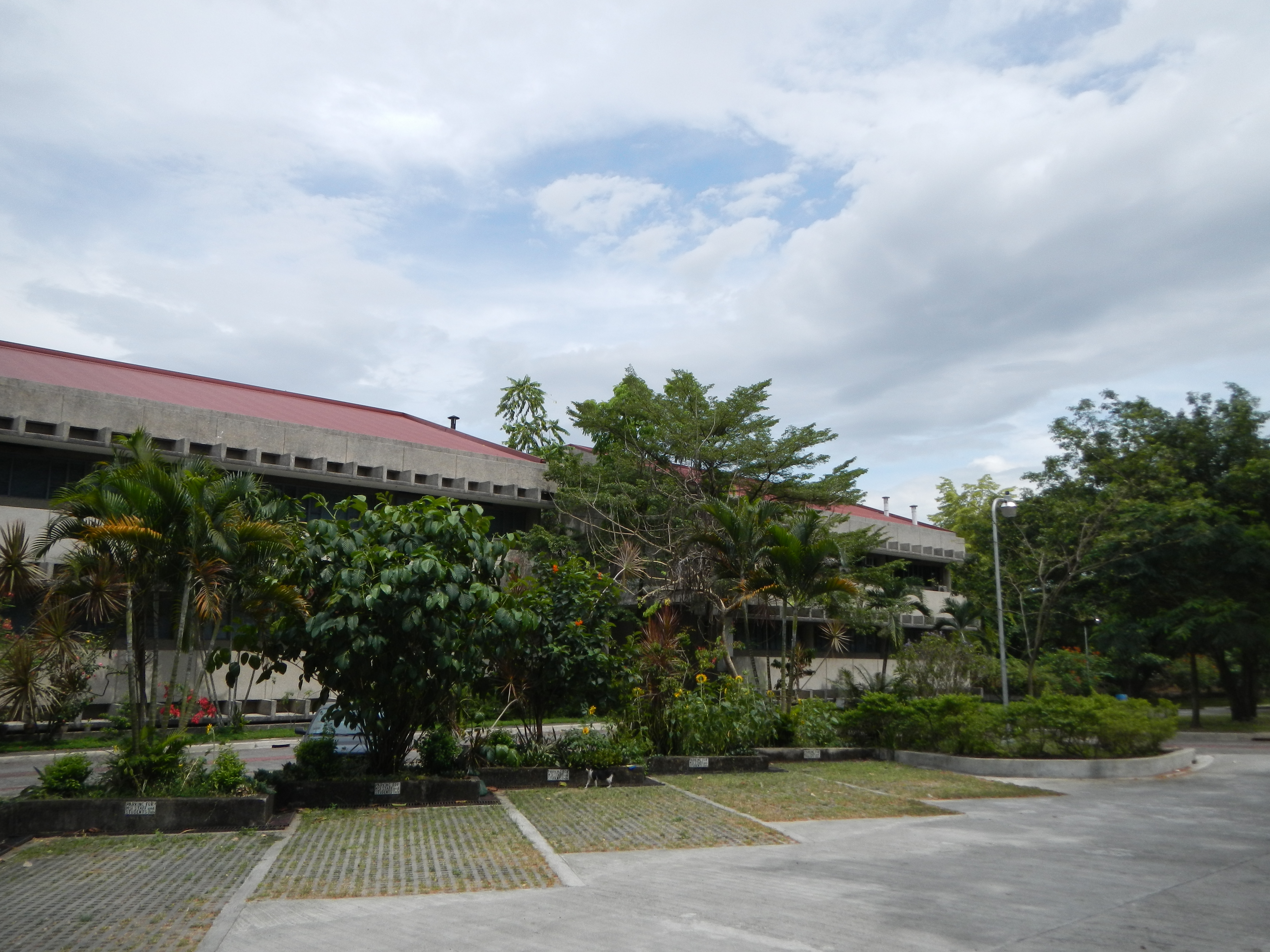
- Type: Institute
- Established: March 28, 1974 (as Marine Sciences Center); April 23, 1985 (as Marine Science Institute)
- Parent institution: University of the Philippines Diliman
- Director: Dr. Arturo O. Lluisma
- Location: UP Diliman, Quezon City, Philippines; 14°39′02″N 121°04′09″E
- Website: msi.upd.edu.ph

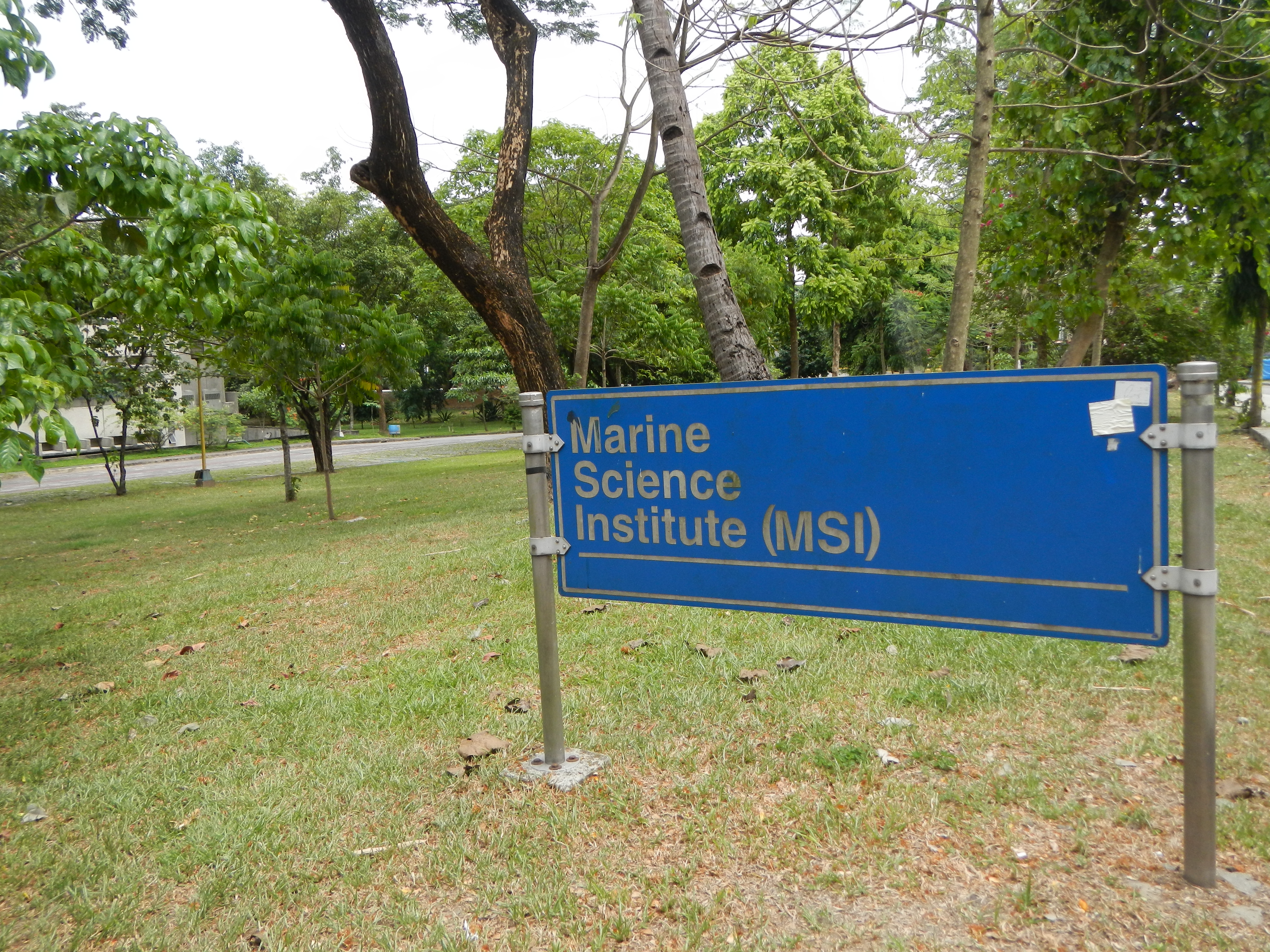
Welcome sign

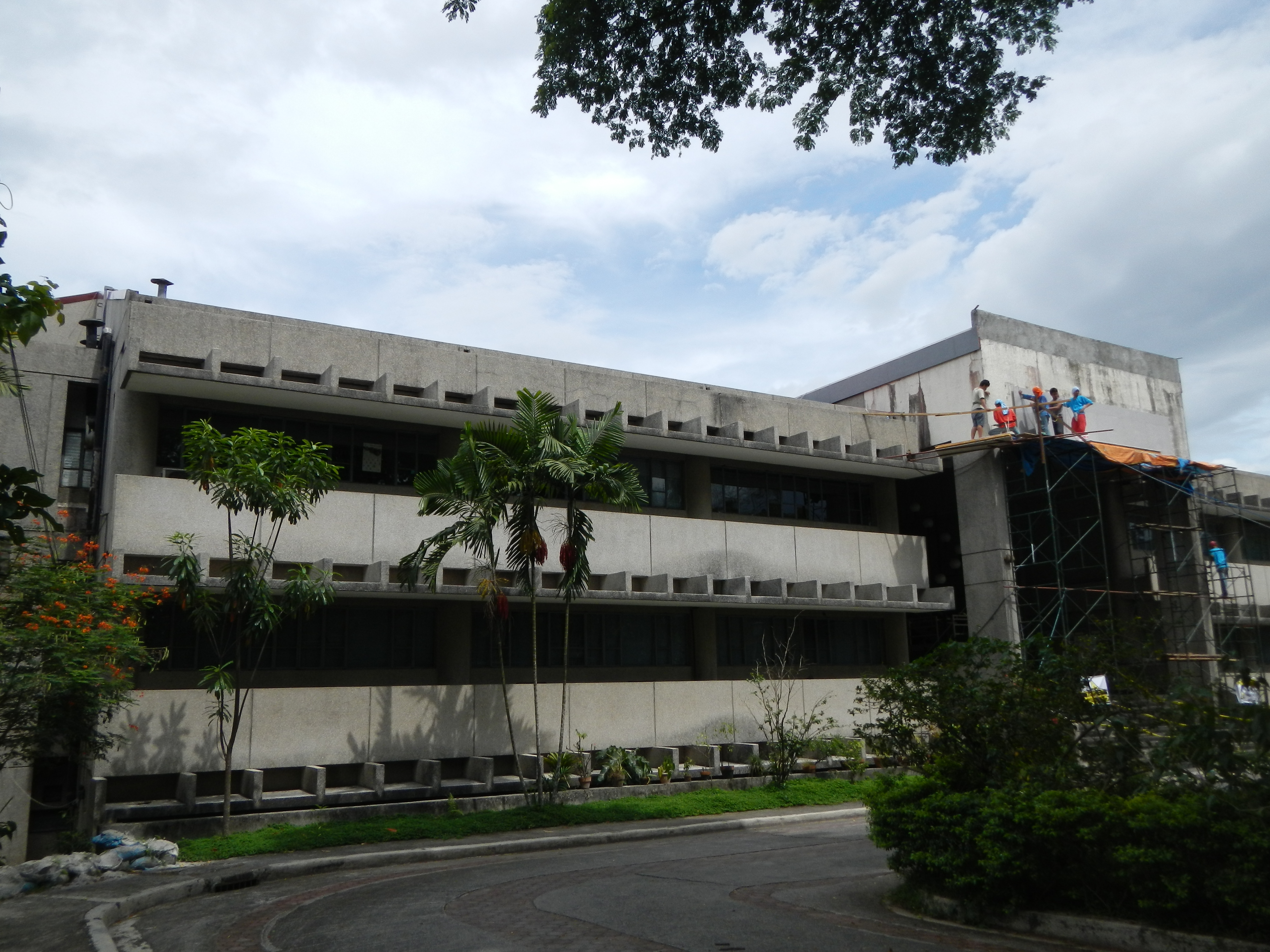
Left facade, 2013

The Marine Science Institute (MSI) is an academic institute of the University of the Philippines Diliman's College of Science. It is housed in its own building complex within the UP Diliman Campus in Quezon City. The Marine Science Institute offers MSc and PhD degrees in Marine Science. Students taking either degree choose to specialize in a specific field, either Marine Biology, Marine Physical Science or Marine Biotechnology. MSI is the leading center for marine and coastal research in the Philippines.

== History ==
The University of the Philippines Marine Science Institute was originally established as the Marine Sciences Center with the approval of its charter by the Board of Regents on 28 March 1974.

The Marine Science Center served as the university's coordinating base for marine research. In June of the same year, its first advisory executive council was formed with the appointment of Dr. Edgardo D. Gomez as acting director. The center commenced its operations in February 1975 at the building of the U.P. Natural Sciences Research Institute. With its transformation into an institute on 23 April 1985, it began offering graduate programs.

On November 9, 1983, succeeding the talks of founder and director Dr. Edgardo D. Gomez to the local officials of Bolinao, Pangasinan, a land site was donated to the Marine Science Institute. In 1986, a grant was given to the Marine Science Institute to establish additional laboratories and dormitories. This resulted to the establishment and development of the Bolinao Marine Laboratory.

The Marine Science Institute is tasked to pursue research, teaching, and extension work in marine biology, marine chemistry, physical oceanography, marine geology, and related disciplines. Various graduate courses are offered by the institute. In addition to its plethora of graduate courses, the institute also offers several introductory courses for interested undergraduates.

On April 22, 2024, MSI, in its 50th founding anniversary, was re-named Edgardo D. Gomez Hall. The Marine Biodiversity Resources and Information System (MBRIS) building was inaugurated containing “MSI reference collections of marine organisms, libraries of natural products extracted from these organisms and other marine biodiversity collections,” MSI professor Maria Celia Malay announced.

== Research interests ==
The institute engages in various avenues of research within the marine sciences from oceanography, marine biology and marine biotechnology.

The largest phycological herbarium in the country – the G.T. Velasquez Herbarium was founded here by Professor Gavino Trono. It has over 55, 000 dried specimens from 70 countries. 96% of these are seaweed.

== Notable alumni ==
The Marine Science Institute has graduated three people who went on to be conferred the rank of National Scientist in its history: Lourdes Cruz, Edgardo Gomez and Gavino Trono.
