= National Institute of Physics =

Academic institute at the University of the Philippines Diliman

- Pambansang Linangan ng Pisika (Filipino)
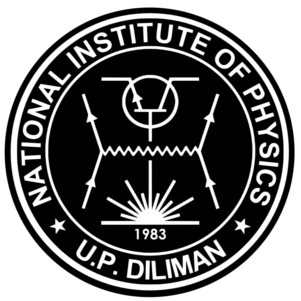
- Type: Research Institute
- Established: 1983
- Parent institution: University of the Philippines Diliman
- Affiliations: ATLAS experiment, Asian Nuclear Physics Association, STAMINA4Space
- Director: Cristine D. Villagonzalo, Dr. rer. nat.
- Location: Quezon City, Philippines; 14°38′56″N 121°4′23″E
- Campus: Urban
- Website: www.nip.upd.edu.ph
- Location in Metro Manila Location in Luzon Location in the Philippines

The National Institute of Physics (NIP) was established in 1983 by Presidential Executive Order No. 889 which transformed the Department of Physics of the College of Arts and Sciences into one of the seven research and academic institutes of the University of the Philippines Diliman - College of Science.

In 1997, the NIP has been designated as a Center of Excellence by the Commission on Higher Education. The research institute offers bachelor's degree, master's degree and doctorate degrees in physics. The research institute has also produced the first gravitational physicist in the Philippines.

== Research groups ==
The institute's faculty, graduate and undergraduate students are actively engaged in research in the following areas: Condensed Matter, Instrumentation Physics, Photonics, Structure and Dynamics, Theoretical Physics.

== Research collaborations ==
In February 2014, the European Organization for Nuclear Research (CERN) donated computer equipment to NIP to improve their theoretical high-energy physics research capabilities.

In February 2021, the Philippine's Maya-2 nanosatellite was successfully launched. This project was a collaboration between the Department of Science and Technology's Advanced Science & Technology Institute (ASTI) and UP Diliman's NIP, Electronics Engineering Institute, Institute of Environmental Science and Meteorology, and Department of Geodetic Engineering. In the same month, the NIP became an associate member of CERN's ATLAS experiment under the South African cluster.

== Gallery ==
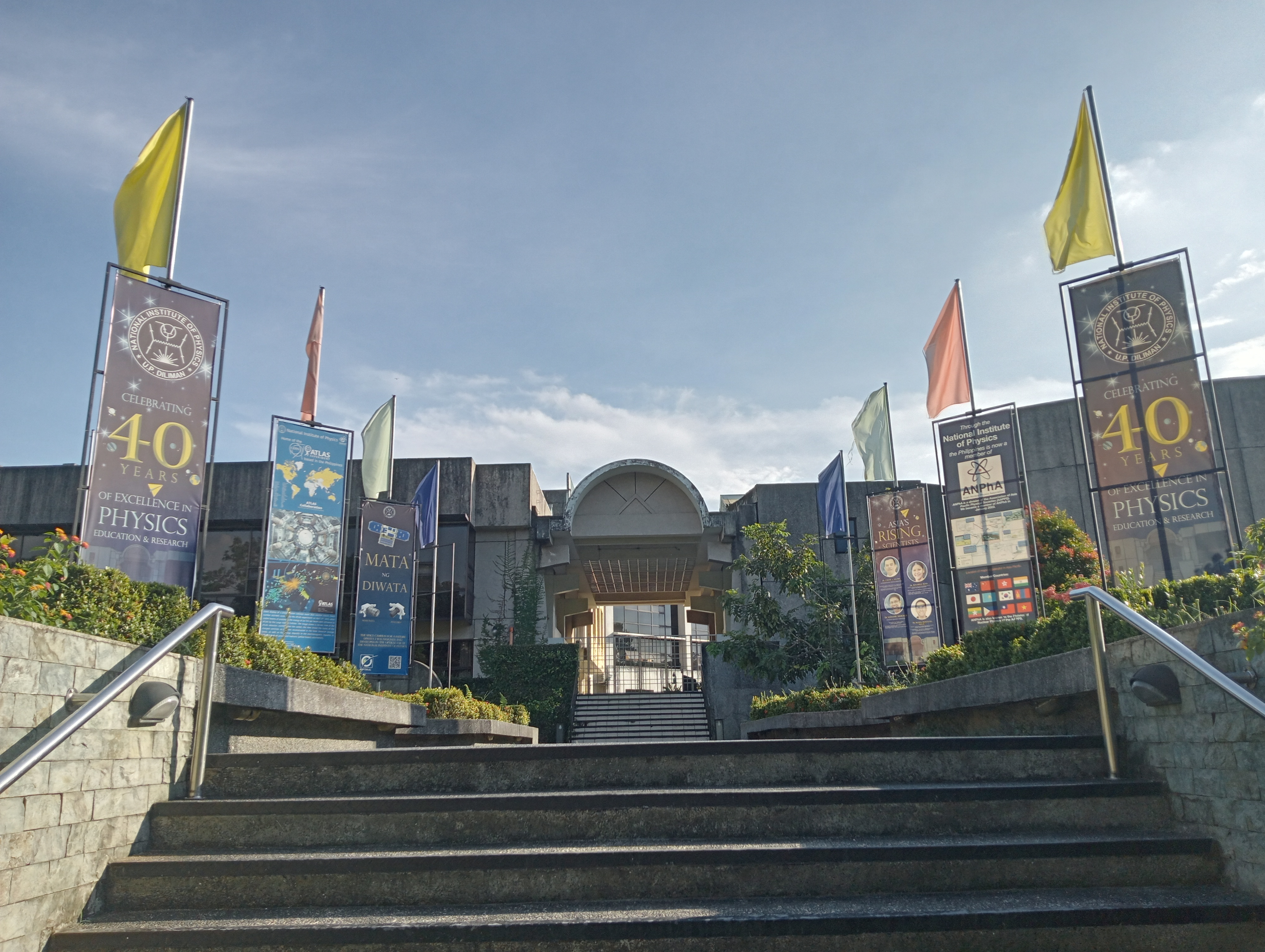
Entrance to the building

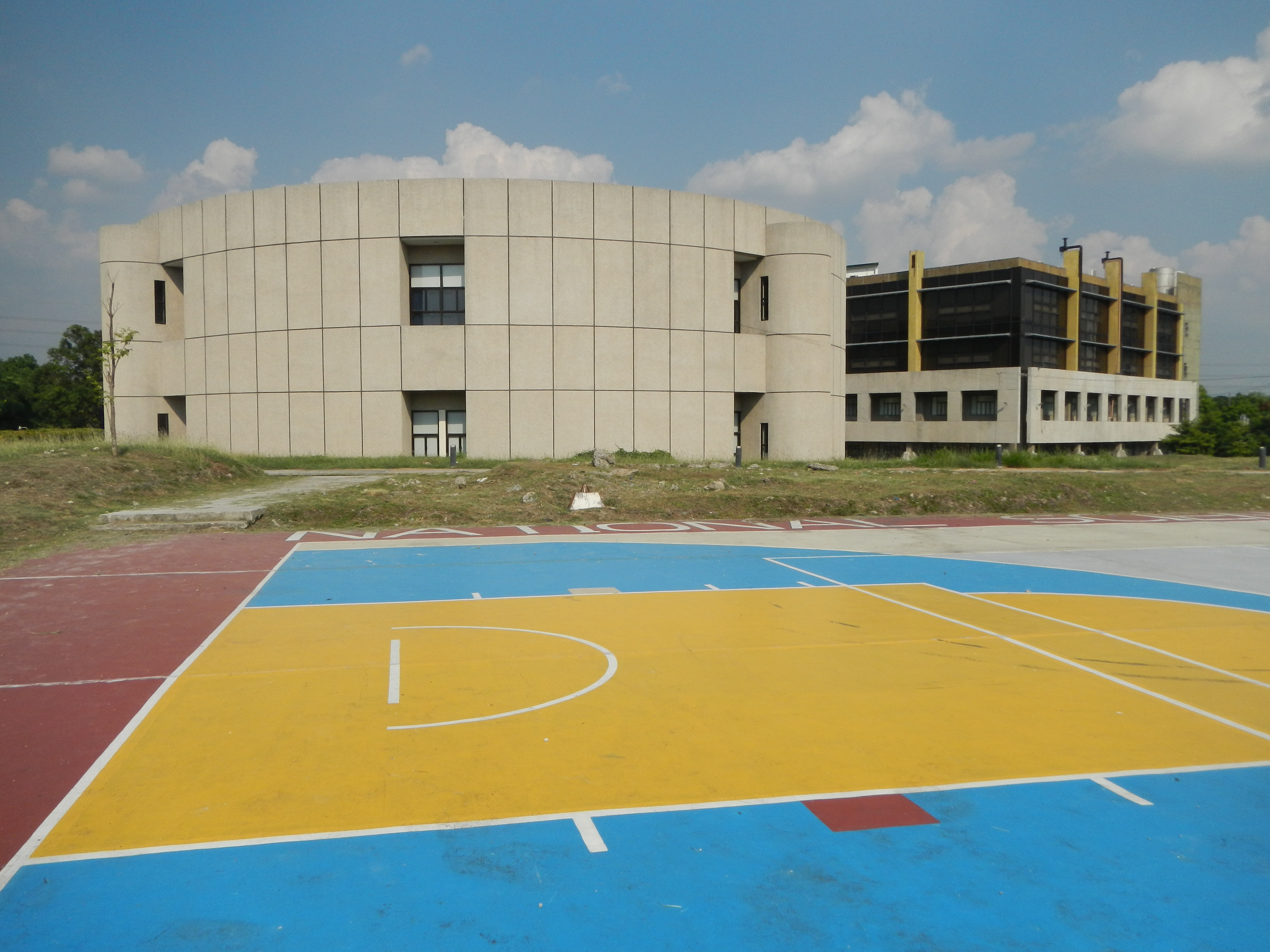
Facade

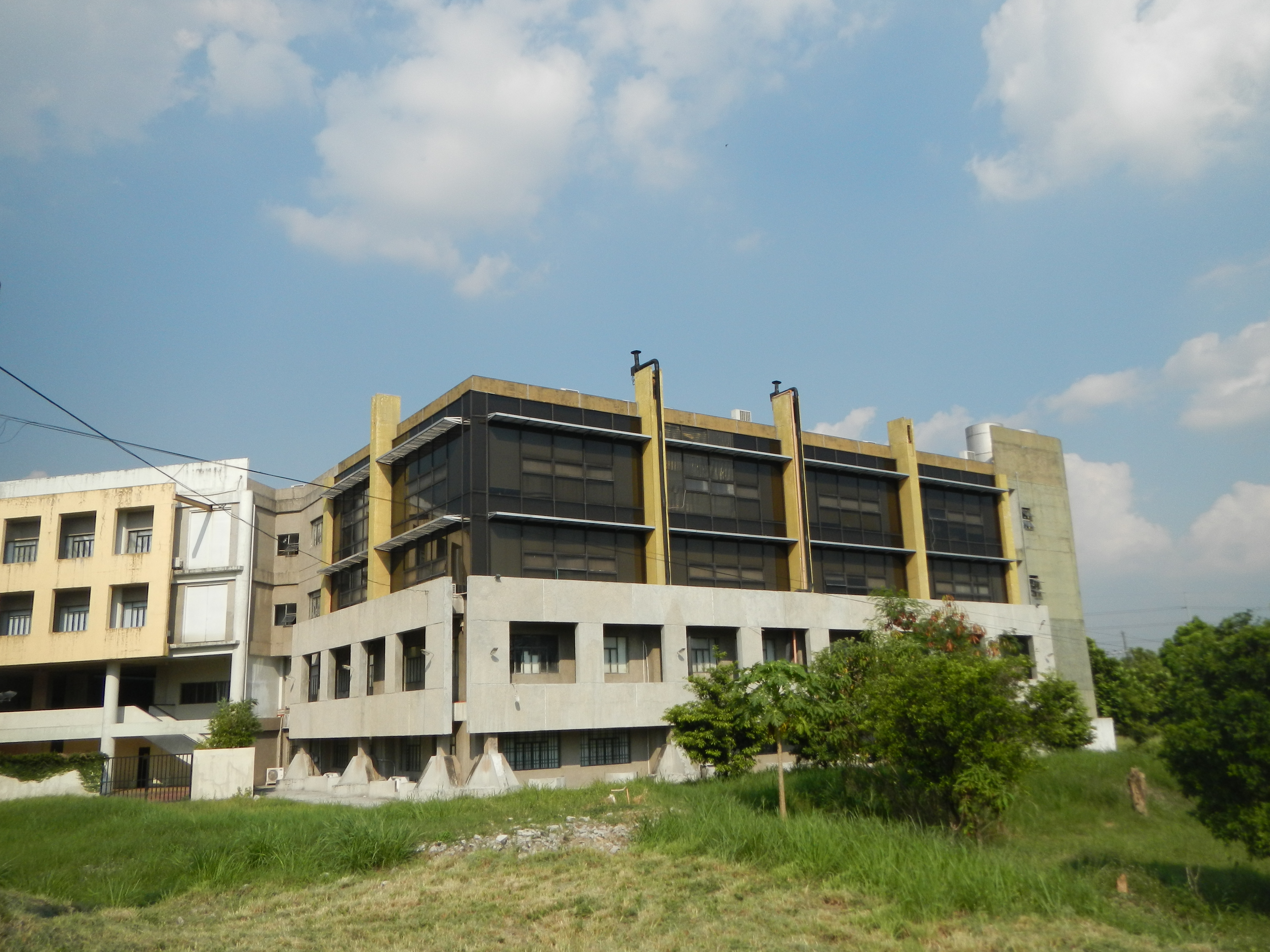
Research wing

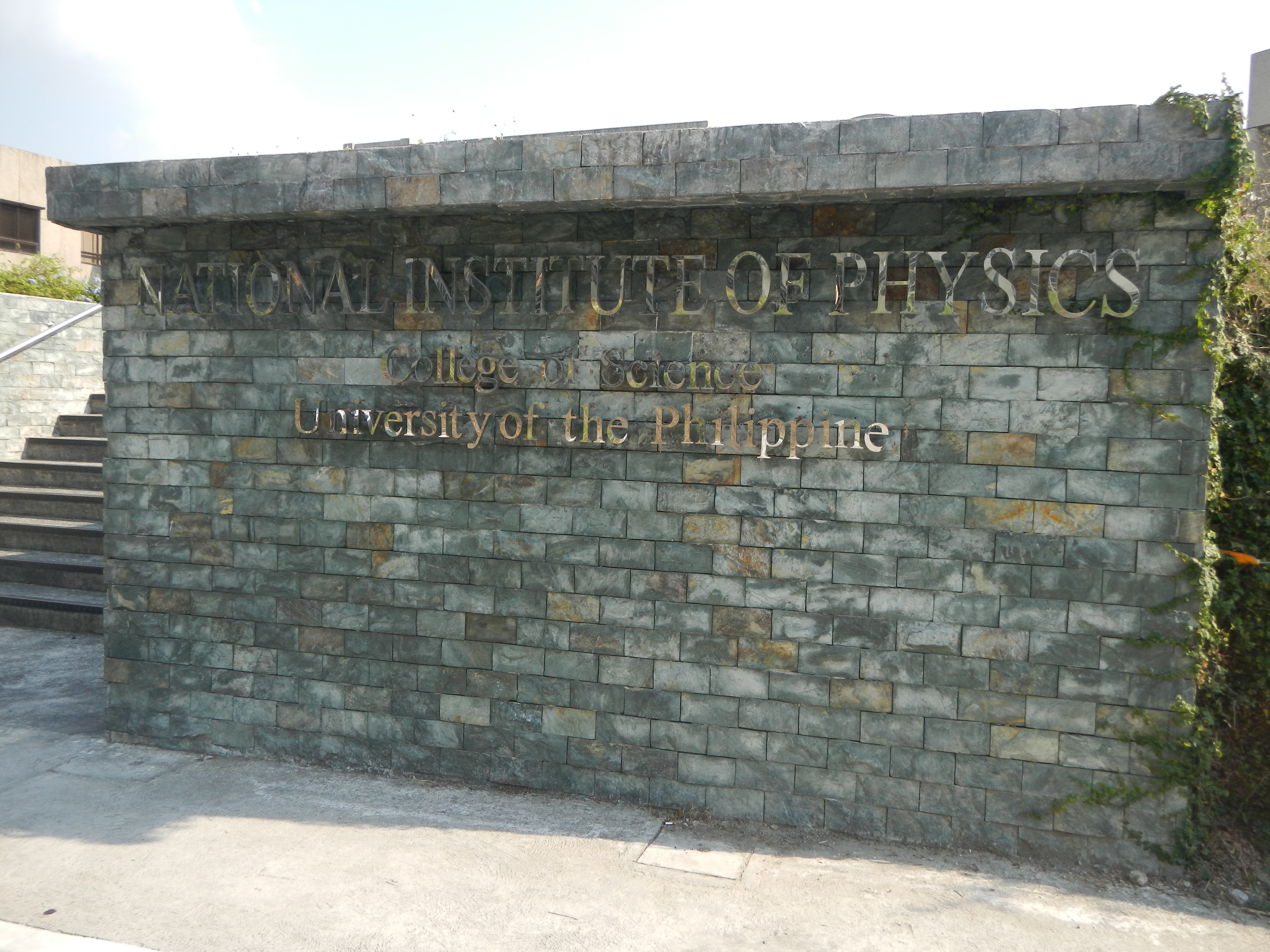
Inscription in front of the building
