= University of the Philippines College of Arts and Letters =

University of the Philippines Diliman - College of Arts and Letters
- Unibersidad ng Pilipinas Diliman - Kolehiyo ng Arte at Literatura
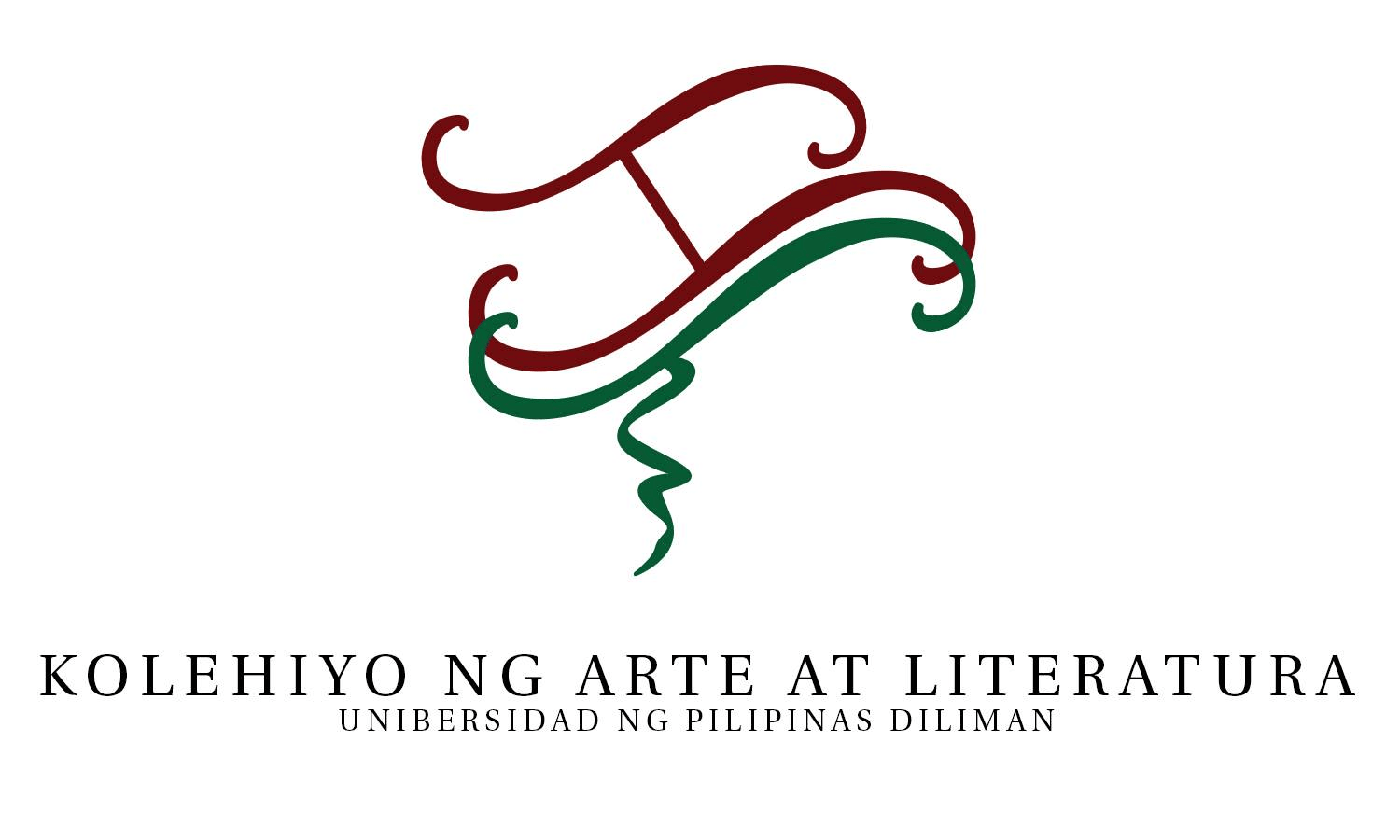
- Type: Public University; Research University; Degree-granting unit of the University of the Philippines Diliman
- Parent institution: University of the Philippines Diliman
- Dean: Jimmuel C. Naval
- Address: Pavilion 1, Palma Hall, Quirino Street, Diliman, Quezon City
- Website: https://www.kal.upd.edu.ph
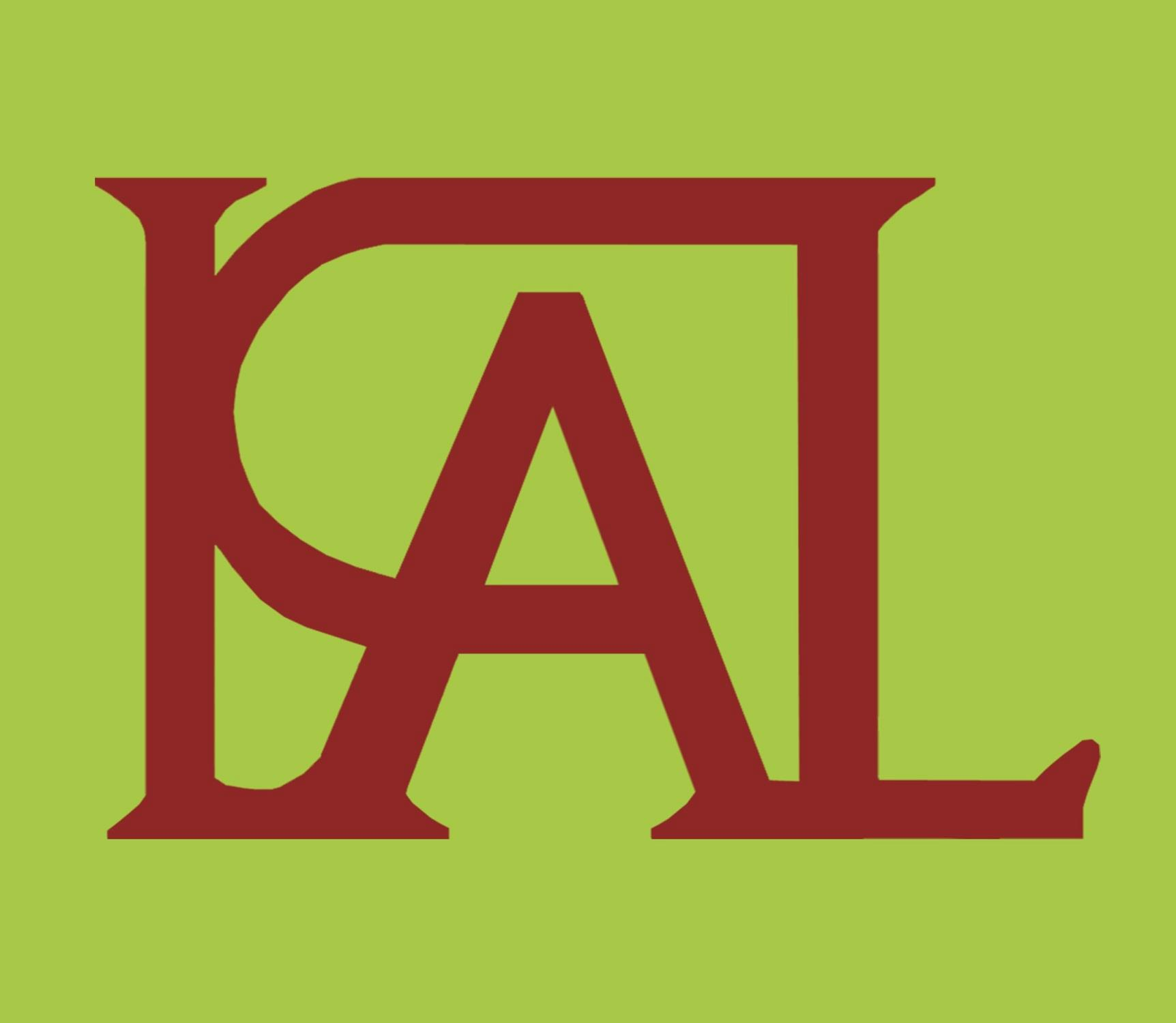

The University of the Philippines Diliman - College of Arts and Letters is a degree-granting unit of the University of the Philippines Diliman specializing in the humanities, with a special focus on arts studies, English and Filipino languages and literature, European languages, speech communication, and theater arts.

== Departments and Institutions ==
=== Departments ===
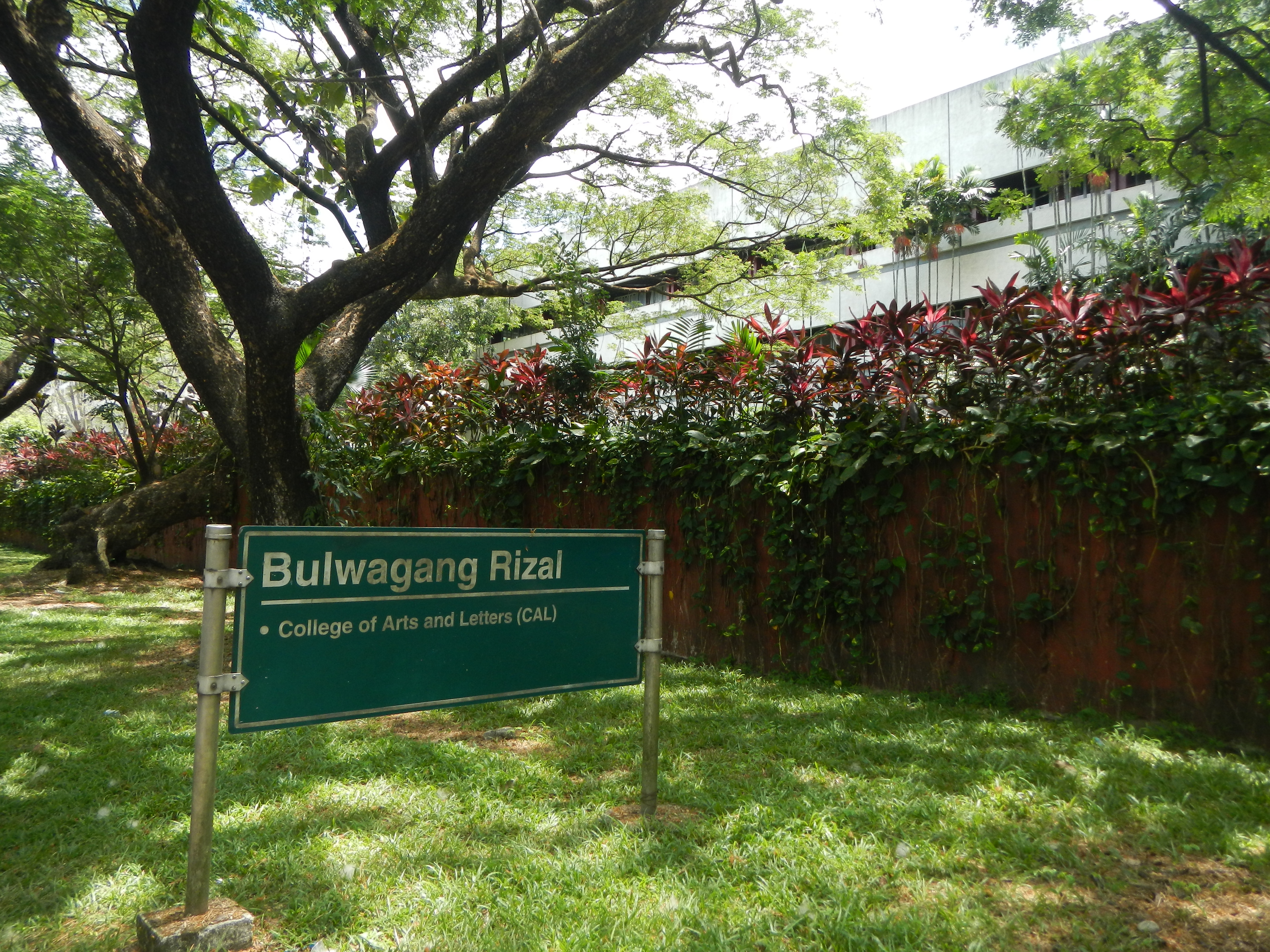
Bulwagang Rizal

Source: UP Diliman College of Arts and Letters

==== Department of Art Studies (DAS) ====
- BA Art Studies (Art History)
- BA Art Studies (Interdisciplinary)
- BA Art Studies (Philippine Art)
- MA Art Studies (Art History)
- MA Art Studies (Art Theory and Criticism)
- MA Art Studies (Curatorial Studies)

==== Department of English and Comparative Literature (DECL) ====
- BA Comparative Literature
- BA Creative Writing
- BA English Studies: Language
- BA English Studies: Literature
- MA (Comparative Literature)
- MA (Creative Writing)
- MA (English Studies: Anglo-American Literature)
- MA (English Studies: Language)
- PhD Comparative Literature
- PhD Creative Writing
- PhD English Studies: Language
- PhD English Studies: Anglo-American Literature

==== Department of European Languages (DEL) ====
- BA European Languages
  - Plan 1:
    - Major in French/Italian/German/Spanish
    - Minor in German/Russian/Italian/French/Portuguese/Spanish
  - Plan 2:
    - Major in French/Italian/German/Spanish
    - Minor in a non-EL discipline
      - English
      - Comparative Literature
      - Creative Writing
      - Filipino
      - Panitikan ng Pilipinas
      - Speech Communication
      - Theater Arts
      - Art Studies
      - Social Sciences
      - Philosophy
      - Theory in Fine Arts
      - Reading
      - Teaching in the Early Grades
      - Language Teaching
      - Communication Research
      - Tourism
- MA (French Language)
  - Areas of Concentration:
    - Language
    - Translation
- MA (German)
- MA (Spanish)
  - Areas of Concentration:
    - Language
    - Literature
    - Translation
    - Rizal Studies
- PhD (Hispanic Literature)
  - Areas of Specialization:
    - Spanish Filipino Literature
    - Spanish Peninsular Literature
    - Spanish American Literature

==== Departamento ng Filipino at Panitikan ng Pilipinas (DFPP) ====
- Asosyado sa Arte sa Malikhaing Pagsulat sa Filipino
- BA Malikhaing Pagsulat sa Filipino
- BA Filipino at Panitikan ng Pilipinas
- BA Philippine Studies (Araling Pilipino)
- MA (Araling Pilipino/Philippine Studies)
- MA Malikhaing Pagsulat
- MA (Filipino: Pagsasalin)
- MA Panitikan ng Pilipinas
- MA (Filipino: Wika)
- PhD Filipino (Istruktura ng Wikang Filipino)
- PhD Filipino (Pagsasalin)
- PhD Filipino (Pagpaplanong Pangwika)
- PhD Filipino Panitikan

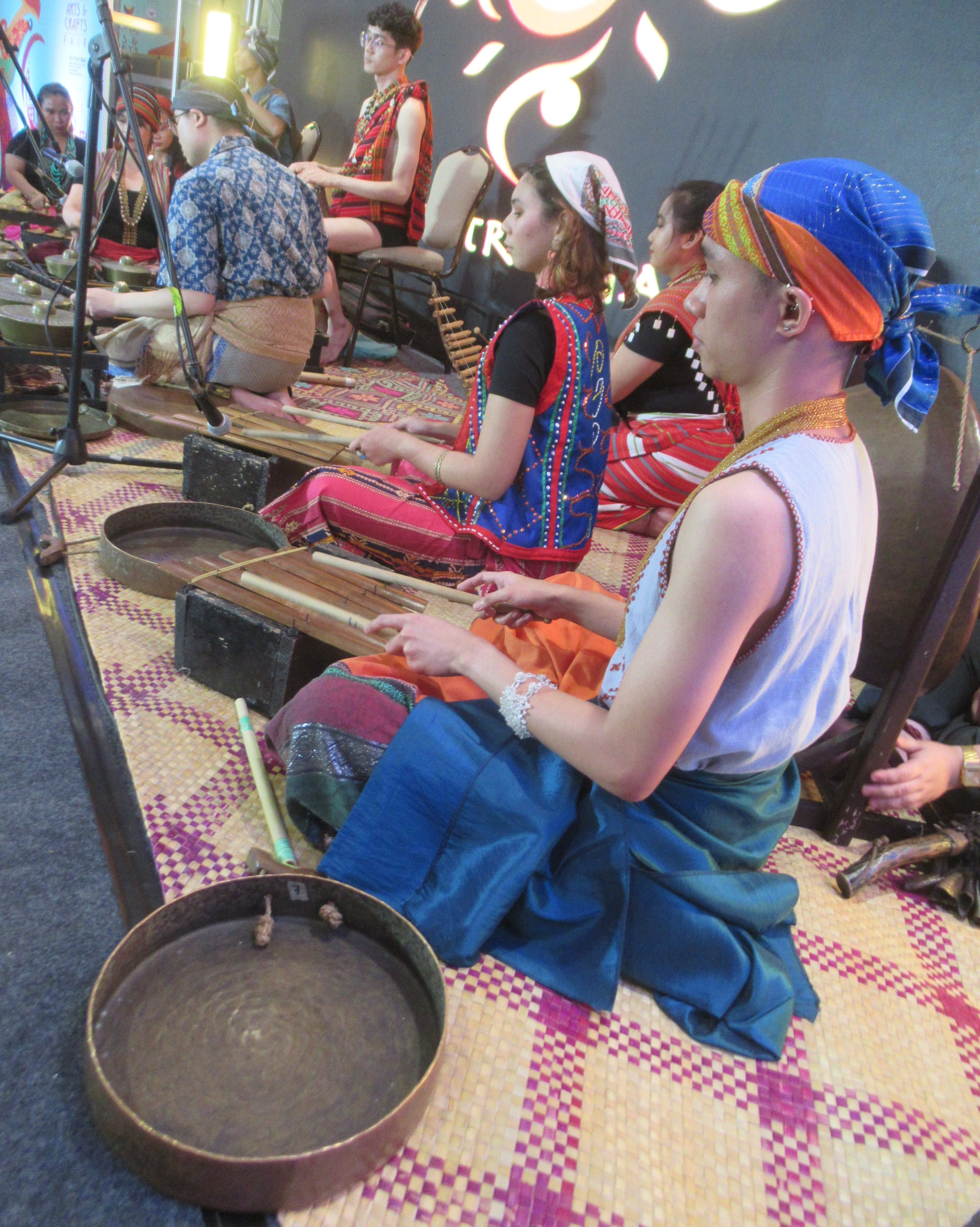
Kontra-Gapi, National Arts and Crafts Fair

==== Department of Speech Communication and Theatre Arts (DSCTA) ====
- Associate in Arts (Theatre)
- BA (Speech Communication)
- BA (Theatre Arts)
- MA (Speech Communication)
- MA (Theatre Arts)
- PhD Performance Studies

==== Tri-College ====
- PhD Philippine Studies Program
  - Offered jointly by the College of Arts and Letters, College of Social Science and Philosophy, and the Asian Center

=== Institutions ===
- LIKHAAN: Institute of Creative Writing (ICW)
- Dulaang Unibersidad ng Pilipinas (Dulaang UP)
- Vargas Museum
- Kontemporaryong Gamelan Pilipino (Kontra-GaPi) is the resident ethnic music and dance ensemble of the UP-College of Arts and Letters which is inspired by indigenous peoples of the Philippines culture and Gamelan in creating new music, dance and related arts - dance heard even as dance is music seen.
