= University of the Philippines Diliman =

Public university in Quezon City, Philippines

- Unibersidad ng Pilipinas Diliman (Filipino)
- Motto: Honor, Excellence, Service
- Type: National state university, research university
- Established: February 12, 1949 (transfer of main campus to Diliman)
- Academic affiliations: Association of Pacific Rim Universities; Association of Southeast Asian Institutions of Higher Learning; ASEAN European Academic University Network; ASEAN University Network
- Chancellor: Edgardo Carlo Vistan II
- President: Angelo Jimenez
- Faculty: 3,078 (2023)
- Students: 26,349 (2023)
- Undergraduates: 17,117 (2023)
- Postgraduates: 9,232 (2023)
- Location: Diliman, Quezon City, Philippines; 14°39′17.73″N 121°3′53.46″E
- Campus: Suburban
- Newspaper: Philippine Collegian
- Colors: UP Maroon UP Forest Green
- Nickname: Fighting Maroons
- Sporting affiliations: University Athletic Association of the Philippines
- Website: upd.edu.ph

The University of the Philippines Diliman (also known as UP Diliman or UPD; Filipino: Unibersidad ng Pilipinas Diliman) is a public research university located in Diliman, Quezon City, Philippines, and the flagship constituent university of the University of the Philippines (UP) System. Established in 1949 after most academic functions transferred from the Manila campus, it served as the main campus until the UP System was formed in 1972.

UP Diliman is the largest constituent campus in terms of the number of degree-granting academic units (27), student population (26,349, including 17,117 undergraduates), faculty (1,620, including 499 with doctoral degrees), and library resources. UP Diliman offers academic programs in 247 major fields, with 70 programs at the undergraduate level, 109 programs at the master's level, and 68 programs at the doctoral level.

In addition to the units on the main campus, UP Diliman has extension programs in Angeles City; Pampanga (the Clark Freeport Zone area); Olongapo in Zambales; a marine laboratory in Bolinao, Pangasinan under the Marine Science Institute; and a satellite campus at Bonifacio Global City, Taguig. The UP Diliman campus is also the site of the country's National Science Complex.

== History ==
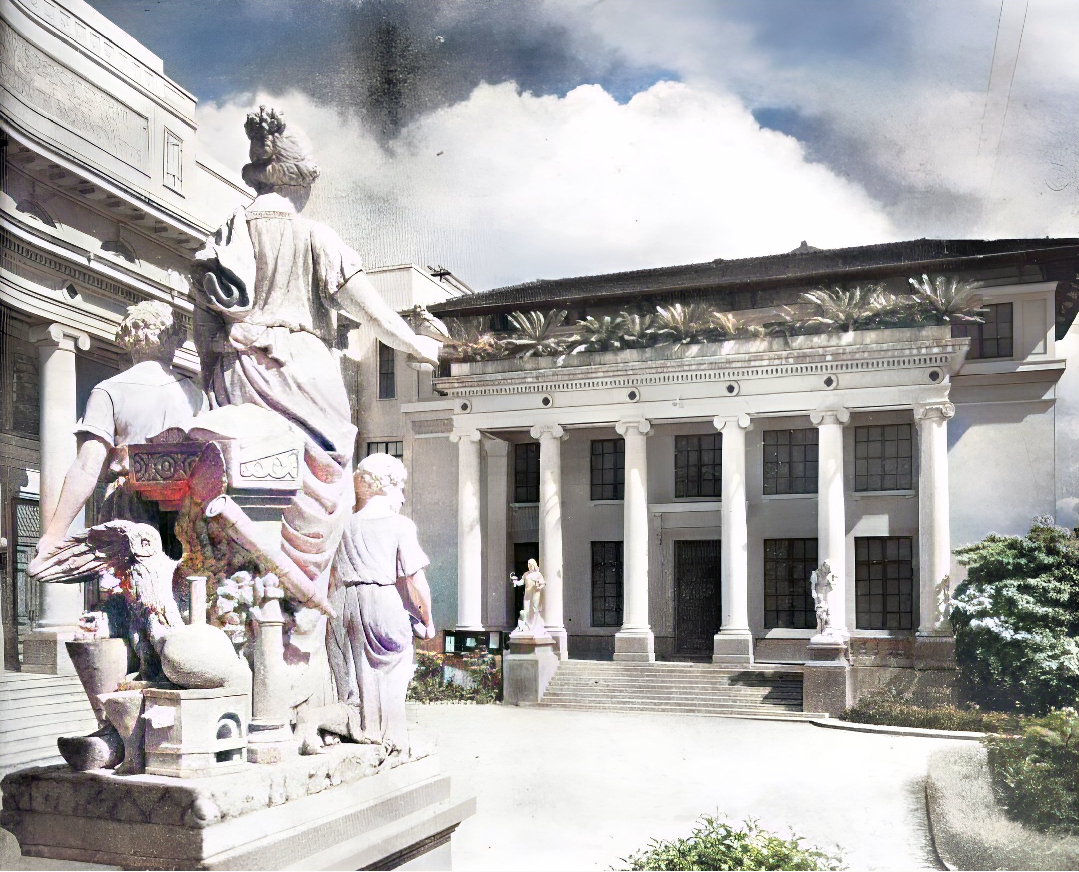
The first campus of the University of the Philippines, now University of the Philippines Manila

=== Establishment ===
The University of the Philippines was founded on June 18, 1908 in Manila, offering programs in liberal arts, medicine, law, and engineering. As enrolment increased from 67 students in 1908 to 7,849 in 1928 the need for a larger campus became evident, and in 1939 the UP Board of Regents acquired a 493-hectare tract of land in Diliman, Quezon City to house modern facilities that would allow for further academic growth and expansion.

Construction of the new campus commenced in 1939 but work was interrupted by World War II, when many of the newly constructed buildings were used as barracks by the Imperial Japanese Army, delaying the relocation efforts. Following the liberation of Manila in 1945 efforts to rebuild and expand the campus resumed, and by 1949 significant progress allowed for the transfer of administrative offices, academic units, and faculty residences from UP Manila to UP Diliman. On February 12, 1949 a symbolic motorcade led by then-UP President Bienvenido Gonzales transported the Oblation statue from Padre Faura Street in Manila to its current location in front of Quezon Hall, marking the formal establishment of UP Diliman as the new primary campus of the UP System.

Throughout the 1950s and 1960s UP Diliman expanded its facilities, establishing new academic buildings, research centers, and residential areas. This period saw the construction of several architecturally significant structures, including Quezon Hall (Administration Building), Gonzalez Hall (Main Library), and Benitez Hall (College of Education), designed by National Artist for Architecture Juan Nakpil. Other modernist structures such as Palma Hall (College of Social Sciences and Philosophy) and Melchor Hall (College of Engineering) were designed by Cesar Concio, reflecting the post-war shift toward functionalist and modernist architecture.

=== Diliman Commune ===
The Diliman Commune was a significant student-led uprising that occurred from February 1–9, 1971 at the University of the Philippines Diliman campus. Initially sparked by a three-centavo increase in oil prices, the protest escalated following violent confrontations with government forces, resulting in the death of the student Pastor "Sonny" Mesina. In response, students, faculty members, and residents established barricades around the campus, effectively declaring it a "liberated zone" free from military intrusion. Drawing inspiration from the 1871 Paris Commune, the protesters referred to themselves as "Communards" and renamed the campus the "Malayang Komunidad ng UP Diliman" ("Free Commune of UP Diliman"). They also took control of the university's radio station, DZUP, and published their own newspaper, Bandilang Pula ("Red Flag").

=== Institutional autonomy ===
The Management Review Committee (MRC) was created by UP President Edgardo Angara in the 1980s to evaluate and recommend measures for the University of the Philippines' improvement. The report made by the MRC led to the decision of the Board of Regents to further decentralize the UP administration, declaring UP Diliman an autonomous unit on March 23, 1983. This also furthered the reorganization of some major units of the university, with the College of Arts and Sciences being split into three colleges: the College of Science; the College of Arts and Letters; and the College of Social Sciences and Philosophy. In response to this restructuring, UP Diliman was granted institutional autonomy, retroactive to 1981, and formally established as a constituent university on April 23, 1985 at the 976th Meeting of the UP Board of Regents.

== Campus layout ==
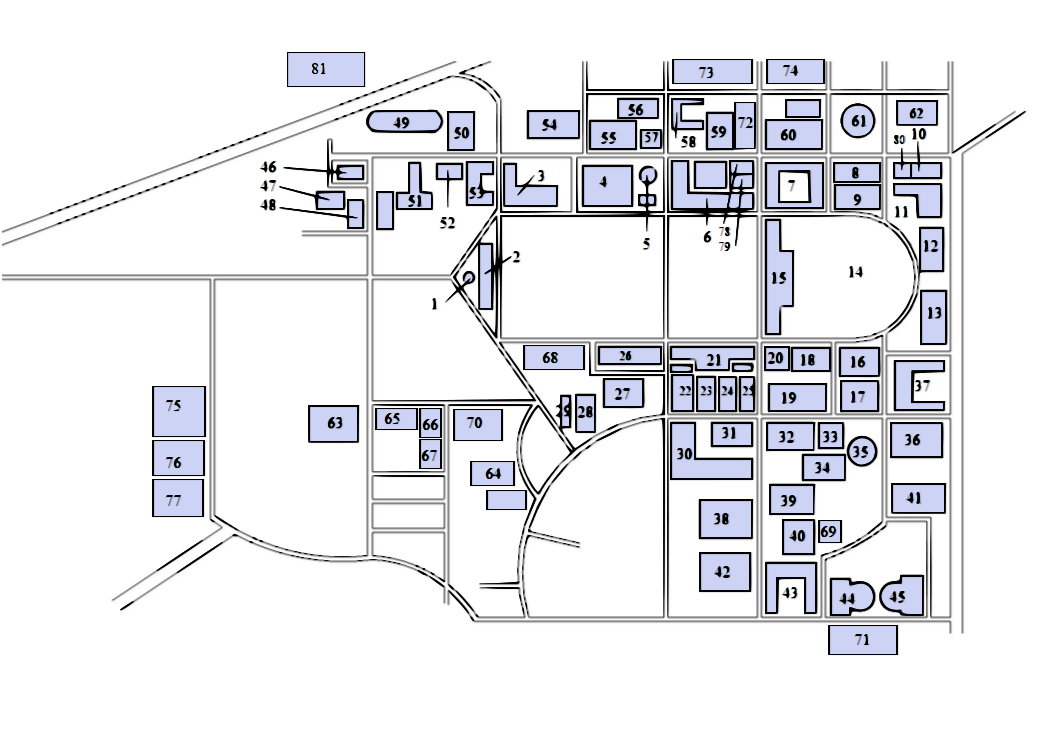
Map of the main area of the University of the Philippines Diliman

The UP Diliman campus spans 493 hectares in Quezon City and serves as the UP system's administrative and academic center, housing the offices of the UP President and Chancellor. The campus is connected to Commonwealth Avenue via University Avenue, which stretches 800 meters (2,600 ft) from where traffic enters the campus to where Oblation Plaza faces the road.

At the centre of the campus is the Academic Oval – informally known as "Acad Oval" – a loop of 2.2 kilometers (1.4 mi) lined with about 500 acacia and fir trees that defines the university's academic and administrative district and connects with the rest of the colleges on University Avenue. It is the main and largest road in the university and is composed of the joining Roxas and Osmeña Avenues. The left side is reserved as a pedestrian and bicycle lane and painted in the official colors of the university, while the right side is for vehicles going one way counter clockwise. It derives its name from the colleges located around it: the College of Media and Communication; College of Music; College of Science; College of Engineering; College of Law; School of Economics; College of Business Administration; College of Education; College of Social Sciences and Philosophy; and School of Library and Information Studies. Also along the Academic Oval axis are Quezon Hall, the university's main administration building; Gonzalez Hall, the University Library; Benitez Hall and Malcolm Hall, housing the College of Education and College of Law respectively; the UP Theater; the Student Activity Center/Vinzons Hall; and the Center for International Studies.

Beyond the Academic Oval UP Diliman extends into distinct academic clusters, research hubs, residential zones, and open spaces that balance the built and natural environments. To the east, the National Science Complex (NSC) and Engineering Complex house state-of-the-art Science, Technology, Engineering, and Mathematics (STEM) research facilities. The southern sector features cultural institutions such as the UP Film Institute, Jorge B. Vargas Museum, and Abelardo Hall.

== Architectural features ==
=== The Oblation ===
The Oblation (Tagalog: Pahinungod/Oblasyon) is a statue originally created in 1935 by National Artist Guillermo E. Tolentino in a collective effort with students, and is an iconic figure of the UP System. Originally made of concrete, the Oblation stands 3.5 meters (11 ft) in height and was originally nude. For morality and censorship purposes, UP President Jorge Bocobo suggested covering the genitals with a fig leaf. In 1950 the Board of Regents ordered the statue to be cast in bronze, with Tolentino making a trip to Italy to personally supervise the casting of his old masterpiece.

During the 40th anniversary of the University of the Philippines in 1949, the Oblation was transferred to Diliman from its original site on Padre Faura Street in Manila as a symbol of transfer of the university's administrative seat. Unveiled on November 29, 1958, the bronze statue is now housed at Gonzalez Hall, where the University Library is also located.

=== Benitez and Malcolm Halls ===
Benitez Hall and Malcolm Hall are two of the oldest and most architecturally significant buildings on the UP Diliman campus, standing as neoclassical mirror images of each other at the head of the Academic Oval. Designed by Juan Marcos Arellano y de Guzmán, their construction began in 1939 and was completed between 1941 and 1949.

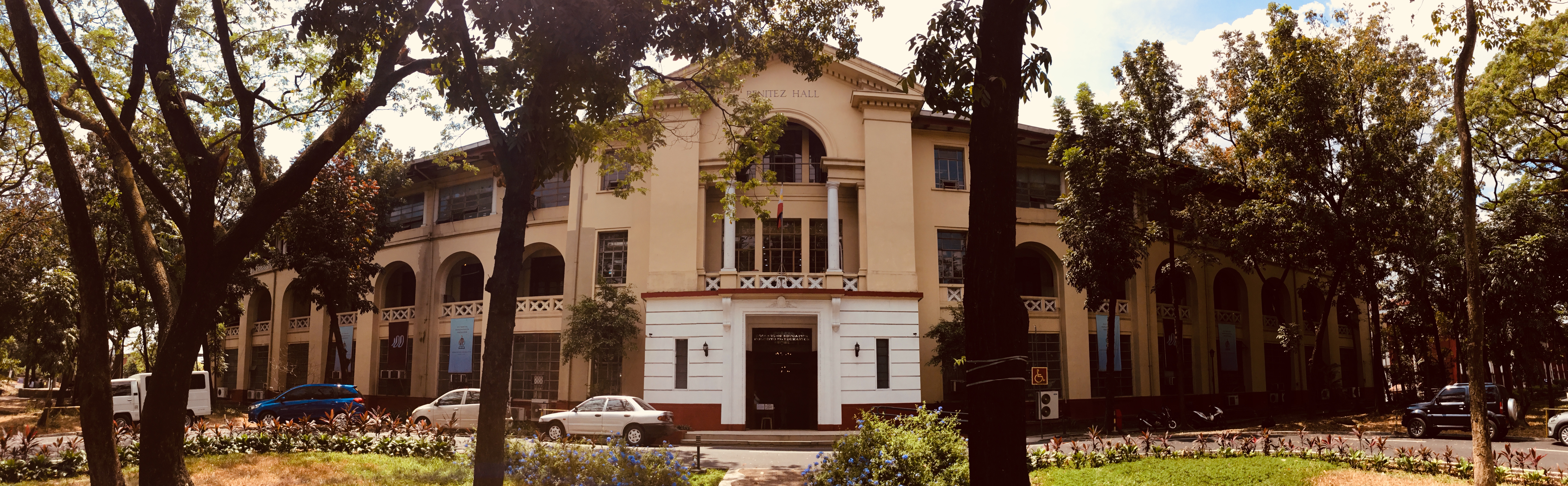
Benitez Hall, home of the College of Education

Benitez Hall is home to the College of Education and is named after Francisco F. Benitez, the first dean of the School of Education. Its design features a balanced facade with a prominent pediment and pilastered entrance, reinforcing its function as a center of learning and teacher training. During World War II the building was repurposed as a military quarters by Japanese forces and was reportedly the site of wartime atrocities, leading to persistent claims of paranormal activity within its halls.

Standing directly across from Benitez Hall, Malcolm Hall houses the College of Law and is named after George Malcolm, a former Associate Justice of the Philippine Supreme Court and the founding dean of the College of Law. As a mirror image of Benitez Hall, Malcolm Hall exhibits the same neoclassical symmetry, with its tall Corinthian columns and arched windows.

=== Palma Hall ===
Palma Hall is informally known as "AS" (for "Arts and Sciences)", and serves as the main building of the College of Social Sciences and Philosophy. It was named after Rafael Palma, the fourth president of the university, who was a staunch advocate of academic freedom and liberalism. Designed by the university's first campus architect Cesar Homero Rosales Concio, it was completed in 1951.

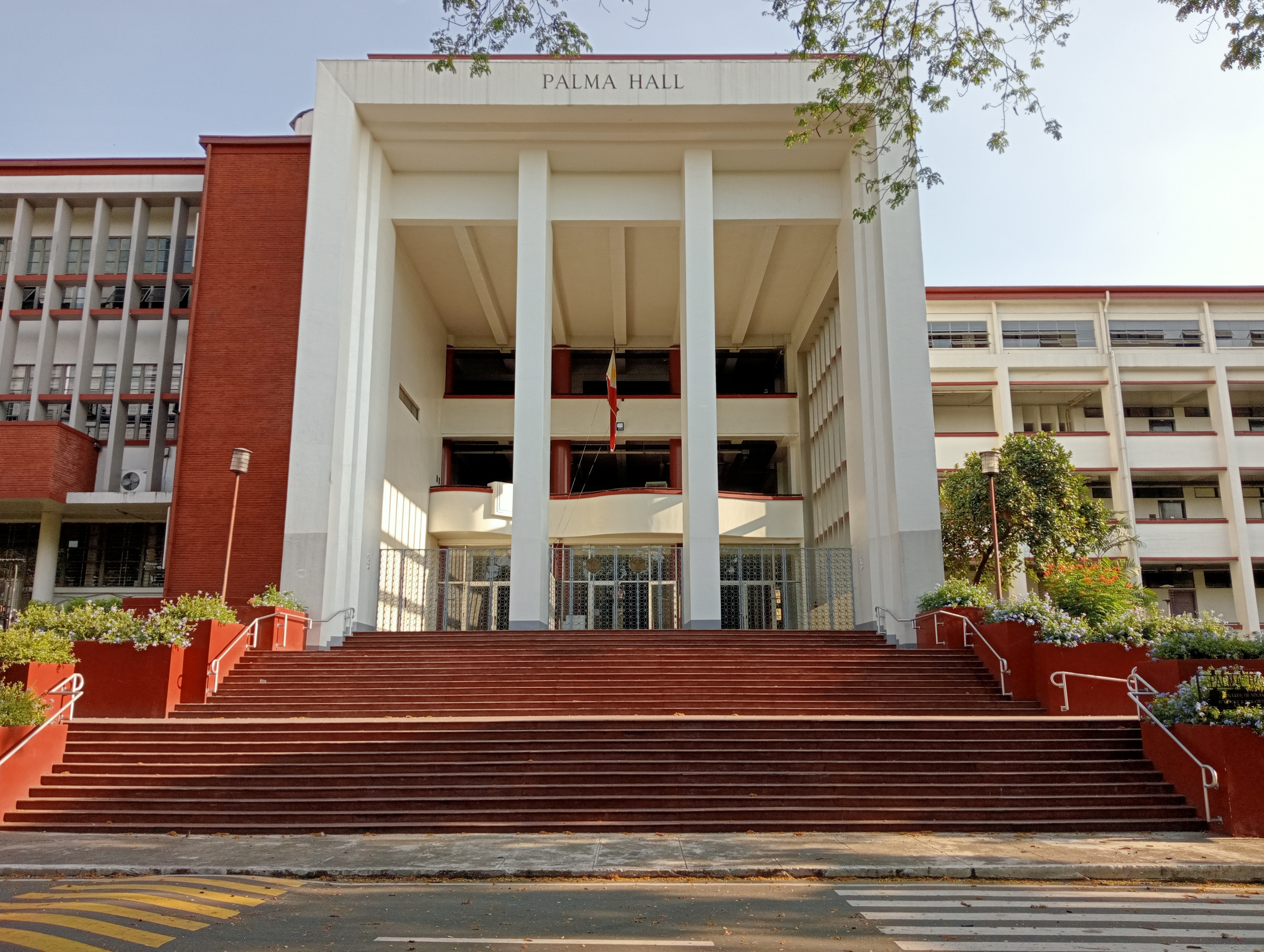
The historic facade of Palma Hall and the AS Steps, a central landmark of UP Diliman and known as a gathering place for student demonstrations and political activism

Palma Hall exemplifies the International Style of architecture, characterized by functional design and minimalist aesthetics, and the building is also distinguished by its exposed concrete framework, horizontal louvres, and cantilevered balconies. Concio incorporated Filipino architectural elements such as asymmetrical layout and open-air corridors to enhance natural ventilation and lighting, making the structure well-adapted to the tropical climate at the same time as reflecting modernist architectural trends.

=== Gonzalez Hall ===
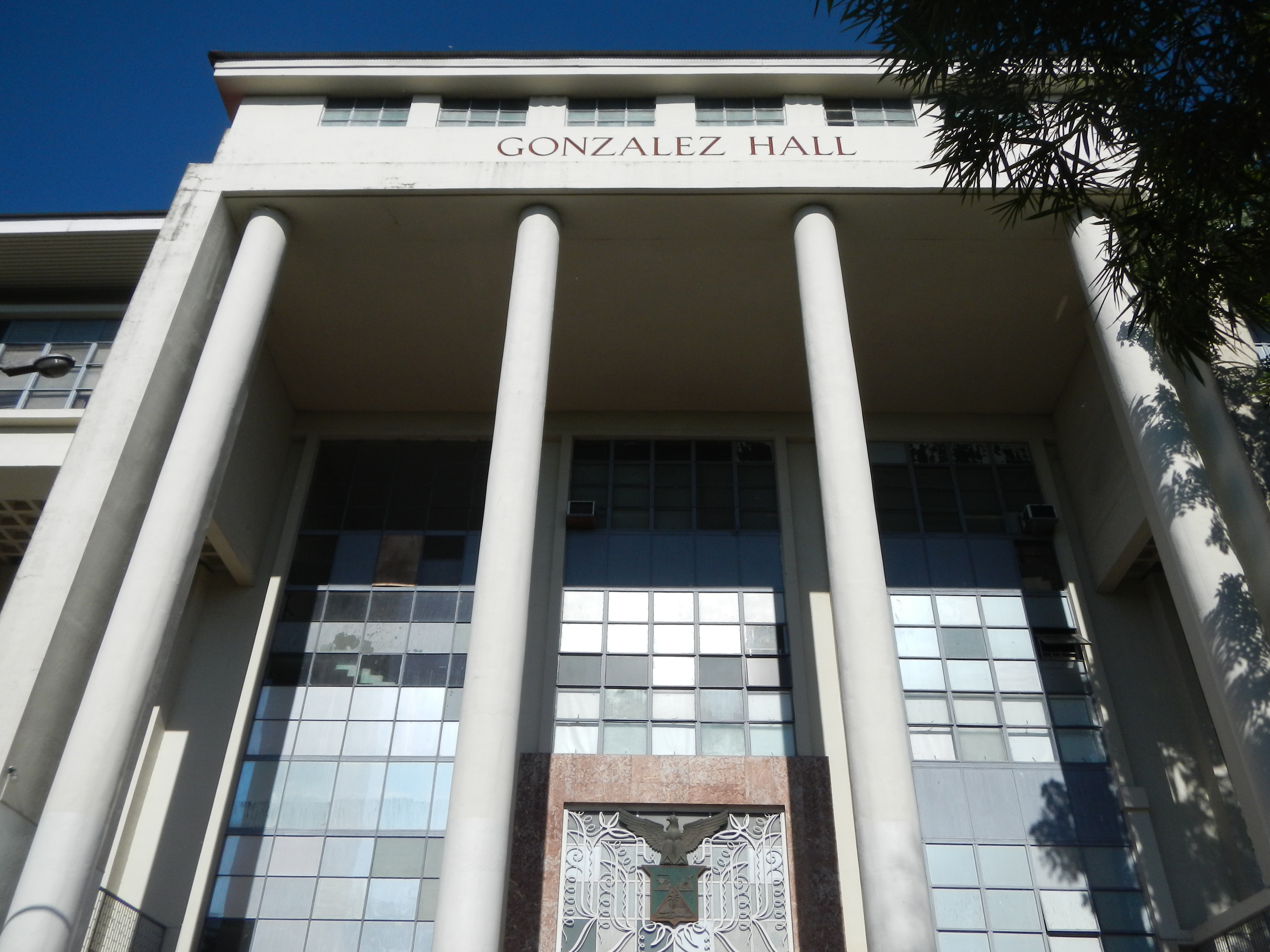
Gonzalez Hall, Main Library

Gonzalez Hall houses the University Main Library and was designed by National Artist for Architecture Juan Nakpil and completed in 1950. It was named after Bienvenido M. Gonzalez, the university's sixth president, and was part of the post-war expansion that established UP Diliman as the seat of administration of the University of the Philippines system. The building embodies neoclassical architectural principles, characterized by its grand facade, symmetrical proportions, and columns.

The Main Library inside Gonzalez Hall serves as the central repository for academic and research materials, and houses extensive collections, archives, and special publications.

=== Parish of the Holy Sacrifice ===
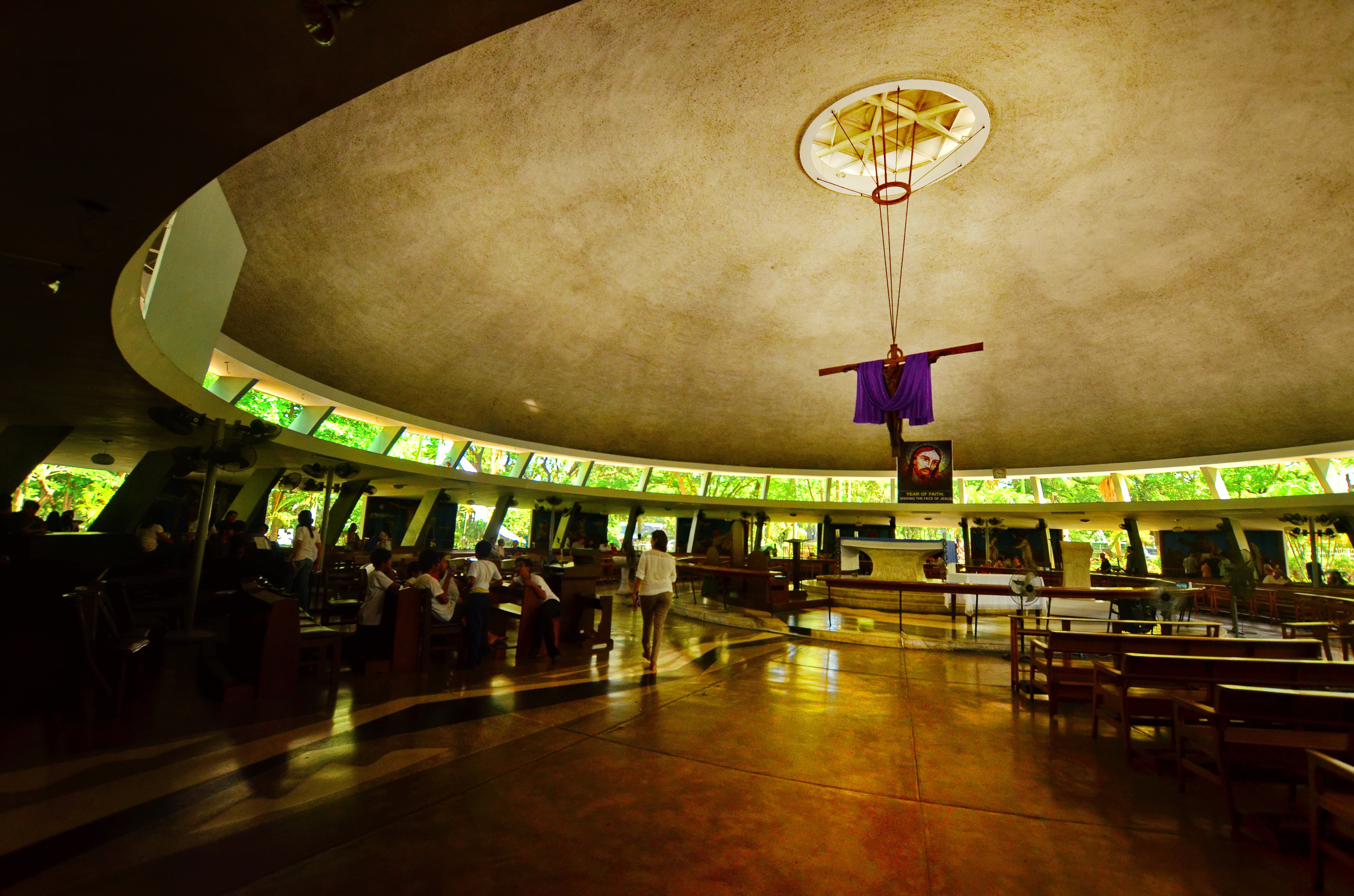
Parish of the Holy Sacrifice

The Parish of the Holy Sacrifice, commonly known as the UP Chapel, is a Catholic chapel designed by National Artist for Architecture Leandro V. Locsin and completed in 1955. With the altar placed at the center it is recognized as the first circular church in the Philippines and the first structure in the country to feature a thin-shell concrete dome, with the design allowing natural light to enhance the interior's serene and contemplative atmosphere.

The chapel contains works by a number of National Artists: Arturo Luz (floor mosaic); Vicente Manansala and Ang Kiukok (15 Stations of the Cross murals); and Napoleon Abueva (crucifix and altar). The National Historical Commission of the Philippines (NHCP) has declared it a National Historical Landmark and the National Museum has recognized it as a Cultural Treasure.

=== Carillon Tower ===
The UP Carillon Tower is about 130 feet tall and was originally conceived in 1940 by National Artist Juan Nakpil, Conservatory of Music director Ramon Tapales, and UP President Bienvenido Gonzales, who had the idea of building a concrete structure that would tower over the grounds of the university. The tower was finished on August 1, 1952 and dedicated as the UP Carillon, the only carillon in Southeast Asia that is played manually on a wooden clavier keyboard. Forty-eight bells ranging over four octaves were installed by the Dutch carillonneur Adrian Antonisse after being forged by Van Bergen Co. in the Netherlands, with the largest weighing five tons. The total cost of construction was ₱200,000.

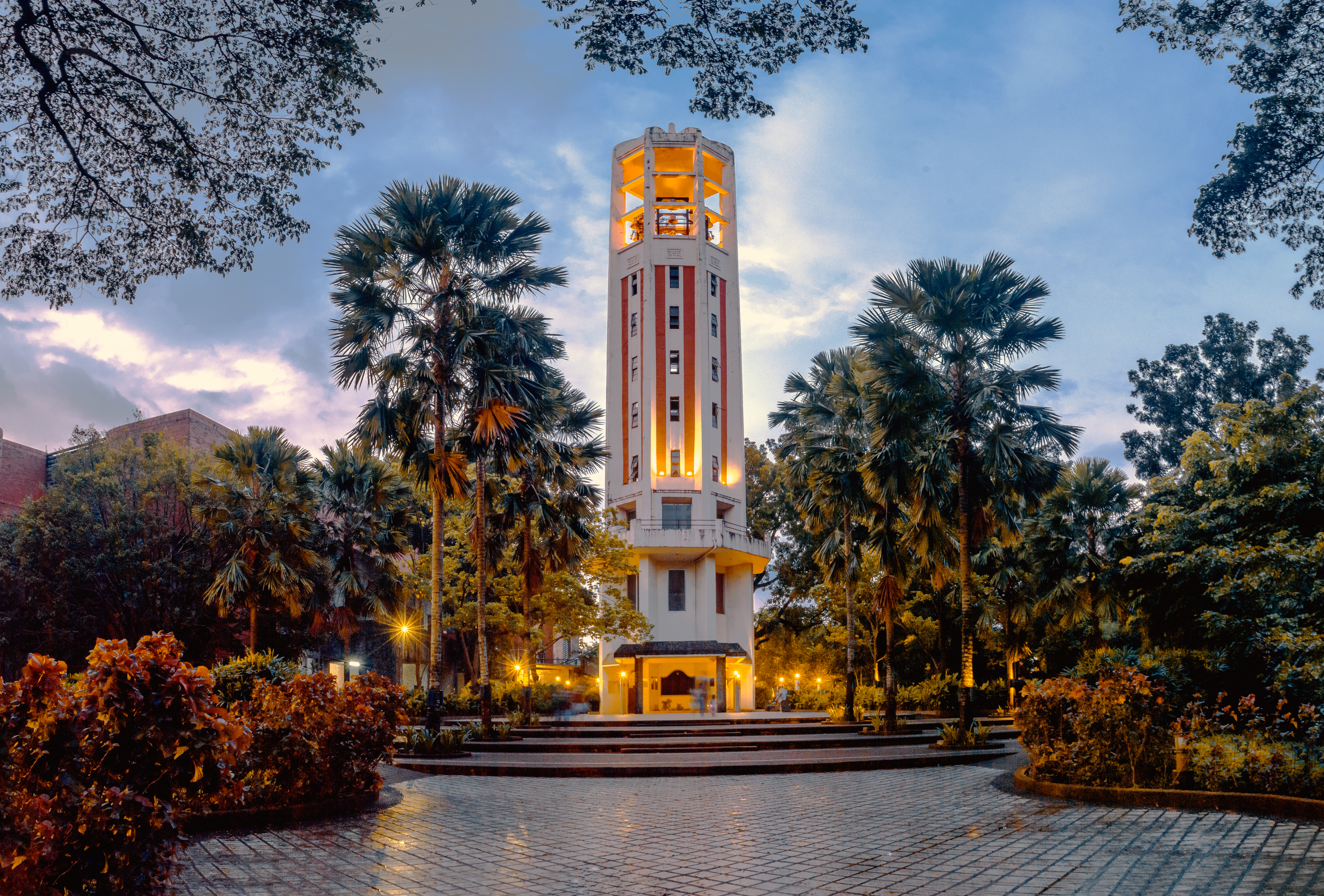
The Carillon Tower and Carillon Plaza as seen from Magsaysay Avenue

Apart from playing the UP anthem "UP Naming Mahal" ("UP Beloved"), the carillon played a range of other music such as the "Magtanim ay Di Biro" ("Planting Rice", a Filipino folk song) and Beatles songs. During the 1971 Diliman Commune when UP students declared the university a republic separate from the Philippines, the carillon played the socialist anthem "The Internationale". However, due to age and rust the carillon ceased to play in 1981, although in 1988 "UP Naming Mahal" and "Push On UP!" (UP Diliman's athletic cheer) were played from the tower during the December Lantern Parade, and as late as 2001 students said that they could hear "London Bridge Is Falling Down" and "Sing a Song of Sixpence", despite the Carillon having been closed to prevent further mishap.

The UP Carillon Restoration Project of the UP Centennial Commission launched a fundraising program in 2005 aiming to collect ₱20 million to restore the carillon for use in the upcoming 100th year of the University of the Philippines. After two years and through the collective efforts of the UP Alumni Association and various private donors, the project was able to collect ₱14 million to be used to clean up and repair the tower and to replace the bells. The original 48 bells were archived and were replaced by 36 bells with a three octave range bought from the Dutch company Petit & Fritsen for ₱12 million, with construction engineering provided by the Royal Bell Philippines. Each bell consisted of 80% bronze and 20% an admixture of zinc, magnesium and phosphorus, with the largest of the bells weighing 635 kilograms (1,400 lb) and the smallest 14 kilograms (31 lb). The original wood claviers were replaced by heavy-duty oakwood, with all the bells designed to hold refurbished steel pipes as well as be programmed using computers attached to the clavier.

A small amphitheatre named Carillon Plaza was constructed at the base of the tower, and after about two decades of silence and two years of restoration the UP Carillon was heard again during the 2007 Lantern Parade.

=== Sunken Garden ===
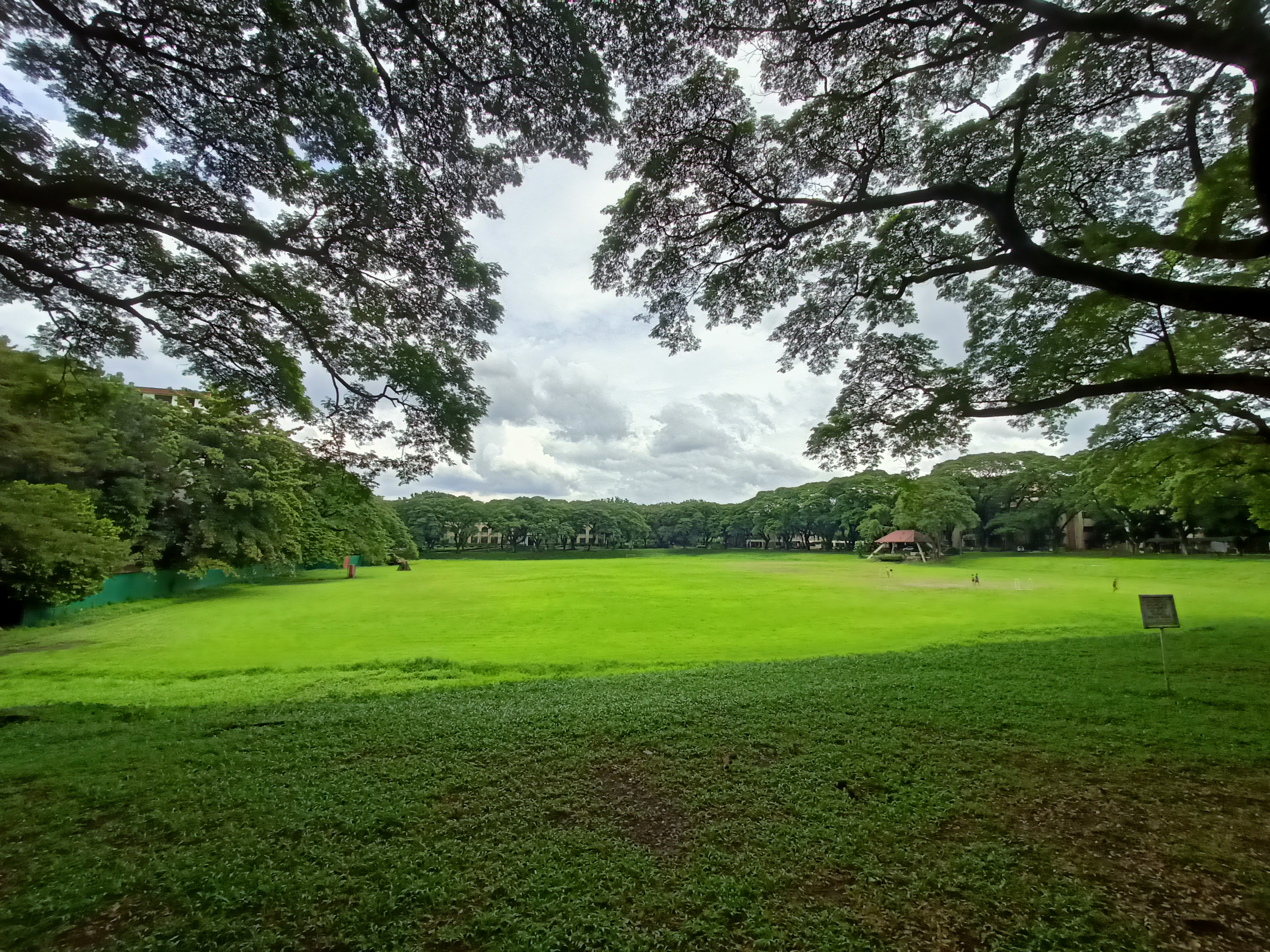
The Sunken Garden in UP Diliman during the wet months

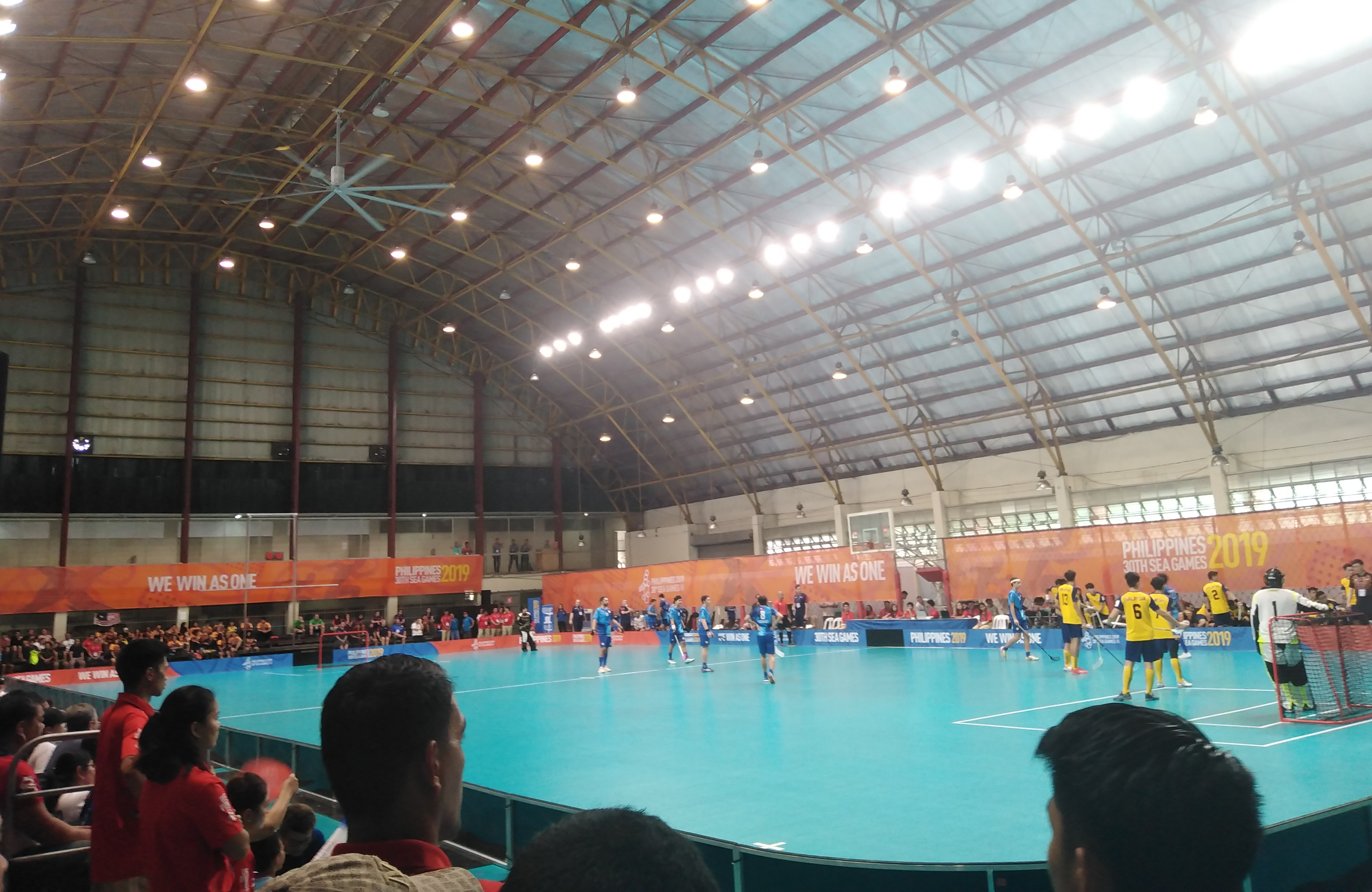
UP College of Human Kinetics Gymnasium

The General Antonio Luna Parade Grounds, commonly known as the Sunken Garden, is a 5-hectare (12-acre) natural depression on the eastern side of the campus at the end of the Academic Oval circle. Originally the property of the UP Reserve Officers' Training Corps when the campus was founded in 1949, the Sunken Garden is surrounded by the UP Main Library, the College of Social Sciences and Philosophy's Department of Psychology, the College of Education, the Student Activity Center/Vinzons Hall, the College of Business Administration, the School of Economics, and the College of Law.

The Sunken Garden acquired its name due to its basin-shaped low-level formation that at its deepest point is only 65 meters above sea level, contrasting with the university's overall height of over hundreds of meters above sea level. According to local lore the Sunken Garden sinks by about two inches every year, although this has not been verified in any study. Posited reasons for the sinking include that it is because of underground trenches over the campus' sewer system that connect to the Marikina Fault Line, an active geological structure that runs across the east of Metro Manila. Another theory is that the depression was formed due to the emptying of former streams that were prominent in the 1950s. These streams used to run from Katipunan Avenue, through the garden itself, and then leave the campus for Commonwealth Avenue.

The Sunken Garden is the venue of the annual UP Fair as well as being used for sports tournaments including football, frisbee, and volleyball. The Department of Military Science and Tactics also holds training sessions in the area.

=== Sports complex ===
The Sports Complex consists of various sports venues including an indoor gymnasium, a 50-meter (160 ft) swimming pool, a four-court tennis area, a track and field oval, a baseball diamond, a football pitch, and an archery range. These facilities are used by students of the university including members of the UP Fighting Maroons, and are also rented out for use by outsiders. In 2019, the gymnasium hosted the floorball competition of the 2019 SEA Games.

== Administration ==
Chancellors of the
University of the Philippines Diliman
Edgardo J. Angara, LL.M., 1982–1983 (Note: Concurrent President of the University of the Philippines from 1981 to 1987)
Dr. Ernesto G. Tabujara Sr., 1983–1990
Dr. Jose V. Abueva, 1990–1991 (Note: Concurrent President of the University of the Philippines from 1987 to 1993)
Dr. Emerlinda R. Roman, 1991–1993
Dr. Roger Posadas,1993–1996
Dr. Claro T. Llaguno, 1996–1999
Dr. Emerlinda R. Roman, 1999–2005
Dr. Sergio S. Cao, 2005–2011
Dr. Caesar A. Saloma, 2011–2014
Dr. Michael L. Tan, 2014–2020
Dr. Fidel R. Nemenzo, 2020–2023
Edgardo Carlo Vistan II, 2023–present

UP Diliman is the fourth oldest of the seven major campuses of the University of the Philippines and the largest in terms of student population. The University of the Philippines is governed by the eleven members of the Board of Regents, of whom five are ex officio, three are student, faculty, and staff representatives, and three are appointed by the President of the Philippines.

Each campus of the University of the Philippines is headed by a chancellor. The first chancellor of UP Diliman was Senator Edgardo J. Angara, whose office was created on April 26, 1982, and the current chancellor is Edgardo Carlo Vistan II, who was appointed by the Board of Regents during its meeting in April 2023. Apart from heading the university the chancellor also holds administrative duties that represent the Board of Regents at the campus level, as well as serving as chairperson of the university council, an internal coordinating body composed of the chancellor himself, the university registrar (who serves as secretary), and the professorial faculty.

The chancellor is assisted by five vice chancellors: one each for academic affairs; administration; community affairs; research and development; and student affairs. The vice chancellor for academic affairs assists the chancellor in coordinating curricular, instructional, library, and other programs of the university, while the vice chancellor for administration assists the chancellor in the administrative management of the campus. The vice-chancellor for community affairs assists the chancellor in promoting relationships within the university and in dealing with local government and safety issues, while the vice chancellor for research and development assists the chancellor in formulating guidelines and criteria for the university's research and development endeavors. Finally, the vice chancellor for student affairs assists the chancellor in promoting wellness and discipline among students in areas such as health, food services, and scholarship management.

== Academic structure ==
=== Admission procedures ===
Admission to UP Diliman is primarily determined through the University of the Philippines College Admission Test (UPCAT), a standardized five-hour examination administered annually in early August at test centers nationwide. The exam consists of sub-tests assessing applicants' proficiency in language, reading comprehension, mathematics, and science, presented in both English and Filipino. Applicants must not have taken any university subjects prior to the examination.

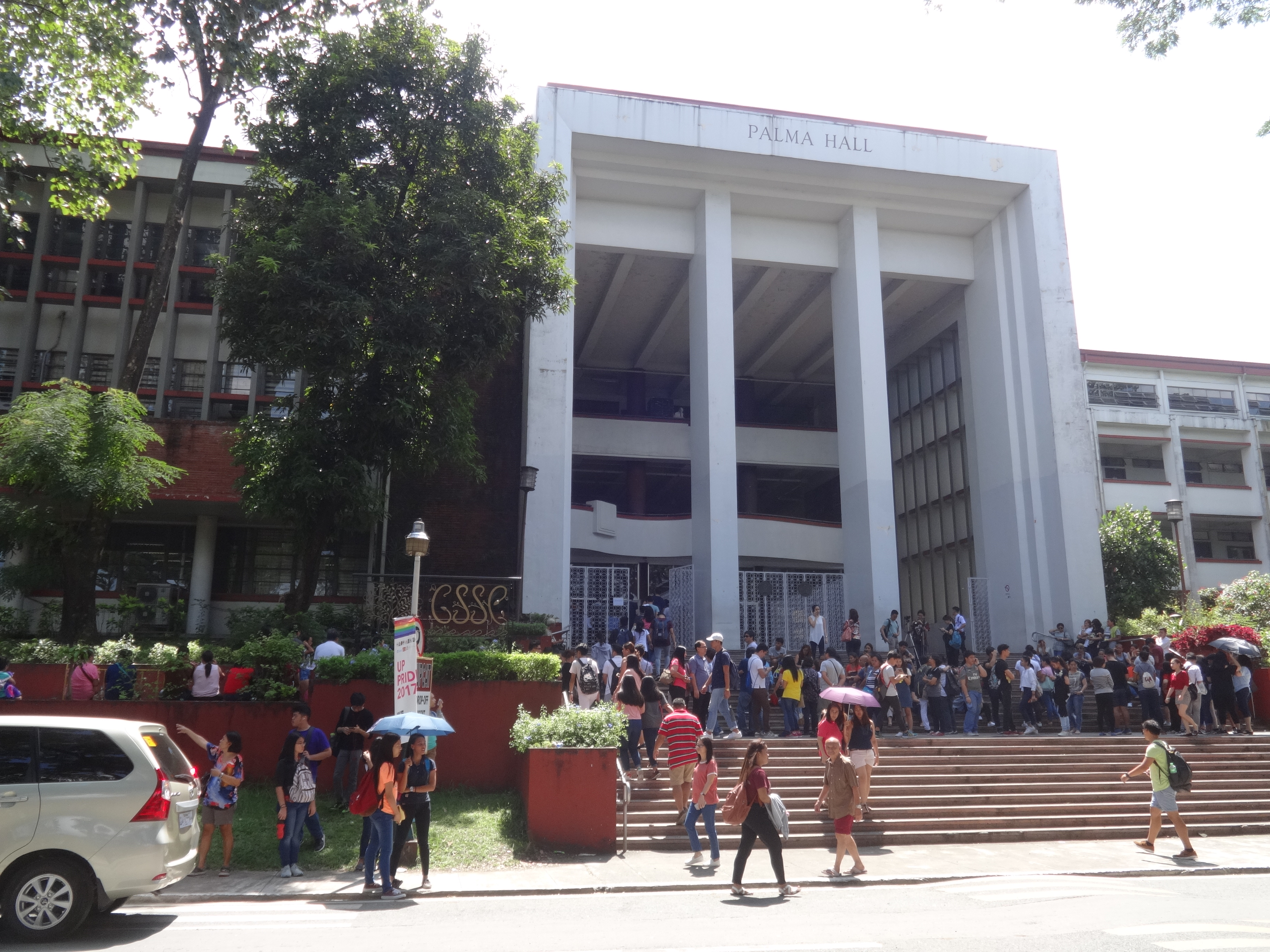
The Palma Hall crowded with applicants during UPCAT

Applicants are required to specify two preferred UP campuses and four degree programs for each campus in order of preference. Admission decisions are based on the University Predicted Grade (UPG), a composite score derived from the weighted UPCAT score (60%) and the weighted average of high school grades (40%). Socioeconomic and geographic factors are also considered to promote a diverse student population. The Office of the University Registrar facilitates the admission process, ensuring that applicants meet the university's rigorous academic standards.

In recent years the university has seen a significant number of applicants. In 2023, over 100,000 out of 111,000 students who applied for admission to the UP System were allowed to take the UPCAT, with UP Diliman admitting approximately 2,000 to 3,000 students per batch, resulting in an acceptance rate of around 2 to 3 percent.

=== Degree-granting units ===
UP Diliman is composed of 26 colleges, schools, and institutes which are officially called degree-granting units. The oldest of these is the College of Fine Arts, established in 1908 and originally located in Manila, with the first college to operate on the Diliman campus being the College of Music (then Conservatory of Music) in 1949. Each department within a college is headed by a department chair appointed by the chancellor on the recommendation of the dean or institute director, and has a tenure of three years, which may be extended for up to two terms. Each chair assumes the duties assigned to them by the dean and the chancellor.

Some units of the university are known as National Institutes – for example, the National Institute of Molecular Biology and Biotechnology – with the status of being a national institute determined by the Board of Regents, governed by Philippines legislation. Both the head of a national institute and its director are appointed by the president of the university, not the chancellor.

In addition to the units in the main campus, UP Diliman has degree-granting satellite campuses – officially named extension programs – in Angeles City, Pampanga (specifically in the Clark Freeport Zone area) and in Olongapo, Zambales. These degree-granting extension programs are headed by a director, who assumes the duties assigned by the chancellor.

=== Grading system and graduation ===
Academic performance is rated from 1.00 being excellent to 5.00 being failed. Grades from 1.00 to 3.00 are separated by increments of 0.25, while 3.00 is followed immediately by 4.00 and then 5.00. Some professors use 0.50 increments instead, and some colleges, particularly the College of Engineering, do not give 4.00 grades. A grade of 4.00 is a conditional grade and a student needs to remove that grade during a prescribed period (usually determined by the college where he or she is enrolled) or else it will become 5.00 once the period has lapsed. A conditional grade can only be removed by a removal exam. If the student passes the exam then he or she will obtain a grade of 3.00. Otherwise it is 5.00. An alternative for 4.00 is the rating of "INC", which means incomplete, and is given to students who have unfinished requirements for a particular subject. If a student drops the subject before the "subject dropping period" his or her record for that subject will be replaced by "DRP". Students who attain a grade point average of 1.20 or better, 1.45 to 1.20, or 1.75 to 1.45 on graduation are awarded as summa cum laude, magna cum laude, or cum laude respectively.

UP Diliman has an average of 3,190 undergraduates, 627 MS graduates, and 73 PhD students graduating every year. Up until 2014, graduation occurred every April and October, with commencement exercises being held only in April. A shift in the academic calendar moved graduation dates to June and December, with commencement exercises being held only during June. The greatest number of honor graduates come from the College of Social Sciences and Philosophy, followed by the College of Business Administration, College of Engineering, College of Media and Communication, and College of Architecture.

=== Basic education ===
The University of the Philippines Integrated School (UPIS) serves as the basic education unit of UP Diliman, offering a comprehensive curriculum from Kindergarten to Grade 12. It emerged from the integration of three distinct institutions – the UP High School, the UP Preparatory School, and the UP Elementary School – with the aim of creating a unified basic education across the three institutions.

=== Rankings and accreditation ===
UP Diliman holds the designation of "national university" under Republic Act No. 9500, also known as the "UP Charter of 2008". As the premier campus of the University of the Philippines System, UP Diliman is not subject to accreditation by any local accrediting body, but rather its academic programs undergo internal evaluation and quality assurance in alignment with international standards.

In the 2025 QS World University Rankings, UP Diliman was ranked 336th globally, making it the highest-ranked Philippine university in the listing. Similarly, in the Times Higher Education (THE) World University Rankings 2025, the university was placed within the 1201–1500 bracket worldwide. The US News Best Global Universities 2024 places UP Diliman at 1522nd globally and 559th in Asia.

== Arts ==
UP Diliman has been a major center for artistic and cultural development in the Philippines, with the university producing some of the country's most influential figures in the arts, including National Artists such as Lino Brocka, Ishmael Bernal, and Ricky Lee in film; Bienvenido Lumbera in literature; Napoleon Abueva in sculpture; and Fernando Amorsolo and José Joya in visual arts. In architecture, National Artists like Juan Nakpil and Leandro Locsin have left lasting legacies with structures such as the Quezon Hall and the Church of the Holy Sacrifice, shaping both the campus and modern Philippine architecture.

=== Academic programs and institutions ===
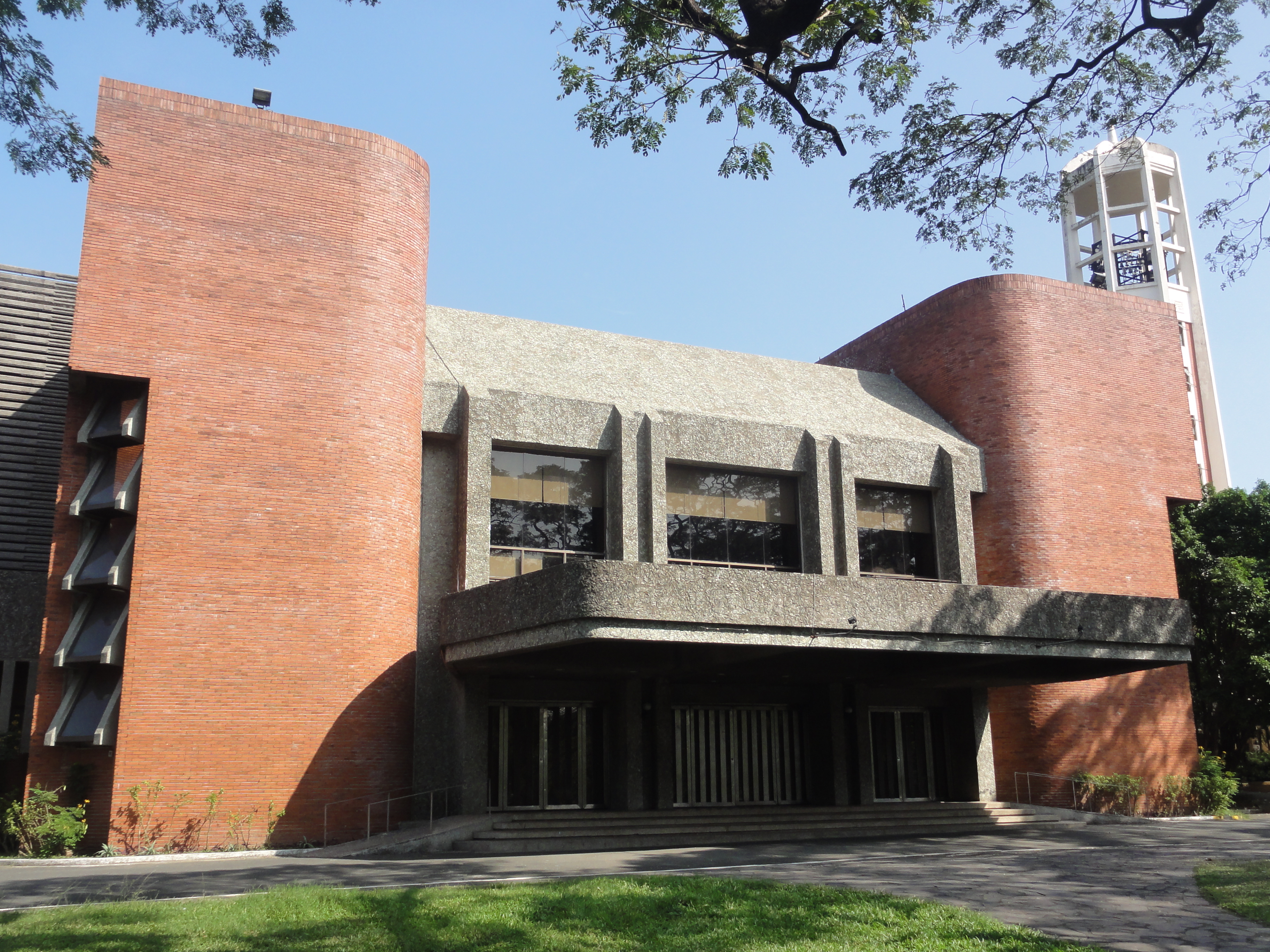
UP Theater, formally known as Villamor Hall

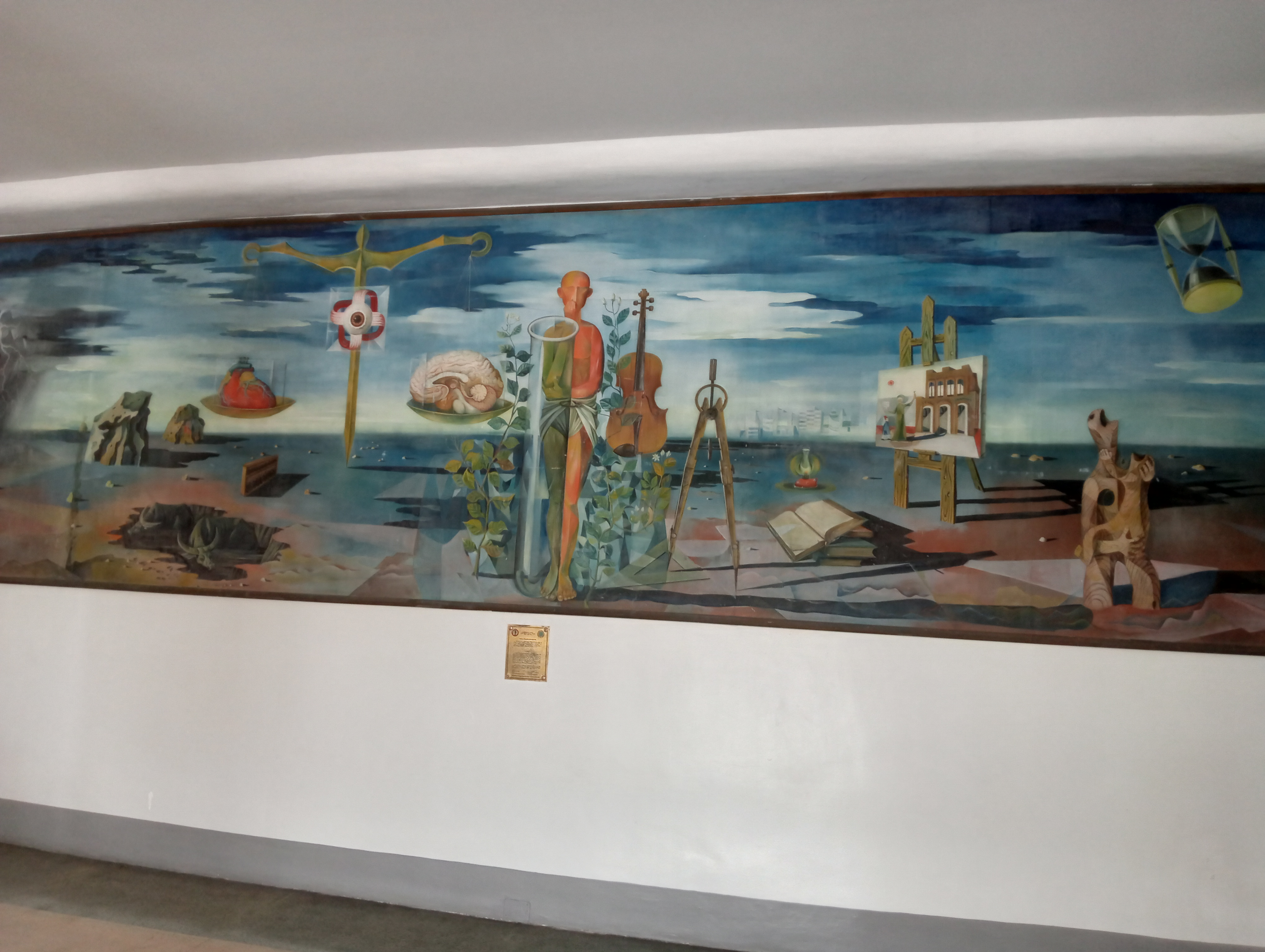
The Arts and Sciences, by Vicente Manansala

UP Diliman houses several academic units dedicated to the study and practice of the arts. The College of Arts and Letters (CAL) offers degree programs in literature, creative writing, art studies, theater arts, and speech communication. The College of Fine Arts (CFA) provides training in painting, sculpture, industrial design, and visual communication, while the College of Music (CMu) offers programs in composition, musicology, and performance. Additionally, the UP Film Institute (UPFI), under the College of Media and Communication, serves as the country's premier institution for film education, offering undergraduate and graduate programs in film and audiovisual communication.

In addition to its academic programs, UP Diliman supports various research and cultural institutions. The Jorge B. Vargas Museum and Filipiniana Research Center house collections of visual art, historical artifacts, and archival materials that document Philippine history and culture. The University Theater, Wilfrido Ma. Guerrero Theater, and Abelardo Hall Auditorium serve as venues for theatrical productions, concerts, and performances by students, faculty, and professional artists.

=== Performing arts ===
UP Diliman is home to numerous performing arts groups that have gained national and international recognition. Dulaang UP, the university's official theater company, stages a variety of classical and contemporary plays, while the UP Repertory Company focuses on socially relevant theater productions.

Several choral groups from UP Diliman have also received international acclaim, including the UP Singing Ambassadors, the UP Concert Chorus, and the UP Madrigal Singers, with the last-mentioned winning multiple choral competitions worldwide. UP Kontra-Gapi, a performing ensemble specializing in indigenous music and dance, promotes traditional Filipino musical forms.

== Campus culture ==
The UP Diliman community is colloquially known as the "Diliman Republic", reflecting its distinct identity and vibrant autonomous culture. Often described as a microcosm of Philippine society, the university mirrors the nation's diverse socio-political landscape and academic freedom.

The university is also home to several residential areas, including faculty housing and student dormitories, which contribute to a strong sense of solidarity between students and the wider Diliman community. Many students actively participate in local initiatives, community outreach programs, and socio-political movements, reinforcing the campus's role as a hub for civic engagement and activism.

=== Internal transport ===
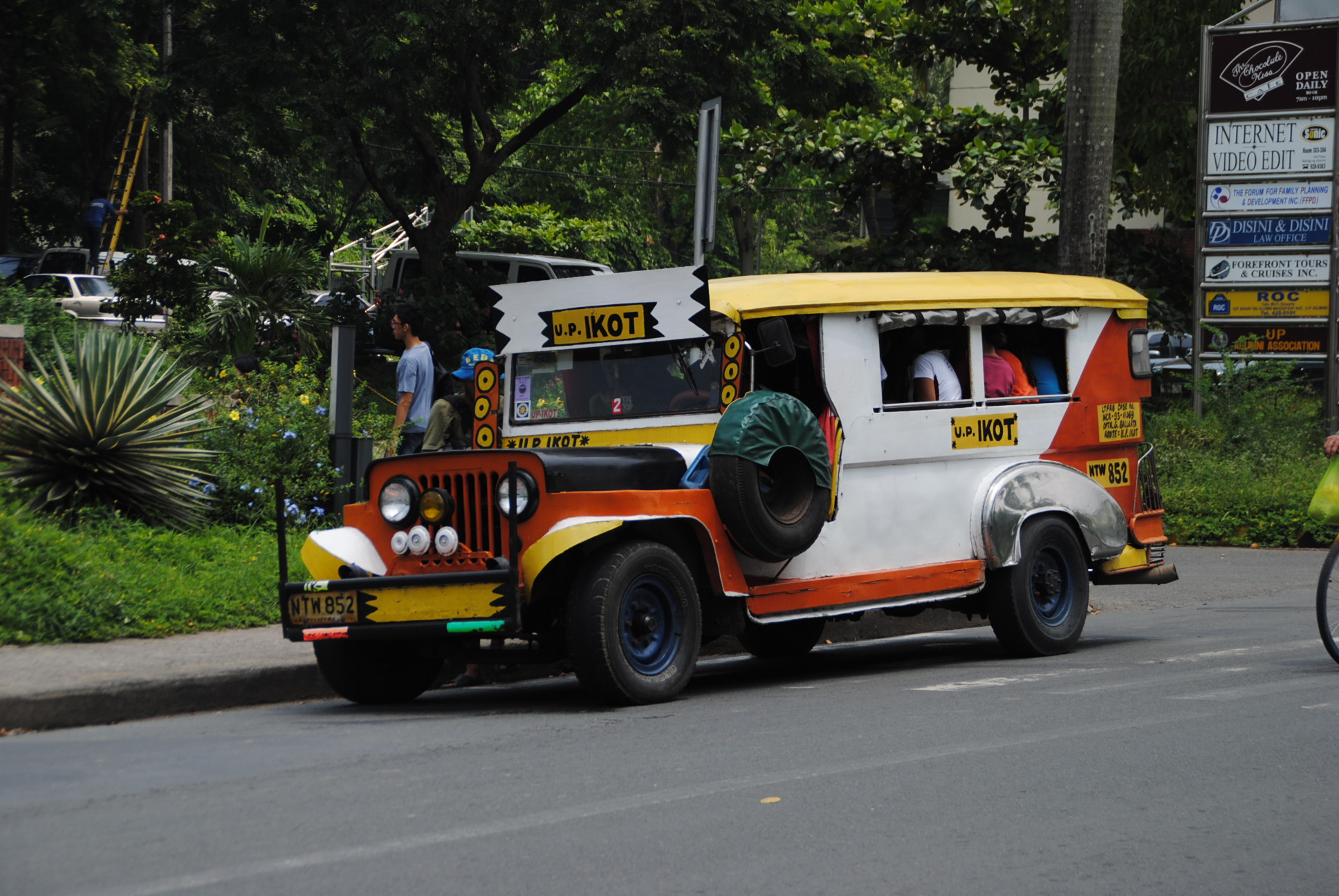
A UP Ikot jeepney operating inside UP Diliman

Due to the sheer size of its 493-hectare campus, UP Diliman is the only university in Metro Manila with its own jeepney transportation system. The "Ikot" and "Toki" jeepneys provide affordable and accessible transport within the campus and to nearby areas, with the route system designed to efficiently connect different parts of the university, including academic buildings, dormitories, and administrative offices.

=== Broadcasting ===
UP Diliman holds a congressional franchise to operate radio and television stations, making it the first university in the country with a licensed TV network and broadcast frequency. The university currently operates:

- DZUP 1602 – An AM radio station that serves as a teaching laboratory for Broadcast Communication students while also functioning as a community-based station providing educational content and public service announcements.
- TVUP – The University of the Philippines Internet Television, an online platform that broadcasts academic discussions, public service programs, and university events.

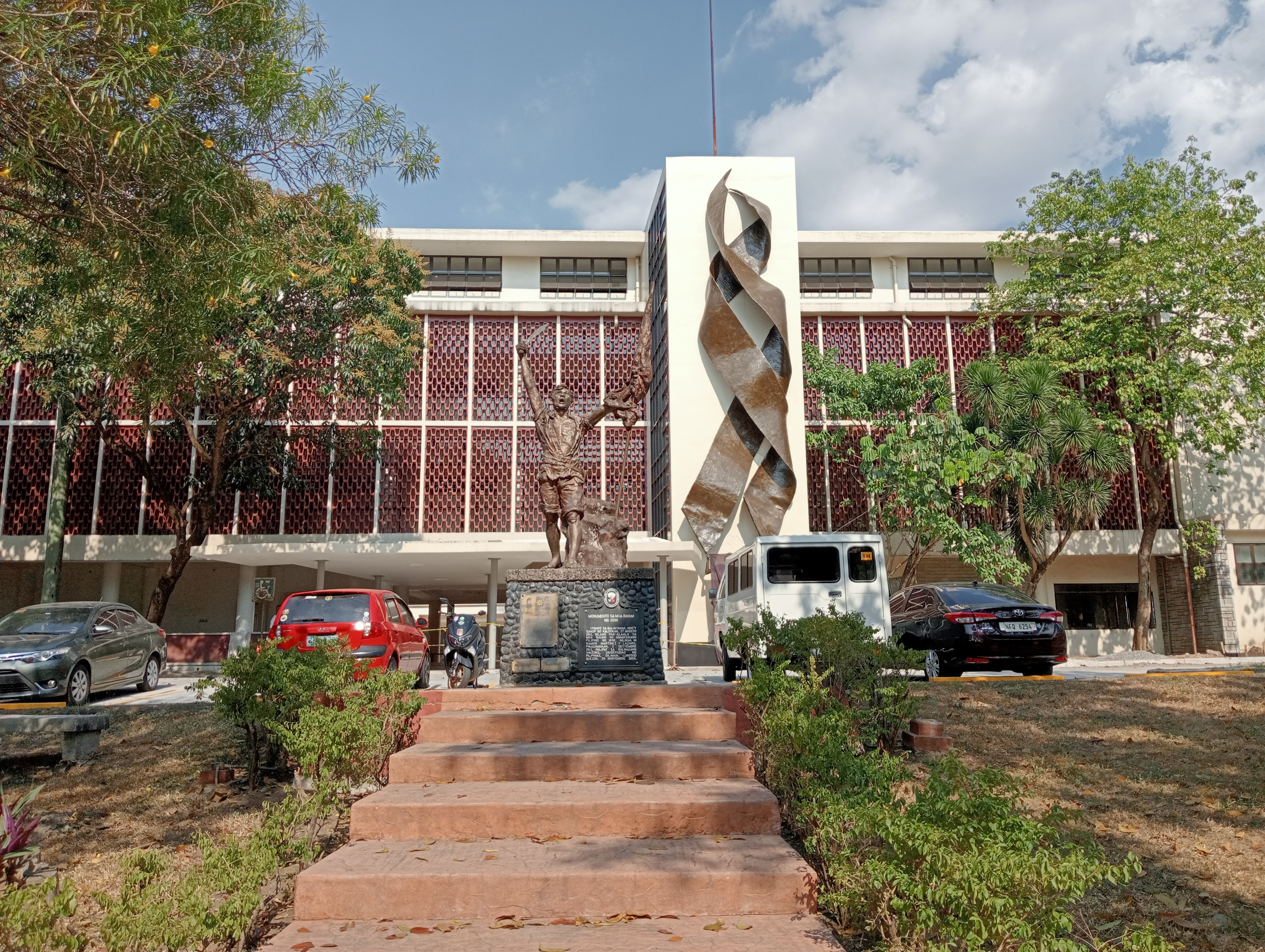
Vinzons Hall, the student activities center of the university, together with Monument to the Heroes of 1896, a sculpture by Ramon Martinez y Lazaro

=== Student housing ===
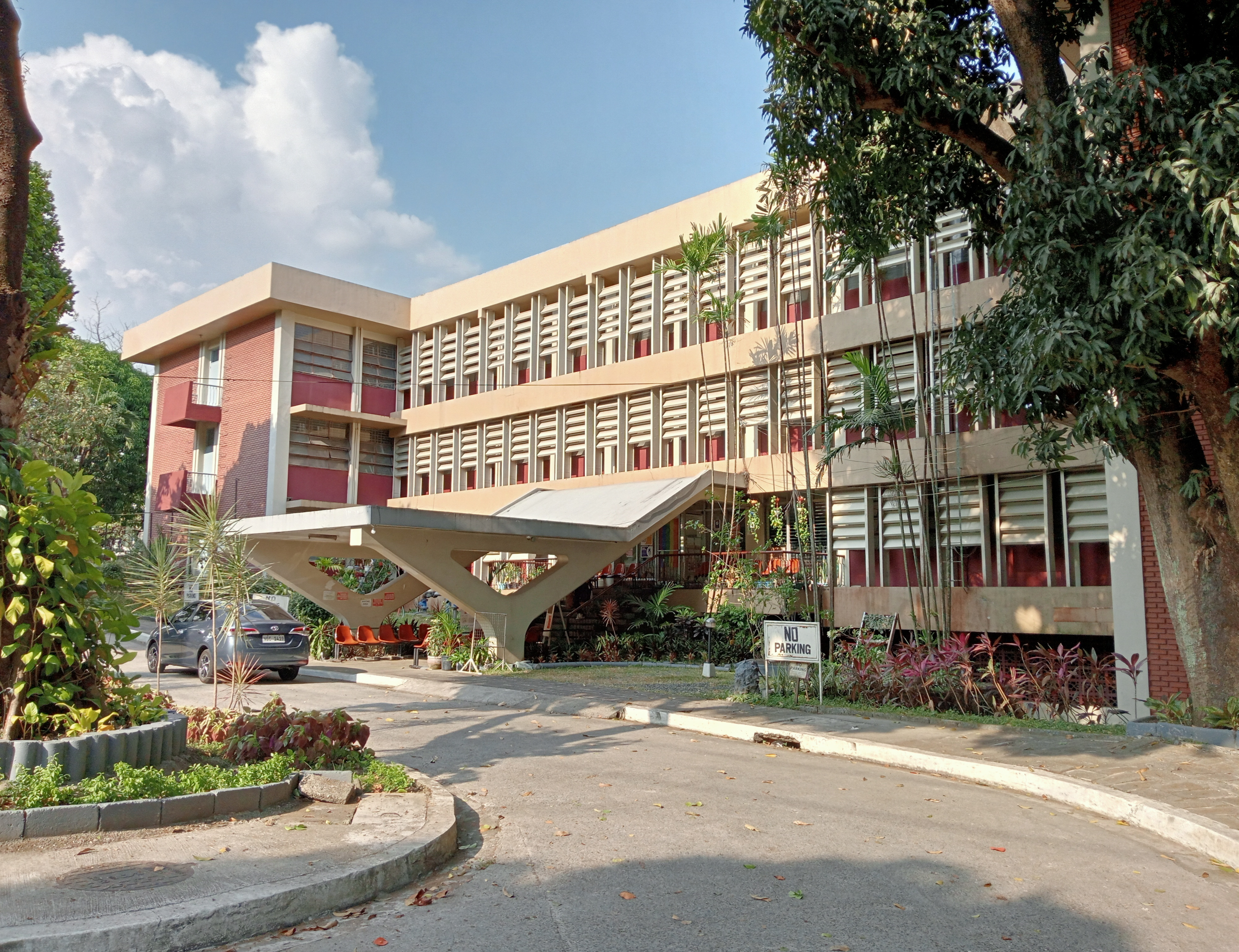
Kalayaan Residence Hall for upperclassmen

Among the university's dormitories, Kalayaan Residence Hall is designated for first-year students and offers full board and lodging, including meals. Upperclassmen may apply for accommodation in Molave, Yakal, and Ipil Residence Halls, which are co-educational, while Ilang-Ilang, Kamia, and Sampaguita Residence Halls are reserved for female undergraduate students. Graduate students have designated accommodation at Kamagong Residence Hall, while the International Center provides housing for foreign students, including exchange students and scholars. Additionally, the Centennial Residence Halls comprising Concordia B. Albarracin Hall for male students and Centennial 2 for female students, were established to commemorate the university's centennial and provide additional housing facilities.

Admission to these residence halls is based on financial need, academic standing, and geographic origin, with priority given to students from lower-income families and those residing in distant provinces. Applications are reviewed by the Dormitory Admissions Committee.

In addition to on-campus housing, many students seek accommodation in nearby areas such as Krus na Ligas, UP Village, and the Katipunan area, where private dormitories and apartments are available. To assist students in securing off-campus accommodations, the UP Diliman Alternative Housing Portal, an initiative of the University Student Council, provides listings and information on available housing options.

=== Student organizations and activism ===
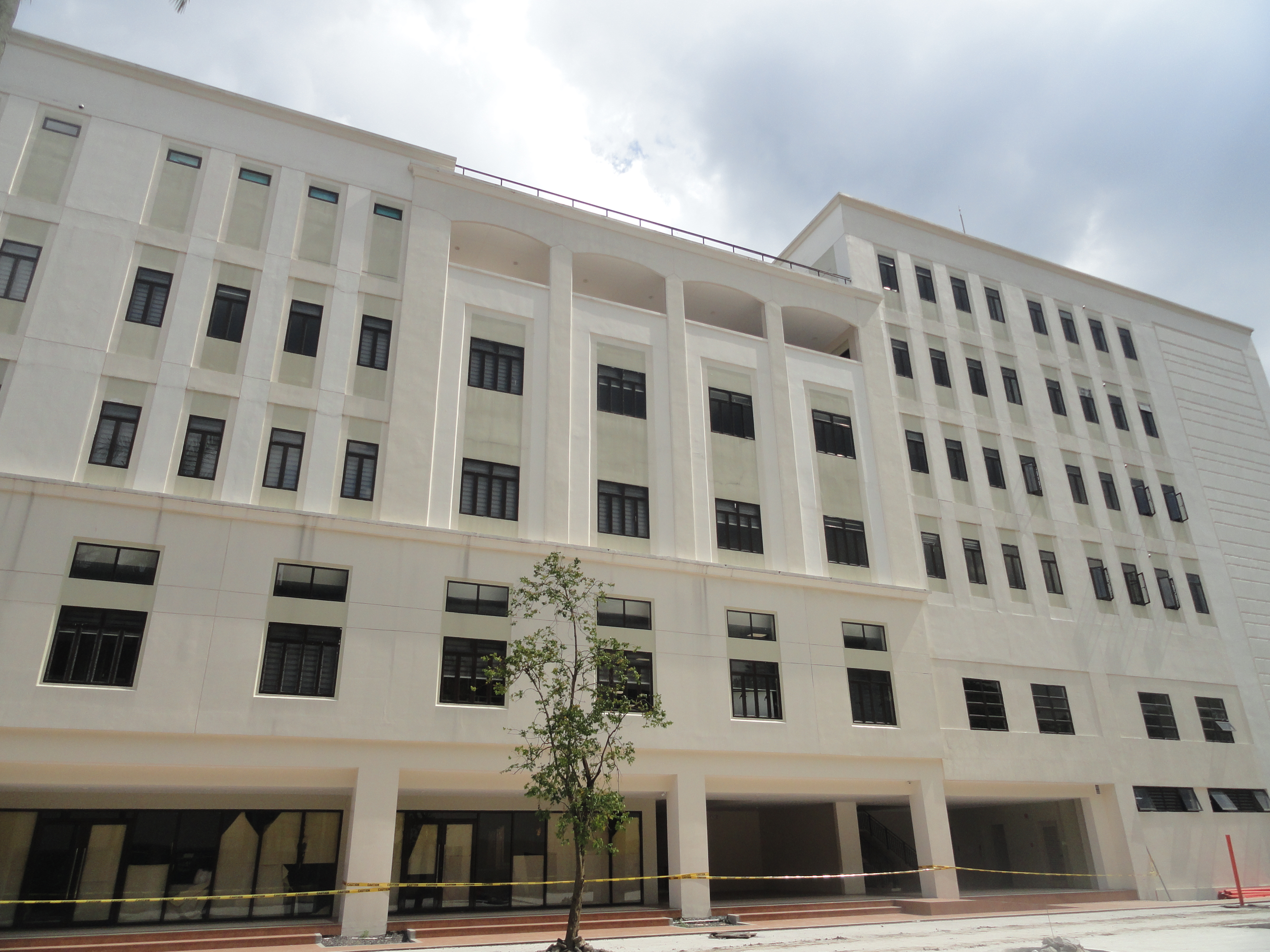
The new Student Union Building, which serves as an extension to the older Vinzons Hall

The University Student Council (USC), elected annually by the student body, serves as the primary representative of student interests, organizing programs and campaigns addressing student concerns. In contrast with private universities where student government elections tend to focus on campus-specific concerns, UP Diliman's student movements regularly intersect with national issues, drawing participation from faculty, alumni, and broader activist networks.

The university has long been a hub for student-led movements influencing both campus policies and national affairs. And while student politics exists in other universities across the country, UP Diliman is unique in the depth, frequency, and national impact of its political activities, with students actively participating in movements related to education policies, human rights, environmental advocacy, and political reforms.

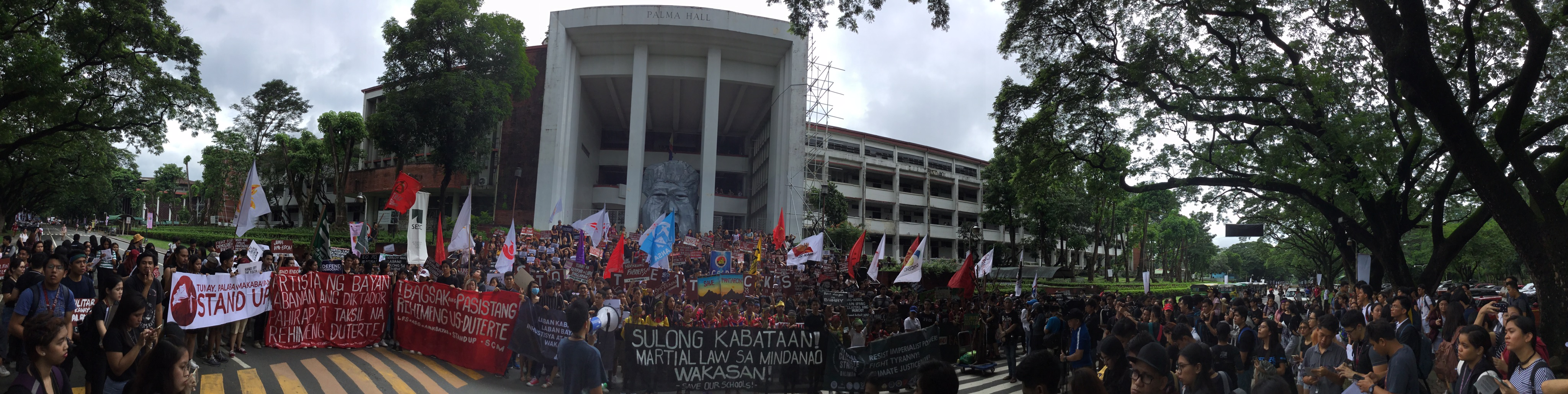
Activist organizations in UP Diliman in front of Palma Hall led a student walkout protest in 2019 commemorating the 47th anniversary of the declaration of martial law

The campus played a key role in movements such as the First Quarter Storm (1970) and the Diliman Commune (1971), which highlighted student participation in national political discourse. The university continues to be a venue for protests, mobilizations, and public forums addressing contemporary social and political issues, making for a politically active campus culture.

=== Oblation Run ===
The Oblation Run is an annual event organized by the Alpha Phi Omega (APO) fraternity at UP Diliman. Established in 1977 the event features fraternity members running naked through the campus to protest social and political issues, drawing inspiration from the university's iconic Oblation statue which symbolizes selfless offering to the nation.

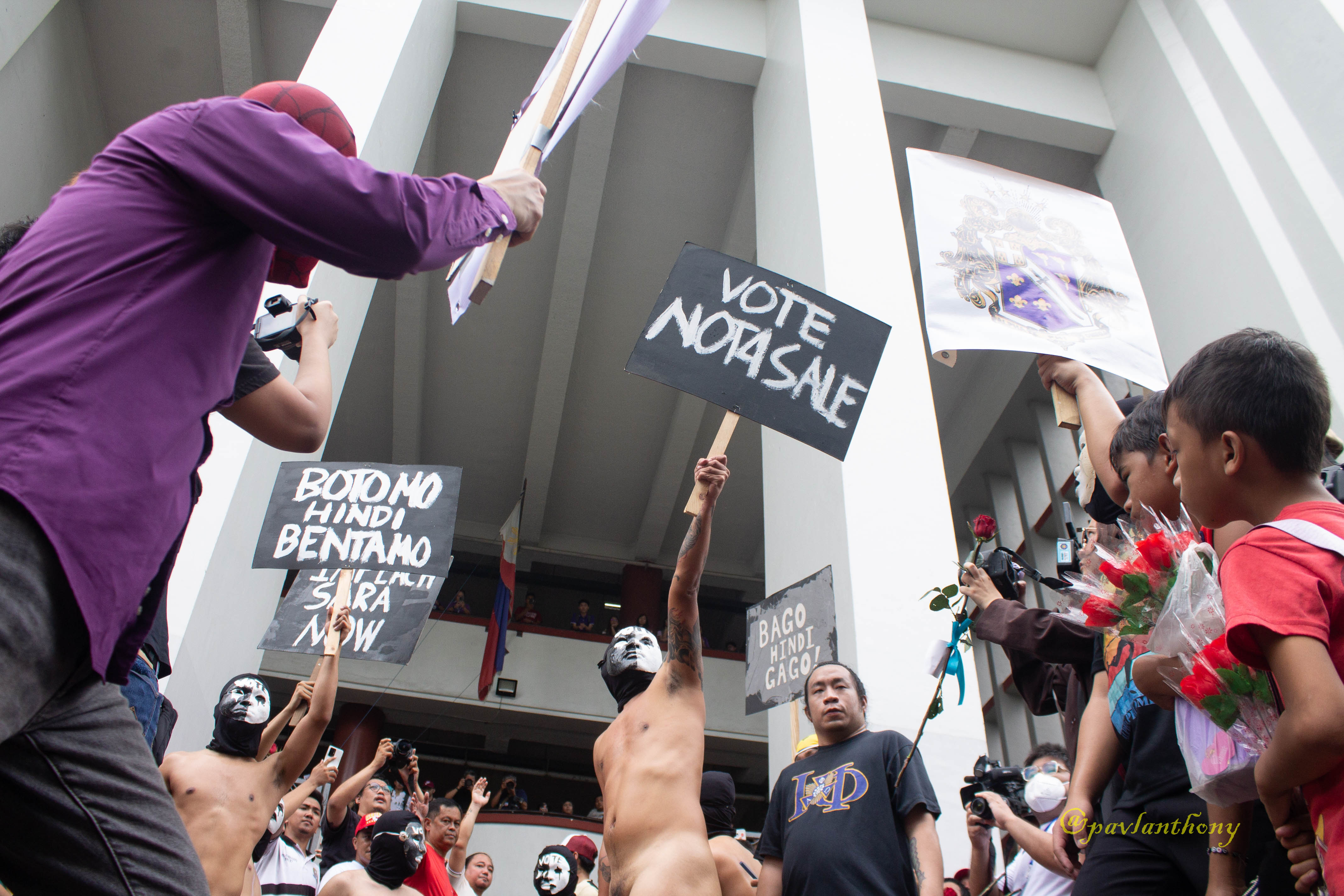
Members of the Alpha Phi Omega fraternity conducting the annual Oblation Run Protest on February 14, 2025, in Palma Hall

The inaugural run protested the banning of the film Hubad na Bayani (Naked Hero), which depicted human rights abuses during martial law. Over the years the Oblation Run has evolved into a platform for advocating various causes such as fair elections, freedom of expression, and other national concerns. Traditionally held on December 16 to mark APO's founding anniversary, the event has also been scheduled on other dates to align with specific advocacies. For instance, the 2025 Oblation Run took place on February 14, focusing on themes related to electoral integrity.

=== Campus events ===
2007 Lantern Parade in UP Diliman

The Lantern Parade is held in the last week before the Christmas break, and the UP Fair is held every February. During the Lantern Parade the individual colleges as well as groups within UP Diliman create Christmas lanterns and floats and then parade around the Academic Oval, culminating in a lengthy program held in front of the amphitheater, capped off by a fireworks display. In recent years the event has become so popular outside of UP that major television networks and media outlets regularly send crews to broadcast the event live.

The UP Fair is organized by the UP Diliman University Student Council and is a week-long event during the third week of February held at the Sunken Garden, featuring evening music concerts, booths, and amusement park rides.

=== UP Fighting Maroons ===
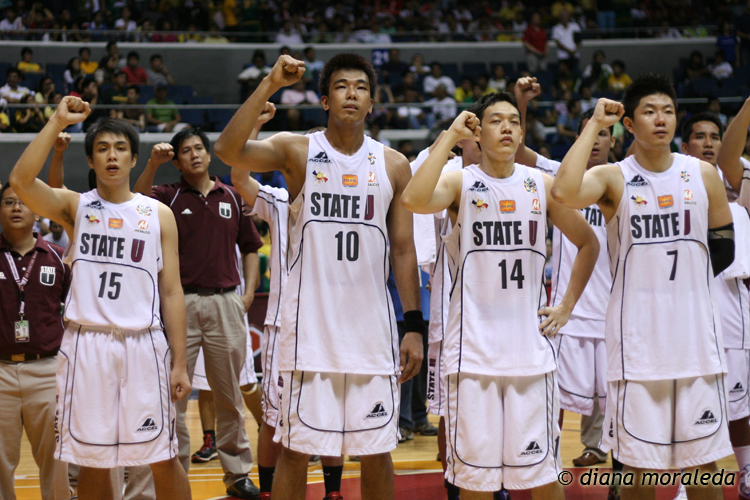
UP Fighting Maroons compete in the University Athletic Association of the Philippines (UAAP)

The UP Fighting Maroons is the name of the UP Diliman collegiate varsity teams which play in all events in the University Athletic Association of the Philippines (UAAP), the premier sports league in the country. The Fighting Maroons have perennially placed in the top three in the overall points race of the UAAP. Before UAAP Season 78 the women's collegiate varsity teams were known as the Lady Maroons.

The University of the Philippines Integrated School – the UP affiliate high school – play as the Junior Maroons (formerly the Preps), although they are now also called simply the Fighting Maroons.

== Student organizations ==
=== Student publication ===
The Philippine Collegian, also known as Kulê, is the official student publication of UP Diliman. Established in 1922, it is one of the oldest student publications in the country and is known for its progressive stance, investigative journalism, and active participation in socio-political issues. It played a crucial role during the period of Martial Law as a medium for student activism.

=== Fraternities ===
- Alpha Phi Beta (ΑΦΒ): Established in 1939, APB is a law-based fraternity, one of three law-based fraternities in the College of Law.
- Alpha Phi Omega (ΑΦΩ): APO is an international service fraternity and the first established national chapter outside of the United States, although both organizations have separate leaderships and operate independently.
- Alpha Sigma (ΑΣ): Established in protest at the destructive behavior of many fraternities, instead seeking to be an advocate for academics.
- Beta Sigma (ΒΣ): Established in 1946.
- Pi Sigma (ΠΣ): Established in 1972 and re-established in 2022.
- Sigma Rho (ΣΡ): Established in 1938.
- Tau Alpha (ΤΑ): Established in 1932.
- Tau Gamma Phi (ΤΓΦ): Also known as the Triskelions' Grand Fraternity, it was established in 1968.
- Upsilon Sigma Phi (ΥΣΦ): Established in 1918, it is the oldest Greek-letter fraternity in Asia.

=== Sororities ===
- Alpha Sigma Nu (ΑΣΝ): The sister sorority of the Alpha Sigma fraternity.
- Delta Lambda Sigma (ΔΣΛ): The sister sorority of the Sigma Rho fraternity.
- Phi Delta Alpha (ΦΔΑ): The sister sorority of the Alpha Phi Beta fraternity, established in 1957.
- Portia: The only law-based sorority in the UP College of Law.
- Sigma Beta (Σβ): The sister sorority of the Beta Sigma fraternity, established in 1932.
- Sigma Delta Phi (ΣΔΦ): The sister sorority of the Upsilon Sigma Phi fraternity, established in 1933.
- Tau Gamma Sigma (ΤΓΣ): Established in 1969 and also known as the Triskelions' Grand Sorority.

== In popular culture ==
=== Cinema and television ===
UP Diliman has been featured in several notable Filipino films, including: I'm Drunk, I Love You (2017), directed by J.P. Habac; Dekada '70 (2002), directed by Chito S. Roño and based on Lualhati Bautista's novel; Moral (1982), directed by Marilou Diaz-Abaya; Mangarap Ka (1995), directed by Rory B. Quintos; Starting Over Again (2014), directed by Olivia M. Lamasan; Alone/Together (2019), directed by Antoinette Jadaone; as well as the television series Ina, Kapatid, Anak (2012–2013).

== Notable alumni ==
Since UP was not organized as a university system until 1972, non-medical graduates of the original Manila campus of the University of the Philippines are considered alumni of both UP Diliman and UP Manila. Graduates before 1999 of what is now the University of the Philippines Baguio are also considered alumni of UP Diliman, since the Baguio campus was previously an extension college of UP Diliman.

UP Diliman has numerous notable alumni and faculty, having graduated many leading figures in the Philippines. In the country's political history, UP has produced former Philippine presidents José Laurel, Elpidio Quirino, Diosdado Macapagal, Ferdinand E. Marcos, and Gloria Macapagal Arroyo; former Philippine vice-presidents Salvador Laurel, Jejomar Binay and Leni Robredo; statesmen Benigno Aquino Jr., Arturo Tolentino, and Gerardo Roxas; prominent jurists such as former chief justices Querube Makalintal, and Enrique Fernando; and members of Congress including Senator Kiko Pangilinan and Representative Martin Romualdez. In business, Araneta patriarch and billionaire Jorge L. Araneta graduated from UP.

== See also ==
- DZUP 1602
- Church of the Holy Sacrifice
- Jorge B. Vargas Museum and Filipiniana Research Center
- University of the Philippines Baguio
- University of the Philippines Cebu
- University of the Philippines Los Baños
- University of the Philippines Manila
- University of the Philippines Mindanao
- University of the Philippines Open University
- University of the Philippines Tacloban
- University of the Philippines Visayas
