= UP Vargas Museum =

University museum in Quezon City, Philippines

Jorge B. Vargas Museum & Filipiniana Research Center
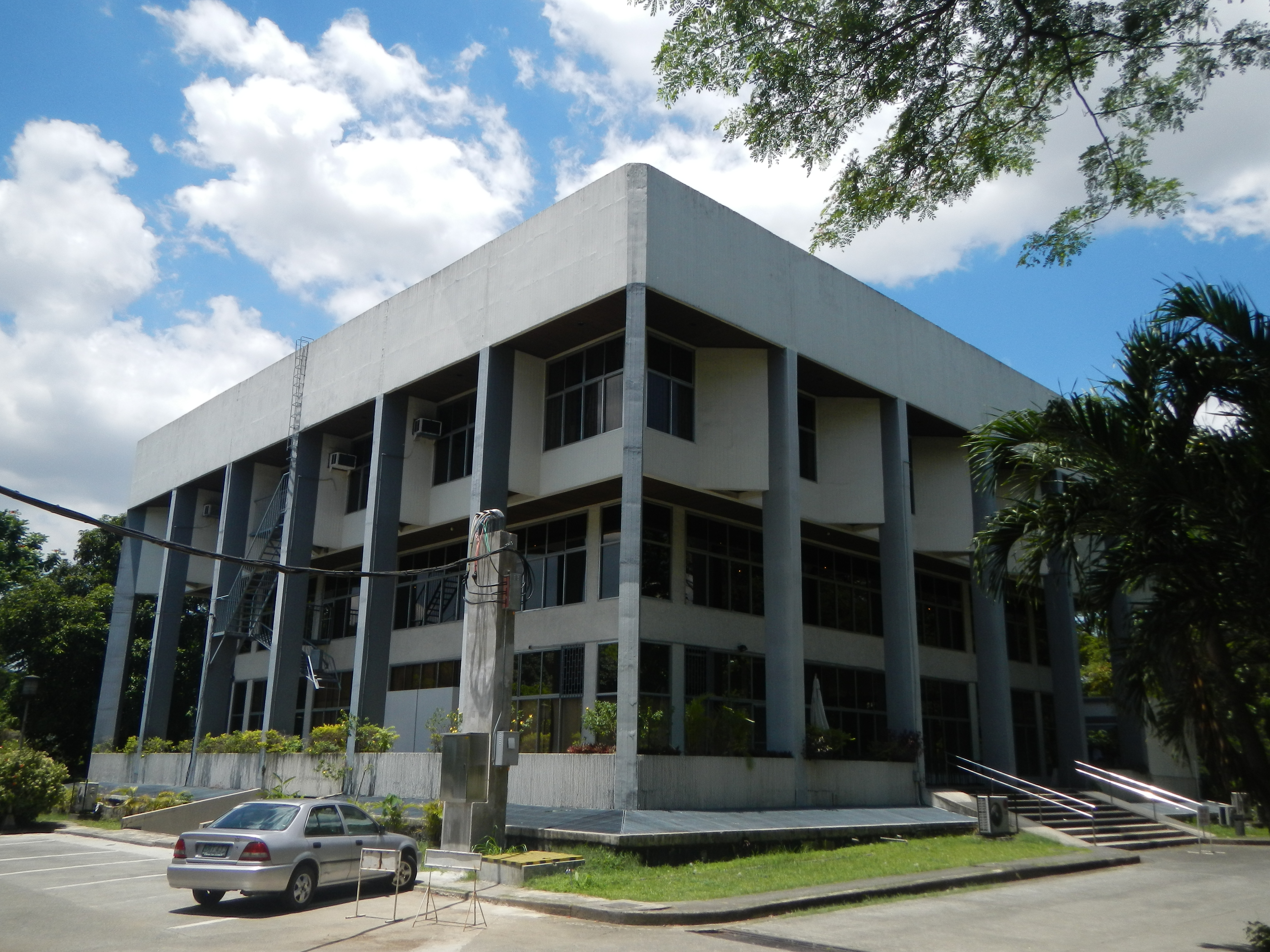
- Location: University of the Philippines Diliman, Quezon City, Philippines
- Coordinates: 14°39′11″N 121°4′0″E
- Owner: UP Diliman College of Arts and Letters
- Website: vargasmuseum.wordpress.com vargasmuseum.org

The Jorge B. Vargas Museum & Filipiniana Research Center, simply known as the UP Vargas Museum, is a museum located at the University of the Philippines (UP) Diliman campus which houses the collection of art, stamps and coins, library, personal papers and memorabilia of Jorge B. Vargas which he bequeathed to the university. It is under the management of the UP Diliman College of Arts and Letters.

== History ==
The construction of the building which would host the UP Vargas Museum began in 1983. The museum building was inaugurated on February 22, 1987, by then-President Corazon Aquino.

== Collection and exhibitions ==
The Museum is known for its collection of the paintings of Juan Luna, Felix Resurreccion Hidalgo, Victorio Edades and Fernando Amorsolo. It also hosts temporary exhibitions.

== See also ==
- Filipiniana
