= Quezon City Academy =

Quezon City Academy Foundation Inc.
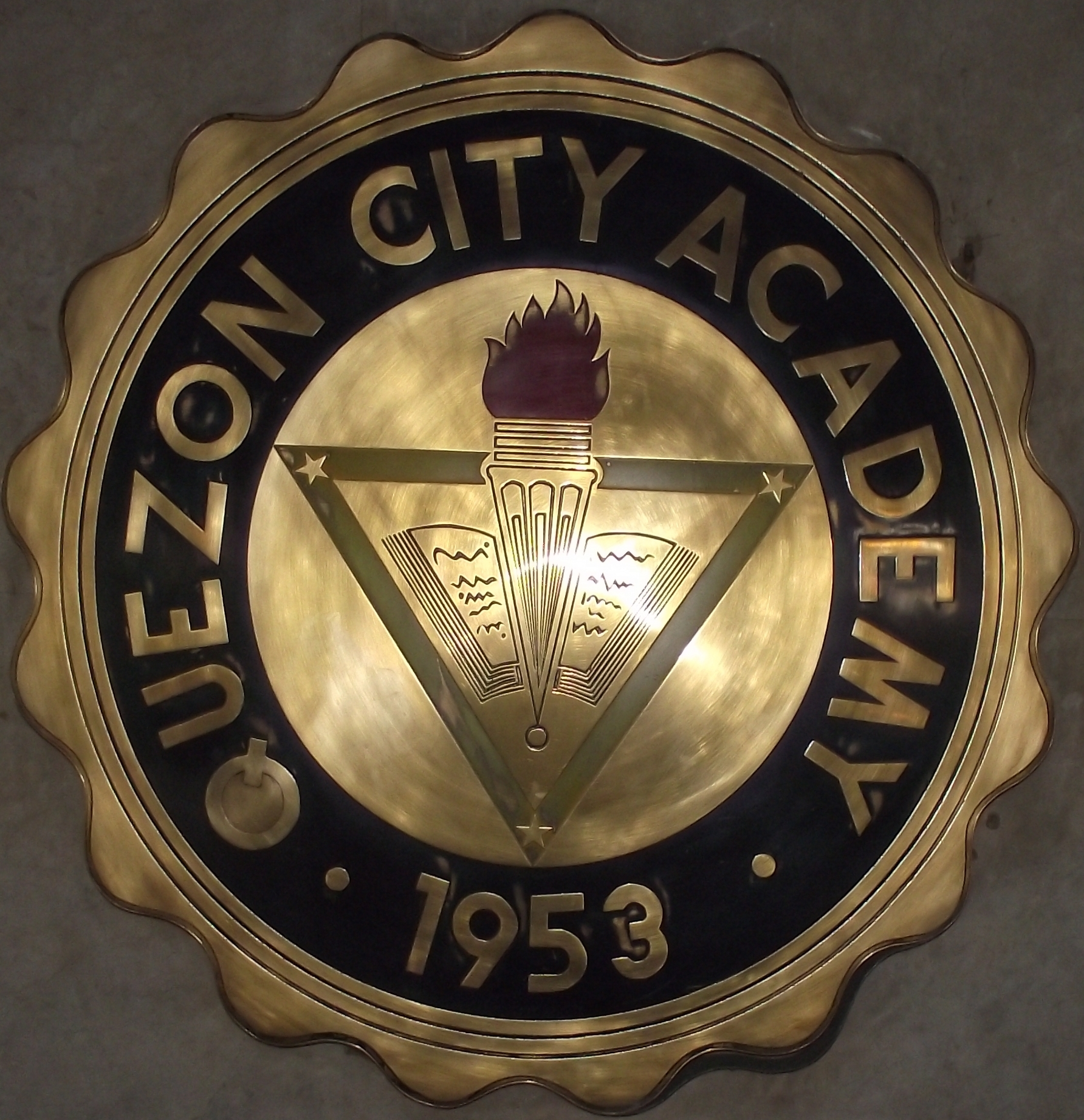

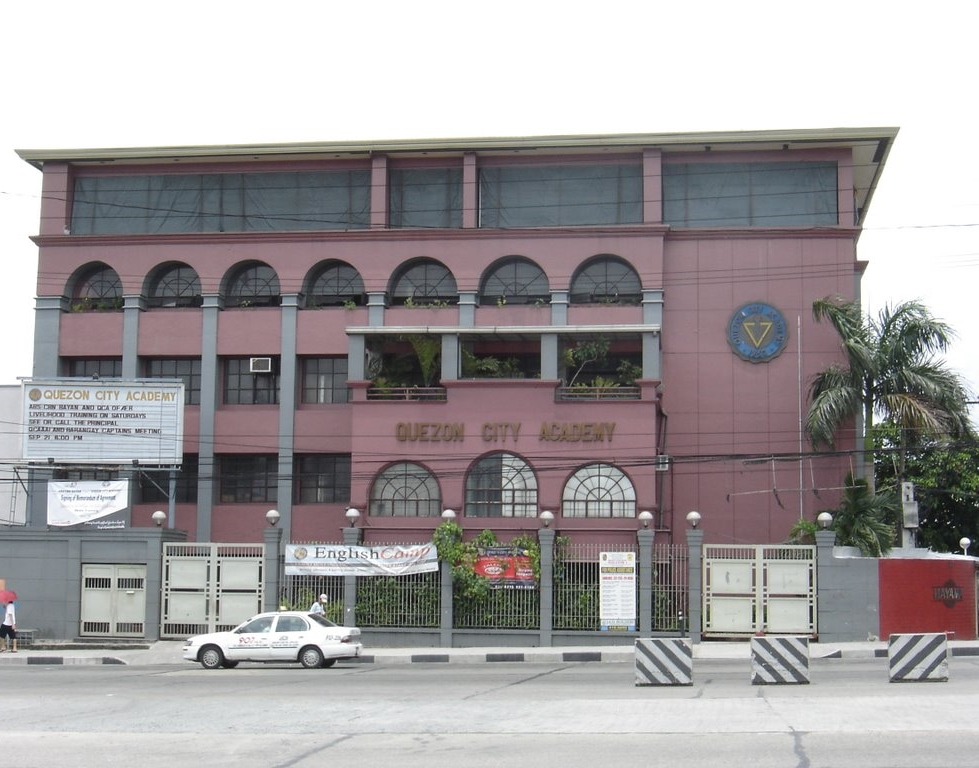
- Quezon City Academy's campus.

Location
- 1144 Epifanio delos Santos Avenue; Quezon City, Metro Manila; Philippines
- Coordinates: 14°39′24.57″N 121°1′33.21″E

Information
- Type: Private Secondary School
- Established: 1953
- President: Vivien R. Riano
- Principal: Merlyn M. Eligio
- Grades: Junior and Senior High School (7-12)
- Colors: Maroon and White
- Athletics: QCA Jaguars
- Nickname: Kyoka
- Newspaper: QCA Echo
- Website: qca.edu.ph

Quezon City Academy is a private secondary school in Quezon City, Philippines.

== History ==
Established in 1953, "Quezon City Academy (QCA)" was originally known as the "Bago Bantay High School".

In 1963, Justice Carmelino Gomez Alvendia, Sr. (Court of Appeals) bought "Bago Bantay High School" in chronic decay. In its first year of operation, "Bago Bantay High School" changed its name to "Quezon City Academy". In that same year, the Bago Bantay authorities made a relocation area for squatters from Sampaloc to Intramuros, Manila. A competitive public school, the San Francisco High School (formerly Don Mariano Marcos High School) was established nearby. QCA was receiving minimal patronage from the people it aimed to serve.

Justice Alvendia made renovations to QCA until it became one of the most notable IT secondary schools in the Philippines. In 1965 enrolment rose to 132. In the 1980s the population had increased to 2,700 students with almost 450 graduates every year. The students are drawn from Bago Bantay, Project 7, Project 8, Sto. Niño, Pag-asa, Project 6, Balintawak, Bagong Barrio, San Francisco del Monte, West Avenue and other nearby areas in Quezon City.

In the 1997-1998 National Secondary Assessment Test, QCA carded a general average of 98.9%.

== Curriculum ==
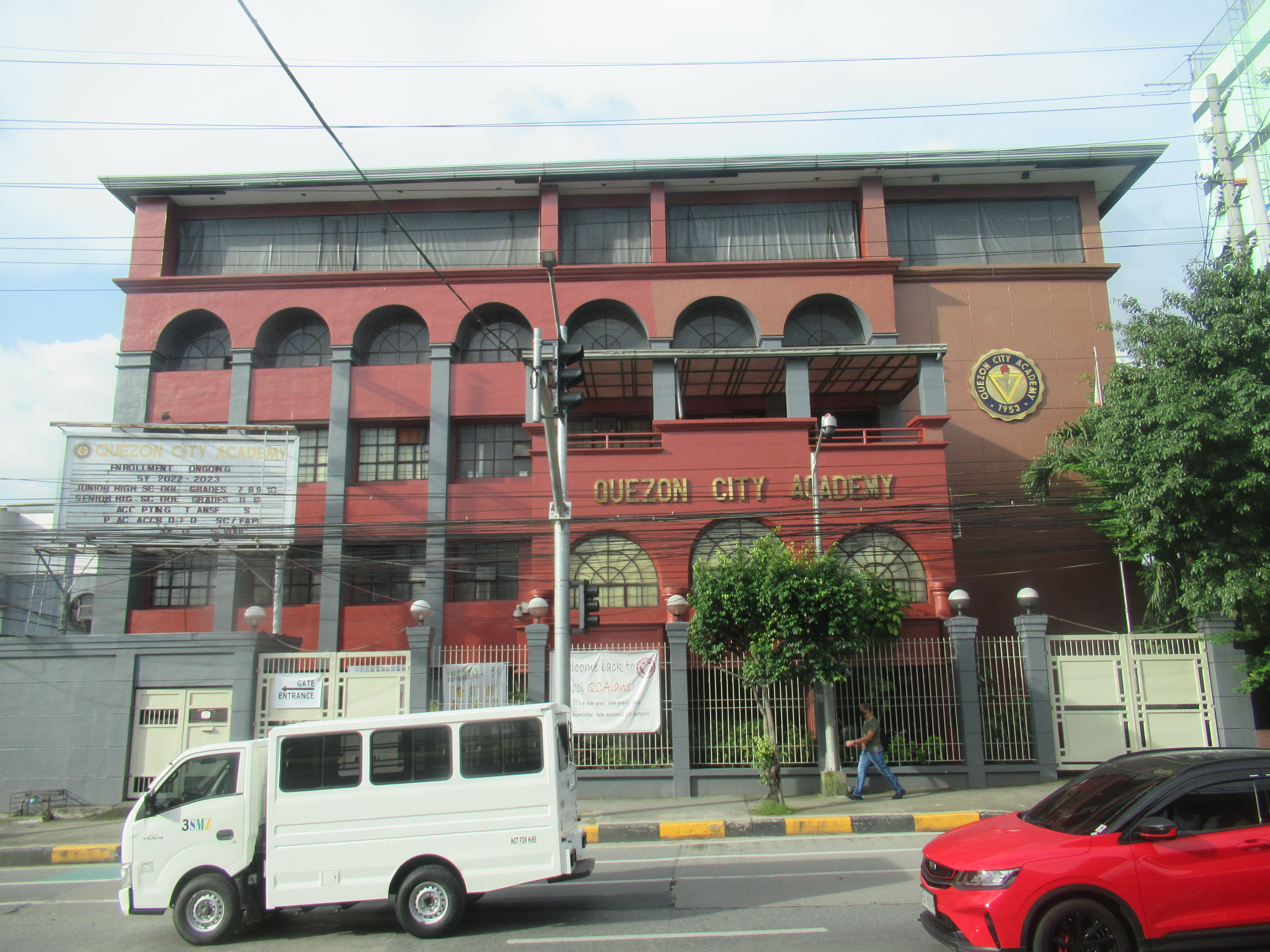
Facade in October 2022

QCA students are taught basic and advanced IT software. During their first year, students are taught with basic and advanced Microsoft Operating System. This includes Word, Powerpoint, Excel and Frontpage. In the second year, students are taught HTML. Adobe Photoshop and GIMP are taught to students during their third year. During the final year, students are taught Macromedia Flash and GIF animations.

In 2000, the U.P. Diliman Student Council chairman was a graduate of Quezon City Academy, Raymond Palatino (batch 1996).

In 2016, the school began offering Grade 11 courses in the tracks of STEM (Science, Technology, Engineering and Math) and ABM (Accountancy, Business and Management).

== Administration ==
President	From	To
Justice Carmelino G. Alvendia, Sr.	1963	1982
Dean Esperanza Pahati-Alvendia	1982	2001
Tomas C. Ongoco	2001	2014
Florentina C. Gonzales	2014	2025
Vivien R. Riano	2025	Present

== Notable alumni ==
- Raymond Palatino - congressman, 14th Congress of the Philippines
- Rodney Brondial - PBA Player, San Miguel Beermen

== See also ==
- Manuel L. Quezon University
