= Floridablanca, Pampanga =

Municipality in Pampanga, Philippines

Floridablanca
- Municipality
- Municipality of Floridablanca
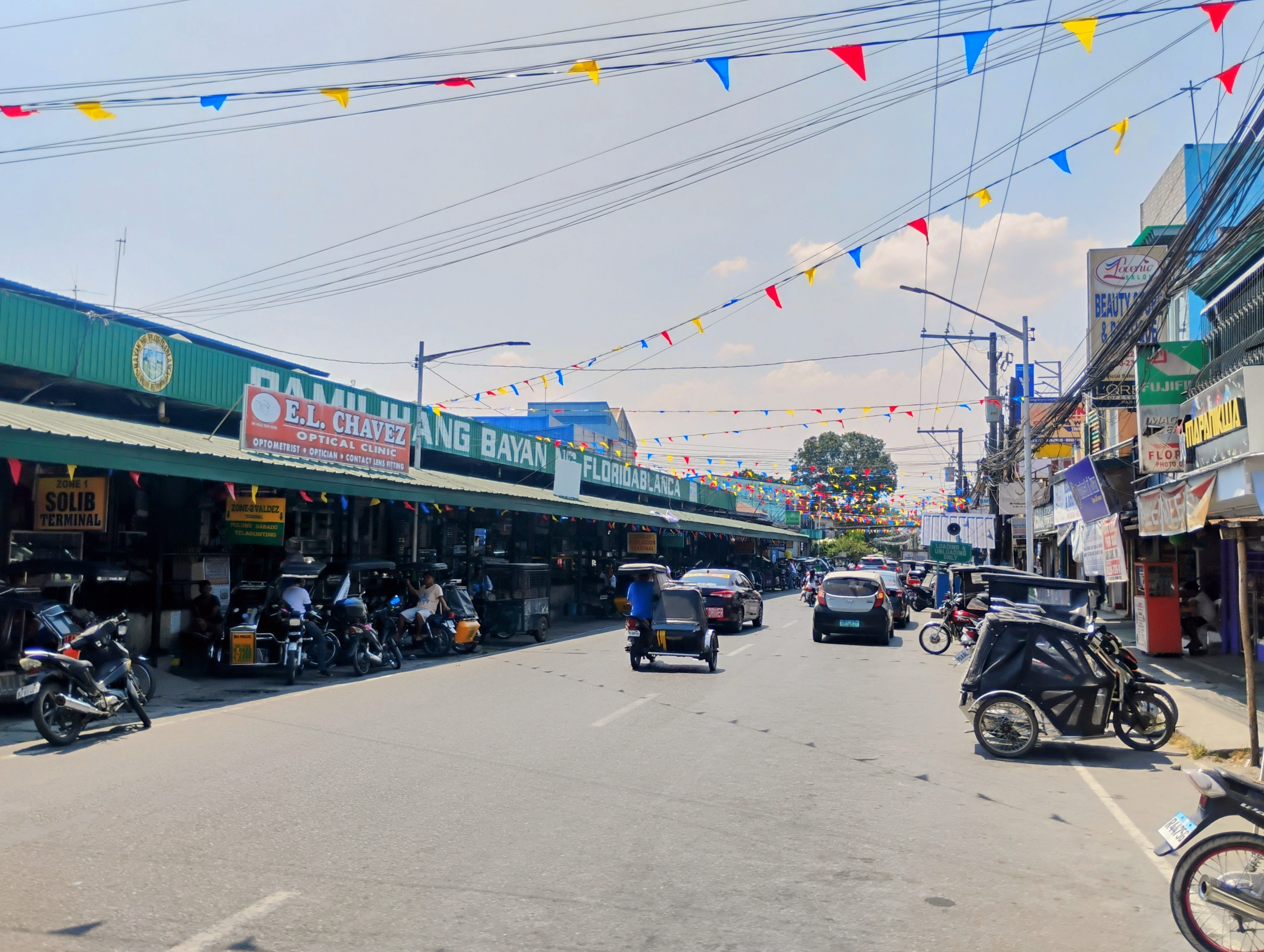
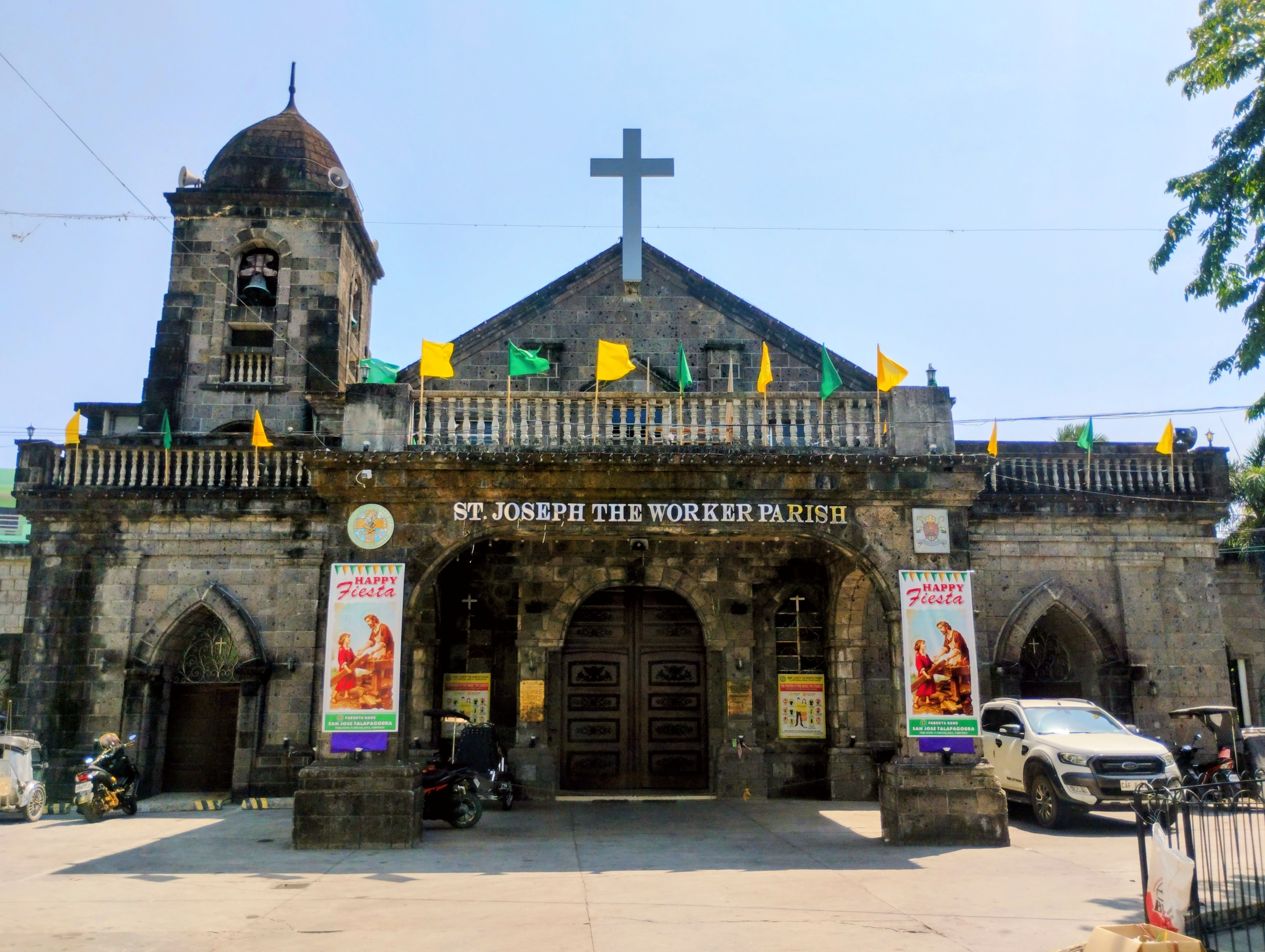
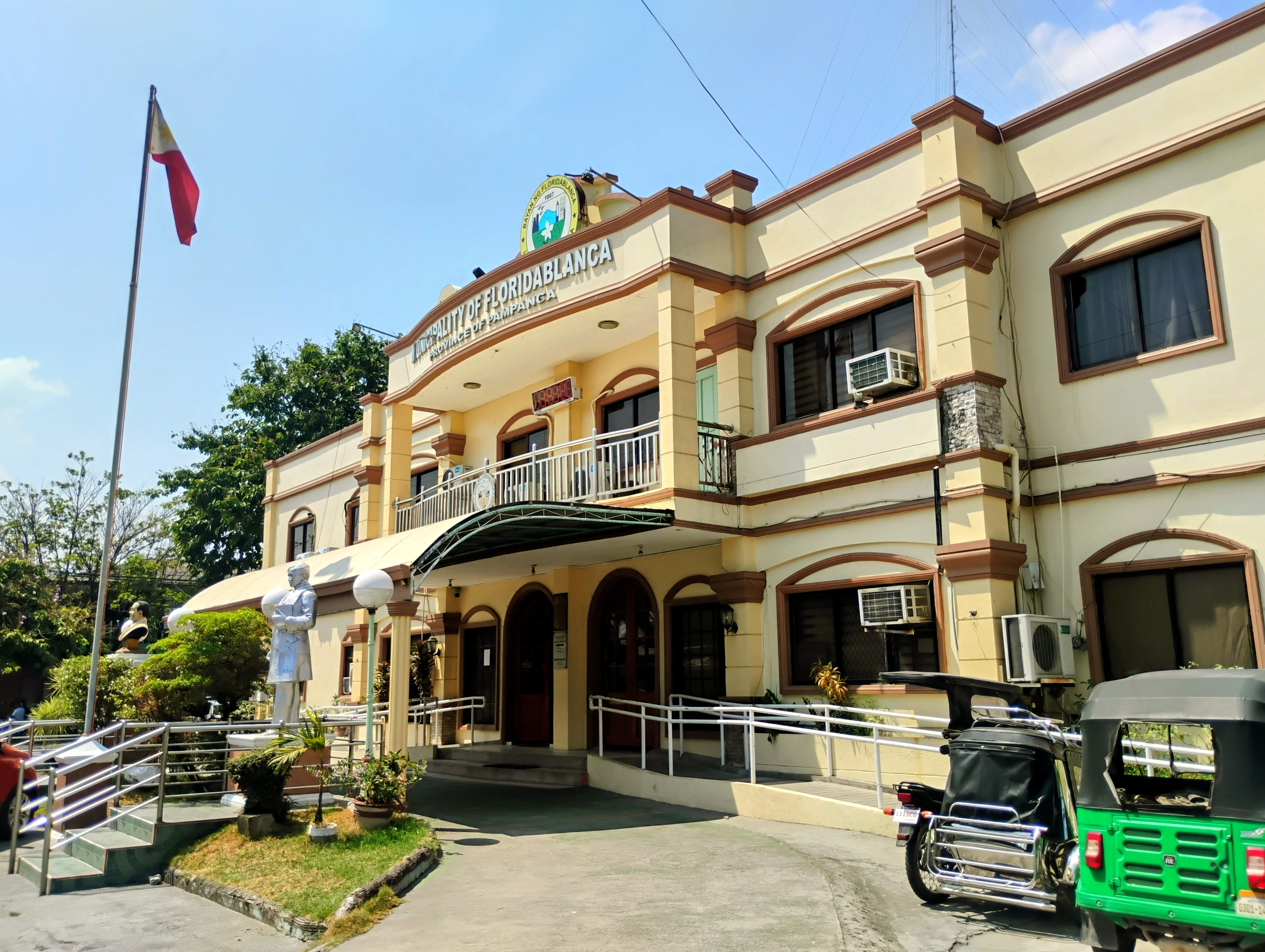
- Floridablanca Town Proper San Jose Obrero Church Old Floridablanca Municipal Hall

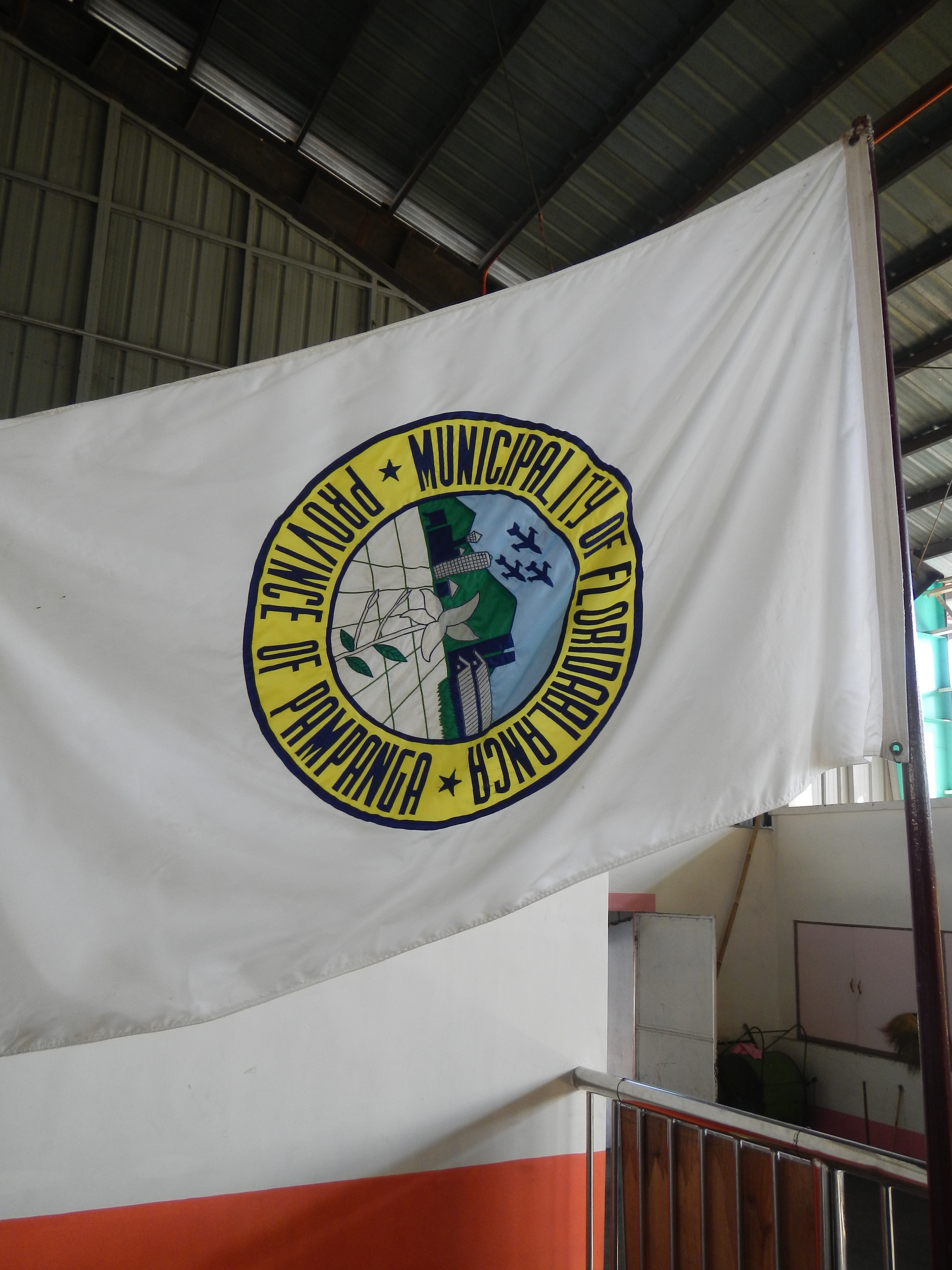
- Flag Seal

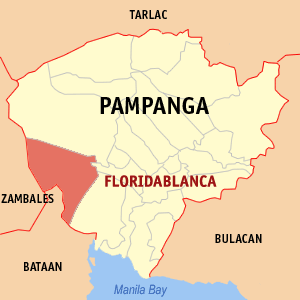
- Map of Pampanga with Floridablanca highlighted
- Interactive map of Floridablanca
- Location within the Philippines
- Coordinates: 14°58′26″N 120°31′41″E
- Country: Philippines
- Region: Central Luzon
- Province: Pampanga
- District: 2nd district
- Founded: April 30, 1867
- Barangays: 33 (see Barangays)

Government
  - Type: Sangguniang Bayan
  - Mayor: Michael L. Galang
  - Vice Mayor: Allan A. Policarpio
  - Representative: Gloria Macapagal Arroyo
  - Municipal Council: Members: Jessie Rex A. Laxamana; Edward S. Paras; Diosdado D. Vitug Jr.; Adonis G. Magat; Arnold M. Dimla; Fernando C. Garcia; Jacob E. Fajardo; Jocelyn M. Ong
  - Electorate: 77,262 voters (2025)

Area
  - Total: 175.48 km^{2} (67.75 sq mi)
- Elevation: 28 m (92 ft)
- Highest elevation: 114 m (374 ft)
- Lowest elevation: 7 m (23 ft)

Population (2024 census)
  - Total: 146,095
  - Density: 832.55/km^{2} (2,156.3/sq mi)
  - Households: 30,994

Economy
  - Income class: 1st municipal income class
  - Poverty incidence: 7.14% (2023)
  - Revenue: ₱ 501.7 million (2024)
  - Assets: ₱ 1,035 million (2024)
  - Expenditure: ₱ 47.05 million (2024)
  - Liabilities: ₱ 446.5 million (2024)

Service provider
  - Electricity: San Fernando Electric Light and Power Company (SFELAPCO)
- Time zone: UTC+8 (PST)
- ZIP code: 2006, 2007 (Basa Airbase)
- PSGC: 0305406000
- IDD : area code: +63 (0)45
- Native languages: Kapampangan; Tagalog

Floridablanca, officially the Municipality of Floridablanca (Kapampangan: Balen ning Floridablanca; Filipino: Bayan ng Floridablanca) is a municipality in the province of Pampanga, Philippines. According to the 2024 census, it has a population of 146,095 people.

== Etymology ==
The town was initially named San José de Calampaui, in honor of its patron, Saint Joseph. Floridablanca itself is derived from Spanish and translates to "white flower", with two versions of the name's origin.

One version suggest that the town was named in honor of José María de Castillejo y Moñino, 3rd Count of Floridablanca (25 February 1826 – 1892), who inherited the title of Condado de Floridablanca from the 2nd holder, his aunt María Vicenta Moñino y Pontejos, through his mother, María Ana. María Vicenta died in 1867 and thus José inherited the title; 1867 was also the year the town was renamed "Floridablanca". The rest of María Vicenta's titles devolved to her husband's family, the Marquesado de Miraflores, whose present holder married the granddaughter of President Elpidio Quirino. The Moñino family is popularly remembered as reformists against abuses by the Church: the clan patriarch, the first count also named José Moñino, secured from Pope Clement XIII the Suppression of the Society of Jesus in the reign of King Charles III of Spain, in 1767, exactly a hundred years before the foundation of the town. The expulsion of the friars in 1867 from the Calampaui monastery and renaming of the estate to Floridablanca thus made sense.

Another version of more credible origin suggests that the town was named after the white flowers of a pandacaqui plant (Tabernaemontana pandacaqui) that flourished in the area. Florida means "flower" and blanca means "white".

== History ==
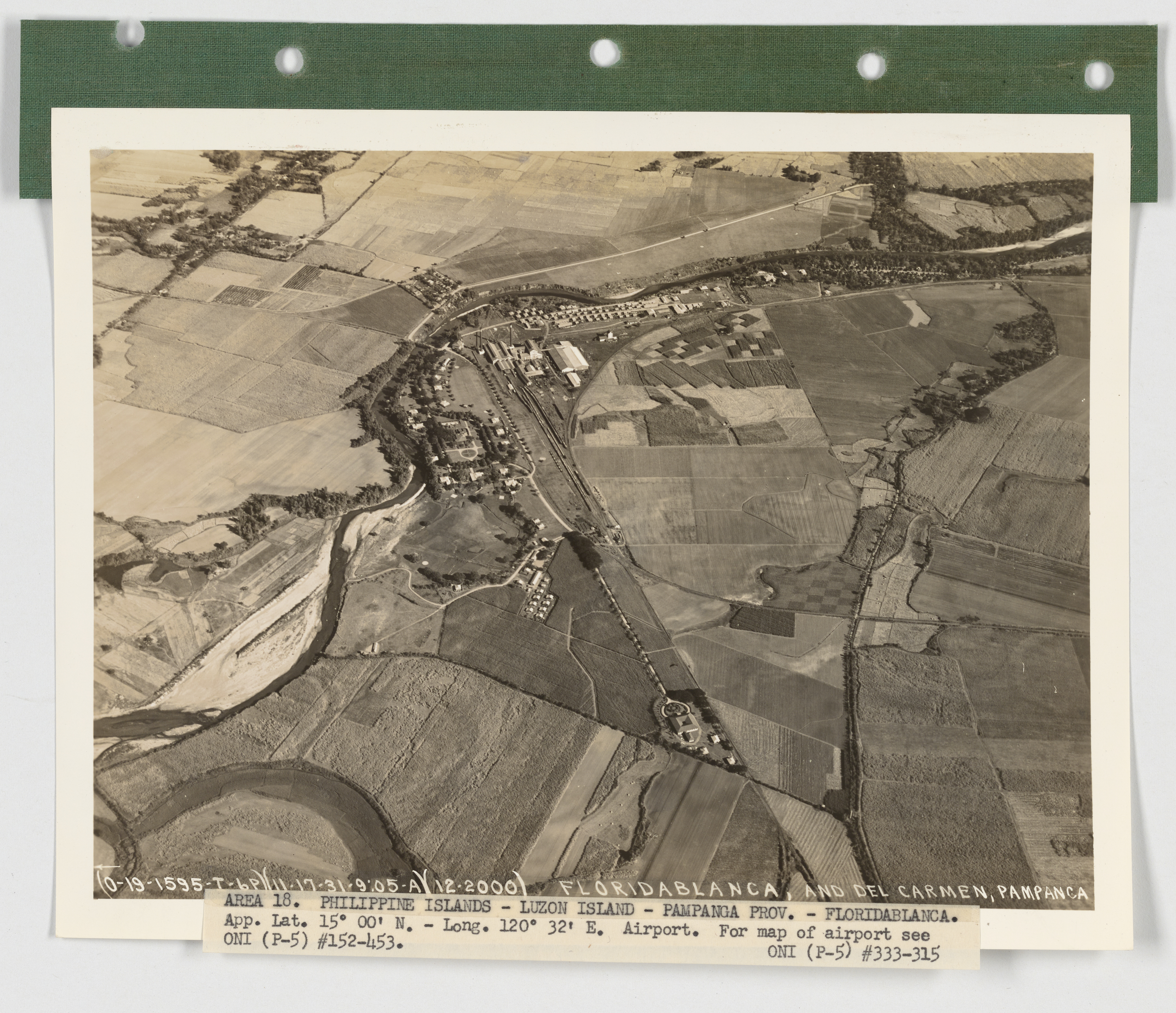
Aerial view of Floridablanca and Del Carmen, November 17, 1931

Floridablanca was founded in 1823 as Hacienda de San Jose de Caumpaui at the site of a monastery. In 1867, it was renamed to Pueblo de Floridablanca.

In the 1920s, the Pampanga Sugar Mill was built at Del Carmen in the 1920s. The area was the site of military bases of the Philippine Commonwealth Army and the Philippine Constabulary from 1942 to 1946. The Philippine Air Force established Basa Air Base at a former American military airfield in 1947.

In 1991, the Santo Nino enshrined in San Jose Obrero parish was stolen. Within two months or so, Mount Pinatubo erupted. Sand and ash and lahar fell into Floridablanca, killing hundreds and destroyed the rice paddies. Superstitions by the elders of the town exist that the theft of the statue resulted in such unimaginable disaster.

In 2024, the Santo Nino was rediscovered after almost 22 years. The Foronda family assisted in raising funds for its eventual return to San Jose Obrero parish.

== Geography ==
Floridablanca is located on the western part of Pampanga along the Zambales Mountains and is bounded by the municipalities of Porac on the north, Lubao on the south, Guagua on the east, and Dinalupihan on the west. It is 40 kilometres (25 mi) from the city of San Fernando, 106 kilometres (66 mi) from Manila, 41 kilometres (25 mi) from Balanga, and 15 kilometres (9.3 mi) from Porac.

The town is at an elevation of 12 feet (3.7 m) above sea level. Floridablanca is north of Dinalupihan via Dinalupihan-Floridablanca Access Road at the Bataan-Pampanga boundary line.

With an area of 17,548 hectares (43,360 acres), it is the third largest municipality in the province, after Porac and Candaba.

=== Barangays ===
Floridablanca is politically subdivided into 33 barangays, as shown below. Each barangay consists of puroks and some have sitios.

LIST OF BARANGAYS
Barangay	Punong Barangay	Portrait
ANON	ERNESTO NAGUIAT	
APALIT	RUBY GEGANTE	
BASA AIR BASE	ARABELLA TANGENTE	
BENEDICTO	OSCAR GOMEZ, JR.	
BODEGA	ANTONIO BAU	
CABANGCALAN	MARIA THERESA ARCABOS	
CALANTAS	RANDY GUEVARRA	
CARMENCITA	EMIL DIMLA	
CONSUELO	JOSE GERRY MARAMOT	
DAMPE	ROY GARCIA	
DEL CARMEN	JOEL SANTOS	
FORTUNA	RANDY PAGUIO	
GUTAD	MICHAEL REYES	
MABICAL	FEDERICO PATAWARAN	
MALIGAYA	LORIANO MIRANDA	
MAWACAT	MARILOU BACANI	
NABUCLOD	ROMEO ALVARO	
PABANLAG	RENATO BAST	
PAGUIRUAN	RAQUIEL GARCIA	
PALMAYO	MARCO JAKE FAJARDO	
PANDAGUIRIG	JESUS SANTOS	
POBLACION	WARNER BAIS	
SAN ANTONIO	WILLIAM MARIANO	
SAN ISIDRO	RAFAEL BAUL	
SAN JOSE	FLORDELIZA G. GOZUN	
SAN NICOLAS	ANA MARIE GALANG	
SAN PEDRO	RODOLFO MORALES	
SAN RAMON	RONIE CAPULONG	
SAN ROQUE	NARDO NAGUIAT	
SANTA MONICA	WILFREDO BUNDALIAN	
SANTO ROSARIO	JUAN MAQUESIAS	
SOLIB	ARIEL MASA	
VALDEZ	ANTONIO CASUPANAN	

=== Climate ===
Climate data for Floridablanca, Pampanga
Month	Jan	Feb	Mar	Apr	May	Jun	Jul	Aug	Sep	Oct	Nov	Dec	Year
Mean daily maximum °C (°F)	30 (86)	31 (88)	33 (91)	34 (93)	33 (91)	31 (88)	29 (84)	29 (84)	29 (84)	30 (86)	31 (88)	30 (86)	31 (87)
Mean daily minimum °C (°F)	19 (66)	19 (66)	20 (68)	23 (73)	25 (77)	25 (77)	24 (75)	24 (75)	24 (75)	23 (73)	21 (70)	20 (68)	22 (72)
Average precipitation mm (inches)	8 (0.3)	9 (0.4)	15 (0.6)	34 (1.3)	138 (5.4)	203 (8.0)	242 (9.5)	233 (9.2)	201 (7.9)	126 (5.0)	50 (2.0)	21 (0.8)	1,280 (50.4)
Average rainy days	3.7	4.1	6.5	11.2	21.2	24.9	27.7	26.5	25.5	21.8	12.6	5.6	191.3
Source: Meteoblue

== Demographics ==
Population census of Floridablanca

Year	Pop.	±% p.a.
1903	7,001	—
1918	9,486	+2.05%
1939	17,521	+2.96%
1948	24,825	+3.95%
1960	28,655	+1.20%
1970	39,830	+3.34%
1975	45,419	+2.67%
1980	51,648	+2.60%

Year	Pop.	±% p.a.
1990	66,146	+2.51%
1995	76,683	+2.81%
2000	85,394	+2.33%
2007	103,388	+2.67%
2010	110,846	+2.57%
2015	125,163	+2.34%
2020	135,542	+1.69%
2024	146,095	+1.82%

Source: Philippine Statistics Authority

In the 2024 census, the population of Floridablanca was 146,095 people, with a density of 830 inhabitants per square kilometer or 2,100 inhabitants per square mile.

== Economy ==
Poverty incidence of Floridablanca (%)

Source: Philippine Statistics Authority

Floridablanca is the second largest producer of rice in the province. It produces more than enough rice to meet its needs resulting in a surplus. In 1999, only 37.76% of its produce was used for its own rice requirement resulting in a surplus of 65.24% equivalent to 17,553 metric tons.

=== Banking and finance ===
The Bank of Florida, formerly Rural Bank of Floridablanca, Inc. was first established on February 10, 1964, with its first branch in Floridablanca, as one of the six subsidiaries of House of David Group headed by Ladislao Sibal-David, founder and chair. Its executive office, the BOF Corporate Center is located along Jose Abad Santos Avenue, San Jose, City of San Fernando, Pampanga.

== Government ==
=== Local government ===
Like other towns in the Philippines, Floridablanca is governed by a mayor and vice mayor who are elected to three-year terms. The mayor is the executive head and leads the town's departments in executing the ordinances and improving public services. The vice mayor heads a legislative council (Sangguniang Bayan) consisting of councilors from the Barangays of Barrios.

=== List of Municipal Leaders ===
Capitan Municipal

- 1897 – Don Gerónimo Romero Dinio
- 1898 – Don Cecilio Alvendia
- 1899 – Don Alejandro Ramos

Municipal Presidents

- 1900–1902 – Don Gerónimo Romero Dinio
- 1903–1905 – Don Alejandro Ramos
- 1906–1908 – Don Gregorio Panlaqui
- 1909–1911 – Don León Gutiérrez
- 1911 – Don Arcadio Ramírez
- 1912–1917 – Don Martin Sundiam
- 1918–1922 – Don José O. Dinio
- 1923–1925 – Don Isidoro Alvendia
- 1926–1931 – Don Roberto Nuguid
- 1932–1937 – Don Camilo Ocampo

MUNICIPAL MAYOR
No.	Image	Municipal Mayor	Term started	Term ended	Vice-Mayor
1		Geronimo Dinio Coronel	1938	1941	
2		Benigno Layug	1941 (Note: Entered office in January 1941 but term was disrupted due to Japanese occupation)	1941	
3		Francisco Vargas	1942	1943	
4		Fidel Pekson	1943	1944	
5		Leandro Garcia	1944	1944	
6		Benigno Layug	1945	1945	
7		Dr. Vicente Chincuanco	1945	1945	
8		Mariano Macabulos	1945	1946	
9		Arsenio Isip	1946	1947	Dominador Songco
(8)		Mariano Macabulos	1948	1951	Dominador Songco 1948-1949
(8)		Mariano Macabulos	1948	1951	TBD 1950-1951
10		Dominador Diyco Songco	1952	1955	
11		Atty. Marcelo Mendiola	1956	1959	
(10)		Dominador Diyco Songco	1960	1967	
11		Jose Dungca Mendiola	1968	1971	
12		Pedro Manuel Capulong	1972	1986	Rodante Pascual (1980–1986)
13		Tito Morales Mendiola	1986	June 30, 1992	
(12)		Pedro Manuel Capulong	June 30, 1992	June 30, 2001	Raul Capulong (1992-1998)
(12)		Pedro Manuel Capulong	June 30, 1992	June 30, 2001	Joe Rey Montemayor (1998-2001)
14		Joe Rey P. Montemayor	June 30, 2001	June 30, 2004	Raul Capulong
15		Darwin Ronquillo Manalansan	June 30, 2004	June 30, 2007	Romeo Lingad Jr.
16		Eduardo Dizon Guerrero	June 30, 2007	June 30, 2016	Joe Rey Montemayor
(15)		Darwin Ronquillo Manalansan	June 30, 2016	June 30, 2025	Engr. Michael Galang
17		Engr. Michael Lugtu Galang	June 30, 2025	Incumbent	Dr. Allan Policarpio

== Tourism ==
Aside from Basa Air Base, the town has cultural treasures and interesting points.

- 1887 San Jose Obrero Parish Church: the Roman Catholic Archdiocese of San Fernando exercises jurisdiction over the Heritage Church.
- Bahay na Puti (Alvendia House): the Justice Carmelino Alvendia, Sr. ancestral mansion is owned, preserved and maintained by his family.
- Bale Kastila (Paguiruan): a heritage mansion from 1800's.
- The Lafangfangan Gastro-Cultural Experience : Curated by Atching Katrina Monseratt "Monet" Siat-Roque—a respected local culinary figure and former town councilor—the activity shifts away from standard commercial buffets to provide a deep dive into Pampanga's food heritage.

== Education ==
There are two schools district offices which govern all educational institutions within the municipality. They oversee the management and operations of all private and public, from primary to secondary schools. These are the Floridablanca East Schools District Office, and Floridablanca West Schools District Office.

=== Primary and elementary schools ===
- Anon Elementary School
- Apalit Elementary School
- Basa Air Base Central School
- Benedicto Elementary School
- Bodega Elementary School
- Cabangcalan Elementary School
- Calantas Elementary School
- Camachile Elementary School
- Caritas Elementary School
- Carmencita Elementary School
- Central Luzon Adventist Academy
- Consuelo Elementary School
- Dampe Elementary School
- Del Carmen Elementary School
- Divine Wisdom School of Palmayo Inc.
- Floridablanca Christian Academy
- Floridablanca Elementary School
- Floridablanca New Settlement Elementary School (Resettlement Area)
- Fortuna Elementary School
- Golden Sunrise Learning Center
- Gutad Elementary School
- Mabical Elementary School
- Marifer School of Divine Mercy
- Mawacat Elementary School
- Mindhearts Academy of the Philippines
- Pabanlag Elementary School
- Paguiruan Elementary School
- Palmayo Elementary School
- Pandaguirig Elementary School
- Pulong Dagal Elementary School
- San Isidro Elementary School
- San Jose Elementary School
- San Nicolas Elementary School
- San Pedro Elementary School
- San Ramon Elementary School
- San Roque Elementary School
- Sitio Culubasa Elementary School
- St. Augustine Academy of Pampanga
- Sta. Monica Elementary School
- Sto. Rosario Elementary School
- Valdez Elementary School
- Zion of the Holy One Academy

=== Secondary schools ===
- Basa Air Base High School
- Bodega High School
- Diosdado Macapagal Memorial High School
- Floridablanca National Agricultural School - Main Campus
- Floridablanca National Agricultural School - Annex Campus
- Gutad National High School
- Nabuclod Integrated School
- Paguiruan National High School
- San Jose High School
- Valdez High School

=== Higher educational institutions ===
- I S School of Technology and Skills Development
- Megabyte College Foundation Inc.
- Philippine State College of Aeronautics
- West Central College of Arts and Science

== Notable personalities ==
NOTABLE FLORIDABLANCANS
No.	Image	Name	Industry	Brief Description	Barangay
1		Major General Reynaldo "Narding" Vitug Reyes (Retired)	Military	First and only Floridablancan Air Force General	Maligaya
2		Ricardo Buensuceso (Jeric Raval)	Entertainment	Filipino film and television actor	
3		Luisito Meyer Jr. (Dante Rivero)	Entertainment	Filipino film and television actor and FAMAS Awardee	
4		Jhyllianne Wardë (Jillian Ward)	Entertainment	Actress and FAMAS Awardee	Maligaya
5		Justice Carmelino Alvendia, Sr.	Judiciary	Justice of Court of Appeals and Founder of Quezon City Academy	Poblacion

== Gallery ==
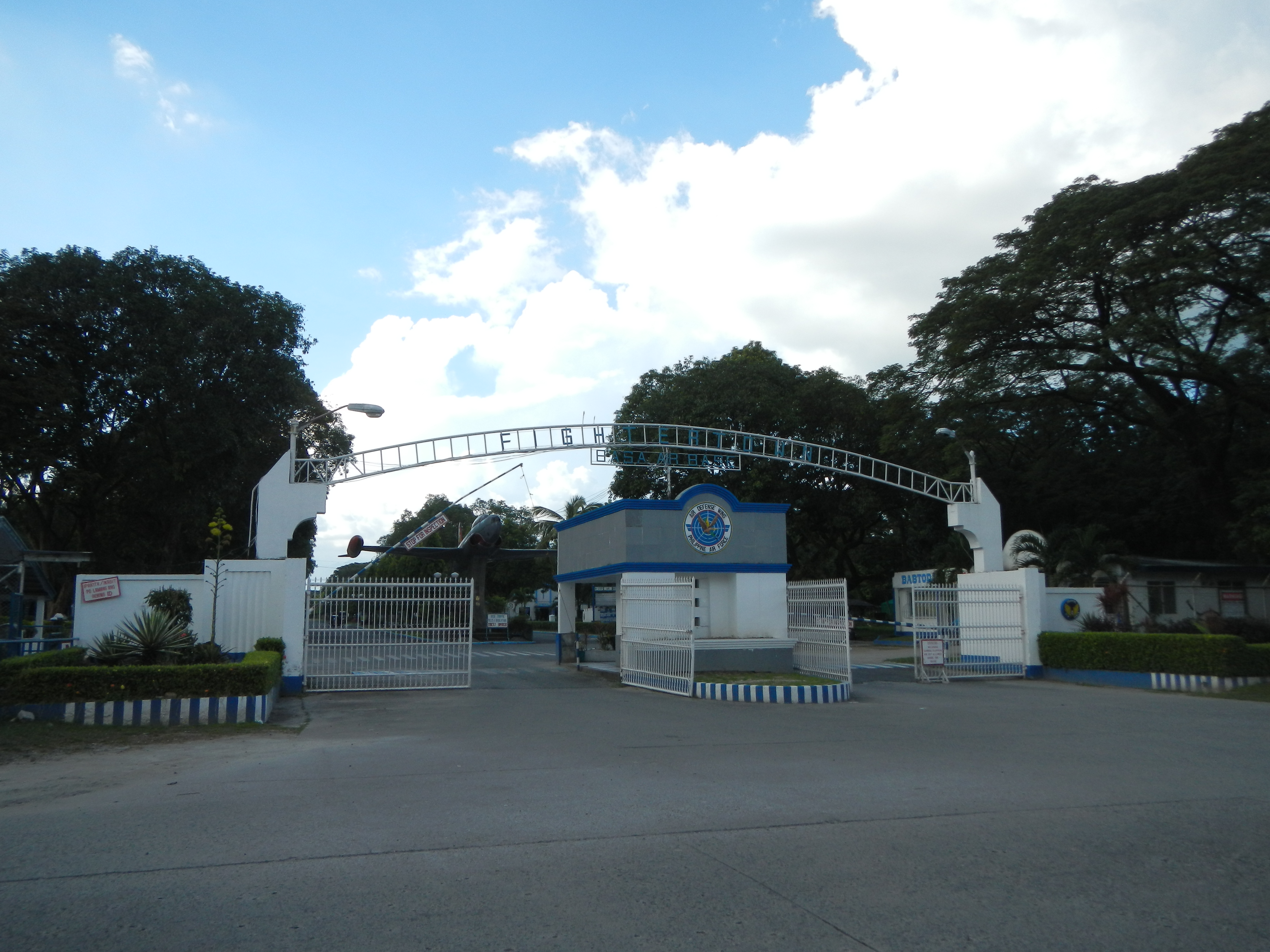
Basa Air Base Main Gate

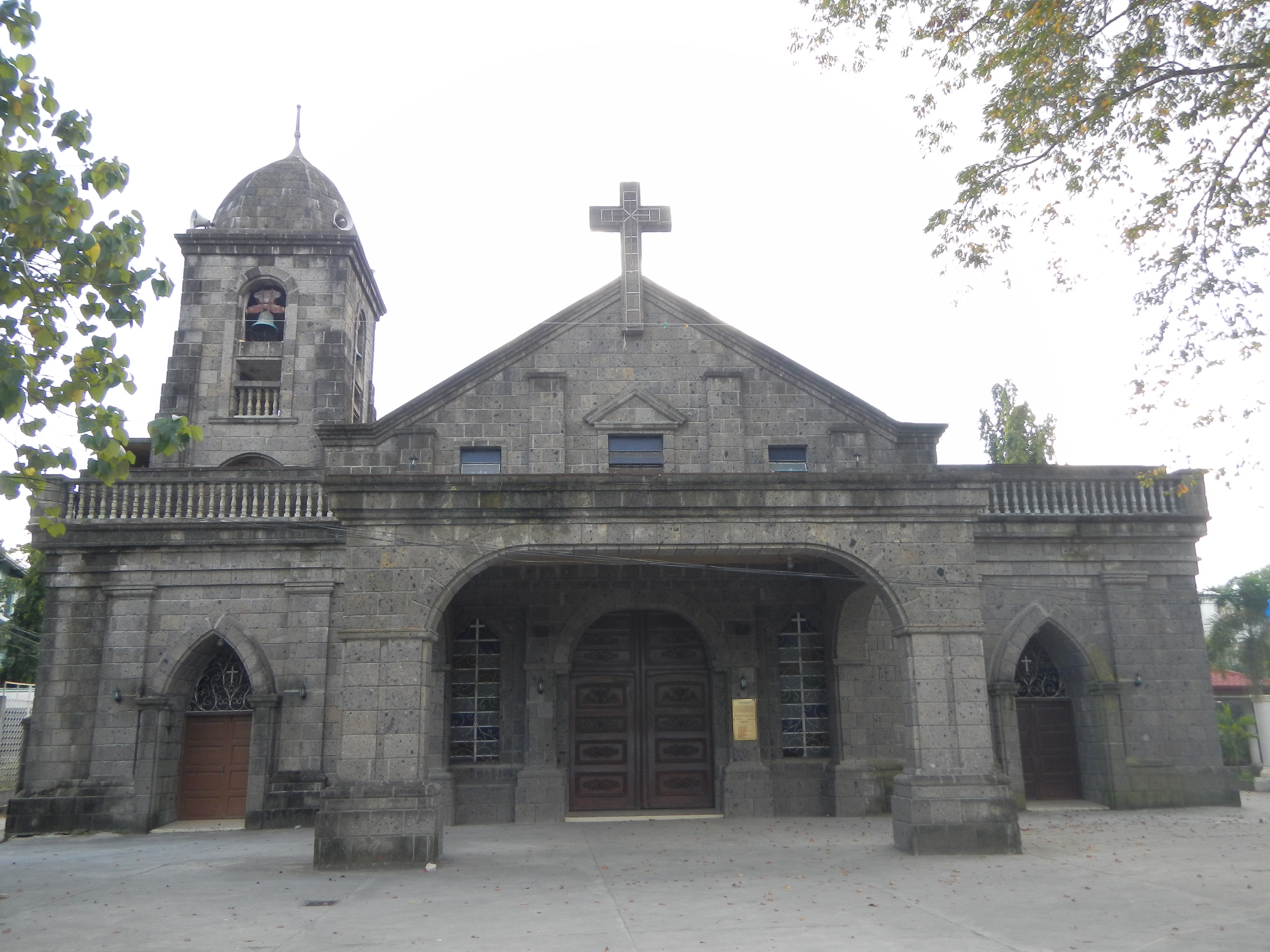
Façade of the Saint Joseph the Worker Parish Church

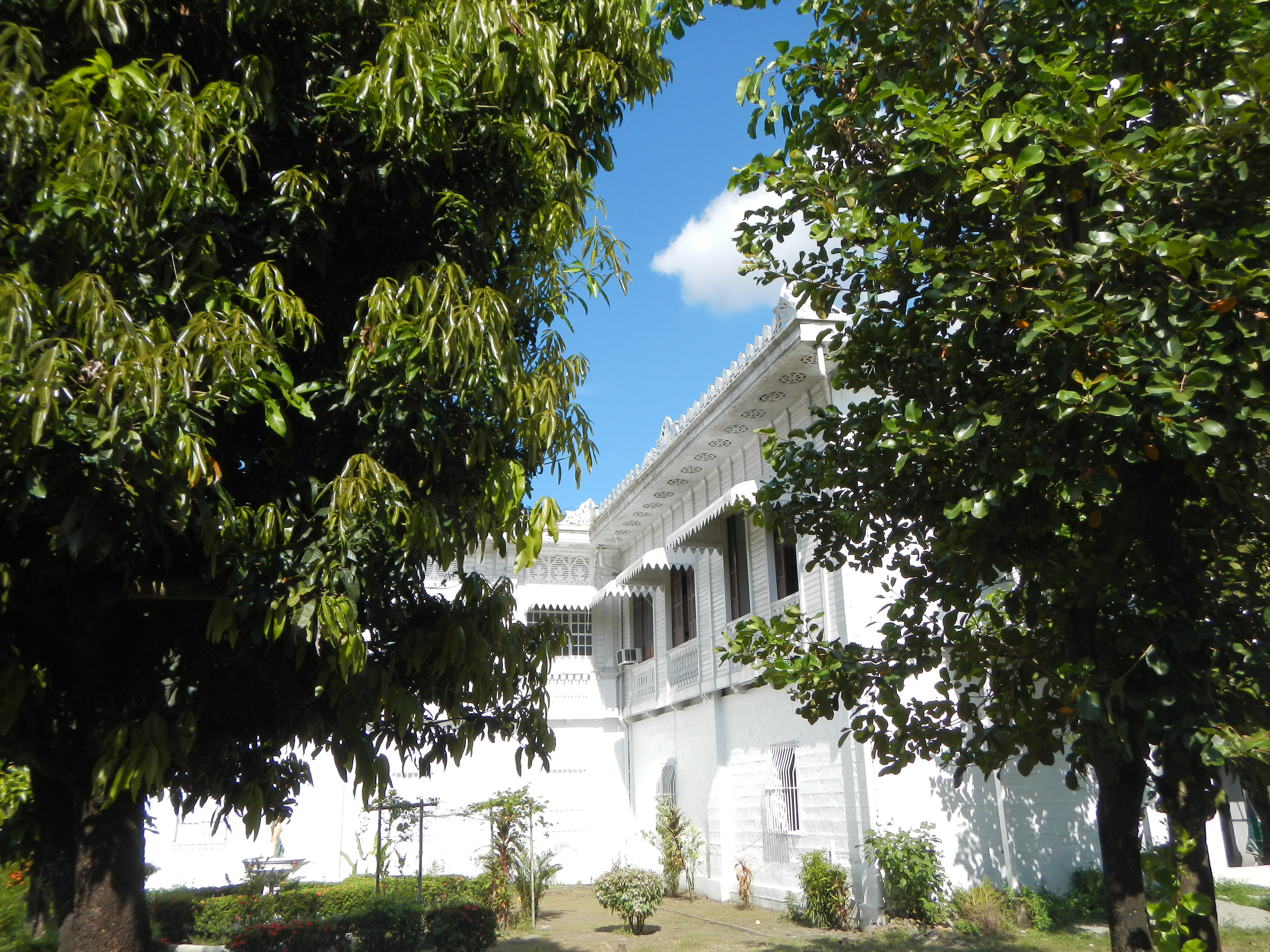
The heritage house of the town

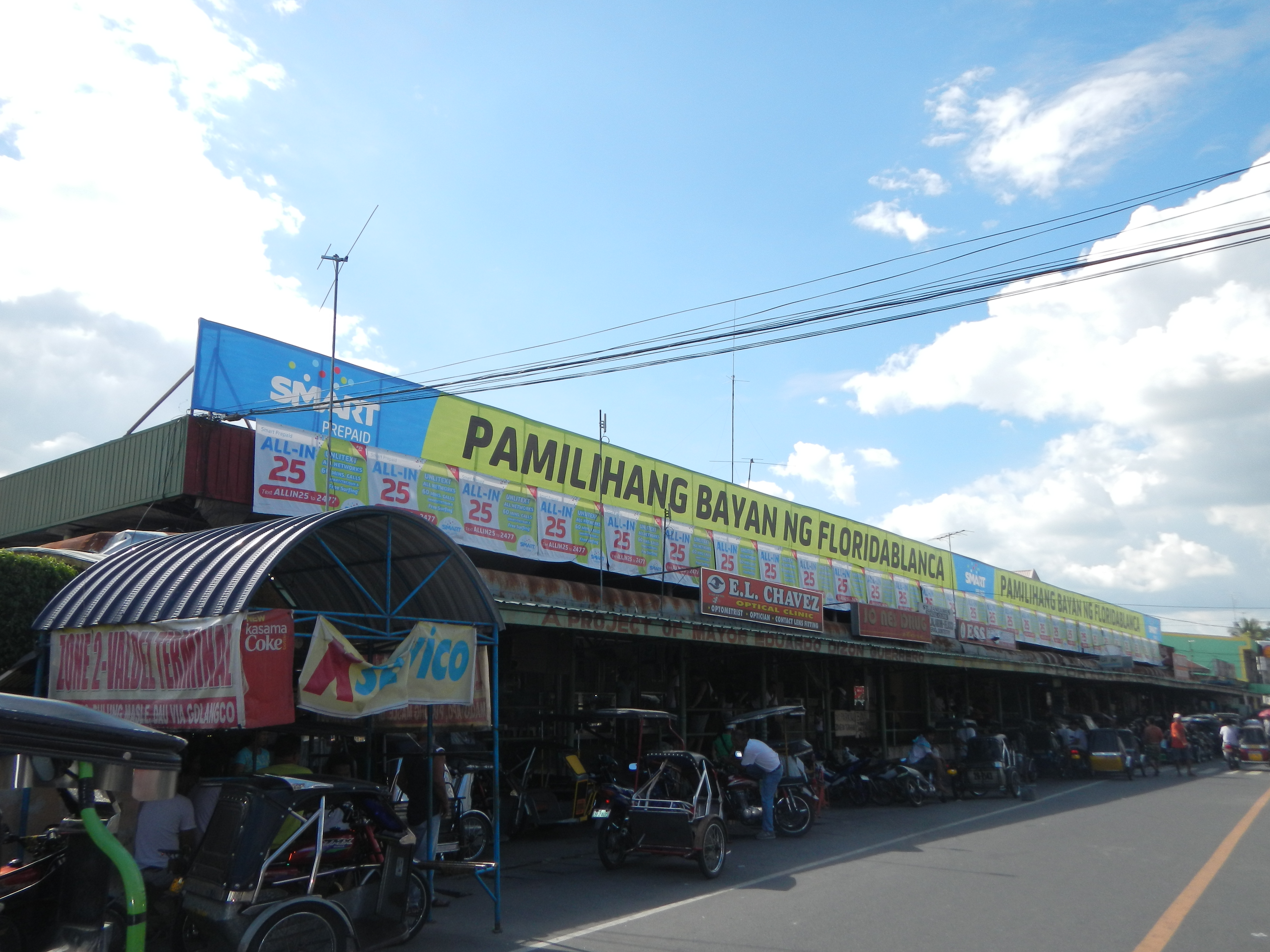
Public market
