= Saint Joseph the Worker Parish Church (Floridablanca) =

Roman Catholic church in Pampanga, Philippines

Floridablanca Church
- Saint Joseph the Worker Parish Church
- San Jose Obrero Parish Church
- Parokya nang San Jose Talapagobra (Kapampangan)
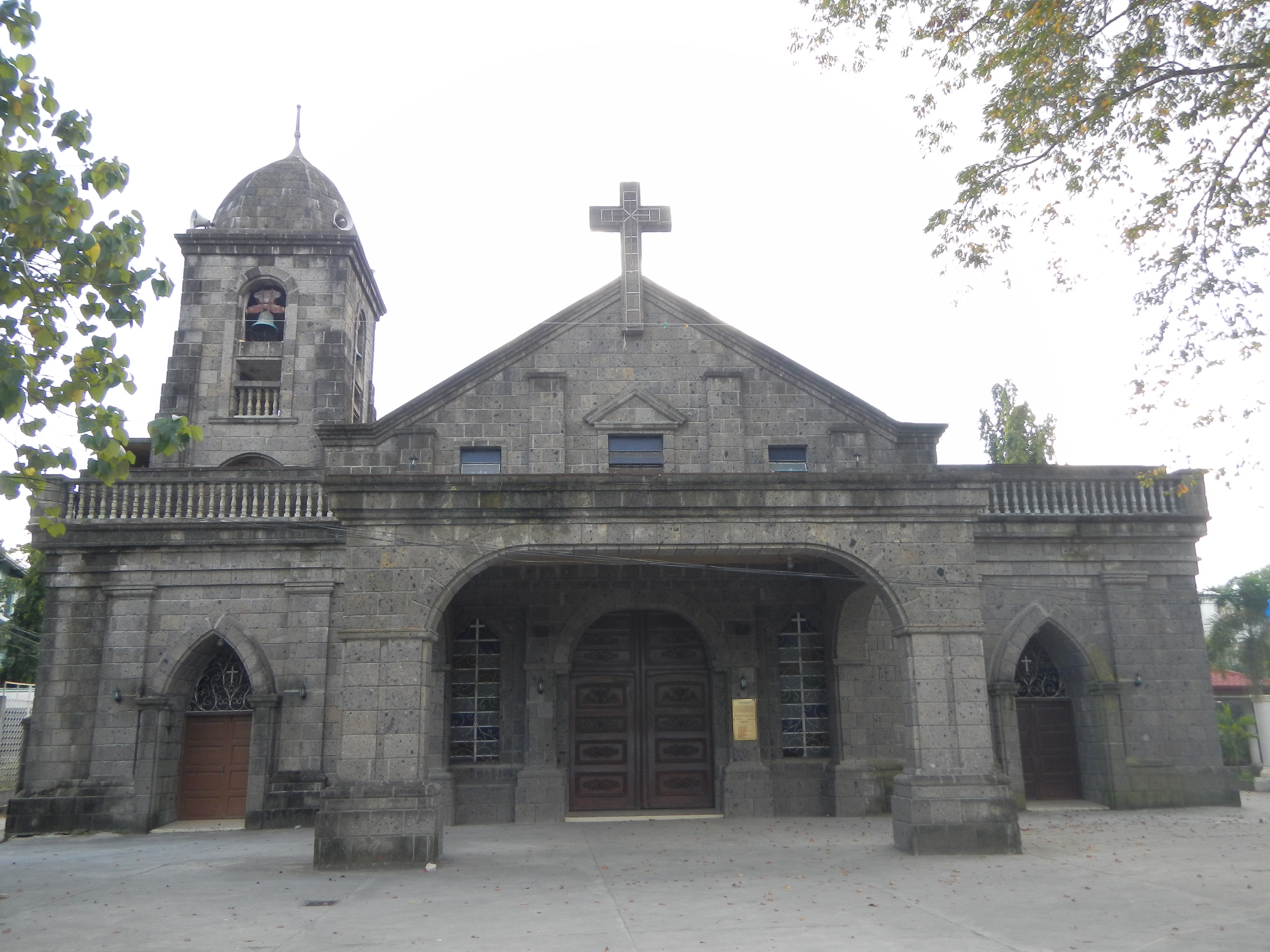
- Church facade in 2012

- Location in Luzon Location in the Philippines
- 14°58′25″N 120°31′37″E
- Location: Poblacion, Floridablanca, Pampanga
- Country: Philippines
- Denomination: Roman Catholic

Architecture
- Architect: Fr. Luciano Ylla
- Architectural type: Church building
- Style: Baroque, Neo-Gothic
- Completed: 1887

Specifications
- Materials: Sand, gravel, cement, mortar, steel and bricks

Administration
- Province: Ecclesiastical Province of San Fernando
- Archdiocese: San Fernando

Clergy
- Priest: Rev. Fr. Alvin Modesto S. Manalang

Saint Joseph the Worker Parish Church, commonly known as Floridablanca Church, is a 19th-century Neo-Gothic Roman Catholic church located at Barangay Poblacion, Floridablanca, Pampanga, Philippines. The parish church, under the aegis of Saint Nicholas of Tolentine, is currently under the Archdiocese of San Fernando.

== History ==
Available records tell that present-day Floridablanca started as the Hacienda de San Jose de Calumpaui and had its own chapel since 1823. By 1867, a petition was signed to move the town center to its current site. The petition was approved in November of the same year and the formal inauguration of the town followed in January 1879. In 1887, Father Luciano Morros Ylla built the church and convent. Several renovations were done into the church structure before and after the turn of the century: Father Rodriguez Prado rebuilt the convent of stone and wood in 1893; Father Elifio Aparicio reinforced the church with concrete in the early quarter of the 20th century. The church became a casualty of World War II, with only the walls withstanding the bombing of 1945. It was said that Father Francisco Mozo died as the bell tower collapsed above him during impact. The parish was renovated and enlarged in 1967.

== Architecture ==
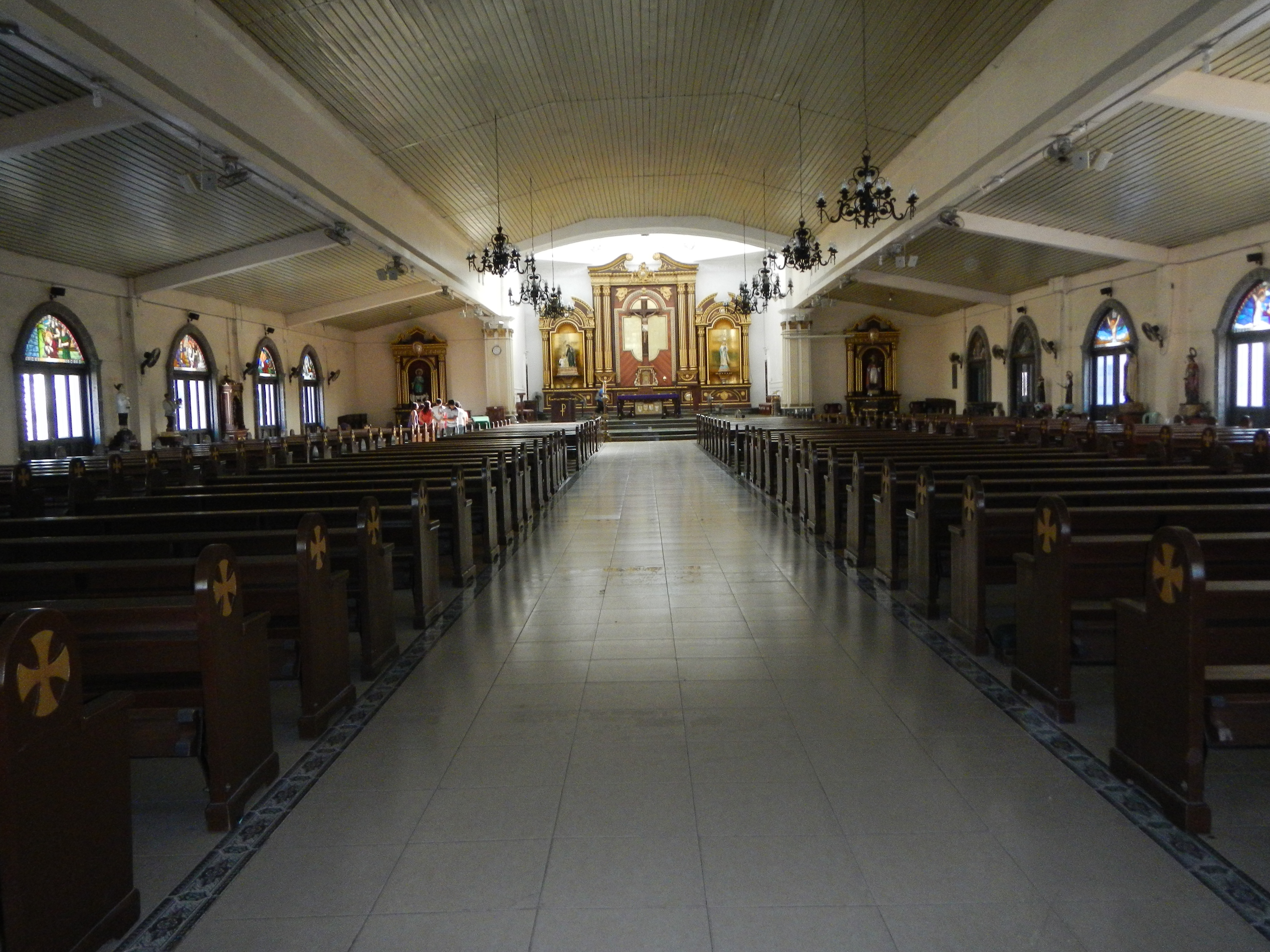
Church interior in 2015

The original structure measures 56 metres (184 ft) long, 20 metres (66 ft) wide and 10 metres (33 ft) high, with a main nave and two aisles. The style is of Pseudo-Gothic, with prominent pointed arch windows blending in with the other Neoclassical features of the facade. Besides the pointed finials on the second level of the facade and the cornices along the base and edge of the imaginary pediment, the facade is devoid of any other ornamentation. To the right of the church is the slender three-level, belfry.

== Gallery ==
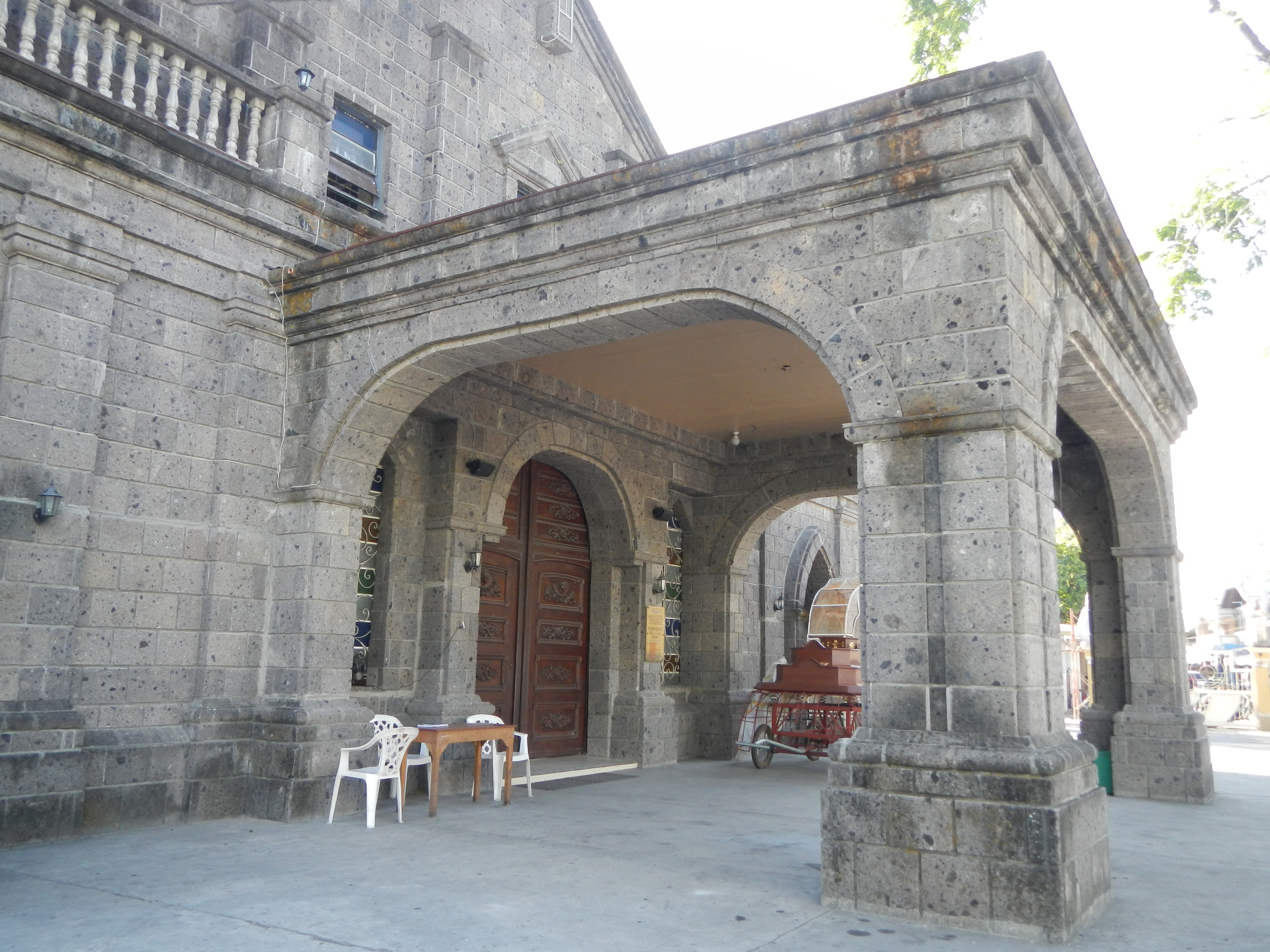
Porte-cochère

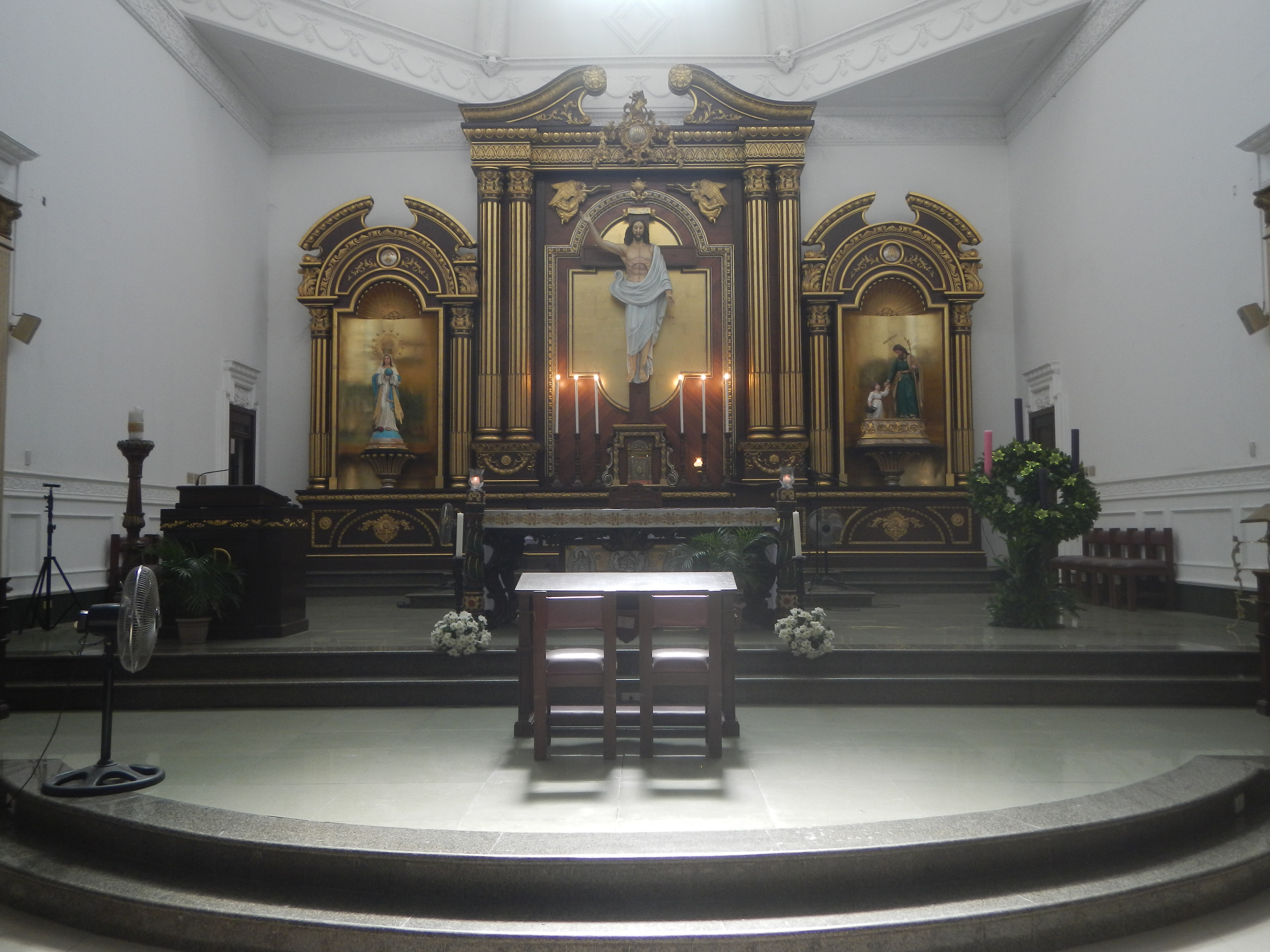
Church sanctuary

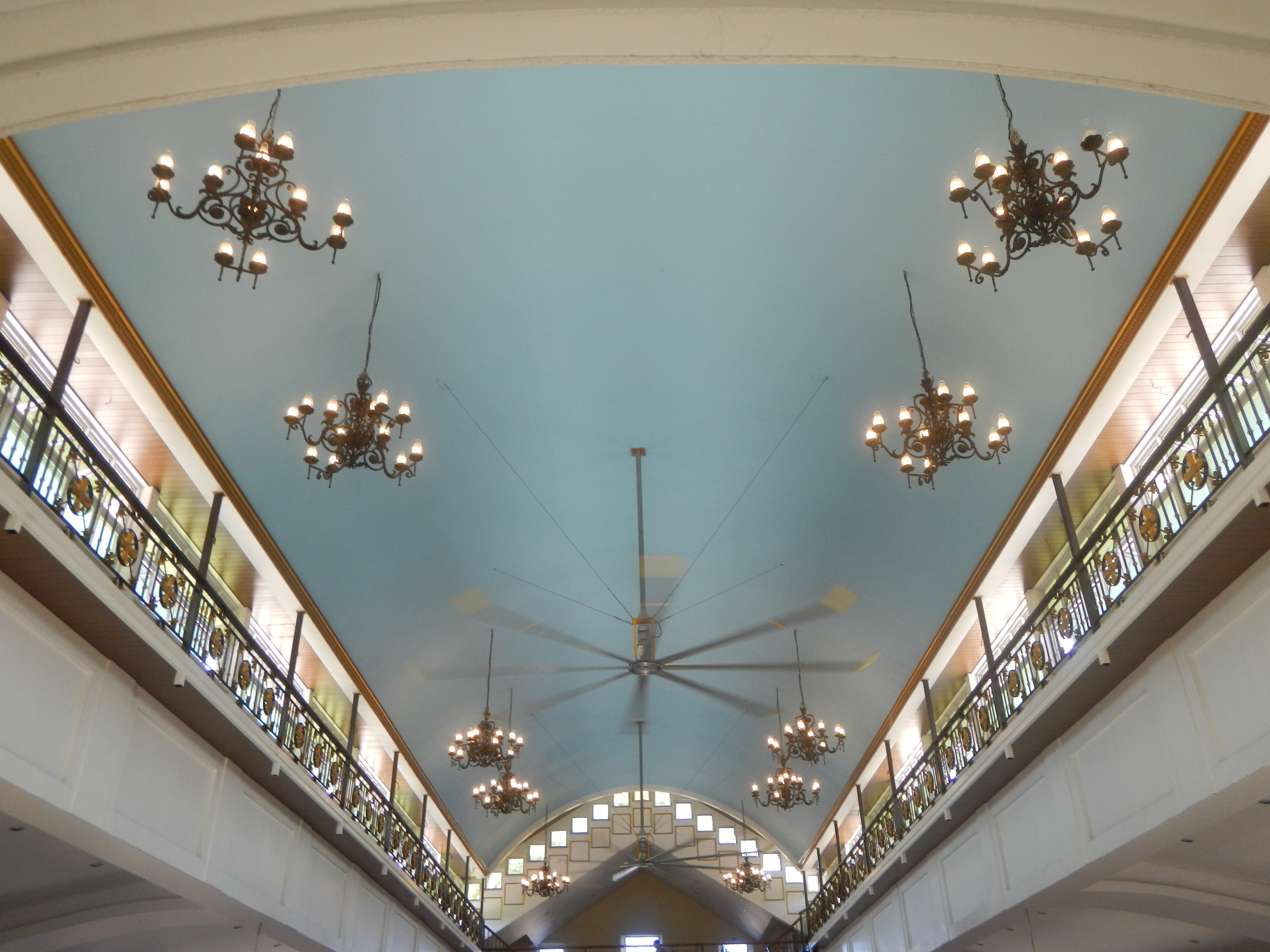
Church ceiling

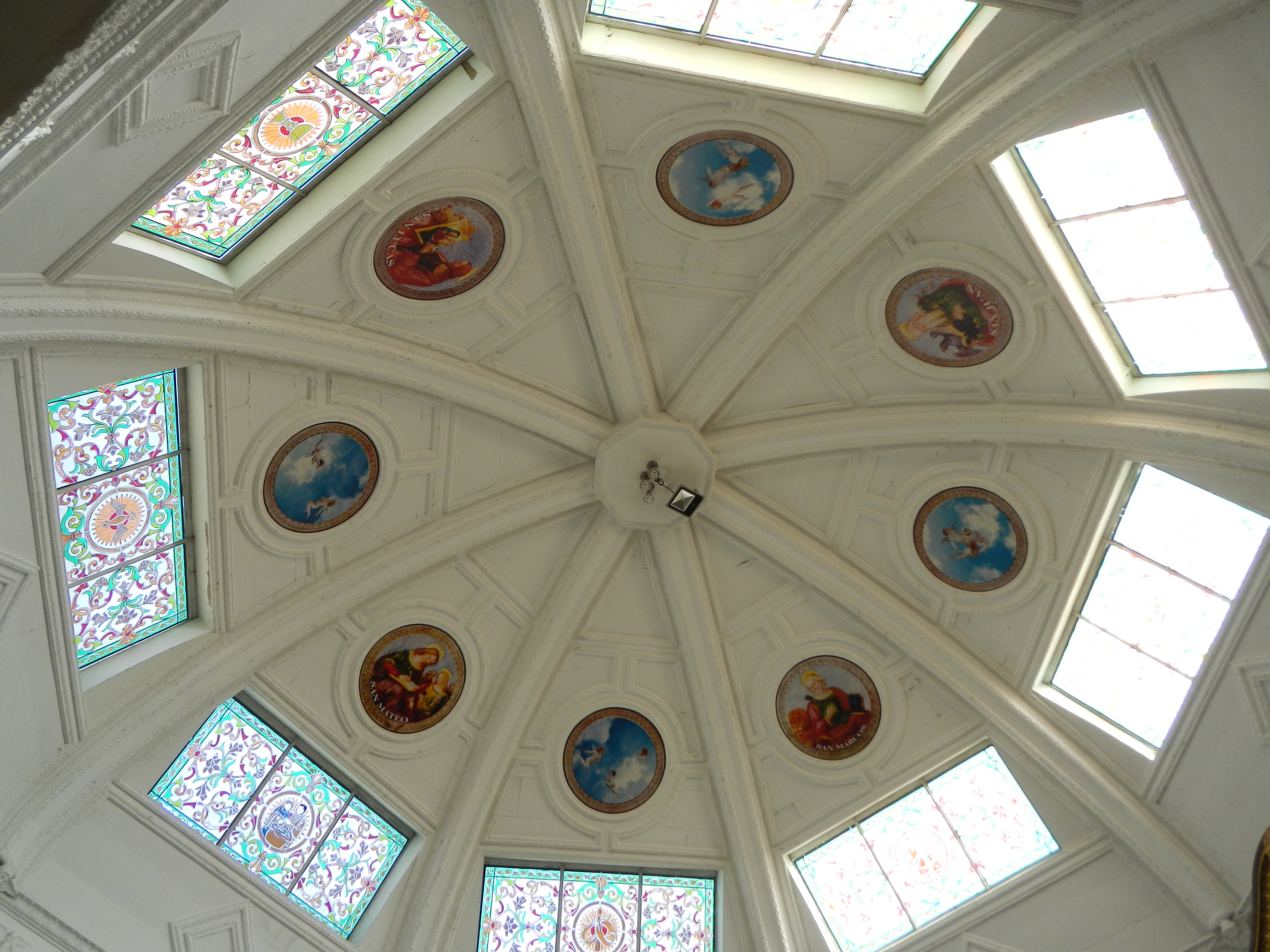
Dome interior and clerestories
