= Carmelino G. Alvendia =

Filipino judge (1906–1982)

Carmelino Gomez Alvendia
- Born: November 3, 1906; Floridablanca, Pampanga, Philippine Islands
- Died: March 6, 1982 (aged 75)

Carmelino Gomez Alvendia Sr. (November 3, 1906 – March 6, 1982) was a justice of Court of Appeals of the Philippines, a founder of Quezon City Academy and a co-founder of the Manuel L. Quezon University (MLQU), formerly Manuel L. Quezon Educational Institute, in 1947.

== Biography ==
Alvendia was born on November 3, 1906, at Floridablanca, Pampanga. He earned his Associate of Arts in the University of the Philippines in 1926. He received his Bachelor of Laws degree, cum laude, in 1930 and his Master of Laws degree in 1933 from the university. While in the university, he joined the Upsilon Sigma Phi in 1926.

In 1938, he earned his Doctor of Civil Law in the University of Santo Tomas. During the tenure of President Diosdado Macapagal of the Philippines, he was elevated as one of the justices of Court of Appeals.

In 1963, he bought Bago Bantay Academy located in the heart of Epifanio de los Santos Avenue (EDSA) and renamed it "Quezon City Academy" (QCA). QCA remains a secondary school in Metro Manila.

Alvendia died on March 6, 1982. During the centenary of his birth, QCA conducted a program and celebrations that were attended by thousands of alumni from 1953 to 2008.

== Heritage Bahay na Puti (Alvendia House) ==
The Floridablanca, Pampanga Justice Carmelino Alvendia Sr. ancestral mansion ("White House") is owned, preserved and maintained by his family.

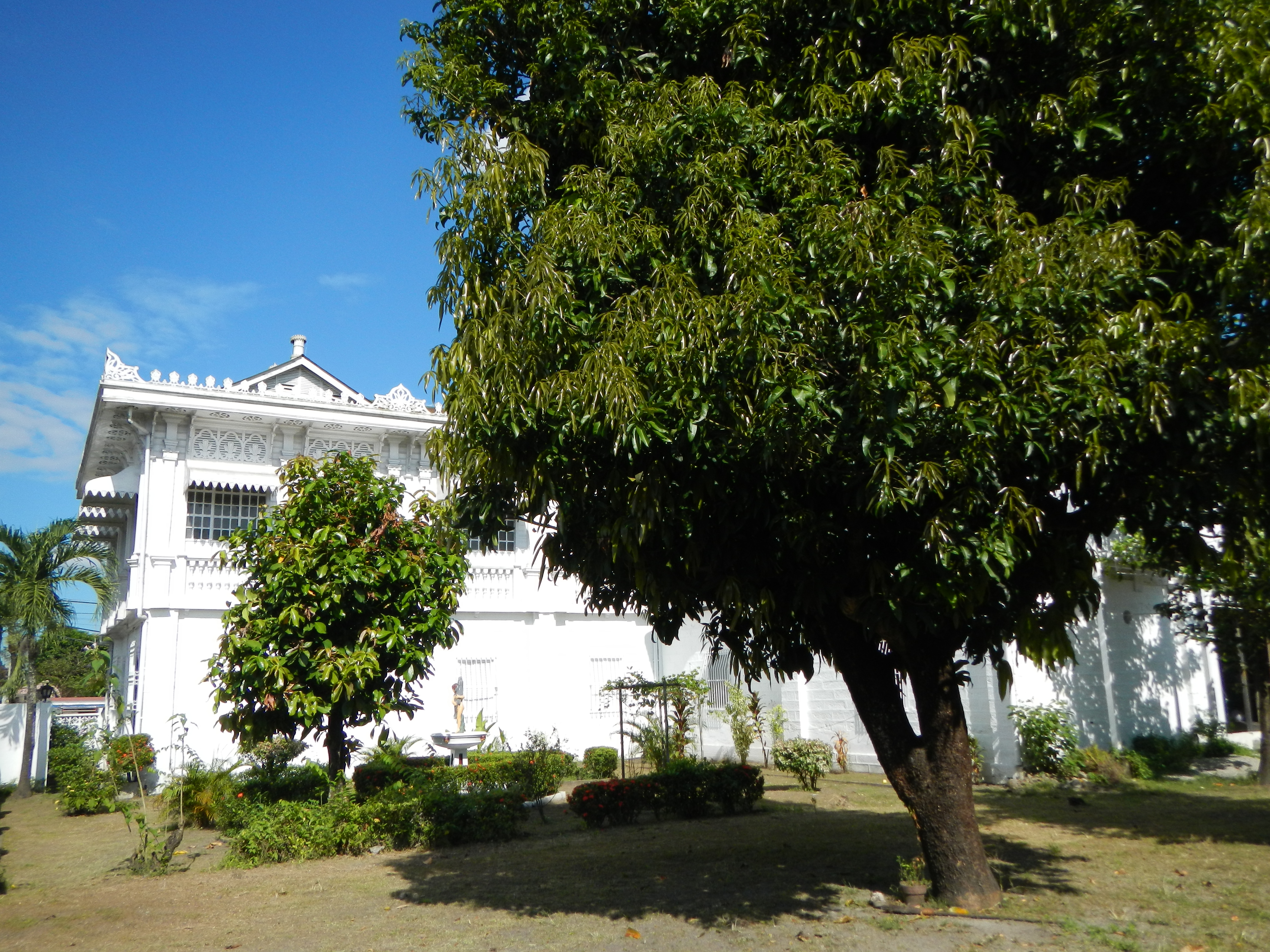
Rear view

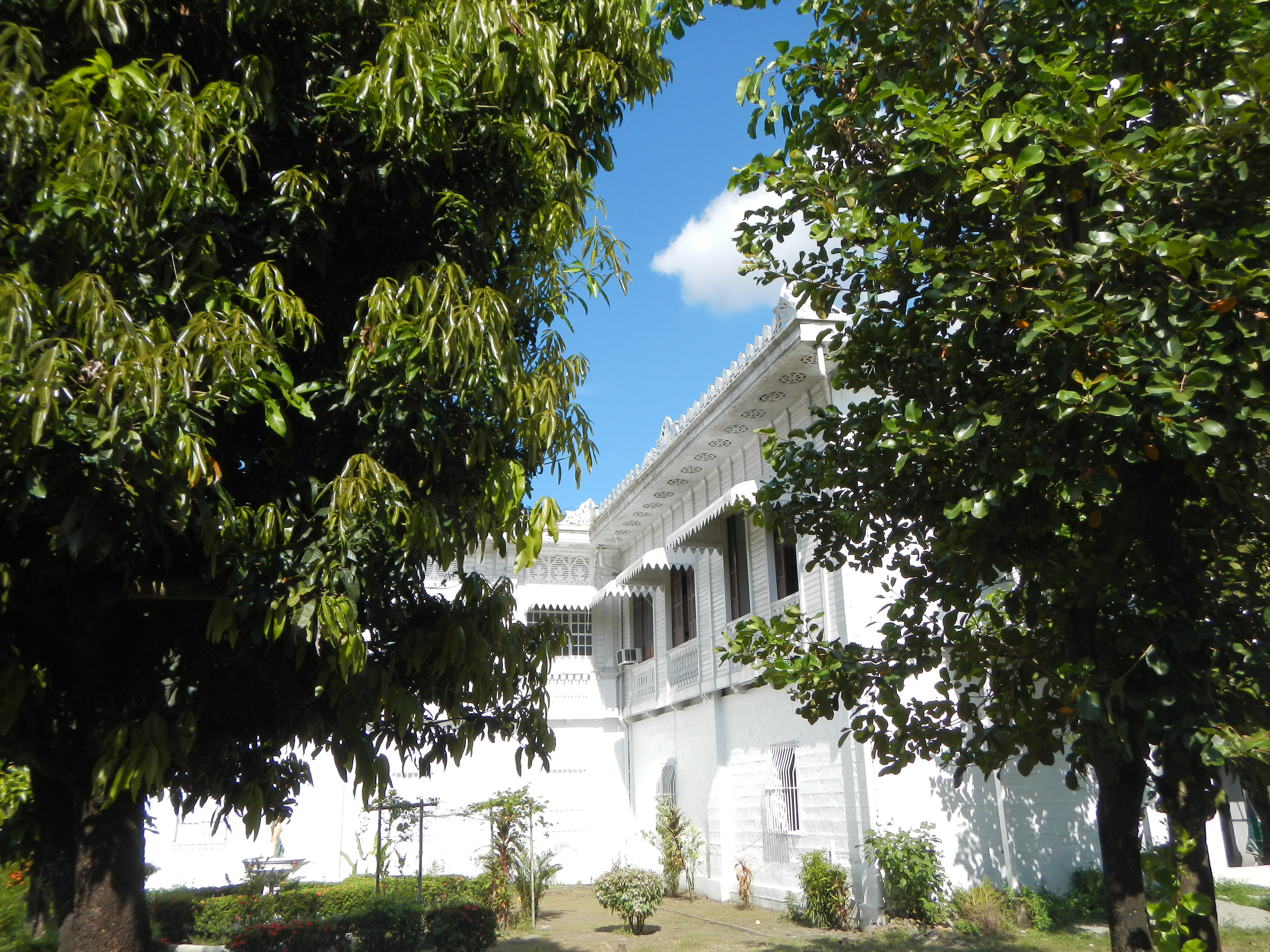
The heritage house of the town

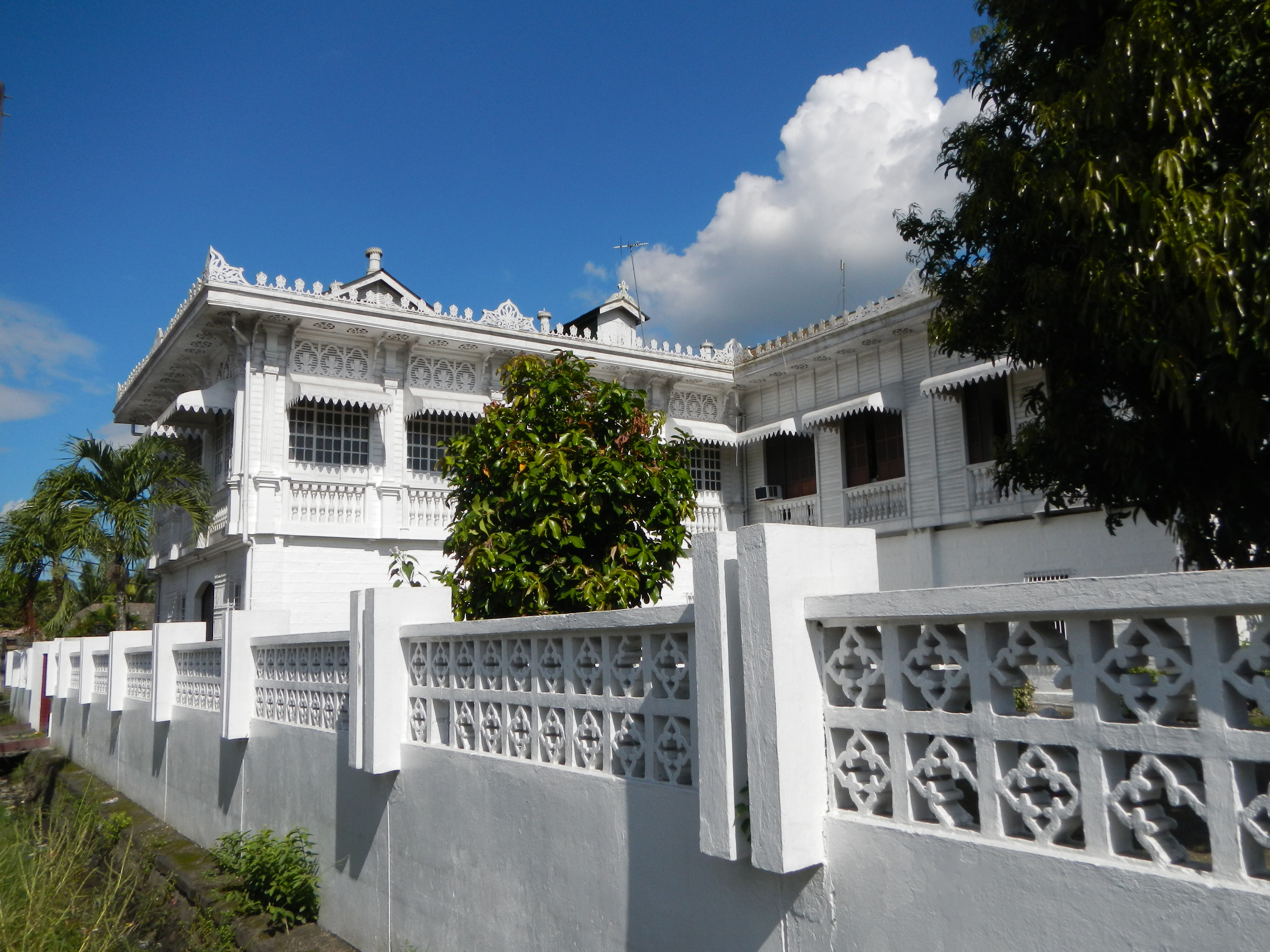
White fence

== See also ==
- Quezon City Academy
- Manuel L. Quezon University
- Philippine Court of Appeals
