= Barangay Maligaya =

Barangay in Floridablanca, Pampanga, Philippines

Maligaya
- Barangay in Floridablanca
- Seal
- Country: Philippines
- Region: Central Luzon
- Province: Pampanga
- District: 2nd District of Pampanga
- Municipality: Floridablanca
- Established: 1960

Government
  - Type: Barangay
  - Barangay Chairman: Loriano "Larry" Nelgas Miranda

Population (2024)
  - Total: 1,655
- Time zone: UTC+8 (Philippine Standard Time)
- Zip Code: 2006

Maligaya, officially Barangay Maligaya (Kapampangan: Barrio ning Maligaya); is a semi-urban community located in the municipality of Floridablanca, Pampanga. Formerly a sitio (a smaller territorial unit) of Barangay Fortuna, it gained official recognition as an independent barangay in 1960. Positioned just half a kilometer from the town center, Maligaya is easily reachable via public transportation such as tricycles and jeepneys.

== History ==
On October 5, 2018, then-House Speaker Gloria Macapagal Arroyo conducted an official site inspection of a newly initiated slope protection project along Santol Creek in Barangay Maligaya as part of her district-wide flood control master plan. Political presence in the area continued on December 7, 2024, when former Congressman Mikey Macapagal-Arroyo made a local visit to relatives and community leaders, accompanied by municipal officials including Vice Mayor Michael Galang, Councilor Jojo Vitug, PPSK Chairman Simbillo, and Barangay Captain Larry Miranda. Most recently, on January 28, 2025, returning Congresswoman Gloria Macapagal-Arroyo, alongside Vice-Mayor Michael Galang and Department of Public Works and Highways (DPWH) District Engineer Jigs Audea, executed a follow-up inspection of the completed 2018 slope protection infrastructure to evaluate its long-term structural integrity and overall effectiveness in safeguarding the local community against seasonal flooding.

CGMA visits Barangay Maligaya

== Geography and environment ==
Maligaya lies adjacent to Santol Creek and is classified as a low-lying area. Due to its geographical location, it often serves as a natural catch basin for irrigation water coming from neighboring Barangay Solib. This sometimes results in waterway congestion and drainage challenges.

== Infrastructure ==
Barangay Maligaya is equipped with essential infrastructure that supports both governance and community welfare. These include:

- A 2.595-kilometer access road, composed of 2.5 kilometers of concrete pavement, 20 meters of gravel, and a 7.5-meter stretch of earth surface.
- A multipurpose Barangay Hall, which also houses the Barangay Health Center.
- A basketball court for recreational and athletic activities.
- A day care center providing early childhood education.
- A barangay outpost that enhances local safety and security.
- A Catholic chapel dedicated to Our Lady of the Immaculate Conception, serving as a spiritual center for the community.

== Community and faith ==
The barangay is predominantly Roman Catholic, but it also includes members of Iglesia Ni Cristo, Born-again Christians, and other religious denominations. This diverse religious composition reflects the community’s culture of mutual respect and peaceful coexistence.

== Population ==
Barangay Maligaya's population has shown steady growth over the decades. From a total of 806 residents in 1990, it increased to 996 by 2020—an overall rise of 190 individuals. Based on the 2020 census, the barangay experienced a modest annual growth rate of 0.58% between 2015 and 2020, gaining 27 new residents during that period.

As of the 2024 census published by the Philippine Statistics Authority, the population of Barangay Maligaya rises to 1,655 from 996 in 2020 census. An increase of 659 people (a 66.1% jump from its 996 base in 2020) over four years is an exceptionally high localized growth rate due to migration.

== Government and Barangay officials ==
The current Barangay Council were elected on October 31, 2023. The seat of government of Maligaya is located at Purok 1.

Maligaya Barangay Hall

=== CURRENT BARANGAY OFFICIALS ===
2023–2028

Current Barangay Officials where elected last October 30, 2023 Barangay and SK Elections.

- Punong Barangay: LORIANO N. MIRANDA
- Kagawad: JOSELITO S. GUANZON
- Kagawad: ARNEL M. DAVID
- Kagawad: RYAN CHRISTIAN S. BANSIL
- Kagawad: BIENVENIDO N. MANLULU JR.
- Kagawad: RICHARDSON V. SANTOS
- Kagawad: GREGORIO G. GALVEZ
- Kagawad: EDNA C. MALLARI
- SK Chairman: KIER CARLO M. MANLULU

=== LIST OF PUNONG BARANGAY ===
Full Name	Term Began	Term Ended
LORIANO MIRANDA	2023	PRESENT
ANANIAS BUERGO JR.	2010	2023
WOLFRANDO SANTOS		2010
MANUEL BATAC		
BIENVENIDO MANLULU SR.		
IGNACIO BALUYUT		
BEN DUCUT		
CIANO LINGAD		
