= San Francisco High School =

High school in Ifugao, Philippines

Coordinates: 16°39′00″N 121°13′26″E

San Francisco High School is a high school in Lamut, Ifugao, Philippines.
